= Opera at the Edinburgh International Festival: history and repertoire, 1957–1966 =

Opera continued to be one of the main features of the Edinburgh International Festival in the second decade.

The tradition of inviting one or more guest companies each year to bring productions to the festival continued with La Scala (Piccola Scala), the Stuttgart State Opera, Royal Opera Stockholm, Glyndebourne Opera, Covent Garden Opera, Belgrade Opera, the English Opera Group, Teatro San Carlo, Naples, Budapest Opera and Ballet, National Theatre, Prague, the Holland Festival and the Bavarian State Opera.

Distinguished conductors included the large Italian contingent of Antonino Votto, Nino Sanzogno, Gianandrea Gavazzeni, Vittorio Gui, Carlo Maria Giulini, Alberto Erede and Oliviero De Fabritiis, the Hungarians Georg Solti and János Ferencsik, the British John Pritchard and Benjamin Britten, as well as the German Ferdinand Leitner, the Austrian Carlos Kleiber, and the Croatian Lovro von Matačić.

Major opera directors included Luchino Visconti, Giorgio Strehler, Franco Zeffirelli, Wieland Wagner, Günther Rennert and Carl Ebert.

Star female singers included Maria Callas, Joan Sutherland, Magda Olivero, Renata Scotto, Fiorenza Cossotto, Inge Borkh, Irmgard Seefried, Victoria de los Ángeles, Birgit Nilsson, Anja Silja, Kerstin Meyer, and Elisabeth Söderström, while male singers included Luigi Alva, Giuseppe Di Stefano, Nicolai Gedda, Alfredo Kraus, Fritz Wunderlich, Wolfgang Windgassen, Peter Pears, Fernando Corena, Sesto Bruscantini, Geraint Evans and Boris Christoff.

== 1957 (four productions) ==
Orchestra, Choir, Conductor	Director, Set Designer	Female singer	Male singer
La Scala (Piccola Scala) production of La sonnambula by Vincenzo Bellini, August 19, 21, 26, 29, and September 3, 1957 (five performances) at the Kings Theatre
Orchestra and Chorus of La Scala, Milan; Antonino Votto	Luchino Visconti; Piero Tosi settings	Maria Callas Amina; Renata Scotto Amina; Fiorenza Cossotto Teresa; Greta Rapisardi Lisa	Dino Mantovani Alessio; Franco Ricciardi Notary; Nicola Monti Elvino; Nicola Zaccaria Count Rodolfo
La Scala (Piccola Scala) production of Il matrimonio segreto by Domenico Cimarosa, August 20, 22, 24, 28 1957 (four performances) at the Kings Theatre
Orchestra and Chorus of La Scala, Milan; Nino Sanzogno	Giorgio Strehler; Luciano Damiani settings	Eugenia Ratti Elisseta; Graziella Sciutti Carolina; Gabriella Carturan Fidalma	Carlo Badioli Geronimo; Franco Calabrese Count Robinson; Luigi Alva Paolino
La Scala (Piccola Scala) production of L'elisir d'amore by Gaetano Donizetti, August 23, 27, 31 and September 5, 7 1957 (five performances) at the Kings Theatre
Orchestra and Chorus of La Scala, Milan; Nino Sanzogno	Franco Enriquez; Mario Velani Marchi settings	Rosanna Carteri Adina; Greta Rapisardi Giannetta	Giuseppe Di Stefano Nemorino; Giulio Fioravanti Belcore; Fernando Corena Dulcamara
La Scala (Piccola Scala) production of Il Turco in Italia by Gioachino Rossini, August 30 and September 2, 4, 6 September 1957 (four performances) at the Kings Theatre
Orchestra and Chorus of La Scala, Milan; Gianandrea Gavazzeni	Franco Zeffirelli; Franco Zeffirelli settings	Fiorenza Cossotto Zaida; Eugenia Ratti Donna Fiorilla	Angelo Mercuriali Albazar; Sesto Bruscantini Prosdocimo; Franco Calabrese Don Geronio; Fernando Corena Selim; Luigi Alva Don Narciso

== 1958 (five productions) ==
Orchestra, Choir, Conductor	Director, Set Designer	Female singer	Male singer
Stuttgart State Opera production of Die Entführung aus dem Serail by Wolfgang Amadeus Mozart, August 25, 27, 29, and September 4, 10, 12 1958 (six performances) at the Kings Theatre
Orchestra of the Stuttgart State Opera; Chorus of the Stuttgart State Opera; Ferdinand Leitner, Lovro von Matačić	Kurt Puhlmann; Leni Bauer-Ecsy settings	Wilma Lipp Constanze; Ruth-Margaret Putz Constanze; Erika Köth Constanze; Lotte Schädle Blonde	Josef Traxel Belmonte; Fritz Wunderlich Belmonte; Fritz Linke Osmin; Otto von Rohr Osmin; Alfred Pfeifle Pedrillo; Gerhard Unger Pedrillo; Heinz Cramer Bassa Selim
Stuttgart State Opera production of Euryanthe by Carl Maria von Weber, August 26, September 3, 8, 1958 (three performances) at the Kings Theatre
Orchestra of the Stuttgart State Opera; Chorus of the Stuttgart State Opera; Lovro von Matačić	Kurt Puhlmann; Gerd Richter settings	Lore Wissmann Euryanthe; Inge Borkh Eglantine	Alexander Welitsch Louis VI; Josef Traxel Adolar; Gustav Neidlinger Lysiart
Stuttgart State Opera production of Tristan und Isolde by Richard Wagner, August 28, 30, September 1, 5, 1958 (four performances) at the Kings Theatre
Orchestra of the Stuttgart State Opera; Chorus of the Stuttgart State Opera; Ferdinand Leitner	Wieland Wagner direction and settings	Martha Mödl Isolde; Astrid Varnay Isolde; Grace Hoffman Brangäne	Wolfgang Windgassen Tristan; Otto von Rohr King Mark; Gustav Neidlinger Kurvenal; Hans Günther Nöcker Melot; Alfred Pfeifle Shepherd; Alfred Wohlgemuth Steersman; Josef Traxel Young sailor Fritz Wunderlich Young sailor
Stuttgart State Opera production of Der Wildschütz by Albert Lortzing, September 1, 6, 1958 (two performances) at the Kings Theatre
Orchestra of the Stuttgart State Opera; Chorus of the Stuttgart State Opera; Ferdinand Leitner	Günther Rennert; Alfred Siercke settings	Hetty Plümacher Countess; Lore Wissmann Baroness Freimann; Sieglinde Kahmann Nanette; Friederike Sailer Gretchen	Karl Schmitt-Walter Count; Fritz Wunderlich Baron Kronthal; Fritz Linke Baculus; Hubert Buchta Pancratius
Edinburgh Festival Society production of La vida breve, accompanied by the ballet El sombrero de tres picos, both with music by Manuel de Falla, September 9, 11, 13, 1958 (three performances) at the Kings Theatre
Cantores de Madrid; Eduard Toldrà	José Caballero settings Leo Anchóriz costumes	Rosario Gomez Countess; Victoria de los Ángeles Salud; Julita Bermejo Carmela	Bernabé Martínez Paco; Joaquín Deus Uncle Sarvaor; Manuel Ausensi Pepe; Manuel Albalat Manuel

== 1959 (five productions) ==
Orchestra, Choir, Conductor	Director, Set Designer	Female singer	Male singer
Royal Opera, Stockholm production of Un ballo in maschera by Giuseppe Verdi, in a Swedish-language version translated by Erik Lindgren August 24, 29, and September 4, 12, 1959 (four performances) at the Kings Theatre
Orchestra of the Royal Opera, Stockholm; Chorus of the Royal Opera, Stockholm; Royal Swedish Ballet; Sixten Ehrling	Göran Gentele; Sven Erik Skawonius settings	Birgit Nilsson Amelia; Aase Nordmo-Lövberg Amelia; Kerstin Meyer Ulrica; Barbro Ericson Ulrica; Birgit Nordin Otto	Ragnar Ulfung Gustav III; Erik Saedén Holberg; Hugo Hasslo Holberg; Bo Lundgren Horn; Arne Tyrén Anckarström; Ingvar Wixell Matts; Arne Ohlson Bishop; Sven Erik Vikström Servant
Royal Opera, Stockholm production of Rigoletto by Giuseppe Verdi August 25, 27, and September 1, 9, 11, 1959 (five performances) at the Kings Theatre
Orchestra of the Royal Opera, Stockholm; Chorus of the Royal Opera, Stockholm; Royal Swedish Ballet; Fausto Cleva	Bengt Peterson; Berger Bergling settings	Margareta Hallin Gilda; Kerstin Meyer Maddalena; Barbro Ericson Maddalena/Giovanna; Margit Sehlmark Giovanna; Ingeborg Kjellgren Countess Ceprano; Birgit Nordin Page	Nicolai Gedda Duke; Uno Stjernqvist Duke; Hugo Hasslo Rigoletto; Arne Tyrén Sparafucile; Sigurd Björling Monterone; Anders Näslund Monterone/Marullo; Erik Saedén Marullo ingvar Wixell Count Ceprano; Bo Lundborg Officer
Royal Opera, Stockholm production of Die Walküre by Richard Wagner August 26, 28, 31, and September 2, 7, 1959 (five performances) at the Kings Theatre
Orchestra of the Royal Opera, Stockholm; Sixten Ehrling	Bengt Peterson; Tor Hörlin settings	Aase Nordmo-Lövberg Sieglinde; Birgit Nilsson Brünnhilde; Kerstin Meyer Fricka/Rossweise; Margareta Bergström Fricka/Grimgerde; Anna-Greta Söderholm Gerhilde; Elisabeth Söderström Orlinde; Ingeborg Kjellgren Waltraute; Margit Sehlmark Schwerteite; Kjerstin Dellert Helmwige; Barbro Ericson Siegrune	Set Svanholm Siegmund; Leon Björker Hunding; Sigurd Björling Wotan
Royal Opera, Stockholm production of Aniara by Karl-Birger Blomdahl September 3, 5, 1959 (two performances) at the Kings Theatre
Orchestra of the Royal Opera, Stockholm; Chorus of the Royal Opera, Stockholm; Royal Swedish Ballet; Sixten Ehrling	Göran Gentele; Sven Erixson settings	Margareta Hallin Blind Poetess; Kjerstin Dellert Daisy Doody/La Garçonne; Mariane Orlando Isagel	Anders Näslund Mimarobe; Erik Saedén Mimarobe; Arne Tyrén Chefone I and II; Sven-Erik Vikström Chief Engineer 1/Blind One; Arne Ohlson Chief Engineer II; Bo Lundborg Chief Engineer III; Olle Sivall Sandon; Ragnar Ulfung Stone-mute Deaf
Royal Opera, Stockholm production of Wozzeck by Alban Berg September 8, 10, 1959 (two performances) at the Kings Theatre
Orchestra of the Royal Opera, Stockholm; Chorus of the Royal Opera, Stockholm; Sixten Ehrling	Göran Gentele; Sven Erixson settings	Elisabeth Söderström Marie; Margareta Bergström Margret; Michel Rhodin Marie's child	Anders Näslund Wozzeck; Erik Saedén Wozzeck; Conny Söderström Drum-Major; Arne Ohlson Andres; Sven-Erik Vikström Captain; Arne Tyrén Doctor; Bo Lundborg First Apprentice; Ingvar Wixell Second Apprentice; Olle Sivall Idiot; Tore Persson Soldier

== 1960 (three productions) ==
Orchestra, Choir, Conductor	Director, Set Designer	Female singer	Male singer
Glyndebourne Opera production of Falstaff by Giuseppe Verdi, August 23, 25, 27, 29, and September 2, 6, 9, 1960 (7 performances) at the Kings Theatre
Royal Philharmonic Orchestra; Vittorio Gui	Carl Ebert; Osbert Lancaster settings	Anna Maria Rota Meg; Ilva Ligabue Alice; Mariella Adani Nannetta; Oralia Dominguez Quickly	Geraint Evans Falstaff; Marco Stefanoni Pistol; Mario Carlin Bardolph; Hugues Cuénod Dr Caius; Sesto Bruscantini Ford; Juan Oncina Fenton; Harold Williams Innkeeper
Glyndebourne Opera production of I puritani by Vincenzo Bellini, August 24, 26, 31, and September 3, 8, 10, 1960 (6 performances) at the Kings Theatre
Royal Philharmonic Orchestra; Vittorio Gui; Bryan Balkwill	Franco Enriquez; Desmond Heeley settings	Monica Sinclair Queen Henrietta; Joan Sutherland Elvira	David Ward Lord Walton; Giuseppe Modesti Sir George Walton; Nicola Filacuridi Lord Arthur Talbot; Ernest Blanc Forth; John Kentish Robertson
Glyndebourne Opera productions of Il segreto di Susanna by Ermanno Wolf-Ferrari, Arlecchino by Ferruccio Busoni, and La voix humaine by Francis Poulenc, August 30, and September 1, 5, 7, 1960 (4 performances) at the Kings Theatre
Royal Philharmonic Orchestra; John Pritchard	Peter Ebert; Carl Toms settings for Il segreto di Susanna; Peter Rice settings for Arlecchino Jean Cocteau productions and settings for La voix humaine	Mariella Adani Countess Helga Pilarczyk Colombina; Silvia Ashmole Annunziata Denise Duval Elle	Sesto Bruscantini Gil; Heinz Blankenburg Sante Ian Wallace Ser Matteo; Heinz Blankenburg Arlecchino; Gwyn Griffiths Cospicuo; Carlos Feller Bombasto; Dermot Troy Leandro

== 1961 (four productions) ==
Orchestra, Choir, Conductor	Director, Set Designer	Female singer	Male singer
Covent Garden Opera production of Iphigénie en Tauride by Christoph Willibald Gluck, August 21, 23, 26, 30 and September 4, 1961 (five performances) at the Kings Theatre
Covent Garden Orchestra; Covent Garden Opera Chorus; Georg Solti; Bryan Balkwill	Göran Gentele; Carl Toms settings	Rita Gorr Iphigénie; Margreta Elkins Diana; Jeannette Sinclair Greek woman	Robert Massard Oreste; André Turp Pylade; Louis Quilico Thoas
Covent Garden Opera production of Lucia di Lammermoor by Gaetano Donizetti, August 25, 28 September 1, 7, 9 1961 (five performances) at the Kings Theatre
Covent Garden Orchestra; Covent Garden Opera Chorus; John Pritchard	Franco Zeffirelli	Joan Sutherland Lucia; Margreta Elkins Alisa	Edgar Evans Normanno; John Shaw Enrico; Joseph Rouleau Raimondo; André Turp Edgardo; Kenneth Macdonald Arturo
Covent Garden Opera production of Il barbiere di Siviglia by Gioachino Rossini, August 31 and September 2, 5, 8 1961 (four performances) at the Kings Theatre
Covent Garden Orchestra; Covent Garden Opera Chorus; Carlo Maria Giulini	Maurice Sarrazin; Jean-Denis Macclés settings	Bianca-Maria Casoni Rosina; Josephine Veasey Berta	Ronald Lewis Fiorello; Luigi Alva Conte; Rolando Panerai Figaro; Fernando Corena Bartolo; Boris Christoff Basilio
Covent Garden Opera production of A Midsummer Night's Dream by Benjamin Britten, August 22, 24, 29, September 2, 6, 1961 (five performances) at the Kings Theatre
Covent Garden Orchestra; Covent Garden Opera Chorus; Georg Solti; Meredith Davies	John Gielgud; John Piper settings	Joan Carlyle Tytania; Irene Salemka Helena; Janet Coster Hermia; Margreta Elkins Hippolyta	Russell Oberlin Oberon; John Dobson Lysander; Peter Glossop Demetrius; Forbes Robinson Theseus; Michael Langdon Quince; Geraint Evans Bottom; Kenneth Macdonald Snout; David Kelly Snug; Joseph Ward Starveling; John Lanigan Flute; Nicolas Chagrin Puck

== 1962 (six productions) ==
Orchestra, Choir, Conductor	Director, Set Designer	Female singer	Male singer
Belgrade Opera production of Prince Igor by Alexander Borodin, August 20, 22, 25, 1962 (three performances) at the Kings Theatre
Orchestra, Chorus and Ballet of the Belgrade Opera; Oskar Danon; Dušan Miladinović	Branko Gavela; Miomir Denić designer Milica Babić costumes	Milka Stojanović Yaroslavna; Biserka Cvejić Konchakovna	Dušan Popović Prince Igor; Zvonimir Krnetić Prince Vladimir; Miroslav Čangalović Prince Galitzky/Kontchak; Žarko Cvejić Prince Galitzky; Djordje Djurdjević Kontchak
Belgrade Opera production of The Love of Three Oranges by Sergei Prokofiev, August 21, 23, 1962 (two performances) at the Kings Theatre
Orchestra, Chorus and Ballet of the Belgrade Opera; Oskar Danon	Mladen Sabljić; Miomir Denić designer Mira Glisić costumes	Milica Miladinović Clarissa; Valerija Hejbalova Fata Morgana; Ljubica Vrsajkov Linetta; Anica Jelinek Nicoletta; Dobrila Bogošević Ninetta; Djurdjevka Čakarević Smeraldina	Žarko Cvejić King of Clubs; Stjepan Andrašević Prince; Jovan Gligorijević Leander; Franjo Paulik Truffaldino; Stanoje Janković Pantaloon; Djordje Djurdjević Tchello; Aleksandar Djokić Cook; Zivojin Milosavljević Farfarello
Belgrade Opera production of Don Quixote by Jules Massenet, August 24, 31, 1962 (two performances) at the Kings Theatre
Orchestra and Chorus of the Belgrade Opera; Oskar Danon	Mladen Sabljić; Miomir Denić designer Mira Glisić costumes	Biserka Cvejić Dulcinea; Dobrila Bogošević Pedro; Ljubica Vrsajkov Garcias	Miroslav Čangalović Don Quixote; Ladko Korošec Sancho Panza; Nikola Jančić Rodriguez; Drago Starc Juan; Zivojin Mitrović Fool
Belgrade Opera production of Khovanshchina by Modest Mussorgsky, version by Dmitri Shostakovich, August 27, 29, and September 1, 1962 (three performances) at the Kings Theatre
Orchestra, Chorus and Ballet of the Belgrade Opera; Krešimir Baranović; Dušan Miladinović	Mladen Sabljić; Miomir Denić designer Milica Babić costumes	Melanija Bugarinović Martha; Milica Miladinović Martha; Milka Stojanović Emma	Žarko Cvejić Prince Ivan Khovansky; Zvonimir Krnetić Prince Andrei Khovansky; Franjo Pulik Prince Basil Galitzin; Dušan Popović Shaklovity; Stanoje Janković Shaklovity; Miroslav Čangalović Dosifey; Djordje Djurdjević Dosifey; Vladan Cvejić Scrivener
Belgrade Opera production of The Gambler by Sergei Prokofiev, August 28, 30, 1962 (two performances) at the Kings Theatre
Orchestra and Chorus of the Belgrade Opera; Oskar Danon	Mladen Sabljić; Miomir Denić designer Milica Babić costumes	Valerija Hejbalova Pauline; Djurdjevka Čakarević Babushka; Milica Miladinović Blanche	Žarko Cvejić Retired general Drago Starc Alexei; Stjepan Andrašević Marquis; Stanoje Janković Mr Astle; Nikola Jančić Prince Nilsky; Vlastimir Stefanović Baron Wirmerhelm; Živojin Mitrović Potopitch
English Opera Group production of The Turn of the Screw by Benjamin Britten, September 3, 5, 7, 1962 (three performances) at the Kings Theatre
English Chamber Orchestra; Benjamin Britten; Meredith Davies	Basil Coleman; John Piper designer	Jennifer Vyvyan Governess; Ellen Dales Flora; Sylvia Fisher Mrs Grose; Marie Collier Miss Jessel	Peter Pears Prologue/Quint; John Lanigan Prologue/Quint; Kevin Platts Miles

== 1963 (six productions) ==
Orchestra, Choir, Conductor	Director, Set Designer	Female singer	Male singer
English Opera Group production of The Rape of Lucretia by Benjamin Britten, August 19, 21, 23 1963 (three performances) at the Kings Theatre
Meredith Davies	Colin Graham; Tony Walton settings	Kerstin Meyer Lucretia; Helen Watts Bianca; Elizabeth Vaughan Lucia; Sylvia Fisher Female chorus	Forbes Robinson Collatinus; John Shirley-Quirk Junius; Peter Glossop Tarquinius; Ronald Dowd Male chorus
English Opera Group production of The Beggar's Opera by John Gay and Johann Christoph Pepusch, August 20, 22, 24 1963 (three performances) at the Kings Theatre
Benjamin Britten	Colin Graham; Alix Stone settings	Anne Pollak Mrs Peachum; Janet Baker Polly Peachum; Heather Harper Lucy; Edith Coates Mrs Diana Trapes; Joan Edwards Jenny Diver	David Kelly Peachum; Peter Pears Macheath; Bryan Drake Lockit
Teatro San Carlo, Naples production of Luisa Miller by Giuseppe Verdi, August 26, 28, 31 and September 4, 1963 (four performances) at the Kings Theatre
Orchestra and chorus of the Teatro di San Carlo Alberto Erede	Franco Enriquez; Attilio Colonello settings	Anna di Stasio Laura; Margherita Roberti Luisa; Anna Maria Rota Federica d'Ostheim	Piero Cappuccilli Miller; Renato Cioni Rodolpho; Franco Ventriglia Wurm; Paolo Washington Count Walter; Vittorio Pandano Peasant
Teatro San Carlo, Naples production of Adriana Lecouvreur by Francesco Cilea, August 27, 30 and September 2, 6, 1963 (four performances) at the Kings Theatre
Orchestra and chorus of the Teatro di San Carlo Oliviero De Fabritiis	Aldo Mirabella Vassallo; Camillo Paravicini settings	Magda Olivero Adriana Lecouvreur; Adriana Lazzarini Princesse de Bouillon; Elena Barcis Mlle Jouvenot; Anna di Stasio Mlle Dangeville	Juan Oncina Maurizio; Enrico Campi Prince de Bouillon; Piero de Palma Abate di Chazeuil; Sesto Bruscantini Michonnet; Augusto Frati Quinault; Vittorio Pandano Poisson
Teatro San Carlo, Naples production of Don Pasquale by Gaetano Donizetti, August 29 and September 3, 5, 7 1963 (four performances) at the Kings Theatre
Orchestra and chorus of the Teatro di San Carlo; Alberto Erede	Eduardo de Filippo; Ezio Frigerio settings	Gianna D'Angelo Norina	Fernando Corena Don Pasquale; Renato Capecchi Malatesta; Alfredo Kraus Ernesto; Ugo d'Alessio Carlo
Budapest Opera and Ballet production of Prince Bluebeard's Castle together with the ballets The Wooden Prince and The Miraculous Mandarin, all by Béla Bartók, August 19, 20, 21, 23, 1963 (four performances) at the Empire Theatre
Scottish National Orchestra; János Ferencsik	Kálmán Nádasdy	Olga Szönyi Judith	András Faragó Duke Bluebeard

== 1964 (five productions) ==
Orchestra, Choir, Conductor	Director, Set Designer	Female singer	Male singer
National Theatre, Prague production of Dalibor (Bedřich Smetana) 17, 20, 22, 27 August, 3 September 1964 (five performances) at the Kings Theatre
Jaroslav Krombholc	Václav Kašlík; Josef Svoboda sets Jarmila Konečná costumes	Alena Míková Milada; Libuše Prylová Milada; Milada Šubrtová Milada; Libuše Domanínská Jitka; Helena Tattermuschová Jitka; Eva Zikmundová Jitka	Václav Bednář Vladislav; Jindřich Jindrák Vladislav; Vilém Přibyl Dalibor; Beno Blachut Dalibor; Antonín Švorc Budivoj; Jaroslav Horáček Judge; Dalibor Jedlička Judge/Beneš; Eduard Haken Beneš; Zdenĕk Švehla Vítek; Viktor Kočí Vítek
National Theatre, Prague production of Resurrection (Ján Cikker) 18, 26 August 1964 (two performances) at the Kings Theatre
Jaroslav Krombholc	Karel Jernek; Zbynĕk Kolář sets Olga Filipi costumes	Milada Čadikovičová Sophia Ivanovna; Nadĕžda Kniplová Maria Ivanovna; Alena Míková Katya; Helena Tattermuschová Eufemia Bochkova; Jaroslava Procházková Madame Kitayev	Teodor Šrubař Prince Dmitry; Milan Karpíšek Smelkov; Jiří Joran Kartinkin; Beno Blachut Simonson
National Theatre, Prague production of Rusalka (Antonín Dvořák) 19, 21, 25, 29, 31 August 1964 (five performances) at the Kings Theatre
Jan Hus Tichy	Václav Kašlík; Josef Svoboda sets Jarmila Konečná costumes	Milada Šubrtová Rusalka; Libuše Domanínská Rusalka; Jaroslava Dobrá Ježibaba; Jaroslava Procházková Ježibaba; Marta Krásová Ježibaba; Libuše Prylová Foreign Princess; Nadĕžda Kniplová Foreign Princess	Ivo Žídek Prince; Beno Blachut Prince; Eduard Haken Vodník; Karel Berman Vodník; Jiří Joran Gamekeeper; Antonín Votava Gamekeeper
National Theatre, Prague production of Kátya Kabanová (Leoš Janáček) 24 August, 1, 4 September 1964 (three performances) at the Kings Theatre
Jaroslav Krombholc	Hanuš Thein; Josef Svoboda sets Marcel Pokorný costumes	Jaroslava Dobrá Marfa Kabanová; Jaroslava Procházková Marfa Kabanová; Ivana Mixová Varvara; Libuše Domanínská Katya; Eva Zikmundová Katya; Sylvia Kodetová Glaša	Jaroslav Stříška Tikhon Kabanov; Karel Berman Savël Dikoj; Viktor Kočí Boris; Beno Blachut Boris; Zdenĕk Švehla Váňa Kudrjaš; Jindřich Jindrák Kuligin
National Theatre, Prague production of From the House of the Dead (Leoš Janáček), 28 August, 2, 5 September 1964 (three performances) at the Kings Theatre
Bohumil Gregor	Ladislav Štros; Vladimir Nývlt sets Marcel Pokorný costumes	Helena Tattermuschová Aljeja	Dalibor Jedličk Gorjančikov; Beno Blachut Filka Morozov; Jaroslav Horáček Prison Governor; Antonín Švorc Prison Governor; Ivo Žídek Skuratov; Milan Karpíšek Šapkin; Přemysl Kočí Šiškov

== 1965 (five productions) ==
Orchestra, Choir, Conductor	Director, Set Designer	Female singer	Male singer
Edinburgh Festival Opera and Holland Festival co-production of Don Giovanni by Wolfgang Amadeus Mozart, August 23, 25, 28, September 1, 3, 1965 (five performances) at the Kings Theatre
New Philharmonia Orchestra; Netherlands Chamber Choir; Carlo Maria Giulini	Carlo Maria Giulini; David Walker costumes	Luisa Bosabalian Donna Anna; Ilva Ligabue Donna Elvira; Mariella Adani Zerlina	Paolo Montarsolo Leporello; Renato Capecchi Don Giovanni; Giorgio Tadeo Commendatore; Richard Lewis Don Ottavio; Leonardo Monreale Masetto
Edinburgh Festival Opera and Holland Festival co-production of Pescatrici by Joseph Haydn, August 24, 26, 27, 1965 (three performances) at the Kings Theatre
Alberto Erede	Werner Düggelin; Jörn Zimmermann settings	Ruza Pospis Eurilda; Maddalena Bonifaccio Lesbina; Adriana Martino Nerina	Ugo Trama Lindoro; Umberto Grilli Burlotto; Giacomo Aragall Frisellino; Carlos Feller Mastriccio
English Opera Group production of Albert Herring by Benjamin Britten, August 31, and September 2, 4, 1965 (three performances) at the Kings Theatre
Vilém Tauský	Colin Graham; John Piper settings	Sylvia Fisher Lady Billows; Johanna Peters Florence Pike; April Cantelo Miss Wordsworth; Anne Pashley Nancy; Sheila Rex Mrs Herring	Bryan Drake Mr Gedge; Edgar Evans Mr Upfold; Harold Blackburn Superintendent Budd; Benjamin Luxon Sid; Kenneth Macdonald Albert Herring
Bavarian State Opera production of Così fan tutte by Wolfgang Amadeus Mozart, September 6, 7, 8, 10, 1965 (four performances) at the Kings Theatre
Orchestra of the Bavarian State Opera; Hans Gierster	Rudolf Hartmann; Helmut Jürgens settings	Claire Watson Fiordiligi; Leonore Kirschstein Fiordiligi; Hertha Töpper Dorabella; Lilian Benningsen Dorabella; Hanny Steffek Despina; Gertrud Freedmann Despina	Fritz Wunderlich Ferrando; Donald Grobe Ferrando; Raimund Grumbach Guglielmo; Keith Engen Don Alfonso; Karl Christian Kohn Don Alfonso
Bavarian State Opera production of Intermezzo by Richard Strauss, September 9, 11, 1965 (two performances) at the Kings Theatre
Orchestra of the Bavarian State Opera; Meinhard von Zallinger	Rudolf Hartmann; Jean-Pierre Ponnelle settings	Hanny Steffek Christine; Gertrud Freedmann Anna	Hermann Prey Storch; Ferry Gruber Baron Lummer; Karl Christian Kohn Councillor of Commerce; Max Proebstl Kammersänger; Friedrich Lenz Kapellmeister Stroh; Hans-Hermann Nissen Councillor of Justice

== 1966 (four productions) ==
Orchestra, Choir, Conductor	Director, Set Designer	Female singer	Male singer
Stuttgart State Opera production of The Magic Flute by Wolfgang Amadeus Mozart, August 26, 29, 31, September 2, 5, 1966 (five performances) at the Kings Theatre
Ferdinand Leitner	Leopold Lindtberg; Leni Bauer-Ecsy settings	Elisabeth Löw-Szöky First Lady; Hetty Plümacher Second Lady; Claudia Hellman Third Lady; Sylvia Geszty Queen of the Night; Gundula Janowitz Pamina; Liselotte Rebmann Pamina; Lily Sauter Papagena	Waldemar Kmentt Tamino; Fritz Wunderlich Tamino; Karlheinz Peters Papageno; Herold Kraus Monostatos; Raymond Wolansky Speaker; Stefan Kosso Speaker; Otto von Rohr Sarastro; Fritz Linke Sarastro
Stuttgart State Opera production of Wozzeck by Alban Berg, August 27, 1966 (one performance) at the Kings Theatre
Carlos Kleiber	Günther Rennert; Leni Bauer-Ecsy settings	Irmgard Seefried Marie	Gerhard Stolze Wozzeck; Kurt Marschner Captain; Sigurd Björnsson Andres; Fritz Linke Doctor; Günther Treptow Drum Major
Stuttgart State Opera production of Lohengrin by Richard Wagner, August 30, September 1, 7, 9, 1966 (four performances) at the Kings Theatre
Ferdinand Leitner; Heinrich Hollreiser	Wieland Wagner director and designer	Hildegard Hillebrecht Elsa; Elisabeth Löw-Szöky Elsa; Grace Hoffman Ortrud	Raymond Wolansky Herald; Karlheinz Peters Herald; Otto von Rohr Heinrich; Gustav Neidlinger Friedrich von Telramund; Wolfgang Windgassen Lohengrin
Stuttgart State Opera production of Lulu by Alban Berg, September 6, 8, 10, 1966 (three performances) at the Kings Theatre
Ferdinand Leitner	Wieland Wagner director and designer	Anja Silja Lulu; Sona Cervena Countess Geschwitz; Paula Brivkalne Dresser; Hannelore Schultz-Pickard Schoolboy	Rudolf Knoll Prologue/Jack the Ripper; Richard Holm Alwa; Carlos Alexander Dr Schön; James Harper Painter; Engelbert Czubok Doctor; Willy Ferenz Schigolch; Stefan Schwer Prince; Heinz Cramer Theatre Director; Caspar Bröcheler Rodrigo; Kurt-Egon Opp Man servant Klaus Hirte African

== See also ==
- Opera at the Edinburgh International Festival: history and repertoire, 1947–1956
- Opera at the Edinburgh International Festival: history and repertoire, 1967–1976
- Drama at the Edinburgh International Festival: history and repertoire, 1947–1956
- Drama at the Edinburgh International Festival: history and repertoire, 1957–1966
- Drama at the Edinburgh International Festival: history and repertoire, 1967–1976
- Ballet at the Edinburgh International Festival: history and repertoire, 1947–1956
- Ballet at the Edinburgh International Festival: history and repertoire, 1957–1966
- Ballet at the Edinburgh International Festival: history and repertoire, 1967–1976
- Musicians at the Edinburgh International Festival, 1947–1956
- Musicians at the Edinburgh International Festival, 1957–1966
- Musicians at the Edinburgh International Festival, 1967–1976
- Visual Arts at the Edinburgh International Festival, 1947–1976
- World premieres at the Edinburgh International Festival
- Edinburgh Festival Fringe
- List of Edinburgh festivals
- List of opera festivals
