= Helena Tattermuschová =

Czech operatic soprano (1933–2025)

- Tattermuschová in the 1960s
- Born: 28 January 1933; Prague, Czechoslovakia
- Died: 6 July 2025 (aged 92); Prague, Czech Republic
- Education: Academy of Music in Prague
- Occupations: Operatic soprano; Academic teacher
- Organizations: Prague National Theatre; Prague Conservatory
- Awards: Thalia Award

Helena Tattermuschová (28 January 1933 – 6 July 2025) was a Czech lyric coloratura soprano who made an international career. Based at the Prague National Theatre from 1956 to 1991, she appeared chiefly in Mozart roles and Czech operas, such as the title role of Janáček's The Cunning Little Vixen, Terinka in Dvořák's The Jacobin, and Blaženka in Smetana's The Secret.

== Early life ==
Tattermuschová was born in Prague on 28 January 1933. She grew up in a large working-class family in the Libeň district of Prague. She received her earliest vocal training from her school choirmaster, Václav Matoušek. Upon finishing municipal school, she studied vocal performance with Vlasta Linhartová at the Academy of Music in Prague from 1948 to 1953. She then studied at the Music and Dance Faculty of the Academy of Performing Arts in Prague with Jaromíra Tomášková from 1953 to 1954. During her studies, she performed in the University Art Ensemble of Charles University from 1950 to 1954. She already appeared at the Prague National Theatre (then called Smetana Theatre) from June 1953, as the servant girl Barče in Smetana's The Kiss, the kitchen boy Kuchtik in Dvořák's Rusalka, Esmeralda in Smetana's The Bartered Bride and Pasáček in Eugen Suchoň's Krútňava. She won the second prize in the Prague Spring singing competition in 1954 and the same year was named a laureate in the soprano category of the international competition named for legendary Czech opera stars Emmy Destinn (Ema Destinnová) and Karel Burian in Prague.

== Career ==
Upon completion of her studies, Tattermuschová was engaged by the Zdeněk Nejedlý Theatre of the Ostrava Opera (now the National Moravian-Silesian Theatre), first as Musetta in Puccini's La bohème in 1955. Guided by the musical director Rudolf Vašata, she performed there in 22 roles, including 14 leading roles. She possessed a high lyric soprano voice, which led her to be cast in youthful and trouser roles for many years into her career. She appeared in Ostrava as Olympia in Offenbach's Les contes d'Hoffmann, the title role in Verdi's La traviata, Ludiše in Smetana's The Brandenburgers in Bohemia, all in 1955, and Konstanze in Mozart's Die Entführung aus dem Serail in 1956.

Tattermuschová became a member of the Prague National Theatre in 1956 where she continued to sing for 35 years, until 1991. Tattermuschová's distinctively girlish vocal quality led to roles in Mozart's operas such as Papagena in Die Zauberflöte, Zerlina in Don Giovanni and Susanna in Le nozze di Figaro. She also appeared in the coloratura roles of Rosina in Rossini's Il barbiere di Siviglia and Gilda in Verdi's Rigoletto.

Tattermuschová's singular contribution was singing the Czech repertoire on the national and international stage as well as on recordings. She enjoyed one of her greatest triumphs in 1970 in the title role of Janáček's The Cunning Little Vixen, which she subsequently recorded. A reviewer from Gramophone noted described her performance as "captivating, warm, slyly feminine", and "brightly and sensitively sung". The film of that production went on to be awarded the Charles Cros Academy Grand Prix, the Golden Record from Japan and the Prague Spring Award.

Her youthful voice suited Tattermuschová to the key role of the boy Aljeja in the nearly all-male cast of Janáček's From the House of the Dead (also performed at the 1964 Edinburgh Festival). She also portrayed Kristina in The Makropulos Affair. She sang in Czech operas by Smetana: The Councillor’s daughter Blaženka in The Secret, Jitka in Dalibor, the merry widow Karolina in The Two Widows, and Katuška in The Devil's Wall, and by Dvořák, the schoolmaster’s daughter Terinka in The Jacobin. Her roles also included Mozart's Blonde in Die Entführung aus dem Serail and Despina in Così fan tutte, Oscar in Un ballo in maschera and Nanetta in Falstaff (both by Verdi); and Micaela in Bizet's Carmen. She appeared in works by Puccini such as Mimi in La bohème, Liú in Turandot, Madama Butterfly and Lauretta in Gianni Schicchi; as well as Sophie in Der Rosenkavalier by Richard Strauss. She was said to have given her roles character, "acting gracefully and vividly, with a gentle sense of humour".

Outside of Czechoslovakia, Tattermuschová appeared as a guest artist at the Liceu in Barcelona, La Monnaie in Brussels, Amsterdam, the National Opera of Bulgaria in Sofia, the Grand Theatre, Warsaw, in Naples, and Venice. She performed in the UK premiere of Janáček's The Excursions of Mr. Brouček to the Moon at the Edinburgh Festival.

Tattermuschová made eighty recordings for Czechoslovak Radio. She was active in recitals and concerts, not only in standard repertoire by Mozart, Haydn and Dvořák, but also in new works such as Svatopluk Havelka's Praise of Light and Honegger's Cris du Monde. She performed in Beethoven's Ninth Symphony, and in Bach's Mass in B minor and St Matthew Passion.

== Later years ==
From 1977 to 1991, Tattermuschová taught opera vocal performance at the Prague Conservatory. She received a Thalia Award in 2013 for her lifetime achievements.

Tattermuschová died in Prague on 6 July 2025, aged 92.

== Recordings ==
Tattermuschová made most recordings for the label Supraphon, with the Prague National Theatre Chorus and Orchestra.

- Janáček: The Cunning Little Vixen (in the title role), with Eva Zikmundová and Zdeněk Kroupa, conducted by Bohumil Gregor OCLC 643453902
- Janáček: The Cunning Little Vixen (as Cocholka the Hen), conducted by Václav Neumann OCLC 659254891
- Janáček: The Makropulos Affair (as Kristina), with Libuše Prylová, Ivo Žídek and Viktor Kočí, conducted by Gregor OCLC 1344380029
- Janáček: Jenůfa (as Jano), with Libuše Domanínská, Vilém Přibyl and Žídek, conducted by Gregor OCLC 909124452
- Janáček: From the House of the Dead (as Aljeja), with Václav Bednář, Beno Blachut and Žídek, conducted by Gregor OCLC 753153998
- Gluck: Szenen aus seinen Opern, Orpheus (as Amore), with Věra Soukupová and Naděžda Kniplová, conducted by Peter Maag OCLC 1281915242
- Smetana: Libuše with Niplová, Bednář, Pribyl, Milada Šubrtová, Soukupová, Kroupa and Žídek, conducted by Jaroslav Krombholc OCLC 1514701305
- Orff: Trionfi, Catulli Carmina, with Žídek, conducted by Václav Smetáček OCLC 761612147
- Pavel Kovařovic: Psohlavci with Antonín Votava, Blachut, Drahomíra Tikalová, Marta Krásová, Zdeněk Otava, conducted by František Dyk OCLC 1385403312
- Jakub Jan Ryba: My Lovely Nightingale (Pastorella for soprano, flute, organ & orchestra), conducted by Smetáček OCLC 839074283
- Honegger: Cris du monde (Oratorio for vocal soloists, chorus and orchestra), conducted by Serge Baudo OCLC 716412553
- Luboš Fišer: Lament Over the Ruined Town of Ur (and other works) with Karel Berman, conducted by Pavel Kühn OCLC 1026411711
