= Libuše Domanínská =

Czech opera singer (1924–2021)

- Domanínská in the 1970s
- Born: Libuše Klobásková; 4 July 1924; Brno, Czechoslovakia
- Died: 2 February 2021 (aged 96); Hodonín, Czech Republic
- Other name: Libuše Vyčichlová
- Occupation: Operatic soprano
- Organizations: Brno National Theatre; Prague National Theatre

Libuše Domanínská (née Klobásková, married Vyčichlová; 4 July 1924 – 2 February 2021) was a Czech classical soprano who had a career in concert and opera from the 1940s through the 1970s. She was a leading member of the Brno National Theatre and later the Prague National Theatre where she sang a repertoire of 50 roles, especially as Janáček's Jenůfa, Káťa Kabanová and The Cunning Little Vixen. She was instrumental in making the composer's operas known internationally, both in recordings and guest appearances.

== Life and career ==
Libuše Klobásková was born in Brno, Czechoslovakia, on 4 July 1924. Her father was a wine expert, and her family moved from Moravia to Košice in the Slovak part of the country, where she first performed on a stage in an amateur theatre show at age five. At age eight, she was nicknamed "the lark of Košice" when she sang for a local radio. When an independent Slovakia was proclaimed in 1939 under the Nazis, many Czechs were expelled from Slovakia, and her family moved to Brno. At age 15, she applied for studies at the conservatory, but was regarded as not strong enough for singing. In 1940, she was accepted, and studied with Hana Pírková and Bohuslaw Soběský. The conductor Břetislav Bakala let her perform with his orchestra for the Brno radio in her third year of studies. He would study the role of Káťa Kabanová with her. She appeared more often on radio which in the 1940s meant live performances.

After World War II, she continued her singing studies, also with Marie Řezníčková, and at the same time appeared at the Brno National Theatre. She made her stage debut as Blaženka in Smetana's The Secret in August 1945 and became a leading member at the house, where she remained for ten seasons. Her soprano voice, described as a warm spinto "gifted in cantilena and capable of delicate expressive nuances", was suitable to roles by Smetana and Janáček's Jenůfa, Káťa Kabanová and The Cunning Little Vixen. She became a member of the Prague National Theatre in 1955, performing altogether 50 roles, including besides the Czech repertoire also Mozart operas, Italian repertoire such as Verdi's Aida and Elisabetta in Don Carlos, and Russian operas. She performed in all of Janáček's operas.

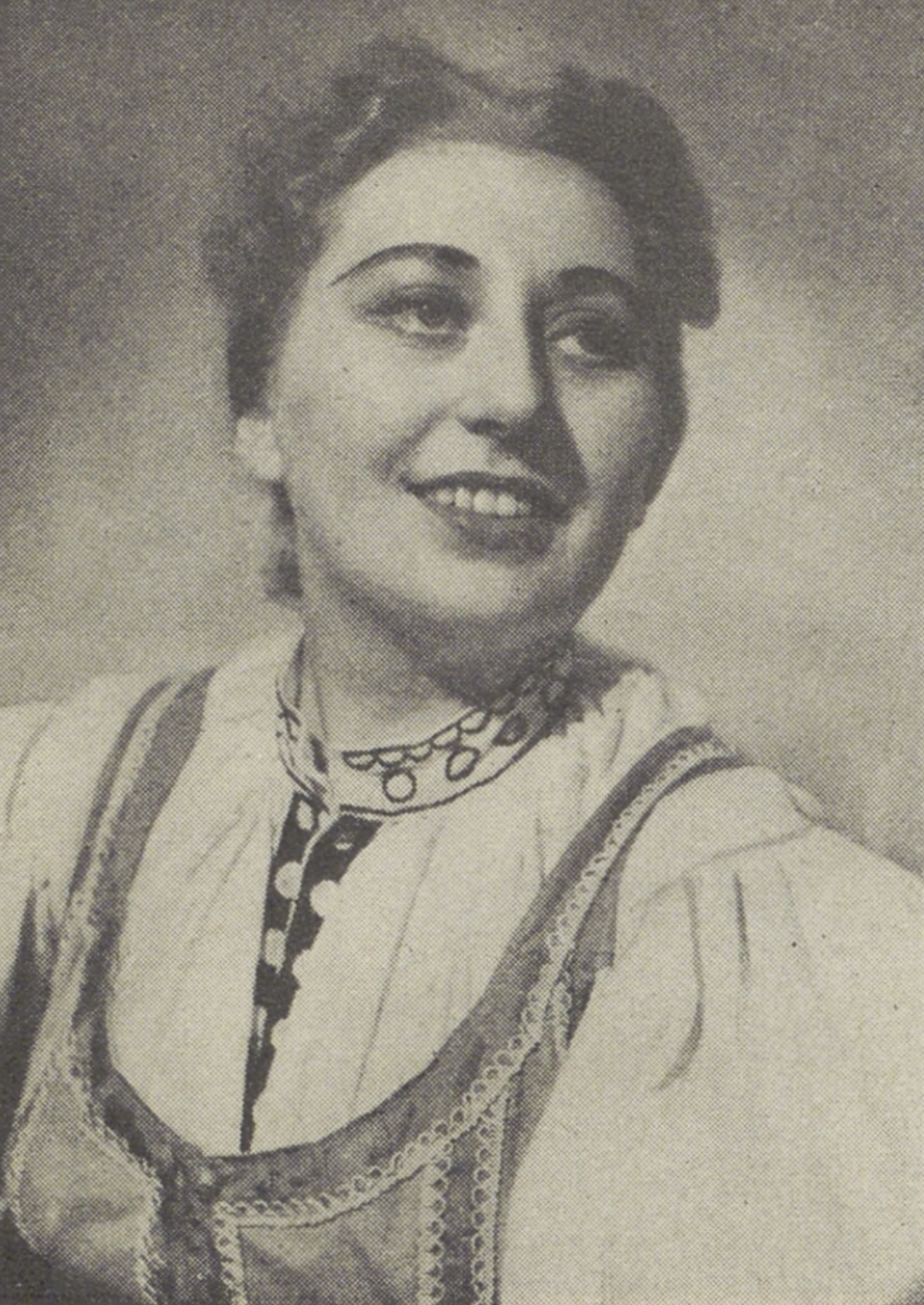
As Jenůfa in 1955

With the Prague company, she toured to Moscow in 1955, to the Holland Festival in 1959, and to the Edinburgh Festival, where she appeared in 1964 in roles from Czech operas: Jitka in Smetana's Dalibor in the English premiere of the opera, and the title roles in Dvořák's Rusalka and Janáček'sKáťa Kabanová. The company also performed at the Sibelius Festival in Helsinki. She sang as a guest at the Komische Oper Berlin in 1956, at both the Teatro Colón in Buenos Aires and the Teatro di San Carlo in Naples in 1968, and regularly at the Wiener Volksoper from 1958 to 1965.

Domanínská recorded the title role of Jenůfa in 1970. It was the first stereo recording of the opera, paving the way for more recordings of Janáček's operas and for greater recognition of his work around the world. A reviewer of Gramophone wrote when it was reissued in 1995: "Libuše Domanínská is a tender Jenufa, vulnerable near the start but also in her own way deepening in human understanding as the drama develops; and her response to the music at the end, as she forgives the Kostelnička and takes Laca, is true to Janáček's soaring melodic phrases." She performed alongside Naděžda Kniplová as the Kostelnička, Ivo Žídek as Steva, and Vilém Přibyl as Laca, conducted by Bohumil Gregor.

In concert, she performed oratorios and masses by Bach, Handel, Haydn, Mozart, Beethoven and Dvořák, and Lieder. She sang the soprano solo of Janáček's Glagolitic Mass at La Scala in Milan.

Domanínská died in Hodonín on 2 February 2021, at the age of 96.

=== Roles in Prague ===
The roles that Domanínská performed in Prague include:

Composer	Opera	Opera in English	Role	Year
Foerster	Eva		Eva	1949
Smetana	Hubička	The Kiss	Vendulka	1950
Dvořák	Rusalka		Rusalka	1950
Dmitry Kabalevsky	Tarasova rodina	The Taras Family	Nasťa	1952
Mussorgsky	Boris Godunov		Xénie	1953
Bizet	Carmen		Micaela	1953
Smetana	Libuše	Libussa	Krasava	1953
Janáček	Příhody lišky Bystroušky	The Cunning Little Vixen	Lišák	1954
Smetana	Dalibor		Jitka	1954
Janáček	Její pastorkyňa	Jenůfa	Jenůfa	1954
Smetana	Prodaná nevěsta	The Bartered Bride	Mařenka	1954
Dvořák	Rusalka		Rusalka	1954
Janáček	Věc Makropulos	The Makropulos Affair	Kristýnka	1955
Verdi	Aida		Aida	1956
Boleslav Vomáčka	Boleslav I		Běla	1956
Janáček	Káťa Kabanová		Káťa	1956
Mozart	Kouzelná flétna	The Magic Flute	First Lady	1956
Dvořák	Král a uhlíř	King and Charcoal Burner	Liduška	1956
Tchaikovsky	Piková dáma	Queen of Spades	Eliza	1956
Fibich	Šárka		Libyna	1956
Mozart	Ženy jsou ženy	Così fan tutte	Fiordiligi	1957
Handel	Acis y Galathea	Acis and Galatea	Galathea	1958
Verdi	Don Carlos		Eisabetta	1959
Gluck	Orfeo ed Eurydice		Eurydice	1959
Smetana	Braniboři v Čechách	The Brandenburgers in Bohemia	Ludiše	1960
Dvořák	Jakobín		Terinka	1960
Prokofiev	Příběh opravdového člověka	The Story of a Real Man	Varja	1960
Jaroslav Doubrava	Balada o lásce		Kateřina	1961
Verdi	Othello		Desdemona	1964
Verdi	Nabucco		Abigail	1965
Dvořák	Čert a Káča	The Devil and Kate	Káča	1965
Puccini	Madama Butterfly		Čo-Čo-San	1966
Martinů	Hry o Marii	The Tales of Mary	Mariken z Niměgue	1968
Tchaikovsky	Evžen Oněgin	Eugene Onegin	Larina	1969
Offenbach	Hoffmannovy povídky	The Tales of Hoffmann	Giulietta	1970
Prokofiev	Vojna a mír	War and Peace	Paní Peronská	1970
Strauss	Arabela	Arabella	Kartářka	1971
Wagner	Valkýra	Die Walküre	Waltraute	1971
Karminskij	Deset dnů, které otřásly světem		Bolševička	1972
Suchoň	Krútňava	The Whirlpool	Žena	1972
Smetana	Tajemství	The Secret	Hospodská	1972
