= Provisional Theatre (Prague) =

Theatre in 19th-century Prague

Coordinates: 50.0807°N 14.4136°E

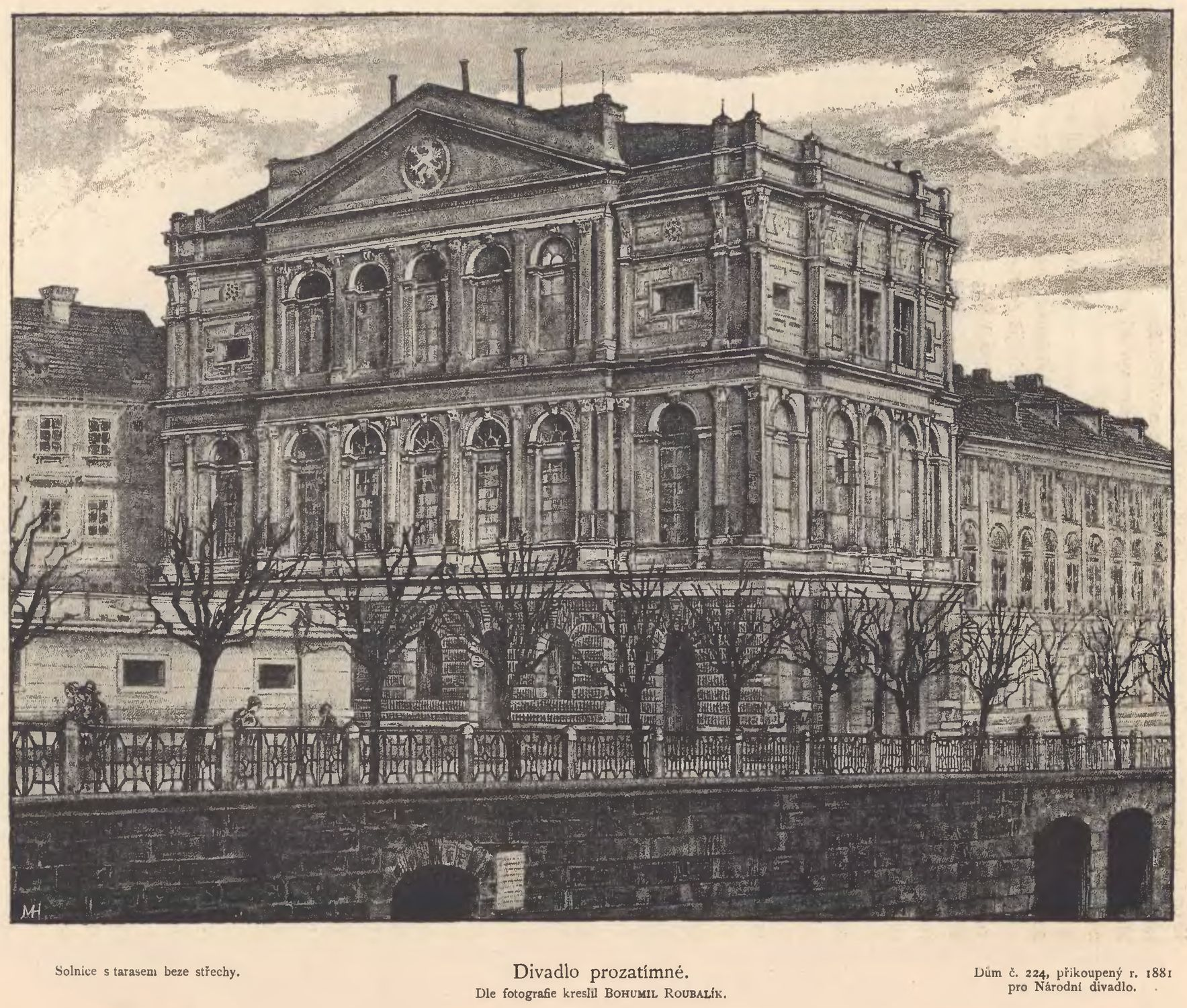
Prague Provisional Theatre on historic painting

The Prague Provisional Theatre (Czech: Prozatímní divadlo, Czech pronunciation: [ˈprozaciːmɲiː ˈɟɪvadlo]) was erected in 1862 as a temporary home for Czech drama and opera until a permanent National Theatre could be built. It opened on 18 November 1862 and functioned for 20 years, during which time over 5,000 performances were presented. Between 1866 and 1876 the theatre staged the premieres of four of Bedřich Smetana's operas, including The Bartered Bride. The Provisional Theatre building was eventually incorporated into the structure of the National Theatre, which opened its doors on 11 June 1881.

== Origins ==
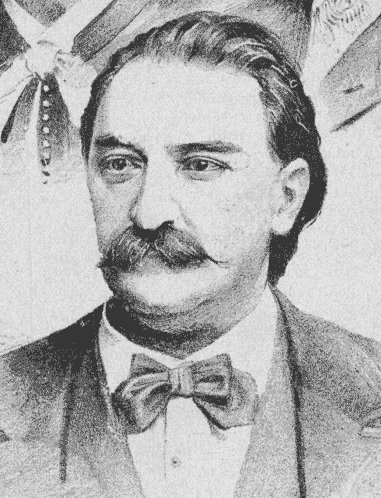
Jan Nepomuk Maýr, first Principal Conductor of the Prague Provisional Theatre

Before the early 1860s almost all cultural institutions in Prague, including theatre and opera, were in Austrian hands. Bohemia was a province of the Habsburg Empire, and under that regime's absolutist rule most aspects of Czech culture and national life had been discouraged or suppressed. Absolutism was formally abolished by a decree of the Emperor Franz Josef on 20 October 1860, which led to a Czech cultural revival. The Bohemian Diet (parliament) had acquired a site in Prague on the banks of the Vltava, and in 1861 announced a public subscription, which raised a sum of 106,000 florins. This covered the costs of building a small 800-seat theatre, which would act as a home for production of Czech drama and opera while longer-term plans for a permanent National Theatre could be implemented. The Provisional Theatre opened on 18 November 1862, with a performance of Vítězslav Hálek's tragic drama King Vukašín. Since there was at the time no Czech opera deemed suitable, the first opera performed at the theatre, on 20 November 1862, was Cherubini's Les deux journées. For the first year or so of its life, the Provisional Theatre alternated opera with straight plays on a daily basis, but from the start of 1864 opera performances were given daily.

== History ==
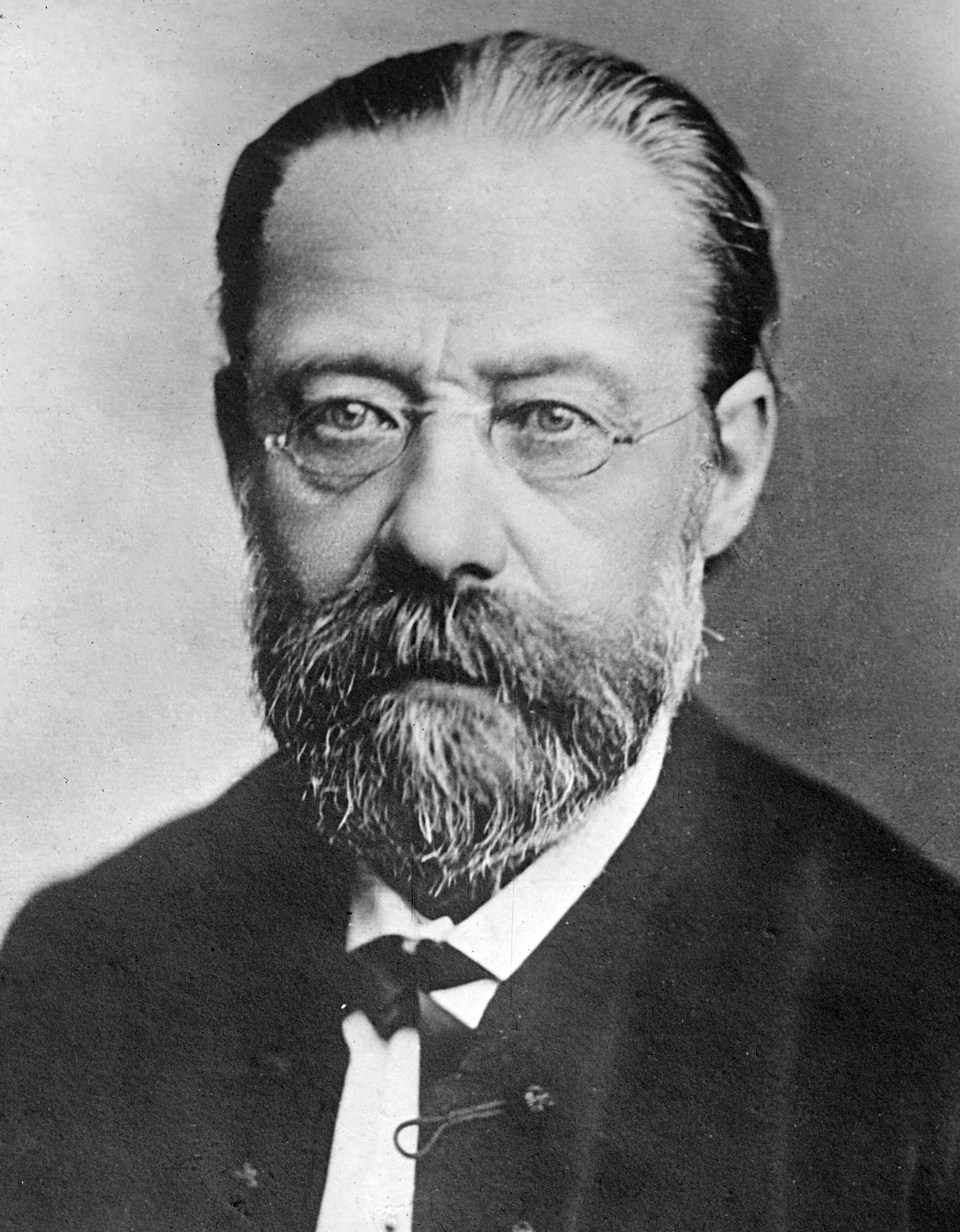
Bedřich Smetana, who succeeded Maýr as Principal Conductor, and was in turn succeeded by him

The first principal conductor (or musical director) of the Provisional Theatre, appointed in the autumn of 1862, was Jan Nepomuk Maýr – to the disappointment of Smetana, who had hoped for the position himself. Maýr held the position until September 1866; his tenure was marked by a professional rivalry with Smetana, who criticised the theatre's conservatism and failure to fulfil its mission to promote Czech opera. Maýr retaliated by refusing to conduct Smetana's The Brandenburgers in Bohemia. A change in the theatre's management in 1866 led to Maýr's removal and replacement by Smetana, who held the post for eight years. Maýr's bias in favour of Italian opera was replaced by Smetana's more balanced repertoire, which mixed Italian, German and French pieces with such Slavonic and Czech works as he could find. Apart from his own compositions (The Bartered Bride, The Brandenburgers in Bohemia and Dalibor, Smetana introduced works by the Czech composers Lepold Eugen Měchura and Josef Rozkošný, but was nevertheless attacked by some parts of the music establishment for giving insufficient encouragement to native talent. Efforts to remove him from his post, and to reinstate Maýr, were unsuccessful.

Smetana was responsible for the establishment of an independent school attached to the theatre. He became the school's director and professor of theory. However, in 1874 Smetana became afflicted with deafness, which forced him to yield his duties as principal conductor to his assistant Adolf Čech, and to resign his post later that year. Maýr was reappointed to the conductorship; he had no interest in the school, which subsequently closed. The Provisional Theatre continued as the main venue for Czech opera, several of Antonín Dvořák's works being premiered there. In 1881 the theatre was incorporated into the Czech National Theatre building, which opened on 11 June. Shortly thereafter the new building was badly damaged by fire and remained closed for two years. During this period the Provisional Theatre continued to operate, using other theatre premises. During its lifetime the Provisional theatre mounted more than 5,000 performances.

== Sources ==
- Clapham, John (1972). Smetana (Master Musicians series). London: J.M. Dent. ISBN 0-460-03133-3.
- Large, Brian (1970). Smetana. London: Duckworth. ISBN 0-7156-0512-7.
- "The National Theatre". Narodni divaldo.
- Ottlová, Marta. "Smetana, Bedřich". Grove Music Online, ed. Laura Macy. Archived from the original on 1 June 2013.(subscription required)
- Steen, Michael (2003). The Lives and Times of the Great Composers. London: Icon Books. ISBN 978-1-84046-679-9.
- "The historical development of Czech theatre". Ministry of Foreign Affairs of the Czech Republic. Archived from the original on 30 April 2009.
