= Chříč =

- Municipality
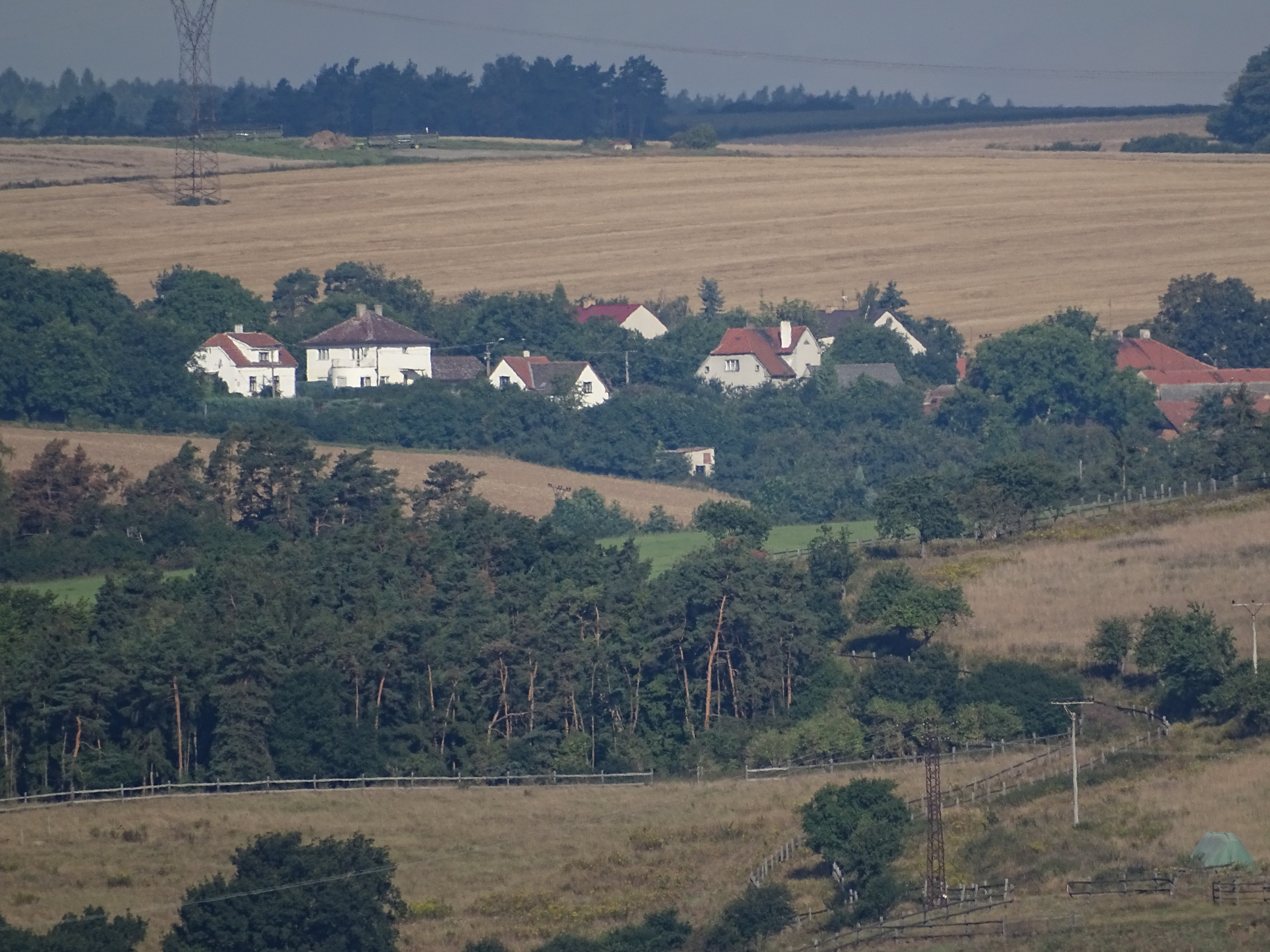
- General view of Chříč

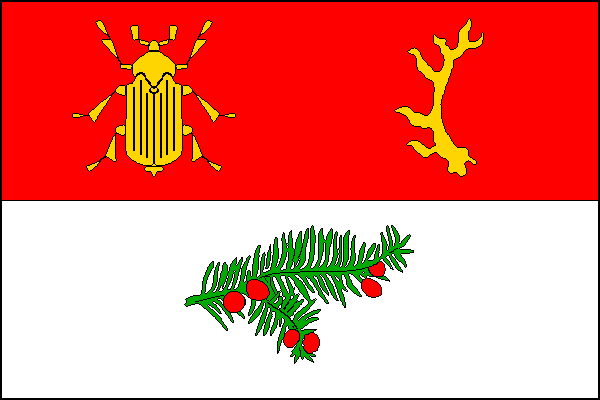
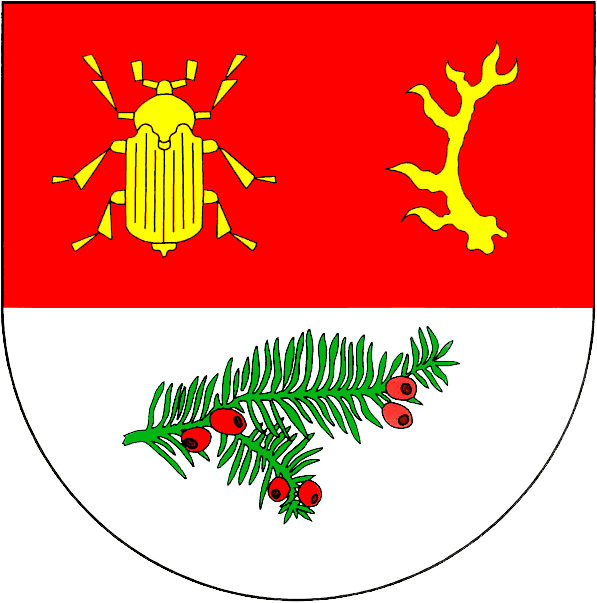
- Flag Coat of arms

- Location in the Czech Republic
- Coordinates: 49°58′19″N 13°38′45″E
- Country: Czech Republic
- Region: Plzeň
- District: Plzeň-North
- First mentioned: 1318

Area
  - Total: 13.63 km^{2} (5.26 sq mi)
- Elevation: 374 m (1,227 ft)

Population (2026-01-01)
  - Total: 239
  - Density: 17.5/km^{2} (45.4/sq mi)
- Time zone: UTC+1 (CET)
  - Summer (DST): UTC+2 (CEST)
- Postal code: 331 41
- Website: www.chric.cz

Chříč is a municipality and village in Plzeň-North District in the Plzeň Region of the Czech Republic. It has about 200 inhabitants.

Chříč lies approximately 32 kilometres (20 mi) north-east of Plzeň and 57 km (35 mi) west of Prague.

== Administrative division ==
Chříč consists of two municipal parts (in brackets population according to the 2021 census):

- Chříč (198)
- Lhota (11)

== Demographics ==
Historical population
Year	Pop.	±%
1869	690	—
1880	646	−6.4%
1890	674	+4.3%
1900	618	−8.3%
1910	614	−0.6%
1921	566	−7.8%
1930	481	−15.0%
1950	324	−32.6%
1961	308	−4.9%
1970	239	−22.4%
1980	267	+11.7%
1991	242	−9.4%
2001	225	−7.0%
2011	190	−15.6%
2021	209	+10.0%
Source: Censuses

== Notable people ==
- Milada Šubrtová (1924–2011), opera singer
