= Eduard Haken =

Czech operatic bass singer (1910–1996)

Eduard Haken

Eduard Haken (22 March 1910 – 12 January 1996 in Prague) was a Czech operatic bass who had a lengthy career at the National Theatre in Prague during the 20th century. Although he mostly performed within his own nation, Haken did appear at a number of important international music festivals and opera houses in Europe while traveling with the National Theatre. He was also active as a concert soloist and recitalist.

Haken possessed a dark and glossy voice that was agile and powerful enough to assail a wide array of parts from the dexterous bel canto repertoire to heavier dramatic roles. A fine actor with a good sense of comic timing, he also excelled in the basso buffo repertoire. His voice is preserved on numerous opera recordings made with the Supraphon record label.

== Biography ==
Born in Šklin, Ukraine to parents of Czech descent, Haken initially pursued a career as a doctor and in fact passed his medical examinations in 1932. While a student he took singing lessons with D. Levytsky in Prague. Eventually his love of music won over and he decided to abandon his medical career for a singing career.

Haken made his professional opera debut in a small role at the National Theatre in Prague in 1936, singing minor parts there for the next two years. In 1938 he became a principal singer at the Oldřich Stibor Theatre in Olomouc where he remained for three years. He returned to the National Theatre in 1941 where he remained for over the next five decades.

After his return to the National Theatre in 1941, Haken quickly became one of the most popular artists in the city. In his early years he developed a strong artistic partnership with conductor Vaclav Talich who greatly admired the young the bass. He was a much loved Kecal in The Bartered Bride. Among his chief roles at the theatre were Basilio in The Barber of Seville, Beneš in Dalibor, Daland in The Flying Dutchman, Mephistopheles in Faust, Mumlal in The Two Widows, Paloucký in The Kiss, Prince Gremin in Eugene Onegin, Ramfis in Aida, Rocco in Fidelio, Van Bett in Zar und Zimmermann, Vodník in Rusalka, Volfram Olbramovič in The Brandenburgers in Bohemia, Zechariah in Nabucco, and the title role in A Life for the Tsar. One of his last appearances at the house was in 1992 in a production of František Škroup's Columbus.

During his career Haken toured often with the National Theatre, making appearances throughout Europe. A highlight of these travels included performances of Rusalka at both the 1963 Holland Festival and the 1964 Edinburgh Festival. In 1971 he was the bass soloist in Leoš Janáček's Glagolitic Mass at the Salzburg Festival, reprising a role he had filled in the 1964 Ančerl/CzechPO recording of this Mass. In 1953 Haken was awarded the Stalin Prize for his contribution to music and was named a National Artist. For many years he was married to actress Marie Glázrová. He died in Prague in 1996 at the age of 85. He was posthumously awarded a Thalia Award shortly after his death. He is buried at the Vyšehrad cemetery.
