= Hugo Hasslo =

Swedish operatic baritone

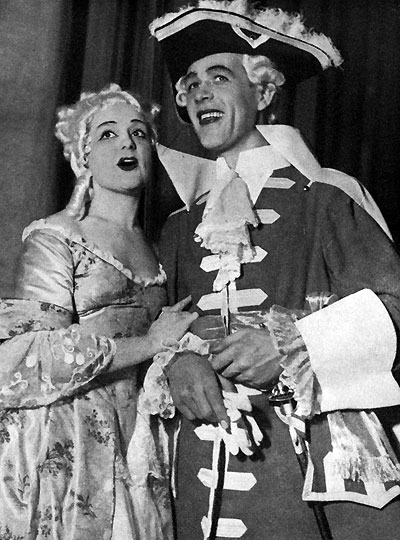
Hjördis Schymberg as Fiordiligi with Hugo Hasslo as Guglielmo in Così fan tutte

Hugo Hasslo (16 May 1911 Bohuslän - 20 January 1994 Stockholm) was a Swedish operatic baritone.

Hasslo studied in Stockholm with Hjaldis Ingebjart and Joseph Hislop and made his debut at the Royal Swedish Opera, as Guglielmo in Cosi fan tutte, in 1940, where he remained until 1964, quickly establishing himself as first baritone.

He was particularly admired in the Italian repertory singing roles such as Figaro in Il barbiere di Siviglia, Belcore in L'elisir d'amore, Malatesta in Don Pasquale, the title role in Macbeth and Rigoletto, di Luna in Il trovatore, Riccardo in Un ballo in maschera, Marcello in La boheme, etc. He also sang in Mozart and Wagner operas, and attempted the tenor role of Cavaradossi in Tosca, in 1943.

In Stockholm, he took part in the creation of Natanael Berg's Genoveva, in 1947, and in Kurt Atterberg's Der Sturm, in 1948.

He made guest appearances in Hamburg, the Royal Opera House in London, the Edinburgh Festival, the latter two in 1959.

Hasslo was also much appreciated in concert and often appeared in oratorios.

== Selected recordings ==
- 1952 - Tchaikowsky - Eugen Onegin - Hugo Hasslo, Rudolf Schock, Sena Jurinac, Gisela Litz, Gottlob Frick - Hamburg Radio Chorus and Orchestra, Wilhelm Schüchter - Cantus Classics (sung in German)
- 1953 - Verdi - Don Carlo - Aase Nordmo-Lövberg, Dagmar Herrmann, Libero de Luca, Hugo Hasslo, Josef Greindl, Hans-Herbert Fiedler - Hamburg Radio Chorus and Orchestra, Wilhelm Schüchter - Cantus Classics (sung in German)
- 1959 - Verdi - Rigoletto - Hugo Hasslo, Margareta Hallin, Nicolai Gedda, Kerstin Meyer, Arne Tyren - Royal Swedish Opera Chorus and Orchestra, Sixten Ehrling - (live recording issued on various labels)

== Sources ==
- Operissimo.com
