= Miroslav Čangalović =

Serbian opera singer

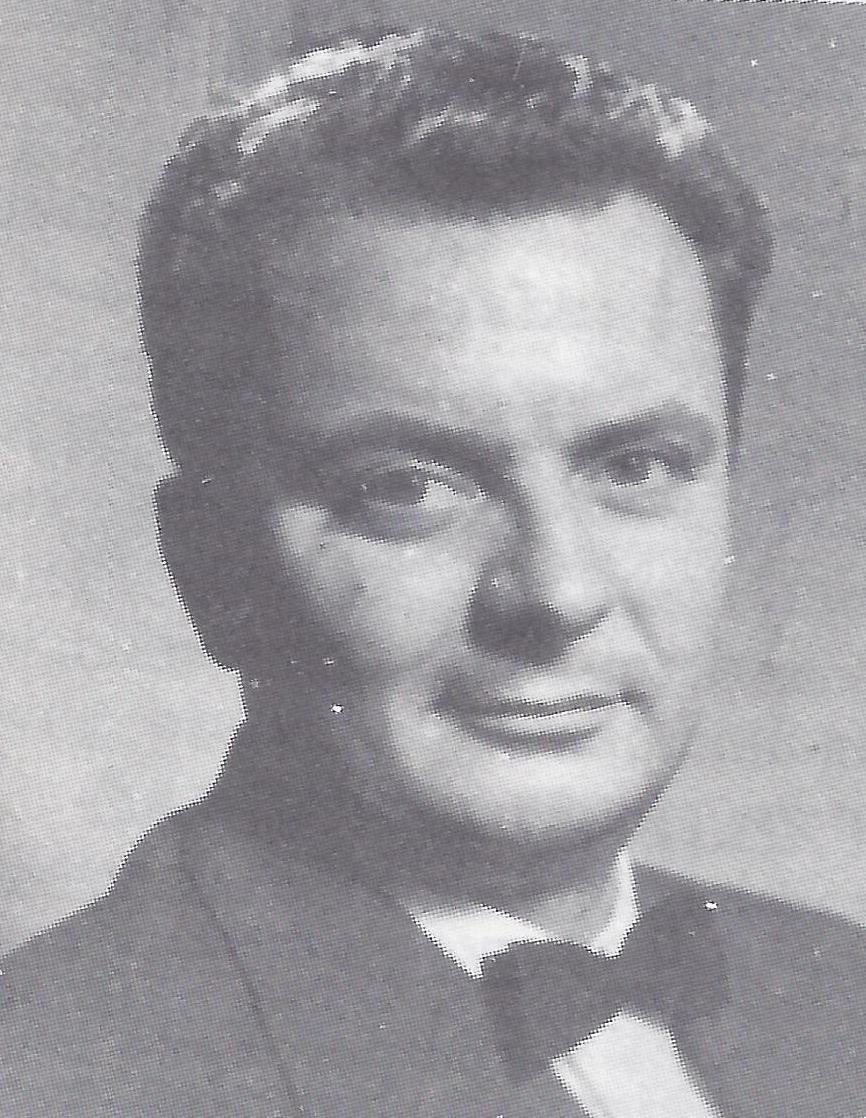
- Born: March 3, 1921; Glamoč, Kingdom of Yugoslavia
- Died: October 1, 1999 (aged 78); Belgrade, Yugoslavia
- Occupation: Opera singer

Miroslav Čangalović (Serbian Cyrillic: Мирослав Чангаловић; 3 March 1921 – 1 October 1999) was a Serbian opera and concert singer and is considered to be one of the greatest basses in Yugoslav history.

== Biography ==
Čangalović was born in the small Bosnian town of Glamoč. Due to his friendship with the family of Dušan Trbojević, a distinguished Serbian pianist and composer, he familiarized himself with the art of opera as well as operatic and concerto performing. His operatic debut took place in 1946 in Belgrade National Theater Opera House, with the role of jailer in Giacomo Puccini's opera Tosca. Between 1946 and 1954 he took singing lessons by Zdenka Zikova, a well-known operatic singer and a pedagogue.

His operatic repertoire included more than 90 roles which he interpreted with his rich voice and his dramatic strength. His most successful creation is considered to be that of Boris Godunov, from the Modest Mussorgsky's opera of the same name. Right next to it is the role of Dosifey, from the opera Khovanschina of the same composer. By many music historians and critics he is regarded as the greatest ever Boris Godunov, right after Feodor Chaliapin. His other roles include those of Don Quichotte (Massenet's Don Quichotte), Galitsky and Konchak (Borodin's Prince Igor), Mephistopheles (Gounod's Faust), Phillip The Second (Verdi's Don Carlos), Figaro (Mozart's The Marriage of Figaro), Kuchobey (Tschaikovsky's Mazeppa), Ivan The Terrible (Rimsky-Korsakov's The Maid of Pskov), Mitke (Konjović's Koštana), and others.

His concert repertoire consisted of 520 pieces that included solo songs, song-cycles, cantatas and oratorios. A great deal of these were pieces written and composed by numerous Serbian and Yugoslav composers, most of which had its premiere thanks to Čangalović. His concert career lasted more than 40 years during which he gave over 300 concerts held across former Yugoslavia as well as more than 160 worldwide.

His outstanding achievements were awarded on various occasions both at home and abroad. He was awarded twice by International Jury of Critics in France as the best singer of the season at the Festival Theatre of Nations in Paris, in 1959 (for the role of Mephistopheles) and in 1961 (for that of Boris Godunov). He was also awarded by the French government as the Chevalier de l'ordre des Arts et des Lettres, for his contribution to promoting the French culture. He died in Belgrade, Serbia, in 1999.
