= Milka Stojanović =

Serbian soprano opera singer (1937–2023)

- Милка Стојановић
- Stojanović c. 1967
- Born: 13 January 1937; Belgrade, Yugoslavia
- Died: 1 September 2023 (aged 86); Belgrade, Serbia
- Occupation: Operatic soprano
- Organizations: National Theatre in Belgrade

Milka Stojanović (Serbian: Милка Стојановић; 13 January 1937 – 1 September 2023) was a Serbian soprano opera singer who achieved international success. She sang with the National Theatre in Belgrade from 1960 and started her international career in 1962 when she appeared at the Edinburgh Festival. She performed at the Metropolitan Opera and was a guest singer at many leading opera houses worldwide. Stojanović was voted a "Golden voice", one of the four most beautiful operatic voices of the 20th century and is listed as one of the greatest performers of the Verdian repertoire in the Villa Verdi.

== Life and career ==
=== Early life and education ===
Milka Stojanović was born in Belgrade on 13 January 1937, to Ljubinka (née Vojinović) and Svetomir Stojanović. She had a sister, Zagorka Stojanović, who became a costume designer and icon-weaver, and later designed costumes for Stojanović's recitals and concert performances. Stojanović studied world literature at the University of Belgrade Faculty of Philology, where she completed the course of the studies but did not graduate. She studied singing in the opera studio of Zdenka Zikova, in the La Scala Opera School (1964) and with Zinka Milanov in New York City.

=== Operatic career ===
Stojanović debuted at the age of 22 as Amelia in Verdi's Un ballo in maschera on the stage of the Belgrade Opera in 1959. From 1960 she was a lead soprano singer of the Belgrade Opera and sang in the first Yugoslav staging of Verdi's Nabucco (as Abigaille) and Attila (as Odabella), and as Bellini's Norma.

She started her international career in 1962 when she appeared, with a production of the Belgrade Opera, at the Edinburgh Festival, followed by appearances with the company in Oslo in 1968 and in Lausanne in 1971. She performed as a guest at the Graz Opera in 1962, at the Vienna State Opera from 1970, at the Teatro Petruzzelli in Bari, the Bavarian State Opera and the Cologne Opera in 1971, and at the Liceu in Barcelona in 1971.

She made her debut at the Metropolitan Opera in 1967 as Leonora in Verdi's La forza del destino; a reviewer from Daily News noted that she "created a favourable impression", alongside Richard Tucker, Robert Merrill and Cesare Siepi, with Francesco Molinari-Pradelli conducting. She went on to sing with the company as Liù in Puccini's Turandot, Amelia in Verdi's Simon Boccanegra, Mimì in Puccini's La bohème and the title roles of Verdi's Aida and Ponchielli's La Gioconda. She performed major soprano roles opposite Mario Del Monaco, Franco Corelli, Plácido Domingo, Luciano Pavarotti, Tito Gobbi, Nicolai Gedda and Bruno Prevedi, amongst others.

Stojanović also extensively guested in the European opera houses, including the Bolshoi Theatre in Moscow, the Hamburg State Opera, Deutsche Oper Berlin, Teatro dell'Opera di Roma, and in Venice, Palermo, Prague, Madrid, Syracuse, Bucharest, Budapest and Helsinki. She also performed in Berlin State Opera, Frankfurt, Salzburg, Zurich, Copenhagen, Bologna, Valencia, Athens, Thessaloniki, Leningrad, Kiev, Odesa, Novosibirsk, Kazan, Bratislava, Ankara, Cairo, and Caracas.

Her other Verdian roles include Desdemona in Otello, Violetta in La traviata and Élisabeth de Valois in Don Carlos. She also performed as Puccini's Tosca and operas by Pietro Mascagni, in Borodin's Prince Igor, as Liza in Tchaikovsky's The Queen of Spades, Leonore in Beethoven's Fidelio, among others. Her broad repertoire also included Puccini's Madama Butterfly, the Countess in Mozart's Le nozze di figaro, the title role in Smetana's The Bartered Bride, Santuzza in Mascagnis's Cavalleria rusticana and Tatjana in Tchaikovsky's Eugene Onegin. Other performances include title role in Cilea's Adriana Lecouvreur, Leonora in Verdi's Il trovatore, La Duchesse Hélène in Verdi's Les vêpres siciliennes, Cleopatra in Giulio Cesare, Elsa von Brabant in Wagner's Lohengrin, Ludmila in Smetana's The Bartered Bride, and Kseniya in Mussorgsky's Boris Godunov. She sang solos in Verdi's Requiem and Beethoven's Missa solemnis.

Stojanović remained the prima donna of the Belgrade Opera until her retirement in 1993. Verdi's

=== Personal life ===
Her marriage to Živan Saramandić (1939–2012), a member of the Belgrade Opera and one of leading Serbian bass singers, was her second. They married in 1970 and remained together until Saramandić's death on 30 January 2012. The couple had no children. Stojanović was Serbian Orthodox.

Milka Stojanović died in Belgrade on 1 September 2023, at age 86.

== Voice ==
Stojanović's voice was a soprano with lush sonority and subtle dynamic nuances, with the levelled registers in its basic, velvety tonality. Her singing is characterized by refined interpretation and subtle musicality, paired with the exquisite vocal, technical and stylish qualities which allowed her to create performances of high emotional intensity. She was also known as a cantata singer.

Stojanović was also known for the singing of the Russian romances, which she sang with her husband, Živan Saramandić. Over the years they organized series of recitals dedicated to Feodor Chaliapin, as Saramandić was nicknamed "Serbian Chaliapin", where they would also sing Russian folk songs.

In the late 1960s, the Opera News magazine conducted the survey among the American critics and audience, who chose the four "Golden voices" of the 20th century: Stojanović, Renata Tebaldi, Beniamino Gigli and Mario Del Monaco. In Verdi's house, Villa Verdi, in the village of Sant'Agata in Italy, there is a book with the list of the greatest performers of the Verdian repertoire and Stojanović is listed in it.

== Discography ==
In 1975 she recorded an album for the Radio Television Belgrade titled U svetu opere ("in the world of opera"), which contained works by Verdi, Puccini, Giordano, Francesco Cilea, and Ponchielli. Her second album, Velike interpretacije ("great interpretations"), came in 1992 for the same publisher, with additional works by Bellini. It was re-published in 1998 as a CD.

== Accolades ==
In 1959 she won the third prize at the Yugoslav competition for young music artists in Zagreb and in 1960 she won at the singing contest for young singers in Toulouse, France. She was awarded the "Golden Lyre", the award of the Yugoslav Composers Union, City of Belgrade's October award and four memorial plaques, awards of the National Theatre, among others. A monograph on her career was co-published by the National Theatre in Belgrade in 2012.
