= Milica Babić-Jovanović =

Serbian costume designer and university professor

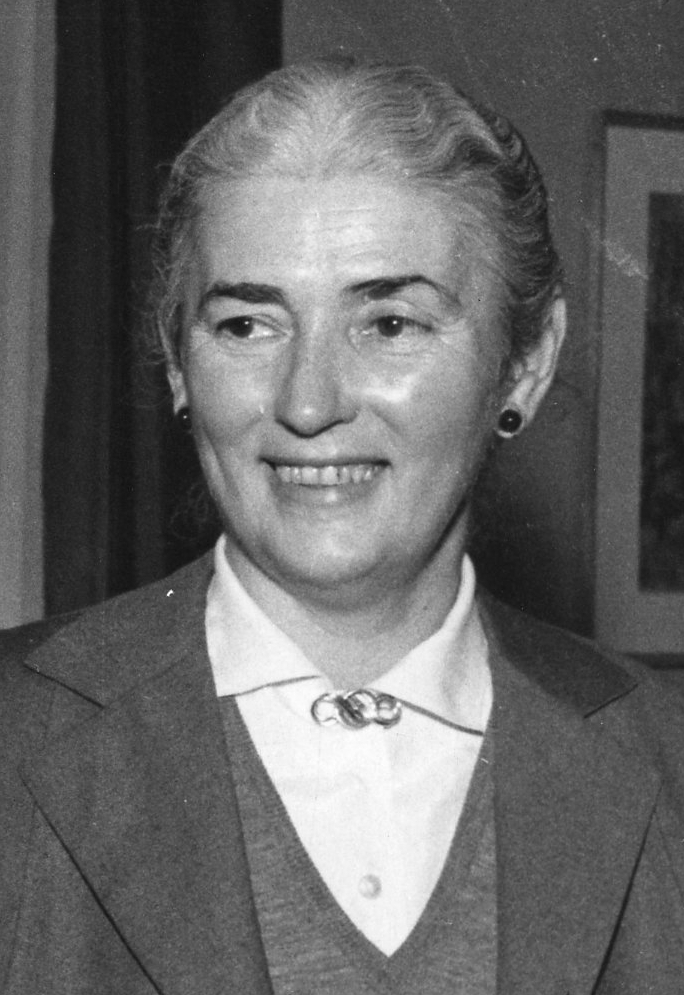
Milica Babić-Jovanović in 1961.

Milica Babić-Jovanović (September 2, 1909 – March 24, 1968) was a Serbian costume designer, known for her work with the Serbian National Theatre. She designed costumes for over 300 performances over the course of her career.

== Early life and education ==
Milica Babić was born in 1909 in Šamac, Austria-Hungary, in what is now the Republika Srpska, an entity of Bosnia and Herzegovina. Her parents were Stevan, a wealthy merchant, and Zora. She displayed a talent for visual art, and after she graduated high school her father sent her to study in Vienna. There, she spent five years as a student at the School of Applied Arts of the Austrian Museum of Art and Industry, now the Museum of Applied Arts, Vienna.

== Career ==
In 1931, she moved to Belgrade, where she became a professional costume designer for the Serbian National Theatre. She is considered Serbia's first formally trained costume designer, and a major figure in the region's costume design sphere. In her role at the theater, she collaborated with such artists as Jovan Bijelić and Vladimir Žedrinski. Babić-Jovanović also worked as a professor, becoming the first lecturer on the history of costumes and wigs at the National Theatre's acting school.

Over her three decades at the National Theatre, she designed costumes for more than 300 performances, including ballets, opera, and drama. She also worked as a costume designer for several feature films. Though she was based in Belgrade, throughout her career she traveled to work on productions across the region, including in Zagreb, Sarajevo, Skopje, Ljubljana, and Dubrovnik. The final production for which she designed costumes was the opera The Gambler by Sergei Prokofiev in 1961.

Babić-Jovanović's work is characterized by a refined style, a careful use of color, and the incorporation of traditional folk elements and ornaments.

== Personal life ==
Her first husband was the journalist and diplomat Nenad Jovanović. She moved with him to Berlin in 1939. While living there, she worked as a fashion correspondent for the Serbian newspaper Politika. During World War II, her husband spent time in the Dachau concentration camp, on false charges of being an English spy. After the war, she returned to working in the theater in Belgrade, making costumes out of sacks and parachute silk due to the postwar economic situation.

After Nenad died in 1957, she married the Nobel Prize-winning writer Ivo Andrić, with whom she had been close long before her first husband's death. The two met through Nenad and had become close friends in Berlin, where Andrić had also been stationed nearly two decades earlier. Her second marriage lasted from 1958 until her death.

Babić-Jovanović died of a heart attack in 1968, in Herceg Novi. She is buried in Belgrade New Cemetery's Alley of Distinguished Citizens.
