= Mariella Adani =

Italian classical soprano (born 1934)

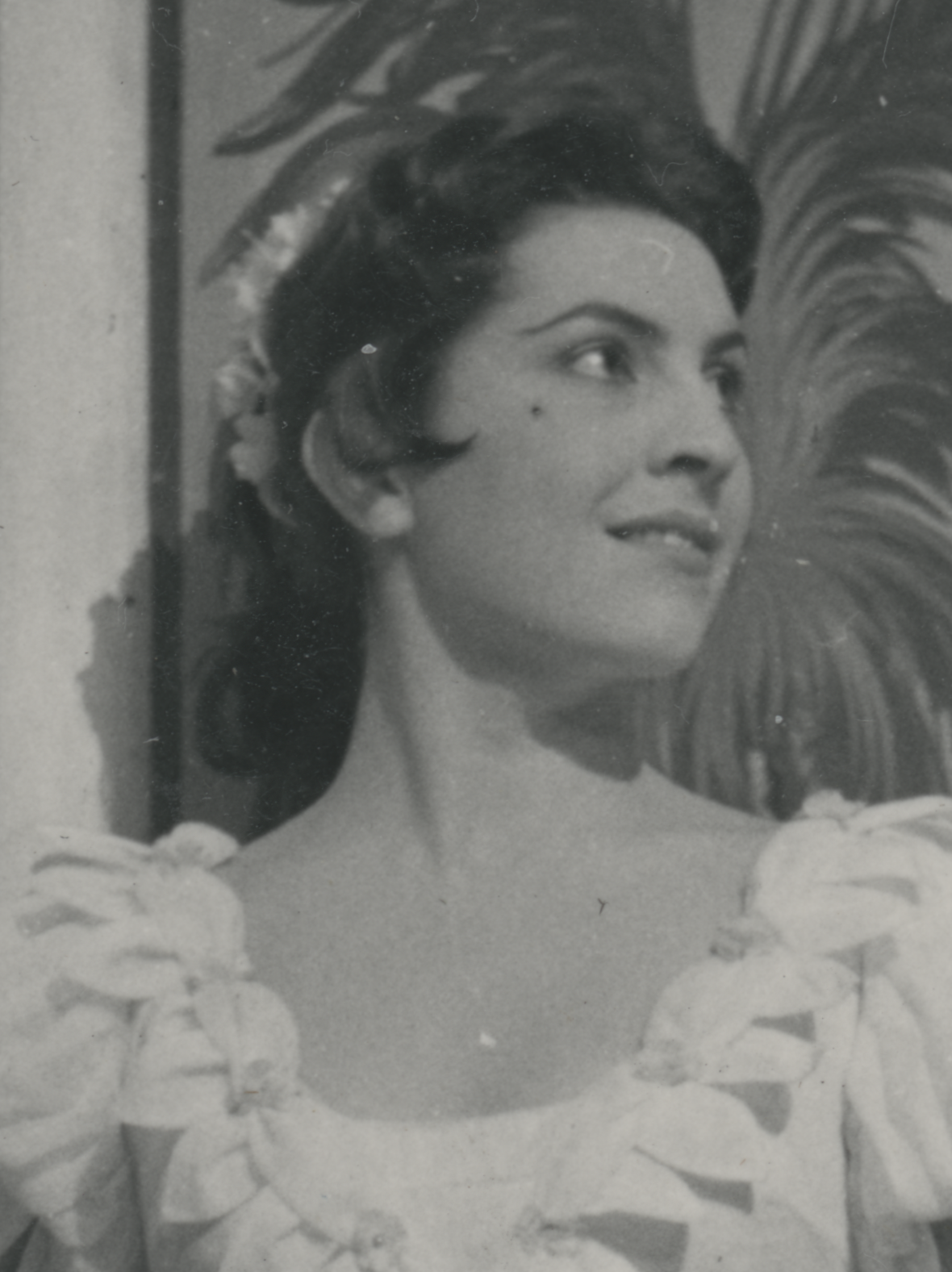
- Mariella Adani in Il Signor Bruschino, Teatro alla Scala, Milan
- Born: Laura Adani; December 17, 1934 (age 91); Palanzano, Parma, Kingdom of Italy
- Education: Parma Conservatory
- Occupations: Operatic soprano; singing teacher
- Years active: 1950s–1980s

Laura "Mariella" Adani (born December 17, 1934) is an Italian classical soprano who had an active career in operas, concerts, and recitals from the 1950s through the 1980s. She has sung under the musical direction of Vittorio Gui, Carlo Maria Giulini, Nino Sanzogno, Oliviero De Fabritiis, and Peter Maag, and under the directors Sandro Bolchi, Franco Zeffirelli, Luchino Visconti, and Walter Felsenstein. A light lyric soprano, she has particularly excelled in the operas of Wolfgang Amadeus Mozart and Gioachino Rossini. She has also been admired for her performances in Baroque opera. Retired from the stage, she now devotes her time to teaching singing.

== Biography ==
Mariella Adani as Susanna in Le nozze di Figaro

Mariella Adani in Il Signor Bruschino, Teatro alla Scala, 1956-1957.

Adani was born in Palanzano. She studied voice at the Parma Conservatory with Ettore Campogalliani and at the L'Accademia di La Scala with Giulio Confalonieri. In 1954 she made her professional opera debut at La Scala as Barbarina in Le nozze di Figaro with Elisabeth Schwarzkopf as the Countess, Irmgard Seefried as Susanna, Mario Petri as the Count, and Rolando Panerai as Figaro. She returned frequently to that house through 1962, singing such roles as Gretel in Hänsel und Gretel, Amore in Christoph Willibald Gluck's Orfeo ed Euridice, Nannetta in Giuseppe Verdi's Falstaff, Lucieta in Ermanno Wolf-Ferrari's I quatro rusteghi, and Musetta in Giacomo Puccini's La bohème. She also portrayed the title role in the Italian premiere of Leoš Janáčeks' The Cunning Little Vixen at La Scala in 1958.

In 1956 Adani made her first appearance at La Fenice as Elena in Nino Rota's Il cappello di paglia di Firenze. She returned there periodically through 1968 in such roles as Anna in Die Jahreszeiten, Norina in Don Pasquale, and Zerlina in Don Giovanni. In 1957 she married bass Giorgio Tadeo, with whom she has two children. That same year she made her debut at the Teatro della Piccola Scala as Sofia in Riccardo Malipiero's La donna è mobile. She returned to that house often through 1973, portraying such roles as Arminda in La finta giardiniera, Bellina in Le astuzie femminili, Fanny in Gioachino Rossini's La cambiale di matrimonio, Paoluccia in La buona figliuola, and the title heroine in Gaetano Donizetti's Rita among other roles.

During the 1960s, 1970s, and into the 1980s Adani was active at many of the major opera houses in Italy. She was often found at the Teatro di San Carlo, where she appeared as late as 1983 as Donizetti's Rita. She also was a repeat performer at the Teatro Regio di Torino, the Teatro Massimo, the Teatro Lirico Giuseppe Verdi, and the Teatro Comunale di Bologna. At the latter house she had a particular triumph as Fiorilla in Rossini's Il turco in Italia in 1966. She also made a number of appearances at the Maggio Musicale Fiorentino and at the opera festival at the Baths of Caracalla in Rome.

Adani was also highly active as a freelance artist on the international stage. She appeared almost every year at the Aix-en-Provence Festival between 1957 and 1967, where she was a lauded Mozart interpreter. Some of her portrayals at that festival included Despina in Così fan tutte, Papagena in The Magic Flute, Susanna in Le Nozze di Figaro, and Zerlina. She made her debut at the Holland Festival as Flamina in Haydn's Il mondo della luna in 1959. That same year she made her first appearance at the Wexford Festival Opera as Ninetta in Rossini's La gazza ladra.

In 1960 Adani portrayed both Nannetta and Susanna at the Glyndebourne Festival. She made her debut at the Vienna State Opera that year as Susanna. In 1961 she made her debut at the Opéra de Monte-Carlo in the world premiere of Bruno Gillet's Il visconte dimezzato. She also made guest appearances at the Bavarian State Opera, the Hamburg State Opera, the Deutsche Oper Berlin, the Lyric Opera of Chicago, the Teatro Colón, De Nederlandse Opera, the Opéra National de Paris, the Liceu, the Romanian National Opera, the Teatro Nacional de São Carlos, the Palacio de Bellas Artes, and at the opera houses in Cologne and Wiesbaden.

== Discography ==
- Don Giovanni, Orchestre de la Société des Concerts du Conservatoire, 1960 (Zerlina)
- 1960 Club Français Du Disque (Serpina)
- Ermanno Wolf-Ferrari's I quatro rusteghi, Orchestra di Teatro Communale di Torino, 1969. (Lucieta)
- La Bohème, Rome Opera Orchestra and Chorus, Thomas Schippers, 1963, as Musetta
