= Antonín Švorc =

Czech opera singer (1934–2011)

- Born: 12 February 1934; Jaroměř, Czecheslovakia
- Died: 21 February 2011 (aged 77)
- Occupations: Opera singer (bass-baritone); educator

Antonín Švorc (12 February 1934, in Jaroměř – 21 February 2011) was a Czech operatic bass-baritone. He studied with J. Berlíka at the Prague Conservatory before making his professional opera debut at the Liberec Theatre in 1955 where he was committed for one year. He joined the roster of principal artists at the National Theatre in Prague in 1956. He performed at that theatre until 1962 when he joined the Prague State Opera (PSO) where he performed for the next several decades. In 1985 he was named a People's Artist of Czechoslovakia and in 2003 he was honored with a Thalia Award. Retired from the stage, he taught on the voice faculty at the Prague Conservatory.

Among the many roles Švorc created on stage are Adolf in Antonín Dvořák's The Jacobin, Alfio in Pietro Mascagni's Cavalleria rusticana, Amonasro in Giuseppe Verdi's Aida, Barak in Richard Strauss's Die Frau ohne Schatten, Budivoj and Vladislav in Bedřich Smetana's Dalibor, Donner in Richard Wagner's Das Rheingold, Escamillo in Georges Bizet's Carmen, Hans Sachs in Wagner's Die Meistersinger von Nürnberg, Iago in Verdi's Otello, Ismen in Dvořák's Armida, Jochanaan in Strauss's Salome, Kaspar in Carl Maria von Weber's Der Freischütz, Kurwenal in Wagner's Tristan und Isolde, Pizarro in Ludwig van Beethoven's Fidelio, Přemysl in Zdeněk Fibich's Šárka, Přemysl, Chrudoš, and Radovan in Smetana's Libuše, Scarpia in Giacomo Puccini's Tosca, Telramund in Wagner's Lohengrin, Tomeš in Smetana's The Kiss, Wotan in Wagner's Der Ring des Nibelungen, and the title roles in Modest Mussorgsky's Boris Godunov, Wagner's The Flying Dutchman, Verdi's Nabucco, Alexander Borodin's Prince Igor, and Verdi's Simon Boccanegra.

== Sources ==
- Biography of Antonín Švorc at archive of National Theatre (in Czech)
- Biography of Antonín Švorc at www.prgcons.cz (in Czech)
- Biography of Antonín Švorc at operasingers.sweb.cz (in Czech)
- Antonín Švorc died at 77 (in Czech)
