= Sylvia Kodetová =

Czech opera singer and music educator (1930–2018)

- Born: 21 May 1930; Žatec, Czechoslovakia
- Died: 31 July 2018 (aged 88); Brno, Czech Republic
- Occupation(s): Opera singer, music educator
- Known for: Leading soloist at Brno and Prague Opera

Sylvia Kodetová (21 May 1930 – 31 July 2018) was a Czech opera singer and music educator. She was recognized as one of the leading lyric sopranos of her generation in Czechoslovakia, performing with major opera houses and contributing significantly to music education in the country.

== Biography ==
Sylvia Kodetová was born on 21 May 1930 in Žatec, Czechoslovakia. She developed an early interest in music and pursued formal studies in singing. Kodetová became a prominent figure in Czech opera, performing as a leading soloist at both the Brno and Prague Opera houses.

Her repertoire included major roles in operas by Czech composers such as Leoš Janáček, as well as international works. Kodetová was noted for her interpretations in productions of Káťa Kabanová, Příhody lišky Bystroušky (The Cunning Little Vixen), and Věc Makropulos (The Makropulos Affair), among others.

In addition to her stage career, Kodetová was active as a music educator, mentoring a new generation of singers and contributing to the cultural life of Brno and the Czech Republic.

Sylvia Kodetová died on 31 July 2018 in Brno, Czech Republic, at the age of 88.

== See also ==
- National Theatre Brno
- List of Czech musicians
