= Tugomir Franc =

Yugoslavian opera singer (1932–1983)

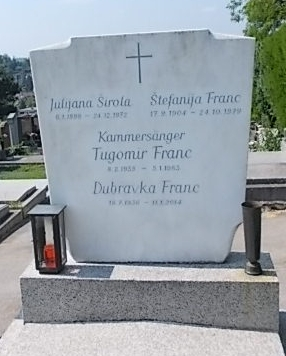
Tugomir Franc's tombstone

Tugomir Franc (8 February 1932 – 5 January 1983), was a Yugoslavian opera singer (bass).

== Life ==
Born in Zagreb, Kingdom of Yugoslavia, Franc was trained at the Zagreb Conservatory by Zlatko Sir and Lav Vrbanik and then in Vienna by Elisabeth Radó. From the end of the 1950s he sang frequently at the Vienna State Opera and at the Bayreuth Festival, among others under the direction of Herbert von Karajan (as Titurel in Parsifal in 1961, and in Tannhäuser in 1963). From 1964 to 1965 he also sang at the Salzburg Festival. As a guest he was active in Bordeaux, Nancy, Toulouse, Rome, Turin, Frankfurt am Main, Stockholm, Geneva, Belgrade and Zagreb as well as at the Vienna Volksoper.

Franc had a warm, deep voice and clear diction, despite a slight Balkan accent. He was also successful as a concert and oratorio singer.

He is buried at Sieveringer Friedhof (2-15-5) in Vienna.
