= The Brandenburgers in Bohemia =

Opera by Bedřich Smetana

- Opera by Bedřich Smetana
- Sheet music
- Native title: Braniboři v Čechách
- Librettist: Karel Sabina
- Language: Czech
- Premiere: 5 January 1866; Provisional Theatre, Prague

The Brandenburgers in Bohemia (Czech: Braniboři v Čechách) is a three-act opera, the first by Bedřich Smetana. The Czech libretto was written by Karel Sabina, and is based on events from Czech history. The work was composed in the years 1862–1863. Smetana and Sabina wrote the opera at a time of great Czech patriotism, with the pending opening of a new theatre for production of Czech operas in Prague.

The opera received its first performance at the Provisional Theatre (or the "Interim Theatre"), Prague, on 5 January 1866, and the first performance was a success. The first UK performances were in April 1978 by Hammersmith Municipal Opera. The first professional production in the UK, conducted by Vilém Tauský, was not until 1994.

== Roles ==
Roles, voice types, premiere cast
Role	Voice type	Premiere cast, 5 January 1866 Conductor: Bedřich Smetana
Volfram Olbramovič, Lord Mayor of Prague	bass	František Hynek
Oldřich Rokycanský, a knight	baritone	Petr Doubravský
Junoš, young resident of Prague	tenor	Jindřich Polák
Jan Tausendmark, young resident of Prague	baritone	Josef Lev
Varneman, captain of the Brandenburgers	tenor	Jan Ludvík Lukes
Jíra, a runaway serf	tenor	Arnošt Grand
Ludiše, Volfram's daughter	soprano	Isabella Ferenczyová
Vlčenka, Volfram's daughter	soprano	Josefína-Marie Schmidtová-Procházková
Děčana, Volfram's daughter	contralto	Marie Pisařovicová
Old villager	bass	Josef Paleček
Town crier	baritone	Josef Čapek
Knights and soldiers, Olbramovič's men, villagers, Brandenburger soldiers, vagabonds and beggars, Judges

== Synopsis ==
Place: Prague
Time: the 13th century, during the occupation of Bohemia by forces of the Margraviate of Brandenburg.

Upon the death of King Ottokar II in 1278 Battle on the Marchfeld, his widow Kunigunda had called in the Brandenburgian troops to lend aid against the army of victorious Rudolf of Habsburg. Rudolf retired to Austria, nevertheless the Brandenburgers soon acted like occupants: they arrested Kunigunda and her seven-year-old son Wenceslaus at Bezděz Castle and agreed with Rudolf that they would retain the Bohemian rule for the next five years.

The Prague people led by mayor Volfram Olbramovič suffer from the Brandenburg occupation. The citizen Junoš reports on plundering and looting by Brandenburgian troops. Ludiše, the mayor's daughter, rejects the approaches made by the German townsman Jan Tausendmark, who thereupon joins the occupants. The serf Jíra is designated the leader of a rebel movement. He openly charges Tausendmark with the kidnapping of the mayor's three daughters, Ludiše, Vlčenka and Děčana. To avoid clashes of arms, Olbramovič has Jíra arrested. The mayor's daughters are kept by Brandenburg troops, and Olbramovič asks Tausendmark to arrange for their liberation. However, the Brandenburg captain Varnemann demands a high ransom. Meanwhile, Jíra is put on trial and condemned to death. However, it is Junoš, in love with Ludiše, who manages to save Jíra. Tausendmark, who intends to abduct Ludiše, fails to reach an agreement with Varnemann. He and the Brandenburgers are driven out of Prague, and the city is liberated.

== Political background ==
While taking place in a distant historical time, the opera presents heroic Czechs struggling to shake off the oppressive rule of German-speaking occupiers – a theme obviously attractive to a Nationalist Czech audience. However, the opera's villains are not the Habsburg Austrians who actually ruled Bohemia at the time when the opera was written and performed. Rather, they are from Brandenburg – the lineal ancestor of Prussia, Austria's main rival; In January 1866, when the opera was presented, tensions between Austria and Prussia were at their peak, and a few months later would culminate in the Austro-Prussian War. Thus, Austrian censors had no strong reason to object to an opera presenting Brandenburgers as villains.

== Recordings ==
- 1963, Jan Hus Tichý (conductor), Chorus and Orchestra of the Prague National Theatre; Karel Kalaš, Jiří Joran, Ivo Žídek, Zdeněk Otava, Antonín Votava, Bohumil Vich, Milada Šubrtová, Miroslava Fidlerová, Věra Soukupová, Eduard Haken, Jindřich Jindrák
