= Naděžda Kniplová =

Czech opera singer (1932–2020)

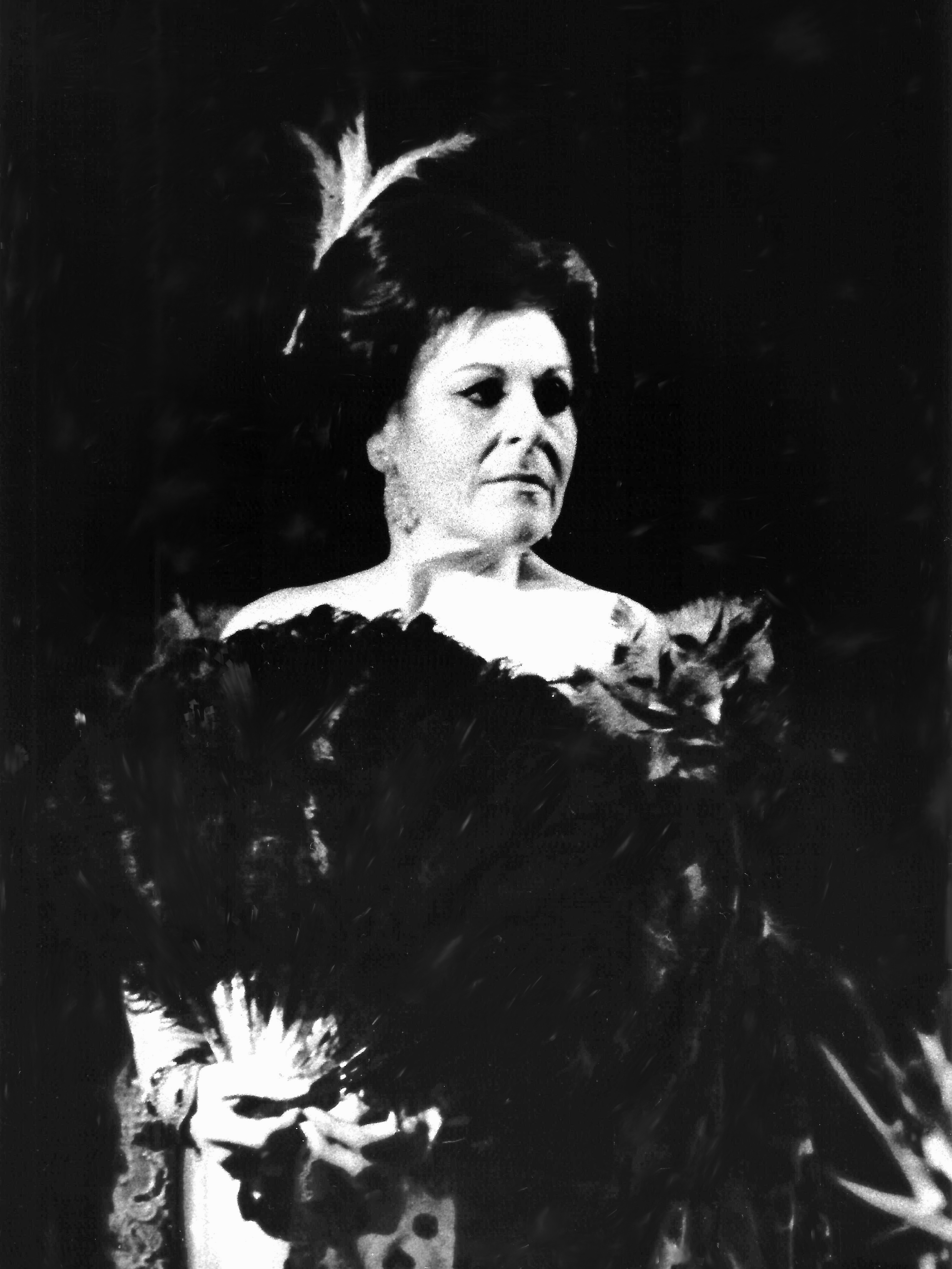
- As Foreign Princess in Rusalka, 1987
- Born: Naděžda Pokorná; 18 April 1932; Ostrava
- Died: 14 January 2020 (aged 87)
- Education: Prague Conservatory; Academy of Performing Arts in Prague
- Occupations: Operatic soprano; Academic voice teacher
- Organizations: National Theatre Brno; Prague National Theatre; Academy of Performing Arts in Prague

Naděžda Kniplová (née Pokorná; 18 April 1932 – 14 January 2020) was a Czech operatic soprano who had an active international career from the 1950s through the 1980s. Kniplová possessed a large voice with a sonorous, metallic, dark timbre that was particularly well suited to the dramatic soprano repertoire. While she was most admired in Czech operas and as Wagnerian heroines, she sang a wide repertoire that also encompassed Italian, Russian, and Hungarian language roles. A fine actress, her performances were praised for their intensity and pathos. However, some critics commented on a certain lack of steadiness or purity in her singing. Her voice is preserved on a number of recordings made on the Supraphon and Decca labels.

== Biography ==
Born in Ostrava to a musical family, Kniplová had her first vocal training from her father before studying under Jarmila Vavrdová at the Prague Conservatory from 1947 to 1953. She pursued further studies at the Academy of Performing Arts in Prague from 1954 to 1958 where her principal teachers were Zdeněk Otava and K. Ungrová. She made her professional opera debut at the opera house in Ústí nad Labem in the title role of Smetana's Libuše in 1957. In 1958 she won the Geneva International Singing Competition.

Kniplová joined the roster of principal singers at the Mahen Theatre in Brno in 1959, remaining with the company through 1964. During her tenure there the opera company moved to a new building, the Janáček Theatre in 1961. Among the roles she performed there were Emilia Marty in Janáček's The Makropulos Affair, Judith in Bartók's Bluebeard's Castle, Katerina in Martinů's The Greek Passion, Kostelnička Buryjovka in Janáček's Jenůfa, Renata in Prokofiev's The Fiery Angel, and the title heroines Libuše and Shostakovich's Lady Macbeth of the Mtsensk District. During that period, she also appeared as a guest at the Semperoper in Dresden, where she drew particular acclaim for the title role in Verdi's Aida.

In 1965 Kniplová became a principal soprano at the Prague National Theatre (PNT), where her first role was Ortrud in Wagner's Lohengrin. The PNT remained her principal home for more than two decades. She expanded her repertoire by Anežka in The Two Widows, Brünnhilde in Wagner's Der Ring des Nibelungen, Eva in Die Meistersinger von Nürnberg, Isolde in Tristan und Isolde, Kundry in Parsifal, Lady Macbeth in Verdi's Macbeth, Leonora in Beethoven's Fidelio, Milada in Smetana's Dalibor, Senta in Wagner's Der fliegende Holländer, and the title roles in Janáček's Káťa Kabanová, Fibich's Šárka, and Puccini's Tosca and Turandot.

While committed to the PNT, Kniplová was also highly active as a guest artist at international opera stages. In 1965 she appeared at the Berlin State Opera and traveled with that house for performances in Tokyo. In 1966 she gave lauded performances at the Badisches Staatstheater Karlsruhe, Deutsche Oper Berlin and the Hamburg State Opera. She had a major success in 1967 as Brünnhilde in the Ring cycle at the Salzburg Easter Festival conducted by Herbert von Karajan. In 1971 she appeared at the Salzburg Festival as the soprano soloist in the Janáček's Glagolitic Mass. She appeared as Isolde at the Liceu, as Brünnhilde at the Teatro Regio di Torino and the San Francisco Opera, as Isolde and Kostelnička at the Vienna State Opera, also at the Deutsche Oper am Rhein, the Palacio de Bellas Artes, the Grand Théâtre de Genève, and the Canadian Opera Company.

Retired from the stage, Kniplová served on the voice faculty at the Academy of Performing Arts in Prague. Among her notable pupils was mezzo-soprano Andrea Kalivodová. Kniplová was selected for the lifetime achievement award in opera at the 2010 Thalia Awards, however she refused the award stating that she should have received it sooner.
