= Milada Šubrtová =

Czech operatic soprano (1924–2011)

Milada Šubrtová (24 May 1924 – 1 August 2011) was a Czech operatic soprano who had a lengthy career at the National Theatre in Prague from 1948 through 1991. She was part of an instrumental group of post-World War II Czech opera singers that was responsible for popularizing Czech opera internationally. She drew particular acclaim for her portrayals of the title heroines in Leoš Janáček's Jenůfa and Antonín Dvořák's Rusalka. Her voice is preserved on a few complete opera recordings made on the Supraphon label. In 1998 she was honored with a Thalia Award.

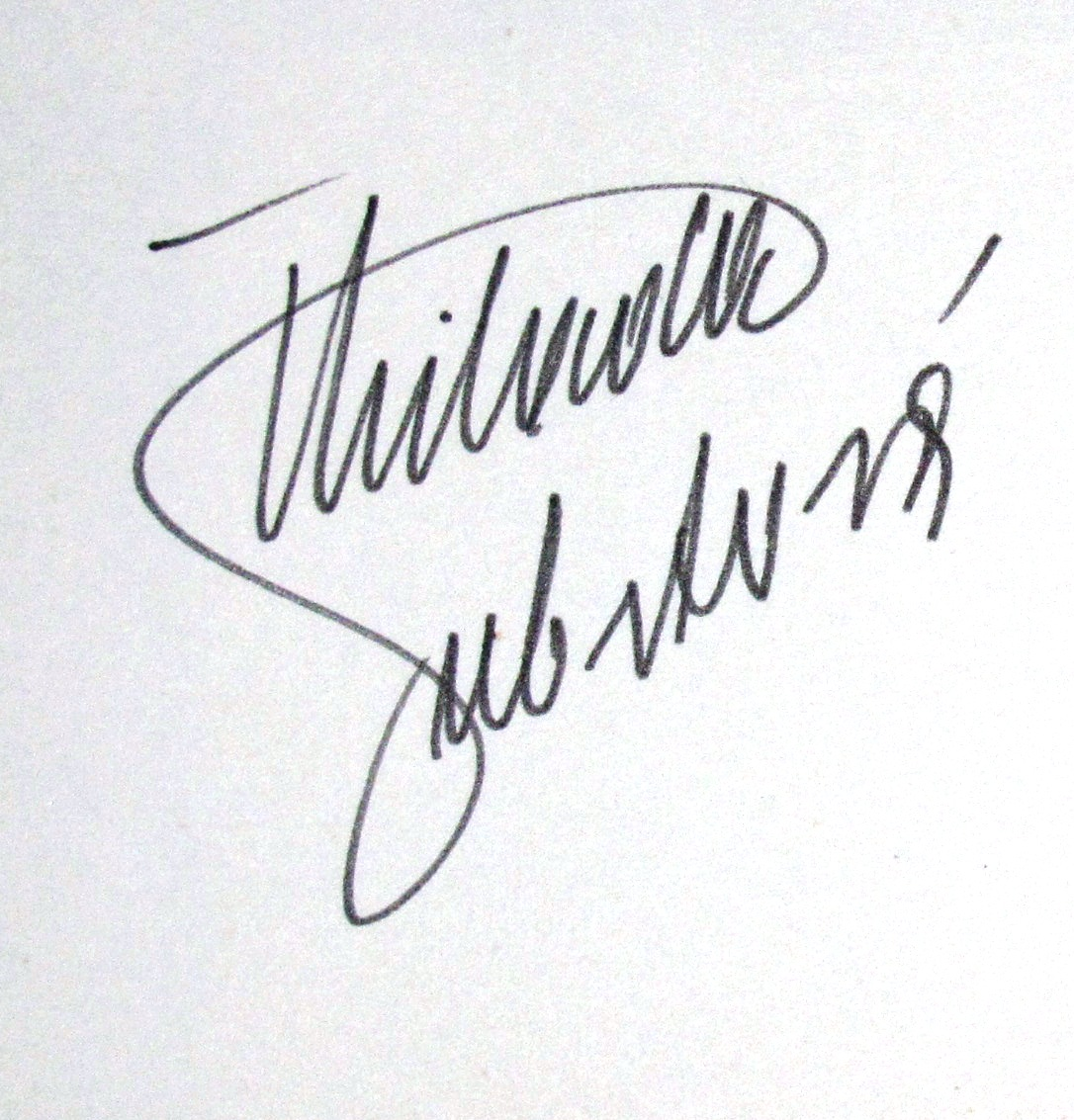
Signature of Milada Šubrtová (1983)

== Biography ==
Born in Lhota, Šubrtová moved to Prague and studied singing with Zdeněk Knittl, while working as a secretary in the civil service. She made her professional opera debut in 1946 as Giulietta in Jacques Offenbach's The Tales of Hoffmann at the "Grand Opera of 5th May". She became a principal artist at the Prague National Theatre in 1948 where she was committed for the rest of her career until her retirement in 1991.

Having made her debut at Moscow's Bolshoi Theater as the title role of Rusalka in 1953, she sang at the Berlin State Opera House in 1956 and Teatro la Fenice di Venezia in 1958. She sang the part of Milada in Smetana's Dalibor and the title role in Rusalka at the Edinburgh Festival in 1964. But she sang mainly at the Prague National Theatre, where she enjoyed exceptional popularity and the affection of her audiences. She married Czech conductor Jan Hus Tichý and sang under his conducting frequently.

Thanks to her all-round abilities she was the leading soprano there for more than 20 years. In 1954 she was awarded the Emmy Destinn and Karel Burian prize at the singing competition of the International Prague Spring Festival at which she performed arias including "Depuis le jour" from Charpentier’s Louise. Her secure technique enabled her to interpret both light coloratura roles as well as dramatic parts. Her vast repertory included more than 80 roles such as Abigaile in Nabucco, both Agathe and Ännchen in Der Freischütz, Cio-Cio-San in Madama Butterfly, Donna Anna in Don Giovanni, Elisabetta in Don Carlos, Elsa in Lohengrin, Fiordiligi in Così fan tutte, Gilda in Rigoletto, Konstanze in Die Entführung aus dem Serail, Lady Macbeth in Macbeth, Leonora in Il trovatore, Lisa in The Queen of Spades, Lyudmila in Ruslan and Lyudmila, Marguerite in Faust, Micaëla in Carmen, both Mimì and Musetta in La bohème, Pamina in The Magic Flute, Santuzza in Cavalleria rusticana, Sieglinde in Die Walküre, Tatyana in Eugene Onegin, Violetta in La traviata, and the title roles in Louise, Tosca, and Turandot. But above all, she excelled in portraying roles from Czech operas by Smetana, Dvořák and Janáček including the title roles of Libuše, Rusalka and Jenůfa, Mařenka in Prodaná nevěsta (The Bartered Bride) and Emilia Marty in Věc Makropulos (Makropulos Case).

She gave also performances in a number of operettas by Strauss, Lehár, Zeller, and in particular, Offenbach. Her concert repertoire included works from Bach to Britten and Honegger to Orff. She left just a handful recordings for the Czech record label Supraphon, but the complete recording of Rusalka has set a standard because of the glorious conducting by Zdeněk Chalabala and Šubrtová's unequalled interpretation in the title role.

== Discography of complete opera recordings ==
Record label	Composer	Work title	Part	Conductor	Recording year
Supraphon	Leoš Janáček	Jenůfa	Jano	Jaroslav Vogel	1952
Multisonic	Antonín Dvořák	Armida	Armida	Václav Jiráček	1956
Supraphon	Bedřich Smetana	Čertova stěna (The Devil's Wall)	Hedvika	Zdeněk Chalabala	1960
Supraphon	Antonín Dvořák	Rusalka	Rusalka	Zdeněk Chalabala	1961
Supraphon	Bedřich Smetana	Braniboři v Čechách (The Brandenburgers in Bohemia)	Ludiše	Jan Hus Tichý	1963
Supraphon	Bedřich Smetana	Libuše	Krasava	Jaroslav Krombholc	1965
