= Kerstin Meyer =

Swedish opera singer (1928–2020)

Kerstin Meyer CBE
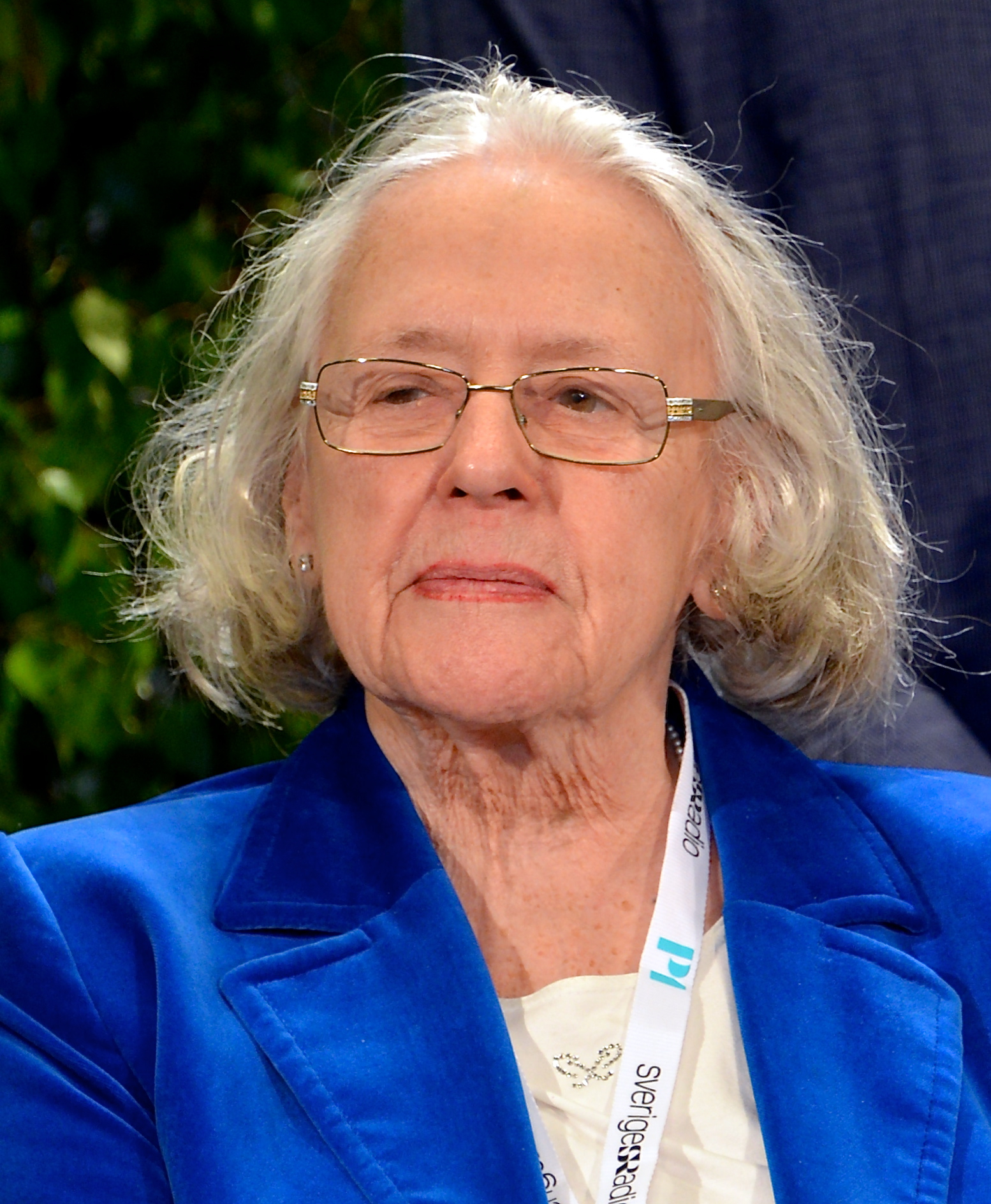
- Kerstin Meyer in 2013
- Born: Kerstin Margareta Meyer; 3 April 1928; Stockholm, Sweden
- Died: 14 April 2020 (aged 92)
- Education: Royal College of Music; Mozarteum
- Occupations: Operatic mezzo-soprano; Rector
- Organizations: Royal Swedish Opera; University College of Opera, Stockholm
- Awards: Hovsångerska; Litteris et Artibus; Illis quorum

Kerstin Margareta Meyer, CBE (3 April 1928 – 14 April 2020) was a Swedish mezzo-soprano who enjoyed an international career in opera and concert. A long-time member of the Royal Swedish Opera and Hamburg State Opera, she appeared regularly at the Royal Opera House in London and international opera houses and festivals, including in world premieres such as Alexander Goehr's Arden Must Die and György Ligeti's Le Grand Macabre.

== Early life ==
Meyer was born in Stockholm. An only child, both her father and grandfather were musicians; her grandfather was from Poland and played in symphony orchestras. After arriving in Sweden he also had a music shop and gave instrumental lessons. Her father played the trumpet and toured with his father's orchestra around Europe, and later settled to making violins in his own shop. Although she started to play the piano at six, she always wanted to become a singer.

She graduated from the Royal College of Music, Stockholm, in 1948 and was a student at the Opera School from 1950 to 1952. She studied with Adelaide von Skilondz, at the Salzburg Mozarteum, and in Siena, having won the Christine Nilsson Scholarship for studies in Salzburg and Italy, in Rome, and Vienna. During the early 1950s, along with Busk Margit Jonsson and Daisy Schörling she formed the three-woman vocal group the 'Melody Girls', which made several recordings.

== Career ==
Her debut was at the Royal Swedish Opera in 1952 as Azucena in Verdi's Il trovatore, with Set Svanholm, 34 years her senior, playing her son Manrico, followed soon by the title role of Bizet's Carmen, in a brand new “starkly realistic” production at the house, in Swedish, which used the original dialogue for the first time in Sweden and where Meyer played a major role in its huge success. This was a breakthrough as she was noticed by Wieland Wagner who engaged her for his Carmen production and brought her invitations from around the world, including the Metropolitan Opera. Meyer left Stockholm shortly after both her parents had been killed in a road traffic accident in 1961, but she eventually returned at the end of the 1960s.

Engaged at the Royal Opera from 1952 to 1962, and again from 1969, she performed more Verdi roles – Maddalena in Rigoletto, Ulrica in Un ballo in maschera, Eboli in Don Carlo, and Amneris in Aida –, Dalila in Samson et Dalila, and the Wagner roles Fricka, Erda and Waltraute in Der Ring des Nibelungen and Brangäne in Tristan und Isolde, the latter two at Bayreuth in the early 1960s. Her first appearances abroad were at the 1956 Wiesbaden Festival as a member of the Swedish Royal Opera. She appeared in several Swedish premieres, including as Didon in Les Troyens by Berlioz in 1958, Baba the Turk in Stravinsky's The Rake's Progress in 1961 in a production staged by Ingmar Bergman, and Geschwitz in Alban Berg's Lulu in 1977. She also took part in both visits of the Royal Opera Stockholm to the Edinburgh Festival.

Meyer was a member of the ensemble of the Hamburg State Opera from 1958 to 1960 and 1964 to 1969. At the instigation of its director Rolf Liebermann she moved more into modern repertory, which was not as she had intended, expecting she would sing more Strauss parts. Nonetheless, she found that modern works gave her opportunities to act distinct from the typical contralto or mezzo roles, "usually witches or princesses or gypsies or boys, roles where you never get the man!" As well as appearing as Carmen in the production staged by Wieland Wagner and conducted by Sawallisch in 1959, she created in Hamburg the roles of Mrs. Claiborne in Gunther Schuller's Die Heimsuchung (The Visitation) in 1966, Alice Arden in Alexander Goehr's Arden Must Die in 1967, and Gertrude in Humphrey Searle's Hamlet in 1968. One of her most important roles was Gluck's Orfeo which she sang in three consecutive Stockholm Festivals at Drottningholm, and at the 1959 Vancouver Festival. She also sang Dorabella opposite Elisabeth Söderström as Fiordiligi there. She was engaged in the 1959/60 season at both La Scala in Milan and as Carmen at the Metropolitan Opera, after performances as Eboli, conducted by Herbert von Karajan, and Ulrica at the Vienna State Opera the previous May.

In 1960, Meyer made her debut at the Royal Opera House in London as Didon in Les Troyens, alongside Jon Vickers and Josephine Veasey, and the same year as Ulrica and as Bradamante in Alcina during a short residency by the Stockholm company. There she performed the title role of Der Rosenkavalier by Richard Strauss and Klytemnestra in Elektra in 1975 and 1976. In György Ligeti's Le Grand Macabre, she created the roles of Amando and Spermando in 1978.

Her career also included regular visits to other major opera houses of Europe and the U.S. and a number of concert tours to Australia, the Far East, and the Americas. She appeared in the title role of Gottfried von Einem's Der Besuch der alten Dame at Glyndebourne in the British premiere in 1974, and also in the German premiere at the Bavarian State Opera in 1975. Early in her career Meyer had realized her vocation; "I was supposed to give these people [the audience] pleasure, so that made me realise what my job was. And I knew then, as I now know, that my work was taxing but stimulating and full, yes, full of joy."

Meyer made several appearances at the Proms in London. In 1959 she sang "Che farò senza Euridice?" from Gluck's Orfeo ed Euridice and Mahler's Songs of a Wayfarer; she repeated the Mahler two years later. In 1973 she sang Clairon in a concert performance of Capriccio by Strauss and in 1977 Schoenberg's "Lied der Waldtaube" from Gurre-Lieder, and in Stravinsky's Pulcinella; later the same season she sang the Proms premiere of Britten's Phaedra.

Meyer often appeared in duet concerts with soprano Elisabeth Söderström. She gave a recital with pianist Geoffrey Parsons at the 1976 Aldeburgh Festival. She was the mezzo soloist in a performance of Mahler's third symphony with the Hallé Orchestra conducted by Sir John Barbirolli in 1969, which was later issued on a BBC Legends CD which also featured a performance of Elgar's Sea Pictures in what was Barbirolli's last recorded concert, at King's Lynn in 1970. She appeared as Iocasta in Stravinsky's Oedipus rex conducted by Georg Solti in the Royal Festival Hall in London, and subsequently recorded the role for Decca. She also gave a recital of songs from Sweden, Spain and France, and German lieder by Gustav Mahler and Hugo Wolf at the Theatre Royal as part of the Wexford Festival Opera in 1977.

She took part in the Swedish entry for the Prix Italia in 1981, Jan W. Morthenson's Trauma, a "meta-opera for radio", with the Swedish Radio Symphony Orchestra conducted by Okko Kamu.

Meyer sang the role of Buttercup in a production of H.M.S. Pinafore in 1980 at the Oscarsteatern in Stockholm. Her final appearance on stage was as Madame Armfeldt in a 2013 production of Stephen Sondheim's A Little Night Music at the Malmö Opera. To coincide with Meyer's appearance in A Little Night Music, Swedish television devoted a documentary to her life and work, including an interview with her and archive television clips.

She served as the rector of University College of Opera, Stockholm, from 1984 to 1994.

Meyer was married to Björn Bexelius, a ballet critic and arts administrator who died in 1997. She was awarded the Illis quorum in 1994 and an honorary CBE in 1995. She died on 14 April 2020, eleven days after her 92nd birthday.

== Discography ==
Meyer left few commercial studio recordings; a number of her radio broadcasts have been subsequently issued (by Caprice, Swedish Society, and BBC Legends).

- Bizet, Carmen (title role, in Swedish) Operan, Sixten Ehrling. Bluebell; recorded Stockholm 1954.
- Operas arias from Carmen and Samson et Dalila, with Kungliga Hovkapellet conducted by Sixten Ehrling, His Master's Voice Sweden (EP), 1955
- Wagner, Die Walküre (Fricka and Rossweiße) Royal Swedish Opera conducted by Sixten Ehrling. Caprice, 1955-56.
- Strauss, Der Rosenkavalier (Annina). Philharmonia Orchestra & Chorus conducted by Herbert von Karajan. EMI, 1956.
- Beethoven, Symphony No. 9, Berlin Philharmonic conducted by André Cluytens. HMV, December 1957.
- Songs by Brahms (11), Sibelius (4), Rangström (4), and de Frumerie (2), with Jacqueline Bonneau, piano. La Voix De son Maitre FALP 568, 1959
- Schoenberg, Das Buch der hängenden Gärten, Op. 15, Glenn Gould (piano). West Hill Archives, 1960.
- Nystroem, New Songs by the Sea Swedish Society Discofil, 1967.
- Berg, Lulu (Gräfin Geschwitz) conducted by Leopold Ludwig. Electrola, 1968.
- Mahler, Symphony No. 3. Hallé Orchestra conducted by John Barbirolli. BBC Legends, recorded 1969.
- Penderecki, Utrenja, The Entombment of Christ – Philadelphia Orchestra, Eugene Ormandy. RCA Red Seal, 1971.
- Stravinsky, Oedipus rex (Jocaste). London Philharmonic Orchestra conducted by Georg Solti. Decca, 1976.
- Operatic excerpts, from Orfeo ed Eurydike, La clemenza di Tito, Alcina, L'incoronazione di Poppea, Il barbiere di Sevilla, Carmen, Prince Igor, Don Carlo, Samson et Dalila, Singoalla, Jenůfa, with the Norrköping Symphony Orchestra conducted by Ulf Björlin (sleeve note by Meyer), recorded June 1978, Norrköping. EMI Svenska AB 7C 061-35593 (LP)
- Duets by Dvořák, Geijer, Kodály, Purcell, Rossini, Tchaikovsky, Wennerberg – Kerstin Meyer, Elisabeth Söderström, with Jan Eyron, piano. BIS, 1991.
- Great Swedish Singers, Kerstin Meyer. Excerpts from Carmen, Mignon, Don Carlos, Les Contes d'Hoffmann, Samson et Dalila, Die Walküre, Elektra, Prince Igor, Singoalla, The Rake's Progress, Jenůfa, and the Verdi Requiem, Bluebell: broadcasts and private recordings made 1954–1972.
