= Karel Berman =

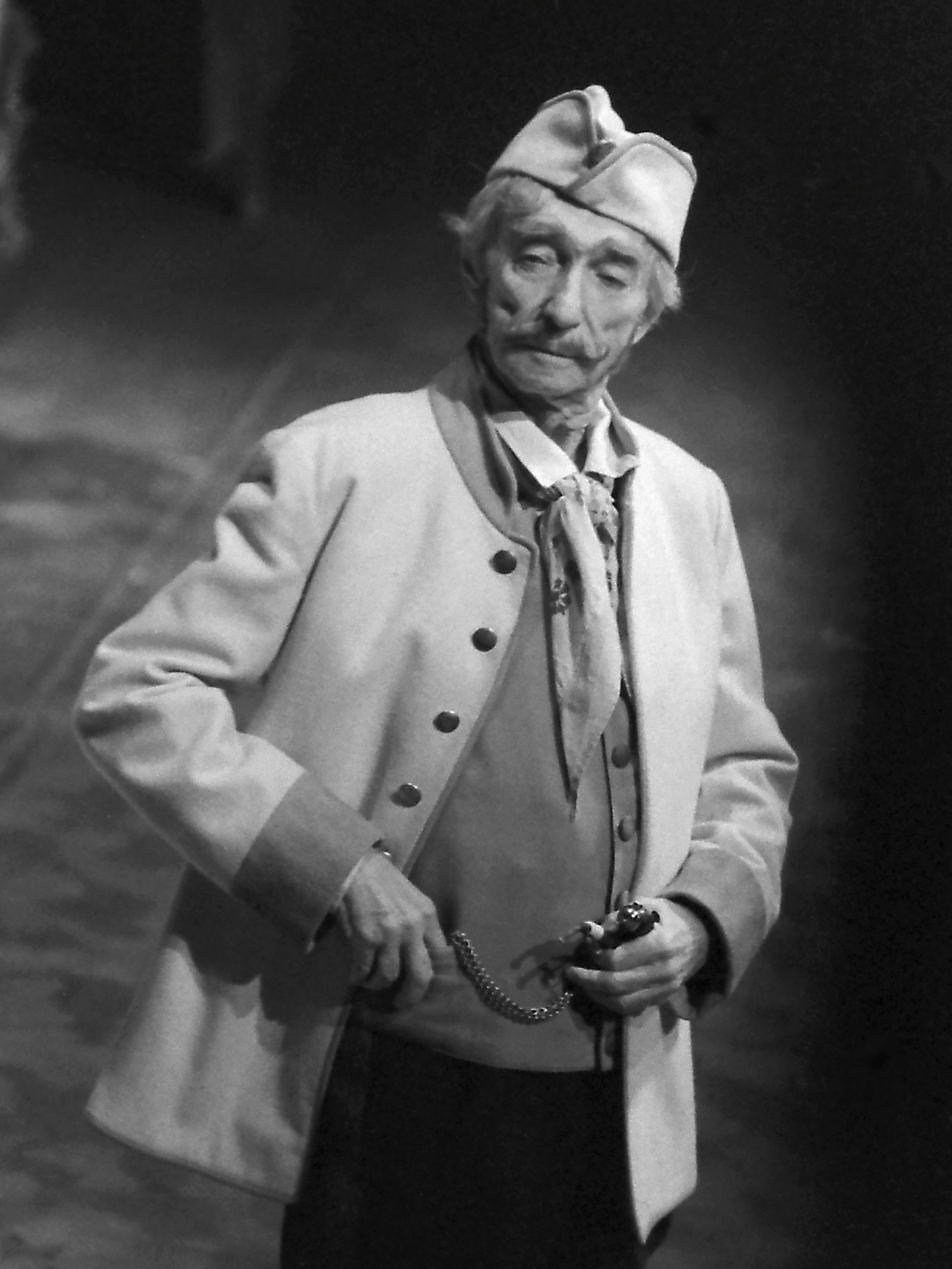
Karel Berman ND1994

Karel Berman (14 April 1919 in Jindřichův Hradec, Czechoslovakia – 11 August 1995 in Prague, Czech Republic) was a Jewish Czech opera singer, composer, opera director, and translator.

== Life ==
After extensive musical education, Karel Berman started his career as a bass singer of opera in Opava. In March, 1943, Berman was deported to Theresienstadt, where he took part in cultural life as a singer, composer and director. On 11 July 1944, for example, he and Rafael Schächter produced the "Four songs to words of Chinese poetry" by Pavel Haas for the first time. In 1944 he composed Suite Terezin in three movements ('Terezin', 'Horror', and 'Alone'); a work which musicologist Bret Web described as "a rare in situ tone portrait of life in a Nazi camp".

Later he was also imprisoned in Kaufering and Auschwitz. He survived the camps and later became famous as an opera singer. In 1953, he joined the Prague National Theatre opera. Berman is also remembered as an opera director, having directed more than 70 operas. He taught at the Prague Conservatory from 1961 to 1971, and from 1964 at the Academy of Performing Arts in Prague.

== Works ==
- 1944 Poupata ("Buds") Bass-baritone songs and piano
  - Majové ráno (Eva Nonfriedová)
  - Co se děje při probuzení (Kamil Bednář)
  - Děti si hrají (Josef Hora)
  - Před usnutím č. 1 (František Halas)
  - Velikonoční (František Halas)
- 1938 - 1945 Reminiscences Suite Piano (first published in 2000)
- Terezín Suite Piano
- Broučci ("Glow-worms" - after the children's book by Jan Karafiát) Soprano and piano (later made world-famous by Jiří Trnka as a cartoon)

== Recordings ==
- Historical recording opera arias, conducted František Dyk
