= Vilém Přibyl =

Czech opera singer (1925–1990)

Vilém Přibyl (born Náchod, 10 April 1925 – died Brno, 21 July 1990) was a Czech operatic tenor. he made his professional debut at the age of 34 in Ústí nad Labem, in 1958.

== Life and career ==
After serving during World War II, Přibyl trained as an electrical technician. In 1952 he took private singing lessons in Hradec Králové, and participated in amateur opera performances; his debut was the same year as Lukas in The Kiss by Smetana. Further appearances there led to an invitation to join the State Opera at Ústí nad Labem, making his professional debut there in 1959 in Rusalka as the Prince.

Two years later Přibyl became a soloist of the National Theatre in Brno which became the base for the rest of his career, initially continuing his studies at the city's Janáček Academy. He also sang regularly with the Prague National Opera. In 1964 he visited Edinburgh with the Prague company, and his performance of the title role in Dalibor led to his Covent Garden debut the same year.

His appearances at Covent Garden included Florestan in Fidelio in 1964 opposite Régine Crespin, Erik in Der fliegende Holländer in 1966 under Georg Solti, and the tenor soloist in the Macmillan ballet Song of the Earth in 1966 with The Royal Ballet alongside mezzo Yvonne Minton, under Hans Swarowsky. He repeated his Florestan in 1967 opposite Gwyneth Jones and in 1971 opposite his compatriot Ludmila Dvořáková; in 1970 he sang as Turiddu in Cavalleria rusticana under Lamberto Gardelli.

Přibyl sang throughout Europe, the USA and Canada, his most regular operas being The Bartered Bride, Dalibor, Carmen, Jenůfa, and Fidelio. Other roles in his repertory ranged from Gluck's Alceste (Admetus) to Shostakovich's Katerina lsmailova (Sergey).

He made a number of recordings, among them Osud (Zivny) and The Excursions of Mr. Brouček (title role) by Leoš Janáček, Dalibor (title role) by Smetana, The Greek Passion (Manolios) by Martinů. For his performance as "a lively and mellifluous" Jiří in The Jacobin, Opera commended his "ageless" voice.

He died of a stroke.
