= Dalibor (opera) =

Opera by Bedřich Smetana

- Opera by Bedřich Smetana
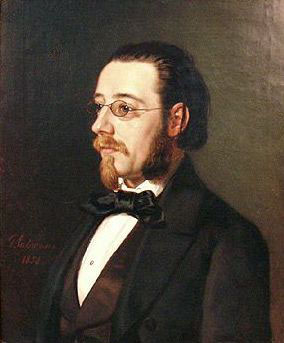
- Smetana in 1854; painting by Geskel Saloman
- Librettist: Josef Wenzig
- Language: Czech
- Premiere: 16 May 1868; Provisional Theatre, Prague

Dalibor is a Czech opera in three acts by Bedřich Smetana. The libretto was written in German by Josef Wenzig, and translated into Czech by Ervín Špindler. It was first performed at the New Town Theatre in Prague on 16 May 1868. The opera received criticism at the time for being overly influenced by German opera, including that of Wagner's Lohengrin.

The subject of the opera is Dalibor of Kozojedy (fl. c. 1490), a Czech knight who took part in an uprising in Ploskovice in support of the oppressed people and was sentenced to death in 1498, during the reign of Vladislaus II of Hungary. The plot bears a resemblance to that of Beethoven's Fidelio, in that the central female characters in each opera disguise themselves in male clothing and gain the confidence of a jailor to try to save the imprisoned hero.

== Performance history ==
Smetana had great affection for the opera, but because of the lukewarm reception, died thinking that he had failed with this opera. The revival in 1886, however, two years after the composer's death, was a success. In the 1890s, the opera received productions in Zagreb, Munich, and Hamburg. Gustav Mahler conducted an 1892 production in Vienna.

== Synopsis ==
Time: 15th century
Place: Prague

=== Act 1 ===
Dalibor, a Czech Knight is on trial before the king for having murdered the burgrave of Ploskovice in revenge for execution of his friend, the musician Zdeněk. At the trial, the king calls upon the burgrave's sister, Milada, who demands his execution. As Dalibor is brought in, the crowd rises in support of him. When Dalibor tells of his friend's capture and murder the court reduces his sentence from death to lifetime imprisonment. Milada painfully realized that she is falling in love with Dalibor, and in collusion with Jitka, an orphan befriended by the knight, she resolves to set him free.

=== Act 2 ===
After a scene in a mercenary camp, where Jitka and her lover Vítek plot to free Dalibor, Milada enters the prison disguised as a boy and finds employment with Dalibor's jailer, Beneš. She charms the jailer into allowing her into the dungeon where Dalibor is being held, to give him his friend's violin. The knight is dreaming, and initially thinks Milada is a reincarnation of his beloved Zdeněk. Then in a passionate duet, they sing of their joy in having found each other.

=== Act 3 ===
In the dungeon, Dalibor looks forward to escape (singing his famous Song to Freedom) but feeling it is a bad omen when one of the strings of Zdeněk's violin breaks. The plot to bribe Beneš fails, and the jailer informs the king of their attempted escape. Taking the advice of his council, the king orders Dalibor's death. Milada, waiting outside the prison, hears the tolling of the bell that signals Dalibor's execution. Accompanied by her followers, she storms the castle, where, after rescuing Dalibor, she is wounded and dies in his arms. Dalibor stabs himself and is united in death with his beloved. An alternative ending has Dalibor executed before Milada can rescue him.

== Roles ==
Role	Voice type	Premiere cast, 16 May 1868 (Conductor: Bedřich Smetana)
Vladislav, Czech King	baritone	Jos. Lev
Dalibor, a knight	tenor	I. L. Lukes
Budivoj, Commander of the castle guard	baritone	Voj. Šebesta
Beneš, the jailor	bass	Jos. Paleček
Vítek, one of Dalibor's mercenaries	tenor	J. Barcal
Milada, sister of the burgrave of Ploškovice	soprano	Em. Benevic-Miková
Jitka, a village maiden on Dalibor's estate	soprano	Eleanora Ehrenbergů
One of the judges	bass	
People, judges, mercenaries, chorus, silent

== Recordings ==
In Czech

- 1950, Jaroslav Krombholc (conductor), Prague National Theatre Chorus and Orchestra; Václav Bednář, Beno Blachut, Teodor Šrubař, Karel Kalaš, Antonín Votava, Marie Podvalová, Štefa Petrová, Jan Hadraba, Jaroslav Kubala, Josef Loskot, Ferdinand Kotas, František Trnka
- 1967, Jaroslav Krombholc, (conductor), Prague National Theatre Chorus and Orchestra; Jindřich Jindrák, Vilém Přibyl, Antonín Švorc, Jaroslav Horáček, Zdeněk Švehla, Naděžda Kniplová, Svobodová-Janků, Jedlička
- 1977, Eve Queler, (conductor), Opera Orchestra of New York and New York Choral Society; Allan Monk, Nicolai Gedda, Harlan Foss, Paul Plishka, John Carpenter, Teresa Kubiak, Nadia Šormová, Raymond Gniewek
- 1995, Zdeněk Košler (conductor), Prague National Theatre Chorus and Orchestra; Eva Urbanová, Jiřina Marková, Leo Marian Vodička, Ivan Kusnjer, Miroslav Kopp, Vratislav Kříž, Jiří Kalendovský, Bohuslav Maršík
- 1999, Yoram David (conductor), Orchestra e Coro del Teatro Lirico di Cagliari; Eva Urbanová, Valerij Popov, Valeri Alexejev, Dagmar Schellenberger, Jiri Kalendovsky, Damir Basyrov, Valentin Prolat, Carmine Monaco, Alexandr Blagodarnyi, Bruno Pestarino
- 2015, Jiří Bělohlávek (conductor), BBC Singers, BBC Symphony Orchestra; Dana Burašová, Alžběta Poláčková, Richard Samek, Aleš Voráček, Ivan Kusnjer, Svatopluk Sem, Jan Stava

In German

- 1969, Josef Krips (conductor), Orchestra and chorus Vienna State Opera; Eberhard Wächter, Ludovico Spiess, Oskar Czerwenka, Walter Kreppel, Adolf Dallapozza, Tugomir Franc, Leonie Rysanek, Lotte Rysanek

In English

- 1955, Vilém Tauský (conductor), BBC Philharmonia Orchestra and Chorus; Joan Hammond (soprano), Richard Lewis (tenor), Suzanne Danco (soprano), Alexander Young (tenor), Dennis Noble (baritone), Ian Blair (baritone), Stanley Clarkson (bass).
- 1969, Vilém Tauský (conductor), BBC Orchestra and Chorus; Pauline Tinsley (soprano), Robert Jones (tenor), Gwyn Griffiths (baritone), Joseph Ward (tenor).

In Italian

- 1973, Luigi Toffolo (conductor), Orchestra Sinfonica e coro di Milano della RAI; Radmila Bakočević (soprano); Ludovic Spiess (tenor); Nikola Mitić (baritone); Dora Carral (mezzo-soprano); Piero De Palma (tenor); Giannicola Pigliucci (basso).
