= The Cunning Peasant =

1878 opera by Antonín Dvořák

- Opera by Antonín Dvořák
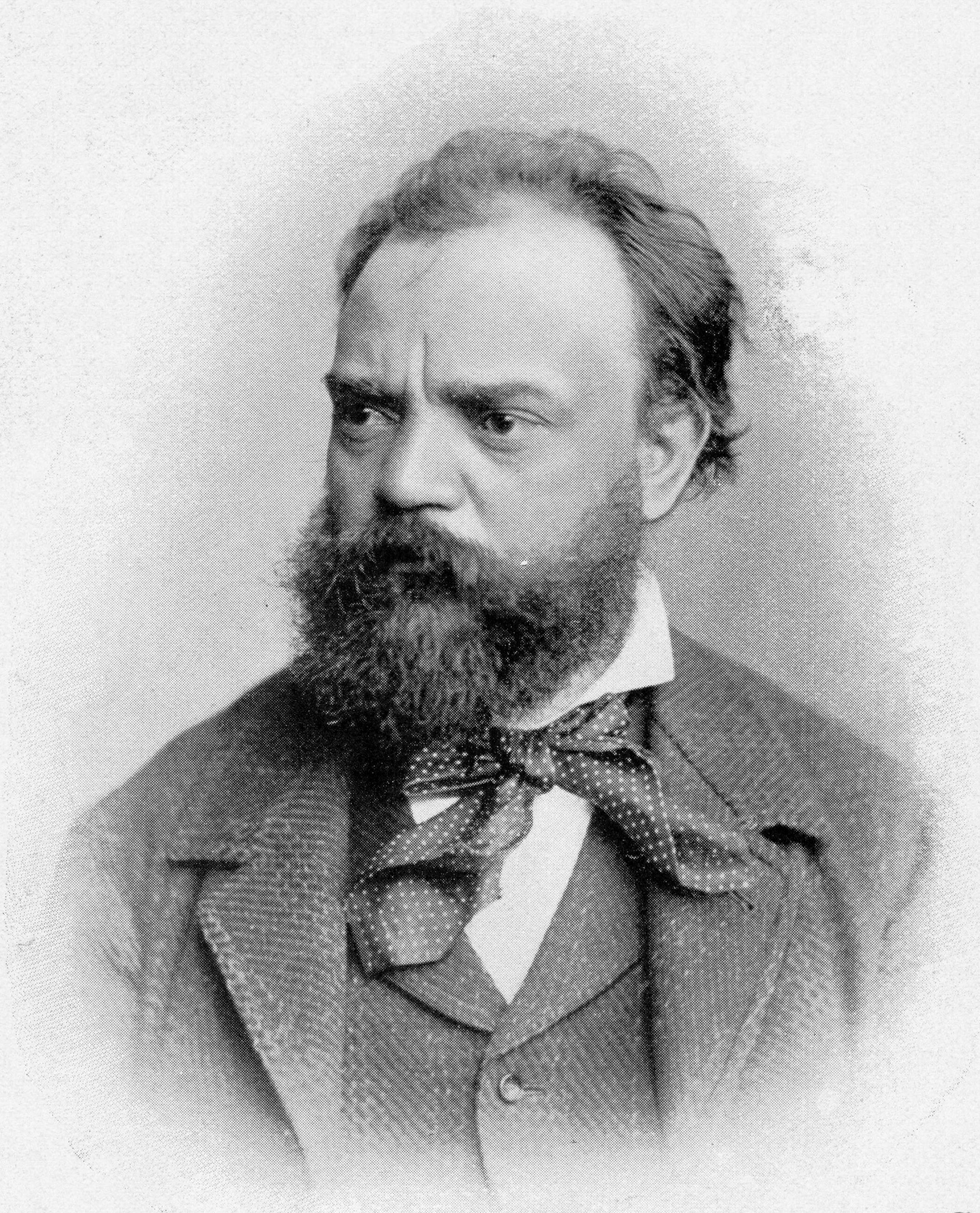
- Dvořák in 1882
- Librettist: Josef Otakar Veselý
- Language: Czech
- Premiere: 1878; Prague

The Cunning Peasant (Czech: Šelma sedlák) is an opera by Antonín Dvořák. The Czech libretto is by Josef Otakar Veselý.

== Composition and reception ==
The Cunning Peasant was written at a time when there was a lack of high-quality Czech dramatic writers. In his 1995 notes to the Supraphon recording, Milan Pospíšil indicates that Veselý did not solve that problem. His libretto demonstrates talent but also uncritical self-confidence and recycles traditional plot elements and even the names of characters. Both Jeník and Václav, for example, are based on models with similar names in The Bartered Bride. The influence of the latter opera is further evidenced by the choice of a rustic setting. Similarities with the plot of The Marriage of Figaro have also been noted.

Dvořák set the libretto without requiring any revisions but he did propose the change of name from the original Políček knížeti (A slap for the Prince). The Cunning is ironic as the protagonist is himself cheated. The composer wrote the music in 1877. His other works of the period include the Stabat Mater, Piano Concerto and Slavonic Dances.

To provide a national character, Dvořák used a variety of dance and other forms in the opera, such as polka, waltz, sousedská, mazur and march, though the music remains typical of the composer. With short numbers, The Cunning Peasant is really an ensemble opera. The music is lyrical with the worlds of the Prince and the folk characters, of the lovers and plotters individually characterised with music that recurs. However, some of these portrayals also anticipate those of similar characters in later operas such as The Jacobin. Contemporary critics saw the musical style as too symphonic. Eduard Hanslick, for example, considered the Act 2 ballet music as better suited for a symphonic scherzo.

== Performance history ==
The opera received its first performance in Prague in 1878 and was also given in Plzeň that same year. When it was performed in Dresden in 1882, it became only the third Czech opera to be given in Germany. It thus represents Dvořák's first real success as an opera composer. It was performed in Hamburg in 1883, but a poor reception in Vienna in 1885 halted the wider progress of this and other of the composer's operas for some time. In the Czech lands, The Cunning Peasant remained popular, though attention was drawn away from it by the première of The Jacobin in 1887. Nevertheless, performances of the opera continued into the 20th century but they have tailed off since 1950. The first British performances were given by John Lewis opera as The Peasant a Rogue in 1963.

== Roles ==
Role	Voice type	Premiere Cast, 1878 (Conductor: Adolf Čech)
Prince	baritone	Josef Lev
Princess	soprano	Teresa Boschetti
Jean, the prince's valet	tenor	Adolf Krössing
Berta, the Princess's chambermaid	soprano	Antonie Tichá
Jeník, a poor country lad	tenor	Antonín Vávra
Martin, a wealthy farmer	bass	Karel Čech
Bětuška, his daughter	soprano	Marie Laušmannová
Václav, a rich farmer's son	tenor	Jan Sára
Veruna, the village forewoman	contralto	Betty Fibichová

== Synopsis ==
=== Act 1 ===
The grounds of a palace

The girls of the village are celebrating May and the love it brings (Zavítal do kraje, zavítal máj), but Bětuška is sad. The chorus try to cheer her up with the hope of the Prince's arrival allowing her love to be fulfilled. Jeník arrives and asks Bětuška why she is sad. It is because her father wishes her to marry a richer man. The two embrace and sing of their hope that God will help their love (Ústa moje, miláčku). Martin, Veruna and Václav arrive as Jeník leaves. Martin tells Bětuška off for spending time with a tramp like Jeník when he has in mind a wealthier husband for her. Bětuška reaffirms her love for Jeník and Veruna supports her, but her father will have none of that. Václav tells her of all the gifts he can give her if she agrees to marry him instead. Bětuška refuses. Martin expresses his anger with her (Dobrá, jdi tedy k němu). The girls return to take Bětuška along with them to collect a bouquet for her to present to the Prince. Thinking they're alone, Václav and Martin discuss what to do. The former expresses frustration feeling that the whole village is mocking him. Martin reassures him that they are both clever Bohemian peasants, (Jsme čestí sedláci, they sing together). They will replace the ladder Jeník usually uses with a plank over a barrel of water. They will beat him after he falls in. However Veruna has been listening and she intends to warn the lovers of the trap.

The whole village turn out to greet the Prince and Princess. When Bětuška gives the Prince the bouquet, both he and Jean are struck by her beauty. Jean tries to pinch her and the jealous Berta complains. Martin and Václav approach the Prince to ask for his agreement to Václav marrying Bětuška. He replies that he will speak to Bětuška first and find out her wishes. When he does so, he says he will grant Jeník a farm and let Bětuška marry her instead, provided she visits the Prince alone at the summerhouse during the evening. Veruna has been listening again and comments to Bětuška about the Prince's lecherous intentions. Meanwhile, they see Jean approaching, strutting like a peacock. He asks Bětuška to leave a ladder outside her window for him. Veruna informs him that there will be a barrel he can climb onto instead. Berta arrives and tells Jean off. Veruna explains to the other two women about how the barrel is a trap. She also visits the Princess who will visit her husband in the summerhouse in the evening instead of Bětuška and give him a slap

=== Act 2 ===
Spring festivities are taking place complete with dancing, beer and a Maypole which a villager climbs to win a prize. As the Prince draws the celebrations to a close, various characters sing of their hopes to end up in Bětuška's arms, to humiliate other characters or, in Bětuška's own case, to end up in Jeník's arms (Kéž mi již zavitá blažená chvíle). Jeník and Bětuška wish each other goodnight (Rozlučme se, drahý (drahá), rozlučme se). She tells him of the Prince's intentions and they think of eloping. Martin sees the barrel into position while Václav feels guilt at what they are planning. Veruna directs the Princess and Berta, both disguised as Bětuška to their respective positions. Thinking he is seducing Bětuška, the Prince complains about how he is bored by his wife. The Princess takes the bond for the promised farm from him before slapping him. Meanwhile Jean tries to climb to Bětuška's window, where Berta is, and falls into the barrel. Martin and Václav rush out to beat him up, egged on by Berta. She and the Princess demand and receive repentance from the Prince and Jean. Everyone blames Martin for having such a beautiful daughter. The Prince instructs him to marry her to Jeník. Martin apologises to Václav who is sure that his wealth will help him find a wife elsewhere. The Prince gives Jeník the deeds to the farm and Martin promises a generous dowry. Everyone praises the Prince and Princess.

== Recordings ==
- Jitka Soběhartová, Josef Kundlák, Václav Zítek, Prague Radio Symphony Orchestra (SOČR) and Chorus, Fanatišek Vajnar. Recorded 1985–86. Supraphon SU 0019-2 632
- Stephen Gunzenhauser and the Slovak Philharmonic Orchestra have recorded the overture for Naxos.
