= Vanda (opera) =

Opera by Antonín Dvořák

- Tragic opera by Antonín Dvořák
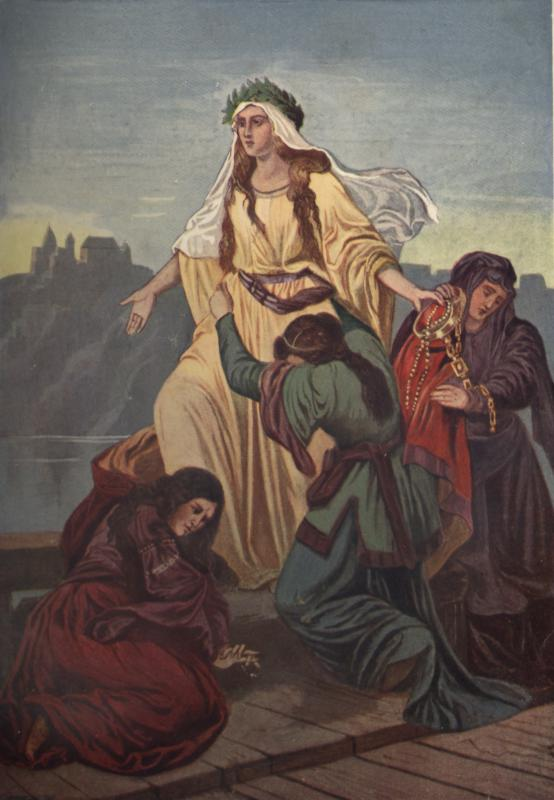
- Picture of Maksymilian Piotrowski Tod of Wanda
- Native title: Vanda
- Librettist: Václav Beneš Šumavský, František Zákrejs
- Language: Czech
- Based on: Julian Surzycki (?)
- Premiere: 17 April 1876; Provisional Theatre, Prague

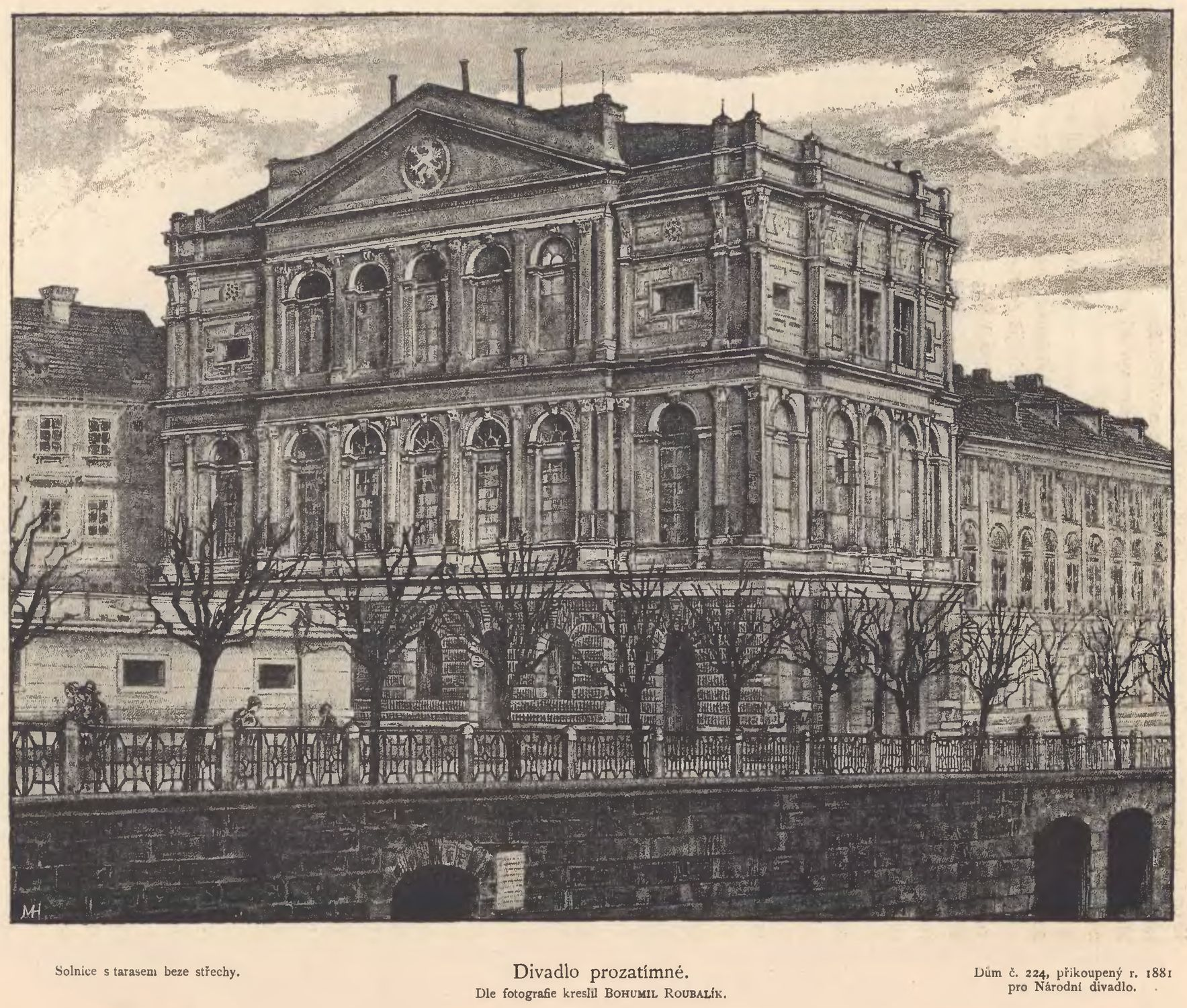
Provisional Theatre, site of the opera's premiere

Vanda is an early opera by the Czech composer Antonín Dvořák about the legendary Polish (Kraków) princess Vanda, which was literarised in the movement of the national revival by Julian Surzycki from Warsaw, a Polish national awakener, politician, civil engineer and occasional poet. His book was translated from the Polish by Václav Beneš Šumavský and adapted to libretto together with František Zákrejs in 1875. The premiere took place on 17 April 1876 at the Provisional Theatre in Prague.

== Origin of the work ==
After composing operas King and Charcoal Burner and The Stubborn Lovers, Dvořák turned to classical opera, and directly to the genre of grand opera. In the time between the composition of Slavonic Rhapsodies and Slavonic Dances, he logically turned to Slavic themes.

The librettists Václav Beneš Šumavský and František Zákrejs wrote their libretto based on a short tale by Ing. Julian Surzycki. Musicologist Alan Houtchens mistakenly judged the source to be German, but the skeleton of the story comes from a popular Polish legend about Princess Wanda, who refused to marry the German Prince Rüdiger, and when the Prince attacked the Poles, Vanda defeated him in battle, whereupon she committed suicide by jumping into the Vistula as a sacrifice for victory. A necessary amorous element in the libretto of the opera is the character of the Polish knight Slawomir, supplied by the authors, who bids for Vanda's hand and share in the government, although he is not of noble origin.

Beneš's and Zákrejs' libretto follows the elements of Meyerbeer's grand opera: five acts, alternating choral scenes, ensembles and arias, and the use of various traditional scenes and settings (religious ceremonies, a fight scene, a witch scene, a coronation, hymns and dirges) to give the composer the opportunity to use different musical devices. However, there is a lack of dramatic structure, most of the opera consists of static scenes, the characters are poorly portrayed and lack psychological development, and some scenes - for example, the spectacular scene with the witch Homena - seem to have no relevance to the plot. According to Anna Hostomská, when reading the text, one regrets the composer for having to resort to this strange creation for lack of a more suitable libretto.

Dvořák, however, set the text to music with great care. The basic idea of the work and the character of Vanda, who becomes ruler against her will and eventually sacrifices her life for her country, clearly inspired him: Vanda's arias at these two crucial moments: "Gods great, gods terrible" ("Bohové velcí, bohové strašliví") and "Only one thing I wish for myself now..." ("Jen jedno nyní ještě přeji sobě"), are among the opera's best moments. Dvořák dealt with the second act the worst, but the scene of witch Homena in third act does not deny that it is a precursor of the scenes with Ježibaba in Rusalka. The most elaborate and admirable parts are the numerous and extensive choruses, for example in the scenes of Vanda's coronation, the double choral invocation of the gods in fourth act, and the hymnic celebration of the dead queen at the end of the opera. The emphasis on choruses is reminiscent of Dvořák's later opera Dimitrij and the oratorio Saint Ludmila. On the other hand, they contribute to Vanda's static, rather oratorical form, which is a hindrance to its dramatic effectiveness. The opera's orchestration has always been appreciated as well; according to Šourek, Dvořák is here already a master of the Berlioz-like rich and bold palette here.

However, the opera's generous treatment did not match the possibilities of the Provisional Theatre in Prague, for which Vanda was intended. It lacked adequate singing forces, a sufficiently large choirs and orchestral parts, and the theatre's small and technically unsophisticated stage did not allow for the successful staging of monumentally conceived scenes, although the theatre's management tried to give the most dignified performance possible. The premiere on 17 April 1876 was a great satisfaction for Dvořák. According to the newspaper Národní listy the opera house was full on all rings and galleries, and in defiance of the tropical heat the audience was excellently animated and stayed until end of the performance. The success was most decided. Immediately after the first act the composer was noisily called several times, and afterwards more than once after each other act.

== Performance history ==
Despite her initial success, Vanda did not establish herself on the stage. After the premiere, only four performances followed. The Provisional Theatre prepared a new production in 1880; Dvořák made some changes for the occasion based on his experience with the first performance. Above all, he replaced the original shorter introduction with a completely new overture, which remained a concert piece even after the opera disappeared from the repertoire, and thus became the most famous and most appreciated part of the work. However, the 1880 production was not well prepared. The more challenging parts – including the entire, musically most colourful third act – were cut, and it eventually received only three performances. Dvořák negotiated for a performance of Vanda at the Vienna Court Opera (1879), a performance that had already been announced but was abandoned, like a later performance in Budapest. Plans were made to stage it at the newly completed National Theatre in 1883 and then on the occasion of Dvořák's sixtieth birthday in 1901. The composer made some changes for both occasions, but in both cases the actual performance did not take place. Thus Dvořák never saw his opera again and never actually saw a worthy performance of it.

Even after the composer's death, Vanda remained a rarity. It was staged by the Municipal Theatre in Plzeň in 1925, and in 1929 Otakar Ostrčil conducted three performances at the National Theatre in Prague. After a long hiatus, Vanda was staged by the Olomouc Theatre in 1989 and returned to Prague for one concert performance at the Smetana Theatre (today State Opera) on 20 May 1991.

One of the difficulties in performing Vanda was the unsatisfactory condition of the musical material for a long time - the virtual absence of a reliable score. In fact, Dvořák sent an autograph of the score to his publisher August Alwin Cranz in Leipzig in the early 1880s, and this manuscript was destroyed in an air raid on that city in 1943. Dvořák did, however, receive back from Cranz the (imperfect) copy to which he had made alterations in 1883 and 1900, and in addition the original performance material and the 1875 piano excerpt survive. On the basis of these, and at the invitation of the German conductor Gerd Albrecht, the American musicologist Alan Houtchens made a reconstruction of the original score. Albrecht was otherwise instrumental in a certain renaissance of Vanda. He made the first recording of the virtually complete version of the opera (1999), gave the first (concert) performances of Vanda outside the Czech lands (Amsterdam 2003, Vienna 2004) and conducted the last production of this opera to date, which took place at the National Theatre in Prague (premiere 9 May 2004, 5 performances). In the spring of 2004, Vanda was first performed in the UK by University College Opera at London's Bloomsbury Theatre.

== Roles and first cast ==
Roles, voice types, and premiere cast
Role	Voice type	Premiere cast, 17 April 1876 Conductor: Adolf Čech
Vanda, the Polish queen	soprano	Marie Zofie Sittová
Božena, her sister	mezzo-soprano	Ema Maislerová-Saková
Homena, witch	contralto	Betty Fibichová
Lumir, Krakow singer	baritone	Leopold Stropnický
Roderik, a German prince	baritone	Josef Lev
Slavoj, a Polish knight of humble birth, in love with Vanda	tenor	Antonín Vávra
Velislav	tenor	Josef Šmaha
Všerad	tenor	Josef Chramosta
Vitomír	tenor	Ferdinand Koubek
Messenger	tenor	Jan Sára
Herald	tenor	Petr Doubravský
Pagan high priest	bass	Karel Čech
Vladykas and lords, soldiers, peasants of the land of Kraków, maidens of Vanda's retinue, pagan priests and priestesses, foreign knights
Conductor: Adolf Čech, stage director: Edmund Chvalovský

== Synopsis ==
It in Krakow, Poland, in legendary times.

=== Act 1 ===
(Plain in front of Wawel, trees) The girls praise the beauty of nature and the power of the god Svantovít (chorus: "Slunko svítí, slunko hřeje, Svantovít dal máj" / The sun shines, the sun warms, Svantovít gave May"). The daughters of the late ruler Krak, Vanda and Božena, arrive. Vanda is burdened by something, sends the girls away and confides to Božena her fears about how she, as a "weak girl", chosen to her father's throne, will manage to rule the Polish land well.

The knight Slavoj comes to say goodbye to Vanda: he reminds her of their childhood together and of his heroic deeds (the duet "Ó královno má překrásná" / "O Queen My Beautiful" and Slavoj's romance "Hned, když jsem ještě hochem byl" / "Now When I Was a Boy"). But now he must give up his desire for her, because as a young man of humble origins he cannot become the Queen's husband. But Vanda holds him back and gives him hope (the duet "Oj, mocní bohové, co jsem/jsi to pověděla!" / "O mighty gods, what have I/you said!"). So Slavoj stays by her side, but a messenger arrives from the German Prince Roderich, who asks for Vanda's hand in the name of his master. However, she has already refused it twice during her father's lifetime, and would like to do the same now (singing "To vše jsou pro mne divná, marná slova" / "All these are strange, vain words to me"), but leaves the final decision to the council of peasants.

The old high priest, guardian of pagan traditions but also of the privileges of noblemen, calls on Vanda to explicitly accept the choice as queen (the aria "Krakova dcero, otcem vyvolená, korunu abys nesla na své skráni" / "Daughter of Krak, chosen by your father, you shall wear the crown on your cheek"). Vanda still resists, but the sign of thunder, the messenger of the god Perun, confirms the decision of the deceased ruler. The new queen begs the gods to assist her in her reign (the aria "Bohové velcí, bohové strašliví" / "The great gods, the terrible gods"). The assembled people celebrate her (the chorus "Bohové naši velcí, spanilí nám dali vědět vůli svou" / "Our great gods, the spanil have made their will known to us") and dance the mazurka.

The coronation ceremony takes place. Vanda swears to the gods that she is always willing to lay down her life for her faith and her fatherland. The people sing the hymnus "Nebe i země bohové naši" / "Heaven and earth are our gods".

=== Act 2 ===
(Ibid.) In the great assembly the people pay homage to Vanda (chorus "Na velebném trůně děva krásná, mladá" / "On the glorious throne of the maiden fair, young"), but the High Priest reminds Krak's of the condition that the Queen must choose a bridegroom, and he must be either a nobelmen ("lech") or a prince, whether of native or foreign birth. The candidate must, according to a resolution of the peasant council, complete one of the tasks: shooting an apple with a bow, throwing a threshing machine over a branch and piercing a shield with a spear. The singer Lumír represents three noble suitors, Vitomír, Velislav and Všerad (Lumír's chant "Zde jest Vitomír, lech vítězný" / "Here is Vitomír, the victorious nobelmen"). However, to the chorus' gloating, none of them fulfils their task. Slavoj volunteers to carry out the tasks; although the high priest wants to prevent him from doing so, at the people's insistence Slavoj is admitted to the contest and carries out all three tasks. While the people and Vanda rejoice, the high priest continues to consider the marriage impossible (Slavoj's aria "Ó, duchu Krakův, vstup zde mezi nás" / "O spirit of Krak, enter here among us").

At that moment, Prince Roderich arrives and declares himself in the contest for Vanda's hand (aria "Hory, kde les vroubí zelený, země bohaté jsem mocný pán" / "The mountains, where the forest grows green, the rich land I am a mighty lord"). At Roderich's challenge, Slavoj comes forward; Roderich at first insults him because he is not his equal, but eventually engages him in a duel in which Slavoj overcomes the prince. At Vanda's intervention, he leaves Roderich alive. While almost everyone hopes that this settles the struggle for Vanda and the rule of the country (the tercet "Půtka ostaň jediná" / "Quarrel remain the only one"), the High Priest warns of further strife.

=== Act 3 ===
(The Sacrifice place of the Black God, night) Vanda meets Slavoj in this remote place to learn the prophecies about the fate of the country (Vanda's aria "Vůkol temno vládne krajem" / "Round the darkness rules the land" and the duet "Budoucnosti dálnou dobu mocným kouzlem odhalím" / "I will reveal the future by a mighty spell"). They both hide when the witch Homena enters with her helpers to prepare a sacrifice to the Black God (Homena's chant "Již půlnoc nastává a děsná černá vůkol noc" / "Midnight is coming and the night is terrible black all around"). Prince Roderich, with his two guides, seeks out Homena and asks her to help him, "by magic or treachery", to seize Vanda, with whom he once fell headlong in love when he met her hunting (Roderich's ballad "Když ondy srnu honila, do mého lesa zbloudila... Srdce moje láskou plane ku spanilé panně" / "When the other day she chased the roe, into my forest she wandered... My heart is aflame with love for the fair maiden").

Before Roderich and Homena can agree, Vanda and Slavoj come out of hiding. Although Roderich defends himself against Slavoj, he is soon disarmed by the reinforcements brought by Božena (singing "Taste zbraně ku obraně královny své!" / "Draw weapons to protect your queen!"). Vanda reveals what the prince was up to, but eventually protects him from the vengeful people and releases him to keep the peace. As Roderich leaves, he threatens to take revenge on Vanda's entire nation.

=== Act 4 ===
(Inside the Pagan Prayer Room) Roderich has approached Kraków with his army; a battle is about to take place. The High Priest blames Vanda and her love for Slavoj (the aria "Co Vanda slove naší královnou" / "What Vanda says to be our Queen" and the chorus "Bitva blíží se k našim až prahům" / "The battle is coming to our doorsteps"). Božena also brings bad news from the battle (the aria "Zlaté slunce ozářilo vojska vrahů zlatý roj" / "The golden sun has illuminated the murderers' armies with a golden swarm"). Vanda herself comes to the altars in bloodied armour. In a passionate prayer, she promises the gods that she will sacrifice her life for the victory of the Polish army (aria "Velcí bohové, nás slyšte, vlast již hyne nám" / "Great Gods, hear us, our homeland is already perishing"). From the hands of the High Priest he receives his father's battle standard and rushes back into battle, while the High Priest leads the invocation of the gods (aria "Padněte všichni zbožně na kolena... Ó nejmocnější bože tříhlavý" / "Fall on your knees, all ye pious... O most mighty God of the three heads").

After a while, the victorious song of Vanda's army is heard from outside, which then enters the prayer room (the choir "První díky sluší bohům vznést" / "First thanks befitting the gods"). Slavoj in particular has distinguished himself in battle, Vanda herself having killed Roderich in the heat of battle. All celebrate their victory (choir "Ó nebesa, srdce plesá za to vítězství" / "O heavens, the heart rejoices for the victory"). But when the people urge Vanda to marry the heroic Slavoj now, Vanda refuses: she has made a vow to the gods and given up her happiness (choir "Zasvěcen bohům její život jest" / "Dedicated to the gods is her life").

=== Act 5 ===
(Terrace in front of Wawel) Vanda and Slavoj watch the sunrise (duet "Jsem šťasten, že mne miluješ... Jak krásně, hleď, uprostřed hor" / "I am happy that you love me... How beautiful, look, in the middle of the mountains"). The idyll is short-lived, however, as the Queen bids farewell to her lover and her sister. Their insistence that she change her mind clashes with Vanda's determination. The high priest also confirms that the gods demand her death. Vanda asks for a white rose from Slavoj (aria "Jen jedno nyní ještě přeji sobě" / "Only one more I wish for myself now") and then jumps off the cliff into the Vistula. The high priest announces the fulfillment of the gods' will, Slavoj and Božena are overwhelmed, and the people pay their last tribute to their queen (chorus "Pro lid, který milovala, život věnovala" / "For the people she loved, she gave her life").

== Recordings ==
- 1951 (originally radio recording, released on LP 1985, CD 1996, Supraphon SU 3007-2 602) Sung by (Vanda) Drahomíra Tikalová, (Božena) Štefa Petrová, (Slavoj) Beno Blachut, (velekněz) Karel Kalaš, (Lumír) Bořek Rujan, (Homena) Ludmila Hanzalíková, (Roderich) Václav Bednář, (messenger) Zdeněk Jankovský. Pražský symfonický orchestr (The Prague Radio Orchestra) and the Pěvecký sbor Československého rozhlasu v Praze (Czechoslovak Radio Choir in Prague), conducted by František Dyk. Considerably abridged.
- 1999 (Orfeo C 149 0003 F) Olga Romanko (Wanda), Irina Tchistjakova (Božena), Peter Straka (Slavoj), Pavel Daniluk (Heidnischer Hohepriester), Ivan Kusnjer (Lumír), Michelle Breedt (Homena), Ivan Kusnjer (Roderich), Jörg Pavelec (Herold des Roderich / Ritter), Gerd Grochowski (Hlasatel / Ritter), Petr Frýbert (Ritter), Pražský komorní sbor (Prague Chamber Choir), WDR Rundfunkchor Köln, WDR Sinfonieorchester Köln, Gerd Albrecht (Cond.)
- 2004 (unreleased) Sung by (Vanda) Olga Romanko, (Bozena) Jolana Folgašová, (Slavoj) Valentin Prolat, (High Priest) Oleg Korotkov, (Lumir) Roman Janál, (Homena) Yvona Škvárová, (Roderich) Ivan Kusnjer. Orchestr a sbor národního divadla Praha (The orchestra and choir of the National Theatre in Prague), conducted by Gerd Albrecht. Considerably abridged.
