= Jana Sýkorová =

Czech operatic contralto (born 1973)

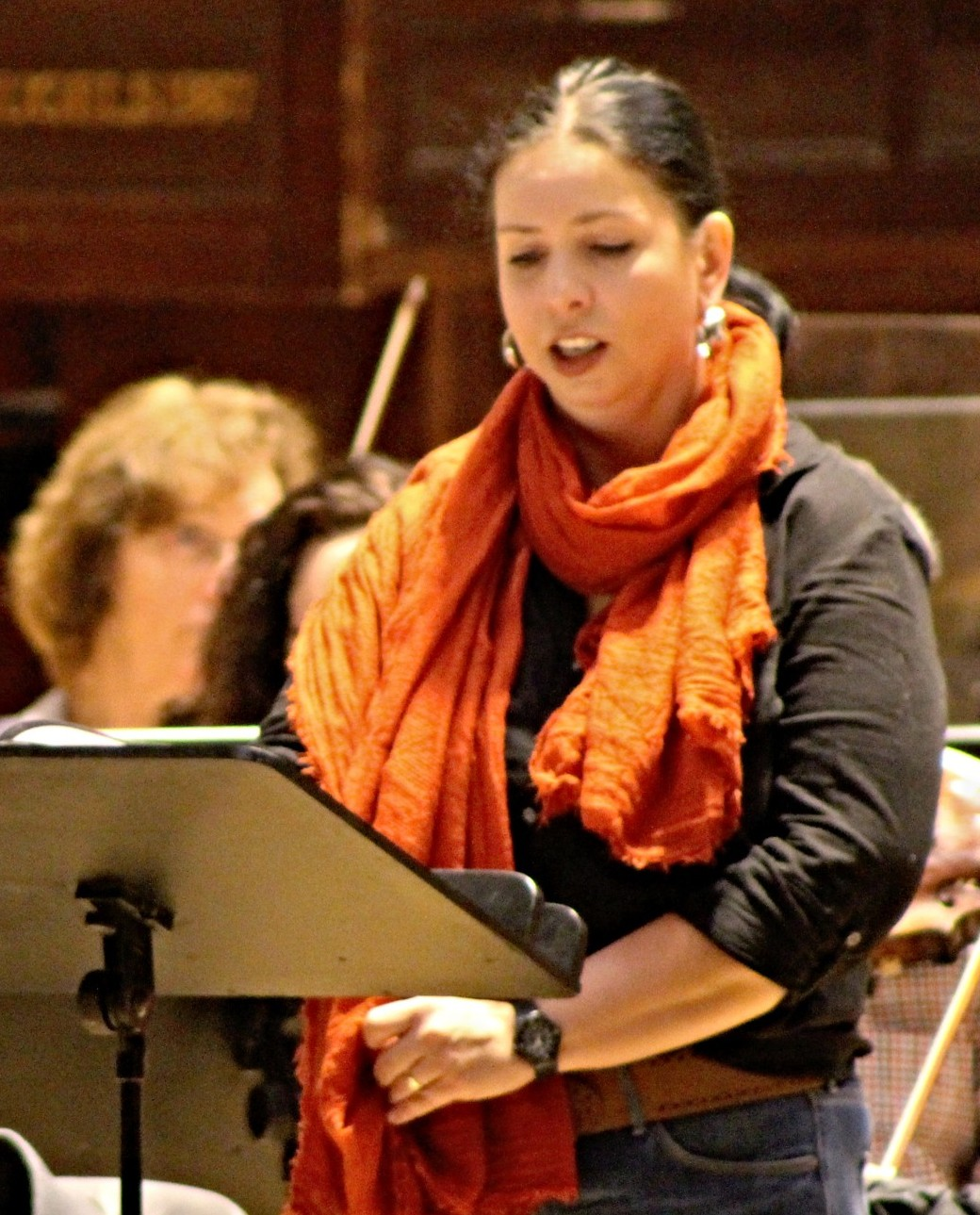
- Jana Sýkorová as a soloist in a performance of Stabat Mater by Antonin Dvořák

Background information
- Born: 9 June 1973 (age 53); Karlovy Vary, Czechoslovakia
- Genres: Opera
- Occupation: Singer
- Instrument: Vocals
- Years active: 1997–present

Jana Sýkorová (born 9 June 1973) is a Czech operatic contralto. She has been a leading soloist with the Prague State Opera since 1999. Since 2002, she has been a permanent guest at the National Theatre in Prague and was made a permanent guest at the National Theatre in Brno in 2006.

== Biography ==
Born in Karlovy Vary, Sýkorová studied under Brigita Šulcová at the Prague Conservatory. She has won several singing competitions, including first prize at the International Singing Contest of Carlsbad in 1997 and the "Förderpreis für junge Künstler" in 1998. While still a student, she made her professional opera debut at the National Theatre in Prague in a small role in Richard Strauss's Der Rosenkavalier under the baton of Jiří Kout in 1997. Shortly thereafter, she made her first appearance at the Prague State Opera as La Cieca in Amilcare Ponchielli's La Gioconda. In 1998, she joined the roster of principal singers at the Liberec Theatre where she was committed for one year.

In 1999, Sýkorová became a member of the Prague State Opera which remains her principal home to this day. She made her debut with the company in the title role of Georges Bizet's Carmen, a role which she has since become particularly associated. Some performance highlights with the company include the world premiere of Emil Viklický's Phaedra, Pallas in a concert version of Camille Saint-Saëns's Hélène, the title role in the Czech premiere of Antonio Vivaldi’s Orlando Furioso, and the Elephant Man in the world premiere of Laurent Petitgirard's Joseph Merrick dit Elephant Man. Other roles she has performed on the stage of the Prague State Opera include Anitra in Edvard Grieg's Peer Gynt, Maddalena in Rigoletto, Fenena in Nabucco, Suzuki in Madame Butterfly, Ulrica in Un ballo in maschera, and Ursula in Béatrice et Bénédict.

In 2002, Sýkorová was made a permanent guest artist at the Prague National Theatre. Her roles at this theatre include Carmen, Kate in The Devil and Kate, and Panna Roza in The Secret. She is also a permanent guest artist at the Brno National Theatre where she is a much loved Carmen. On the international stage she sang Grimgerde in Die Walküre at the Wagner Festival Wels in 2000 and 2001. In 2002, she sang the Elephant Man in the French premiere of Joseph Merrick dit Elephant Man at Opéra de Nice. She made her first appearance in Berlin in 2001 in a production of Viklický's Death and that same year sang Fenena at the Aspendos International Opera and Ballet Festival. She made her debut in the Royal Opera House, Covent Garden as Maddalena and returned there in 2008 to portray Mercedes in Carmen.

As a contralto, Sýkorová has performed numerous times with the Czech Philharmonic, Prague Symphony Orchestra, Prague Radio Symphony Orchestra, and other orchestras in her native country. She has also performed with major symphony orchestras in Denmark, Norway, France, Italy, Great Britain, Spain, Poland, Hungary, Slovak Republic and Japan.
