= The Stubborn Lovers =

Opera by Antonín Dvořák

- Comic opera by Antonín Dvořák
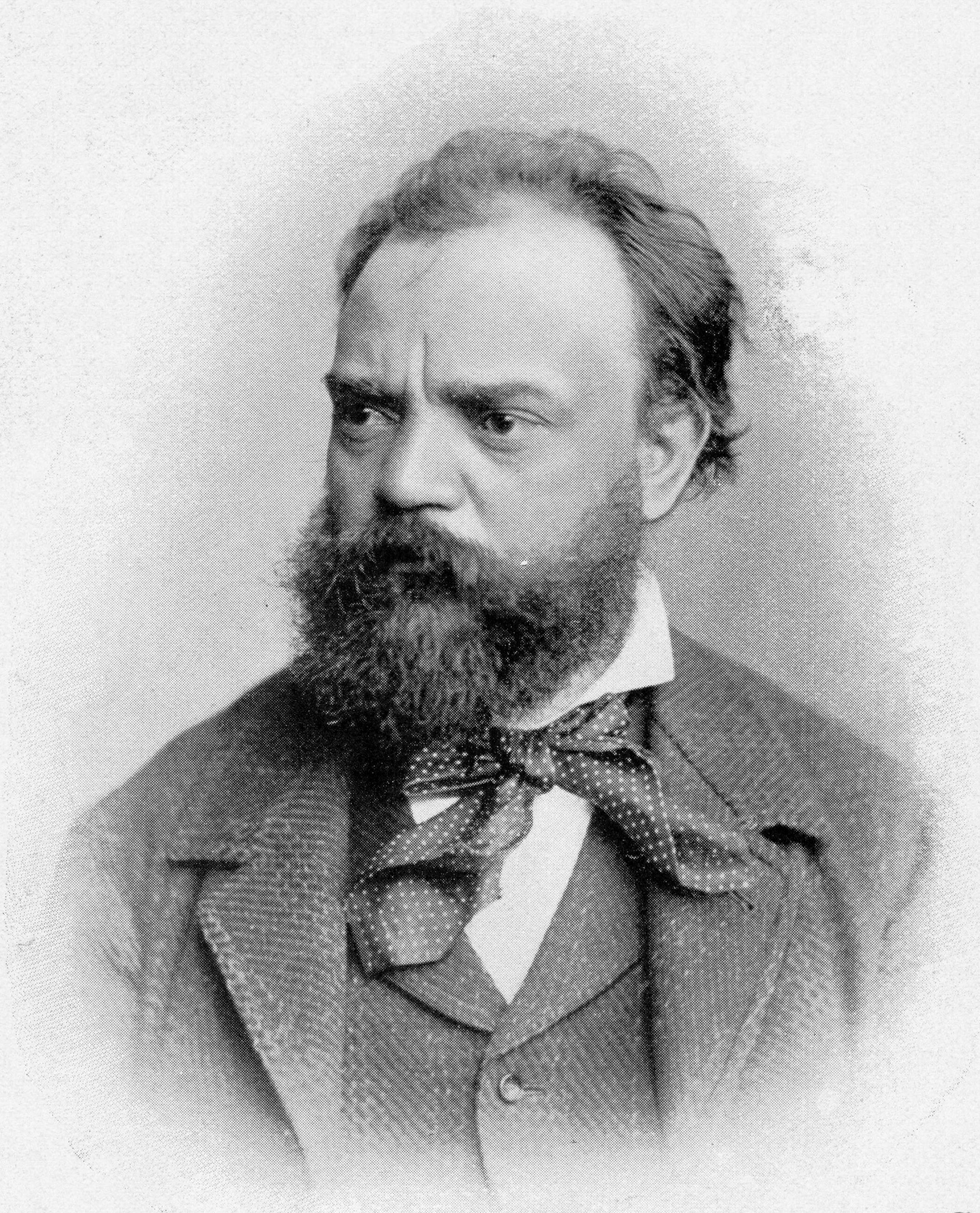
- Antonín Dvořák in 1882
- Librettist: Josef Štolba
- Language: Czech
- Premiere: 2 October 1881; New Czech Theatre, Prague

The Stubborn Lovers (Czech: Tvrdé palice), Op. 17, is a one-act comic opera in 16 scenes by Czech composer Antonín Dvořák. It was written in 1874 to the libretto of the Czech lawyer and writer Josef Štolba (1846–1930). In English, the work is also known as The Pig-Headed Peasants.

== Performance history ==
The première took place on 2 October 1881 at the New Czech Theatre (Nové české divadlo) in Prague, but was withdrawn from the stage after the second performance as the management of the theatre could not reach an agreement with the composer on his royalties. The opera was staged very rarely during Dvořák's lifetime; nonetheless, it later became part of the standard Czech operatic repertoire.

== Roles ==
Roles, voice types, premiere cast
Role	Voice type	Premiere cast, 2 October 1881 Conductor: Mořic Anger
Říhová	contralto	Betty Fibichová
Řeřicha	bass	Karel Čech
Lenka	soprano	Helena Frommová
Vávra	baritone	Leopold Stropnický
Toník	tenor	Adolf Krössing

== Synopsis ==
Two village neighbours, widower Vávra and widow Říhová, came to an agreement that their children, Toník and Lenka, will be married, but without their approval. The godfather of the youngsters, old Řeřicha, knows that they love each other, but they are too stubborn to yield to any pressure. The young pair refuses to obey their parents and the cunning Řeřicha tries to find a way out. He suggests to the lovers that actually old Vávra (Toník's father) wants to marry Lenka, while Říhová (Lenka's mother) is to get Toník as a husband. Řeřicha arranges a secret meeting, first with Lenka then with Toník, and they spy on the meetings of their counterparts and their alleged old suitors. Toník and Lenka start to be jealous of each other. Řeřicha's successful trick spreads fast through the village and the parents become targets of ridicule. Toník and Lenka regret their stubbornness and admit their love. Finally, Řeřicha admits he set the trap only for the sake of uniting the "stubborn lovers", and everything concludes in a happy ending.

== Recordings ==
- 2004, Jiří Bělohlávek (conductor), Prague Philharmonic Orchestra and Chorus, Jana Sýkorová (Říhová), Gustáv Beláček (Řeřicha), Zdena Kloubová (Lenka), Roman Janál (Vavra), and Jaroslav Březina (Toník). Supraphon SU 3765-2631
