= Armida (Dvořák) =

Opera by Antonín Dvořák

- Opera by Antonín Dvořák
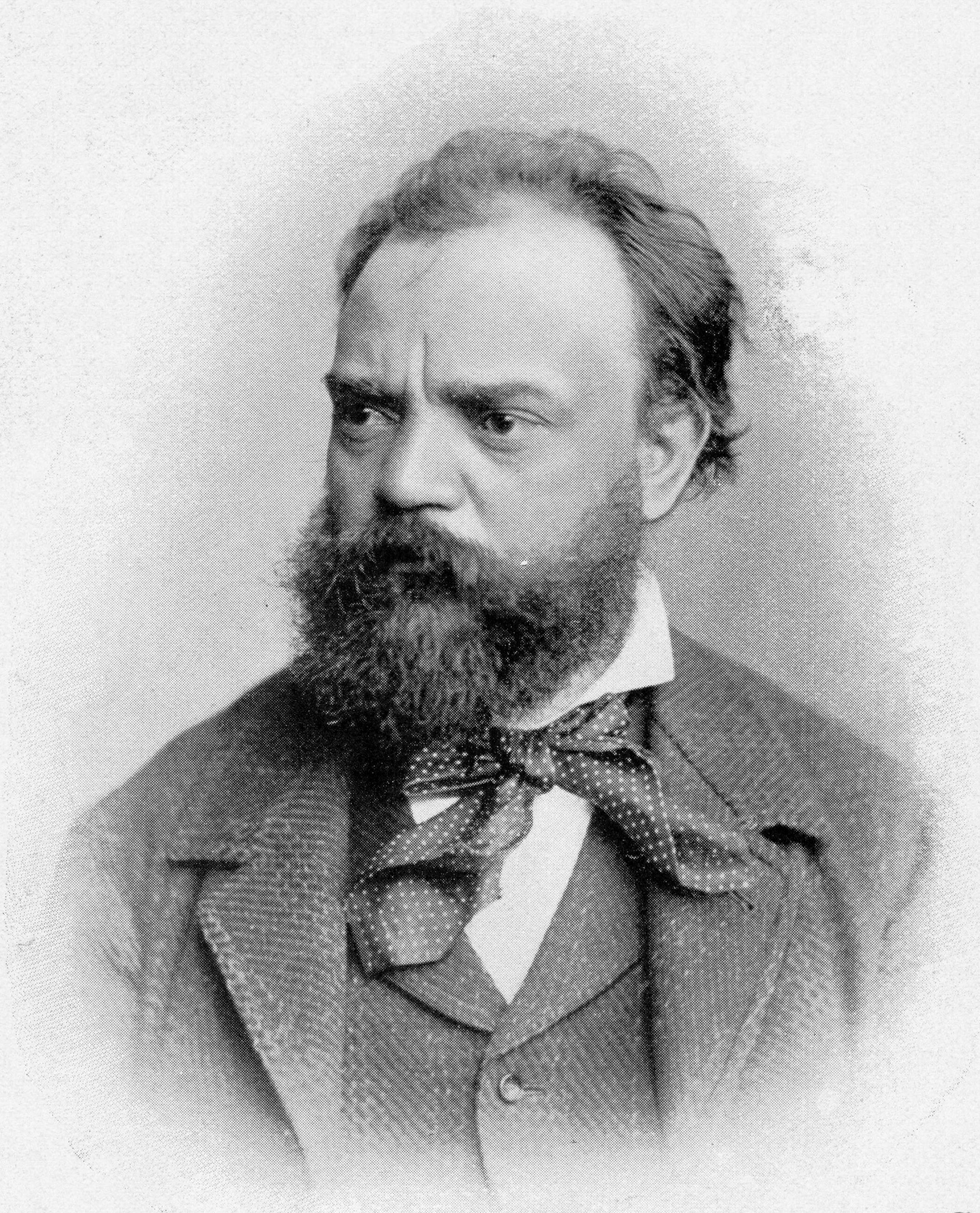
- The composer in 1882
- Librettist: Jaroslav Vrchlický
- Language: Czech
- Based on: Torquato Tasso's La Gerusalemme liberata
- Premiere: 25 March 1904; National Theatre, Prague

Armida is an opera by Antonín Dvořák in four acts, set to a libretto by Jaroslav Vrchlický that was originally based on Torquato Tasso's epic La Gerusalemme liberata. Dvořák's opera was first performed at Prague's National Theatre on 25 March 1904; the score was published as Opus 115 in 1941.

While Armida represents the culmination of Dvořák's experimentation with a Wagnerian style of opera composition, much of the music is in Dvořák's personal style. Vrchlický's libretto parallels the one that Philippe Quinault wrote for Jean-Baptiste Lully in their opera of the same name. Despite three love-duets for Armida and Rinald, their characters are sketchily motivated. Dvořák, determined "to write a big role for Růžena Maturová, his first Rusalka and first Princess in The Devil and Kate" provides her with "the best music, including a gorgeous entrance aria in which she describes dreaming of being a gazelle hunted by a handsome knight".

== Roles ==
Role	Voice type	Premiere Cast, 25 March 1904 (Conductor: František Picka)
King Hydraot of Damascus	bass	Emil Pollert
Armida, his daughter	soprano	Růžena Maturová
Ismen, a prince and magician	baritone	Bohumil Benoni
Petr, a hermit	bass	Václav Kliment
Bohumir, commander of the Franks	baritone	Václav Viktorin
Rinald, a crusader	tenor	Bohumil Pták
Dudo	tenor	Bedřich Bohuslav
Sven	tenor	Adolf Krössing
Roger	tenor	Hynek Švejda
Gernand	bass	Robert Polák
Ubald	bass	František Šír
A herald	bass	Otakar Chmel
Muezin	baritone	Jan Vildner
Siren	soprano	Marie Kubátová
A nymph	soprano	Vilemína Hájková
Choruses of Demons, Nymphs, Sirens, Sprites, Knights etc

== Synopsis ==
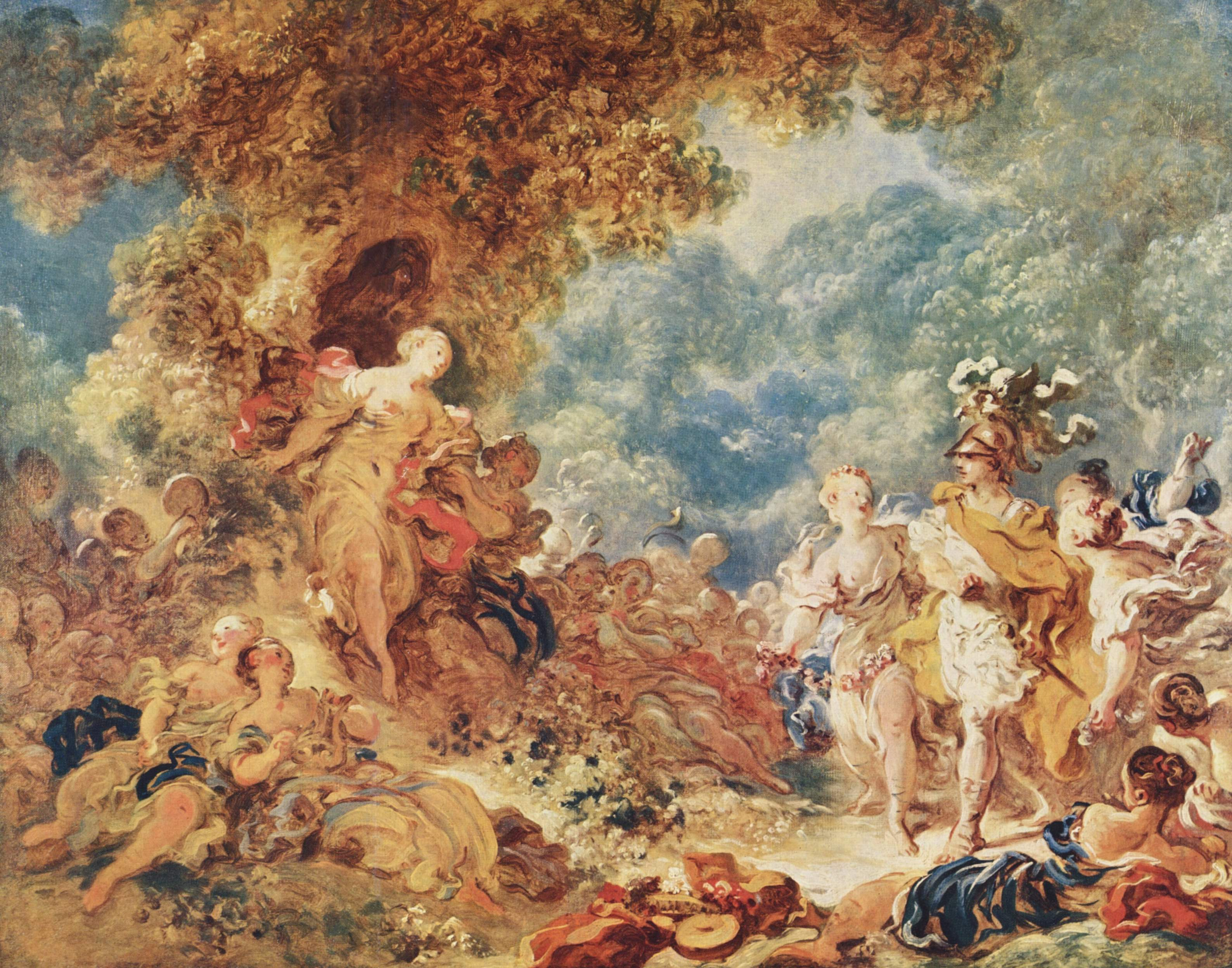
Rinaldo in the garden of Armida, painting by Fragonard (Louvre)

In the royal gardens of Damascus, the call to prayer is heard. Ismen enters with news of the approaching Franks but tries to dissuade the king from an immediate confrontation. He advises sending the king's daughter Armida, who has rejected Ismen's marriage proposal, to sow dissention in the enemy camp. She at first refuses, but when Ismen uses his magic to show her the enemy camp she recognizes Rinald as the knight she has just dreamed of and agrees to undertake the mission.

Armida arrives in the crusaders' camp and meets Rinald, who brings her into the council where she tells them that an uncle has blinded the king, usurped the throne, and chased her into the desert. Rinald urges the Franks to come to her aid at once and proposes he lead the effort. Bohumir, leader of the Franks, prays for guidance and decides they should support Armida, but he will arrange for lots to be drawn to select the expedition's commander. Rinald, too impatient to wait, leaves the camp with Armida. They are caught leaving the Frankish camp by the hermit Peter, but the lovers are aided in their escape by Ismen, who drives a chariot pulled by dragons.

Rinald and Armida are entertained in her garden by sirens and fairies. Ismen disguised as an old man tries to destroy the palace. When he finds his powers no match for Armida's sorcery, he goes to Rinald's companions and claims to be a convert to their Christian faith. Glad to have his help, they accept from him the Archangel Michael's diamond shield, which they use to bring Rinald out of the palace. Armida gives way to grief and the palace collapses.

Rinald asks forgiveness for abandoning his comrades and his mission. As the Crusaders advance on Damascus the battle passes through the camp and Rinald kills Ismen and is then confronted by a knight in black. As they battle one another and Rinald curses Armida's name, the knight drops his sword and is stabbed by Rinald, who only then recognizes his opponent is Armida. He baptises her as she dies in his arms.

== Performance history ==
The opera premiered at Prague's National Theatre on 25 March 1904 but was received coolly by both the public and critics. It has been revived there several times, in 1928 conducted by Otakar Ostrčil, 1941 by Václav Talich, 1946, 1948, and in 1987 conducted by Fratisek Vajnar. Other Czech performances include Plzeň in 1925 and 1943, Brno in 1935 and 1994, Olomouc in 1936, Ostrava in 1941, 1991 and 2012, and Liberec in 1968. The first production outside of Czechoslovakia or the Czech Republic, in Bremen in 1961, included Montserrat Caballé in the cast.

In 2022, a production shared with Plzeň was presented at Wexford Festival Opera. The opera was revived in May 2023 at the Prague National Theatre.

A recording made on 22 May 1995 in the Rudolfinum, Prague was issued by Orfeo as C 404 962, with Joanna Borowska (Armida), Wiesłav Ochman (Rinald), Pavel Daniluk (Hidraot), George Fortune (Ismen), Vratislav Kříž (Bohumír), the Czech Philharmonic Orchestra and Prague Chamber Choir conducted by Gerd Albrecht

== Instrumentation ==
The opera is scored for 1 piccolo, 2 flutes, 2 oboes, 1 English horn, 3 clarinets, 2 bassoons, 1 contrabassoon, 4 horns, 4 trumpets (including 2 off-stage), 3 trombones, 1 tuba, timpani, bass drum, cymbals, triangle, harp, and strings.
