= Adolf Krössing =

Czech actor, opera singer and director

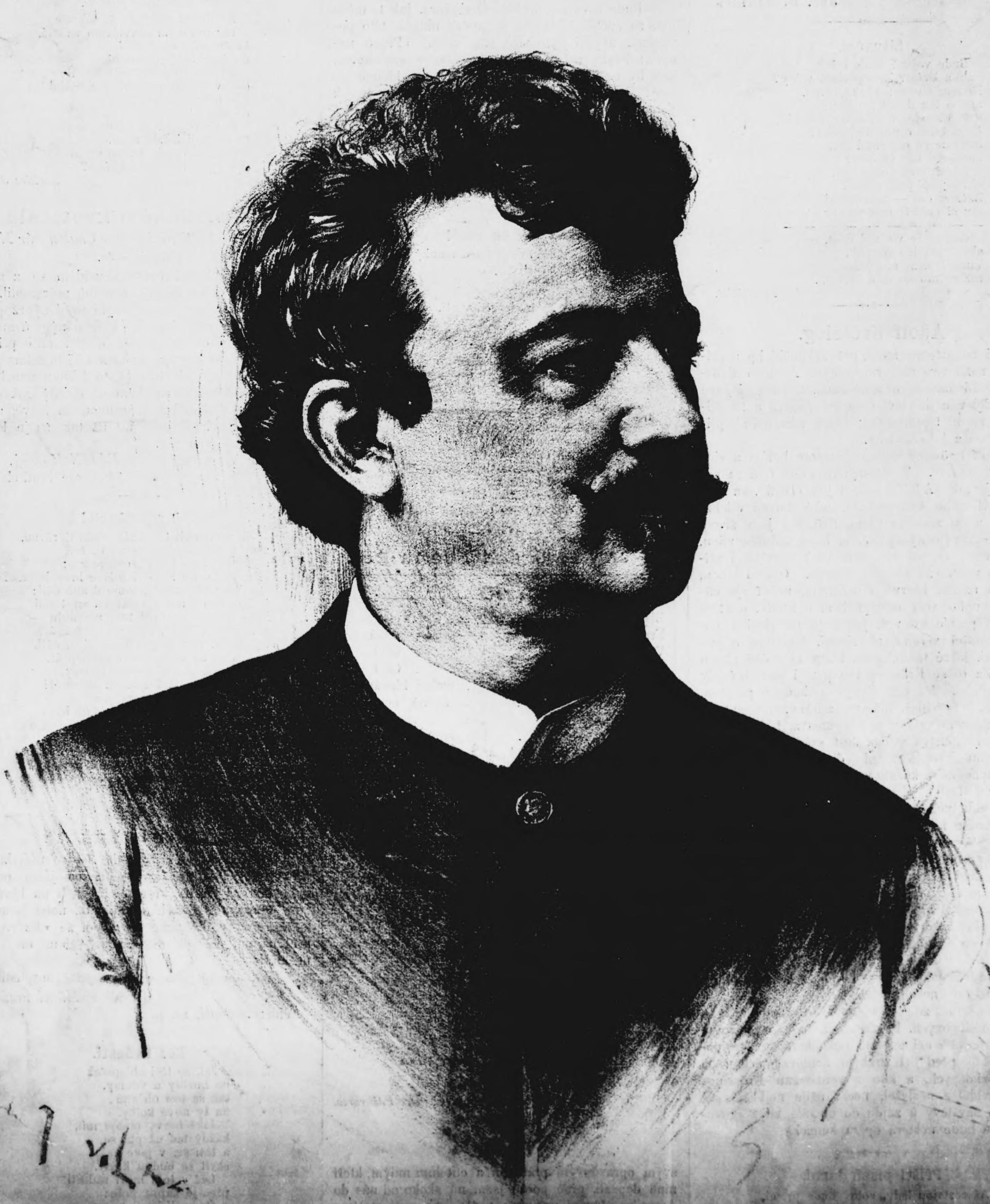
- Portrait of Adolf Krössing, published in 1888
- Born: 5 January 1848; Prague, Austrian Empire
- Died: 28 January 1933 (aged 85); Prague, Czechoslovakia
- Occupation(s): Singer, actor, director

Adolf Krössing (5 January 1848 – 28 January 1933) was a German Bohemian operatic tenor, stage director, and actor of both the stage and film. Possessing a smaller voice, Krössing impressed audiences not with his vocal prowess but with his dramatic gifts. A master of improvisation and comic timing, he excelled in character roles. He is particularly remembered for creating roles in several world premieres by Bedřich Smetana and Antonín Dvořák.

== Biography ==
Krössing was born in Prague, the son of a German father and a French mother. He was brought up in an entirely German environment, being schooled by German tutors and speaking primarily German at home. His father wanted Krössing to become a lawyer, but his own proclivities lay towards the theatre. Under the advice of a friend, he began taking singing lessons with František Vogl in Prague. Shortly thereafter he began appearing in stage plays in that city.

Krössing made his first singing appearances in concerts at the Plzeň Theatre. His performances attracted the attention of František Saak, the director of the Provisional Theatre in Prague. Saak offered him an opera contract and in December 1870 Krössing made his professional opera debut in Gaetano Donizetti's Lucrezia Borgia. In September of that same year he played Wenzel in the premiere of the final version of Bedřich Smetana's opera The Bartered Bride, a role which he would repeat often throughout his career. His portrayal in this production impressed Smetana, and Krössing was soon invited to join his group of artists that would later be established at the Prague National Theatre.

Krössing performed with Smetana's group of artists at the Nové české divadlo (New Czech Theatre) up until 1881 when the National Theatre opened. He continued to appear at that house in operas, operettas, plays, and even the occasional ballet up until 1914. While there he portrayed over 300 roles, both large and small, in well over 4,000 performances. He was also active as a stage director for plays and operas at the theatre from 1890 until his retirement.

Krössing notably appeared in several world premieres during his career. He sang in two premieres of operas by Smetana, singing Skřivánek in The Secret (1878) and Michǎlek in The Devil's Wall (1882). He also sang in the premiers of five operas by Antonín Dvořák; the roles of Jean in The Cunning Peasant (1878), Toník in The Stubborn Lovers (1881), Benda in The Jacobin (1889), the Gamekeeper in Rusalka (1901), and Sven in Armida (1904). He also portrayed the role of Adam Ecl in the first production of Karel Kovařovic's The Dogheads on 24 April 1898.

In his advanced age, Krössing performed in five Czech silent films. His first role was of one of his signature stage roles, Wenzel in The Bartered Bride, for a silent film version of the opera. He also worked as a voice teacher both during his opera career and after. His most famous pupil was soprano Růžena Maturová. By his early 80s, Krössing was seriously ill with a severe case of diabetes. The disease caused his death in 1933 at the age of 85. He is buried at the Vyšehrad Cemetery in Prague.

== Filmography ==
- Prodaná nevěsta (The Bartered Bride), 1913 – Vašek
- Legionář, 1920 – Count Otto Rosenberk
- Píseň života (Song of Life), 1924 – Conrad the beggar
- Vdavky Nanynky Kulichovy, 1925 – the role of neuvedena
- Svéhlavička, 1926 – gardener

== Recordings ==
Krössing made a number of recordings of opera arias between 1906 and 1907 on the Gramophone record. He recorded selections from Les Huguenots, Eugene Onegin, and The Bartered Bride.
