= Betty Fibichová =

Czech opera singer (1846–1901)

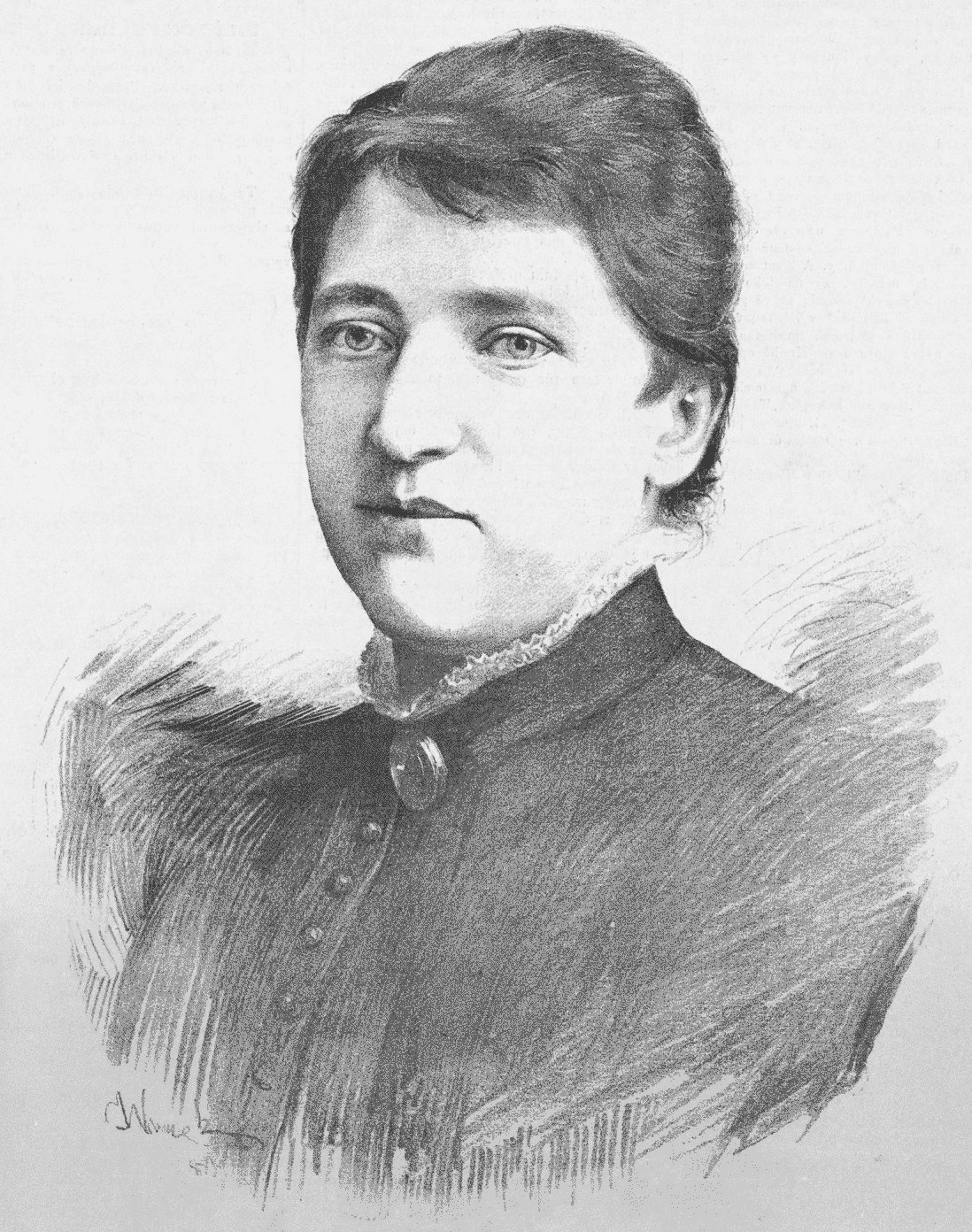
Portrait of Betty Fibichová that was first published on 1 November 1884.

Betty Fibichová (16 March 1846 – 20 May 1901) was a Czech opera singer and the wife of composer Zdeněk Fibich. The greatest Czech operatic contralto of her day, she enjoyed close artistic partnerships with both Antonín Dvořák and Bedřich Smetana in addition to collaborating frequently with her husband.

== Biography ==
Born Betty Hanušová in Jilemnice, Fibichová made her professional opera debut at the Provisional Theatre in 1868. Later that year Bedřich Smetana became her artistic manager, and she became highly involved with his group of artists that would later be established at the Prague National Theatre. She notably sang at the opening of the theatre on 11 June 1881 as Radmilla in the world premiere of Smetana's Libuše; a performance given in honor of the visit of Crown Prince Rudolf of Austria. A fire broke in the new theatre on the following 12 August 1881 which destroyed the copper dome, the auditorium and stage of the theatre. The theatre was repaired and reopened on 18 November 1883 with a reprisal of Libuše with the same cast.

Fibichová sang in two more premieres of operas by Smetana at the New Czech Theatre during her career. On 18 September 1878 she portrayed Panna Roza in the world premiere of The Secret at the Nové České Divadlo (New Czech Theatre). She then appeared as Záviš in the first production of The Devil's Wall on 29 October 1882. Fibichová also sang in a number of world premieres of works by Antonín Dvořák. On 17 April 1876 she sang the role of Homena in the premiere of Vanda. She sang the role of Veruna in the first performance of The Cunning Peasant in Prague in 1878. On 2 October 1881 she starred as Říhová in the first production of The Stubborn Lovers. In 1887 she portrayed Anna in the first performance of the revised version of King and Charcoal Burner, a role she had previously sung in the work's premiere on 24 November 1874.

In 1875 Fibichová married Zdeněk Fibich who, while less known than Dvořák or Smetana, was one of the greatest Czech composers of the day. She sang in the premieres of a number of operas by her husband, most notably Isabella in The Bride of Messina in Prague on 28 March 1884. Other roles she originated for her husband were Eliška in Bukovín and Perchta in Blaník. The couple separated in 1895, after which point Fibich lived with his lover and frequent artistic collaborator, librettist Anežka Schulzová.

Fibichová also sang works from the French, Italian, German, and Russian opera repertories during her career. She was also an active concert soloist. She retired from the stage in 1900, the same year that her husband died. She died in Prague in May the following year at the age of 55.
