= Václav Zítek =

Czech opera singer (1932–2011)

Václav Zítek (24 March 1932 – 18 December 2011) was a Czech opera singer. A lyric baritone with a beautiful timbre and a wide vocal range, he was one of the leading Czech singers of the postwar generation. He particularly excelled in portraying Janáček and Smetana heroes. His voice is preserved on numerous opera recordings made with the Supraphon record label.

== Biography ==
Born in Tisá, Zítek studied singing privately with E. Matoušková, M. Linka, D. Levytský, and Zdeněk Otava. Between 1955 and 1959, he worked on the staff at the National Theatre in Prague and sang in some smaller roles. In 1959–1960, he worked as a principal artist at the Zdeněk Nejedlý Theatre in Ostrava. He then was a leading baritone at the opera house in Ústí nad Labem from 1960 to 1969. While there he also appeared occasionally as a guest artist at the Prague National Theatre. He eventually left Ústí nad Labem for that house, singing as a leading baritone at the National Theatre from 1969 through 1991.

Among Zítek's signature roles are several parts in operas by Bedřich Smetana, including Kalina in The Secret, Tomeš in The Kiss, Vladislav in Dalibor, Lord Vok in The Devil's Wall, and Přemysl in Libuše; the latter of which he sang for the reopening of the Prague National Theater in 1983. He is also known for the role of Prince Vasilij Šujský in Antonín Dvořák's Dimitrij and for several Janáček heroes, including Stárek in Jenůfa, Forester in The Cunning Little Vixen, and Baron Jaroslav Prus in The Makropulos Affair. His recording of the role of Alexandr Petrovič Gorjančikov in Janáček's From the House of the Dead won the Grammy Award for Best Opera Recording in 1982. Other roles in his repertory include Count Almaviva in The Marriage of Figaro, the title role in Don Giovanni, Escamillo in Carmen, and the title hero in Eugene Onegin.

Zítek's appearances on the international stage include performances at the Bolshoi Theatre, the Grand Théâtre de Bordeaux, the Romanian National Opera, Bucharest, and at the State Opera, Deutsche Oper, and Komische Oper in Berlin. In 1988 he had a major triumph singing Alexandr Petrovič Gorjančikov with the Opéra National de Paris. In 1985 Zítek was made a People's Artist of the ČSSR. In 2007 he was honored with a Thalia Award. He died in Prague, aged 79.
