= The Kiss (opera) =

Opera by Bedřich Smetana

- Opera by Bedřich Smetana
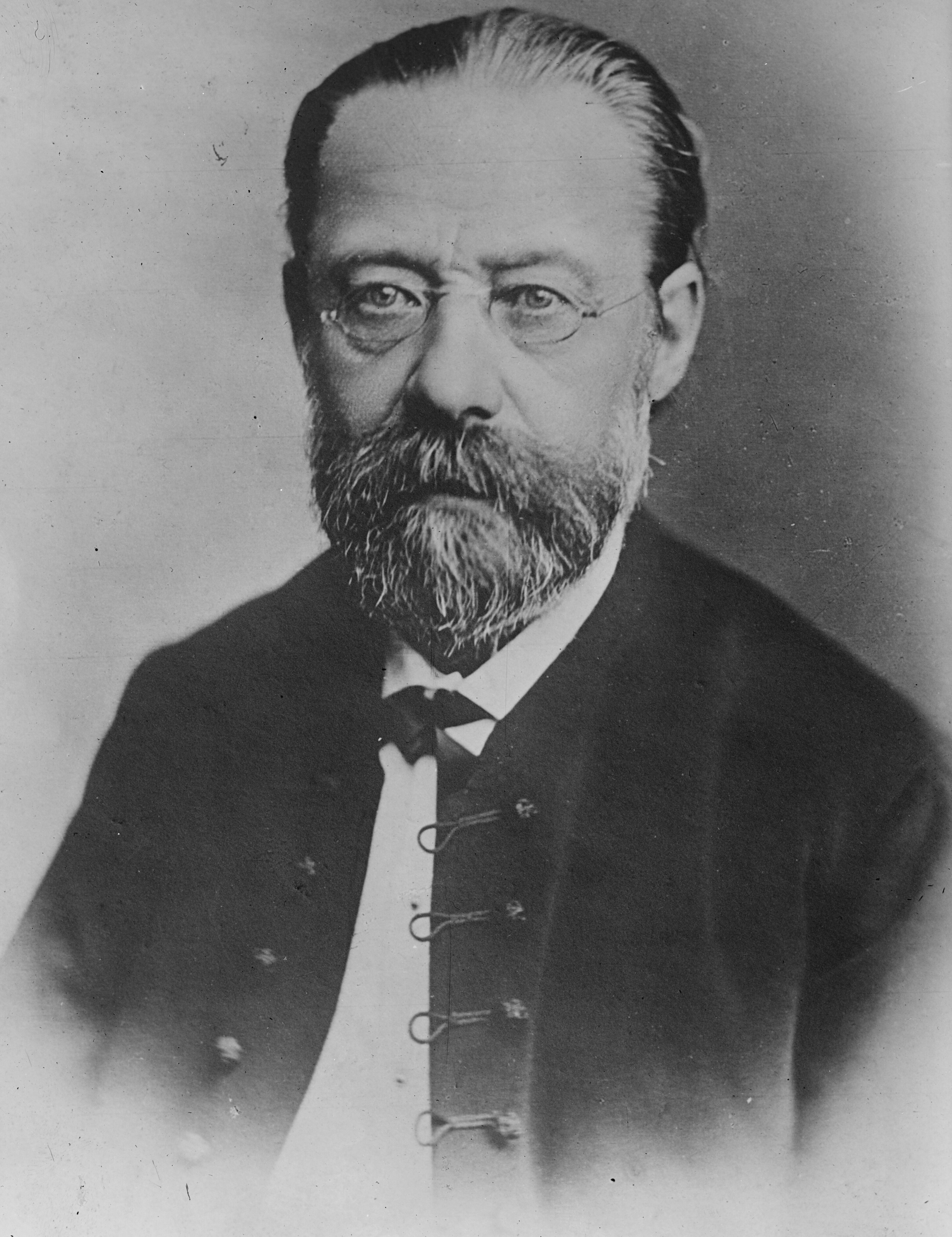
- The composer before 1880
- Native title: Hubička
- Librettist: Eliška Krásnohorská
- Language: Czech
- Based on: novel by Karolina Světlá
- Premiere: 7 November 1876; Provisional Theatre, Prague

The Kiss (Czech: Hubička) is an opera in two acts, with music by Bedřich Smetana and text by Eliška Krásnohorská, based on a novel by Karolina Světlá. It received its first performance at the Provisional Theatre in Prague on 7 November 1876.

== Roles ==
| Role | Voice type | Premiere Cast, 7 November 1876 (Conductor: Adolf Čech) |
|---|---|---|
| Paloucký, a peasant | bass-baritone | Karel Čech |
| Vendulka, his daughter | soprano | Marie Sittová |
| Lukáš, a young widower | tenor | Antonín Vávra |
| Tomeš, brother-in-law of Lukáš | baritone | Josef Lev |
| Martinka, Vendulka's old aunt | contralto | Marie Cachová |
| Matouš, an old smuggler | bass | František Mareš |
| Barče, a servant girl | soprano | Marie Laušmanová |
| A frontier guard | tenor | Jan Šára |
Chorus: Neighbours, Musicians, Smugglers.

== Synopsis ==
=== Act 1 ===
Lukáš, a peasant, has always been in love with Vendulka. Unfortunately for the young couple, his parents insisted that he marry another girl. However, his wife dies, leaving him with an infant. As they are both still young, Lukáš intends to woo the very eligible Vendulka.

Paloucký, Vendulka's father, opposes the match: he reasons that since both Lukáš and Vendulka are stubborn people, they would make an incompatible couple. Vendulka is dismayed at his position, so Paloucký withdraws his objection, but his misgivings remain.

With friends and relatives in his wake, Lukáš arrives at Paloucký's home to formally make his intentions towards Vendulka known. Paloucký gives his blessing to the couple with a certain amount of reticence, which annoys Lukáš. The young widower means to kiss Vendulka, she evades it, and, as Paloucký predicted, the couple are already arguing. Only a well-timed drinking song from one of Lukáš's kinsmen can stop the fight.

When Lukáš and Vendulka are alone, he tries to kiss her again, but again he is rebuffed. It is near sundown and Vendulka spreads sand to see the tracks of Lukáš' wife's ghost, visiting her child. Vendulka believes that kissing Lukáš before the wedding would disturb his wife's ghost, who watches over her child. Vendulka refuses to kiss him until they are married. When he insists, she threatens to throw him out of the house. Incensed, he leaves.

Later, after falling asleep, Vendulka is awakened by the sound of a polka outside Paloucký's home. It is Lukáš, dancing with and kissing the village girls. Vendulka is both enraged and mortified, and swears to leave home.

=== Act 2 ===
Lark Song
Barče's Lark Song from Act II of the opera; singer Bronislava Tomanova, piano Veronika Ptackova

In a forest near the Bohemian frontier, a band of smugglers lies in waiting. Lukáš, regretting his previous behavior, mourns the disappearance of Vendulka. Tomeš, Lukáš's brother-in-law, tells him to apologize: he notes that while Vendulka is swift to anger, she is also swift to forgive. When they go off, the smugglers indicate that they have overheard, and they laugh at Lukáš's plight. They are waiting to meet Vendulka's aunt, Martinka, who does business with the smugglers.

Martinka arrives with Vendulka, who is profoundly unhappy. The smugglers, however, like the audience, know that it will all turn out well in the end. After the smugglers leave, Martinka does her best to persuade Vendulka to return home.

The next morning, Lukáš arrives at Martinka's cottage, with his friends and relatives. He apologizes to Paloucký for his actions towards his daughter, and awaits Vendulka. When she arrives, both are overjoyed. She goes towards him, but first he publicly begs forgiveness before they finally kiss.

== Recordings ==
- Pro Arte 3PAL-3005 (US issue): Eduard Haken, Eva Děpoltová, Leo Marian Vodička, Václav Zítek, Libuše Márová, Karel Hanus, Božena Effenberková, Zdeněk Jankovský; Brno Janáček Opera Orchestra and Chorus; František Vajnar (conductor)
- Supraphon / Rediffusion Heritage Collection HCNL 8006: Ludmila Červinková, Marta Krásová, Beno Blachut, Přemysl Kočí, Karel Kalaš, Soloists, Prague National Theatre, Zdeněk Chalabala (conductor) 1953, reissued 1977
