= King and Charcoal Burner =

1874 comic opera by Antonín Dvořák

- Comic opera by Antonín Dvořák
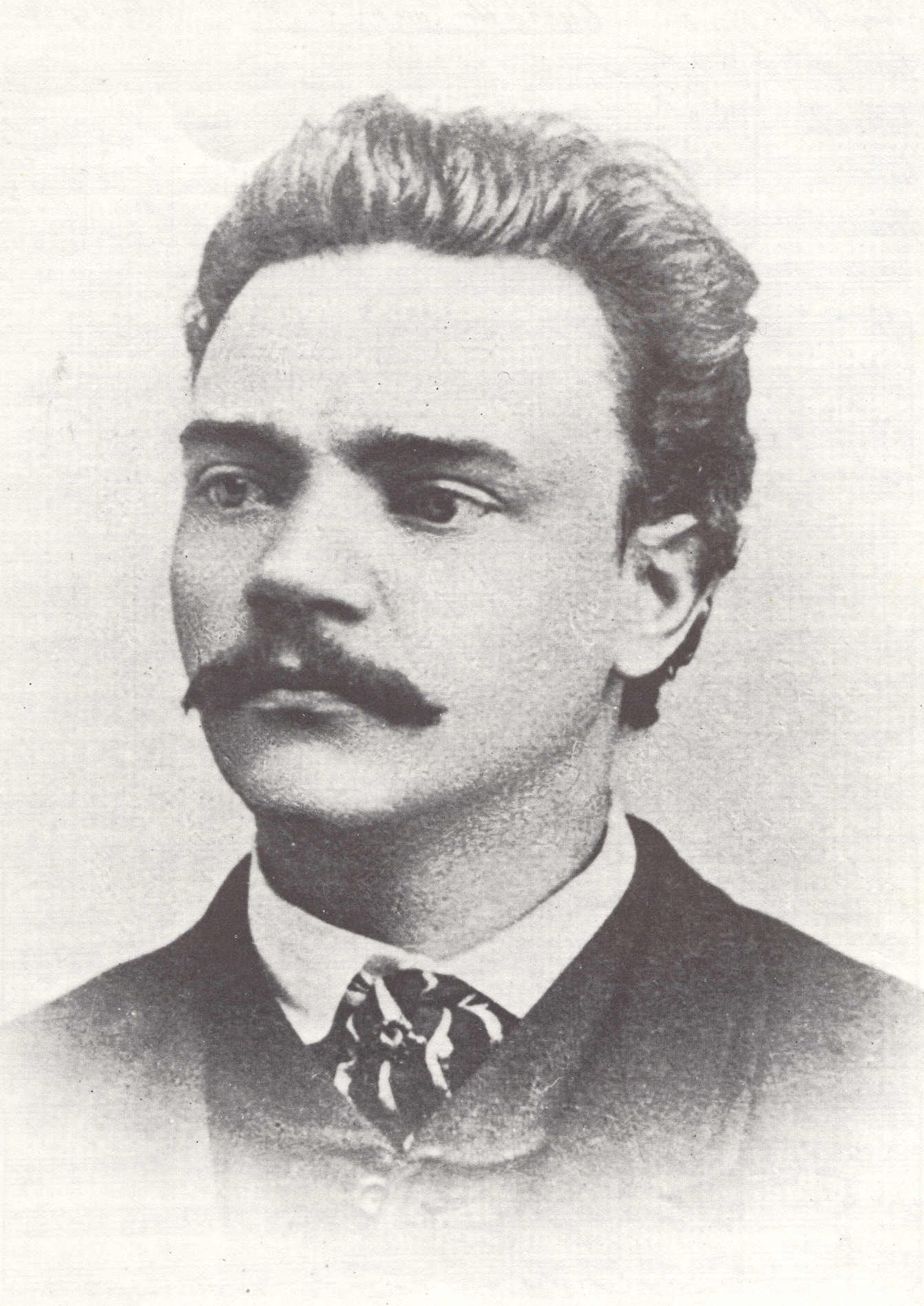
- Antonín Dvořák in 1868
- Librettist: Bernard J. Lobeský
- Language: Czech
- Premiere: 24 November 1874; Provisional Theatre, Prague

King and Charcoal Burner (Czech: Král a uhlíř; sometimes translated as "King and Collier"), Op. 14 (B. 21, revised under B. 151), is a Czech comic opera in three acts, divided into 23 scenes, with music by Antonín Dvořák.

== History ==
Dvořák composed the music for the first version of the opera in 1871 to a libretto by Bernard J. Lobeský (pseudonym of Bernard Guldener). In 1871, Dvořák offered the finished opera to the Czech Provisional Theatre in Prague. Bedřich Smetana, then in charge of the company, returned the work to Dvořák, claiming that it was unperformable.

Dvořák subsequently wrote entirely new music to the same libretto, without using any of the original material. He completed this new version in 1874. The Provisional Theatre, under different artistic leadership after the departure of Smetana, gave the première on 24 November 1874. The opera received a good critical and audience reception, but was withdrawn after four performances. Dvořák made another substantial revision in 1887, with modifications to the libretto by Václav Juda Novotný. This version received its premiere on 15 June 1887, conducted by Mořic Anger.

In 1914, Karel Kovařovic produced a heavily reworked and cut edition of Dvořák's 1887 version. This version was staged in 1915 and in 1956. This edition forms the basis of most currently available recordings.

In 1916, the manuscript score of Acts I and III was found in the estate of Josef Aupěka. In 1928, other materials for the original performance were found in the archives of the National Theatre, Prague. From these materials, the first version was reconstructed. On 28 May 1929, this first version was first performed, in an abridged form, at the National Theatre, Prague, under the baton of Otakar Ostrčil and directed by Ferdinand Pujman, for a run of six performances. The most recent performance of the original 1871 version, and the first known performance in recent times, was a concert performance in September 2019 at the Dvořák Prague International Music Festival.

== Roles ==
Role	Voice type	Premiere cast, 24 November 1874 (Conductor: Adolf Čech)
King Matyáš	baritone	Josef Lev
Jindřich, Burgrave of Křivoklát	tenor	Jan Šára
Matěj, coal-burner in the Křivoklát forests	bass	Karel Čech
Anna, his wife	contralto	Betty Hanušová (later Fibichová)
Liduška, his daughter	soprano	Marie Zofie Sittová
Jeník, young charcoal burner	tenor	Antonín Vávra
Eva	soprano	Ema Maislerová-Sáková
First knight	tenor	
Second knight	bass	

== Synopsis ==
The theme of the opera is from old legend of the rescue of a Czech ruler (probably prince Jaromír of Bohemia of the Přemyslid dynasty, or his brother Oldřich of Bohemia) who gets lost in the woods of Křivoklát. One of the main characters – the charcoal burner Matěj – was taken by Lobeský from the puppet theatre play Feast Day in Hudlice (based on the same theme). Lobeský also replaced the Přemyslid king with the Habsburg Emperor Matthias (and thus shifted the action from the 11th to the 17th century). As Matěj is the familiar form of Matthias in Czech, Dvořák gained two characters with the same names – one poor, one rich. The king mingles incognito among the common folk (a frequently recurring theme in Czech culture of that time), so the plot is based on the merging of the worlds of the aristocracy and the common folk.

Act 1 (original version)
During a hunt, the burgrave Jindřich arrives and asks about the king, who has not yet returned. At Henry's instruction, the hunters set out to look for the king.

At the hut where the coal miner Matěj lives with his wife Anna and daughter Liduška, the young coal miner Jeník asks to meet Liduška. Liduška reciprocates Jeník's love, but whilst her parents like Jeník, they consider Jeník too poor to be an acceptable suitor. Other coal miners then escort to Matějs hut an unknown nobleman lost in the forest. Matěj offers the nobleman a meal, which he gratefully accepts. The nobleman, secretly the king with his identity concealed, introduces himself as Matyáš, and explains that he lost his way during that day's hunt with the king. At the sound of bagpipes in the distance, the coal miners bring the bagpiper to the table at the nobleman's request. The crowd celebrate in song and dance.

Act 2 (original version)
At dawn, the nobleman is already awake. He sees Liduška sneaking into a secret meeting with Jeník. The nobleman surprises her, and admits his platonic affection for her, with a kiss. Jeník arrives, and in a moment of jealousy, he threatens the nobleman. The other coal miners restrain Jeník. The nobleman and Liduška explain themselves, but Jeník is not satisfied. The royal hunting party, led by Jindřich, arrives, and recognises the king, who forbids them to reveal his identity. The nobleman thanks Matěj and Anna for his hospitality, and invites them to visit him in Prague. As the hunting party prepares to depart, Jeník is still indignant. Matěj and Anna cannot calm Jeník down, and Jeník decides to go to war.

Act 3 (original version)
At the hall of Prague Castle, the court company dances. Only Eva is unhappy. Jindřich returns and greets Eva passionately. The king and queen are coming. The king encourages the gathering to enjoy themselves, and mentions a prank: today Matěj, Anna and Liduška have traveled to Prague for this ceremony, and the king had them arrested at the gate, and has them brought in, blindfolded, before the throne. Still masquerading as Matyáš, the king accuses them of harboring a fugitive from the army. Finally, the blindfolds are removed. Matyáš invites them to a feast, but Matěj asks for acknowledgement directly from the "host", a request with which the queen will comply. The king asks Liduška about Jeník, but he is with the army and did not show up in his native village. Jindřich and Eva ask the king for permission to marry, but the king prevents this, because he wishes to treat Eva like a daughter.

The handcuffed Jeník is brought before the king. At first, Jeník was an exemplary soldier and earned a promotion, but recently tried to desert the army. The intention is to punish him by marrying him off against his will. Jeník rebels because he does not want to betray Liduška, until he finds out that Liduška is the intended bride. Both lovers, and Matěj and Anna, are satisfied. However, Matěj is uncomfortable in the ostentatious environment, but Matyáš encourages him to be a guest with him, just as he was a guest with Matěj. During the festivities, Matěj asks additionally for the blessing of the marriage of Jindřich and Eva, in addition to the blessing of the marriage between Liduška and Jeník. The king is displeased, but the queen soothes him, and the company reminds him of his word. Matěj then threatens to leave, in reaction to the luxury that he sees. After Matyáš finally relents, the coal miner's family finally understands that Matyáš is the king. They are afraid that they have offended the king, but the king thanks them for the lessons that they have taught him. Everyone praises the king's wisdom.

Act 3 (1887 version)
In the hall at Prague Castle, the courtiers dance a gavotte. Jeník, now a military officer with exemplary war service, is present, but does not take part in the dance, troubled by memories of Liduška. Jindřich comforts him and reminds him of the king's favour, stating that today, at a ceremony for the King, Matěj and his family are invited to the court. The king joins the company and prepares those present for a prank, where he has the coal miner and his family arrested and charged with treason. The king hides himself and the guards escort in Matěj and Anna. The "court" accuses Matěj and Anna of a conspiracy against a foreigner who barely escaped an armed attack during his stay at the coal mine. Matěj tries to explain, and Anna answers the judges' questions honestly. Liduška remains silent, until the court declares Jeník the main culprit and condemns him to death in absentia, after which she speaks in his defence. Jeník realises her love for him, and embraces her. King Matěj then emerges to greet the assembly. Matěj, Liduška and Anna admire the beauty of the feast, and the king invites them to dance and then to the table. Matěj still demands compensation from his host for the kiss that Matyáš imprinted on Liduška. The coal miner's family understands now that their then guest was the king himself. Liduška and Jeník sing of their happiness, and the company sings its praise to the benevolent king.

== Recordings ==
(All of the 1887 version, edited by Karel Kovařovic, unless stated)

1948: (Radio, unreleased). (King Matyáš) Bořek Rujan, (Matěj) Karel Kalaš, (Anna) Ludmila Hanzalíková, (Jindřich) Oldřich Kovář, (Liduška) Štefa Petrová, (Jeník) Antonín Votava, (1st Knight) Bohuš Holubář, (2nd Knight) Jan Soumar. Prague Radio Symphony Orchestra and Chorus, c. František Dyk

1960: (Radio, Amazon.co.uk download only). (King Matyáš) Jindřich Jindrák, (Matěj) Eduard Haken, (Anna) Ivana Mixová, (Jindřich) Milan Karpíšek, (Liduška) Libuše Domanínská, (Jeník) Oldřich Spisar, (1st Knight) Jiří Joran, (2nd Knight) Rudolf Vonásek. Prague Radio Symphony Orchestra and Chorus, c. František Dyk

2005: (Orfeo C 678 062 H). (King Matyáš) Dalibor Jenis, (Matěj) Peter Mikuláš, (Liduška) Lívia Ághová, (Anna) Michelle Breedt, (Jeník) Michal Lehotsky, (Jindřich) Markus Schäfer. WDR Sinfonieorchester Köln, WDR Rundfunkchor Köln, Prague Chamber Choir, c. Gerd Albrecht.

1989: (Highlights – released 1996, Supraphon SU 3078-2 611). (King Matyáš) René Tuček, (Matěj) Dalibor Jedlička, (Anna) Drahomíra Drobková, (Jindřich) Viktor Kočí, (Liduška) Jitka Svobodová, (Jeník) Miroslav Kopp, (1st Knight) Štěpán Buršík, (2nd Knight) Jaroslav Prodělal. Prague National Theatre Orchestra and Chorus, c. Josef Chaloupka. (from 1989 television production)

1951: "Here am I, a lover waiting" (Anna's aria, Act 2). Maria Tauberová. CD release 2015 on Prague Radioservis 2-CD "Czech Romantic Opera" (CR0782-2).

2019: concert performance of original 1871 version at Dvořák Prague International Music Festival, extracts on Radio Prague Web site.

== Sources ==
- Burghauser, Jarmil: Antonín Dvořák. Prague: Koniasch Latin Press, 2006. ISBN 80-86791-26-2
- The New Grove Dictionary of Opera (Stanley Sadie ed.), 1992, p. 992. ISBN 0-935859-92-6
- Tyrrell, John, 1988, Czech Opera, Cambridge University Press, pp. 81–82. ISBN 0-521-23531-6
