= The Secret (opera) =

Opera by Bedřich Smetana

- Opera by Bedřich Smetana
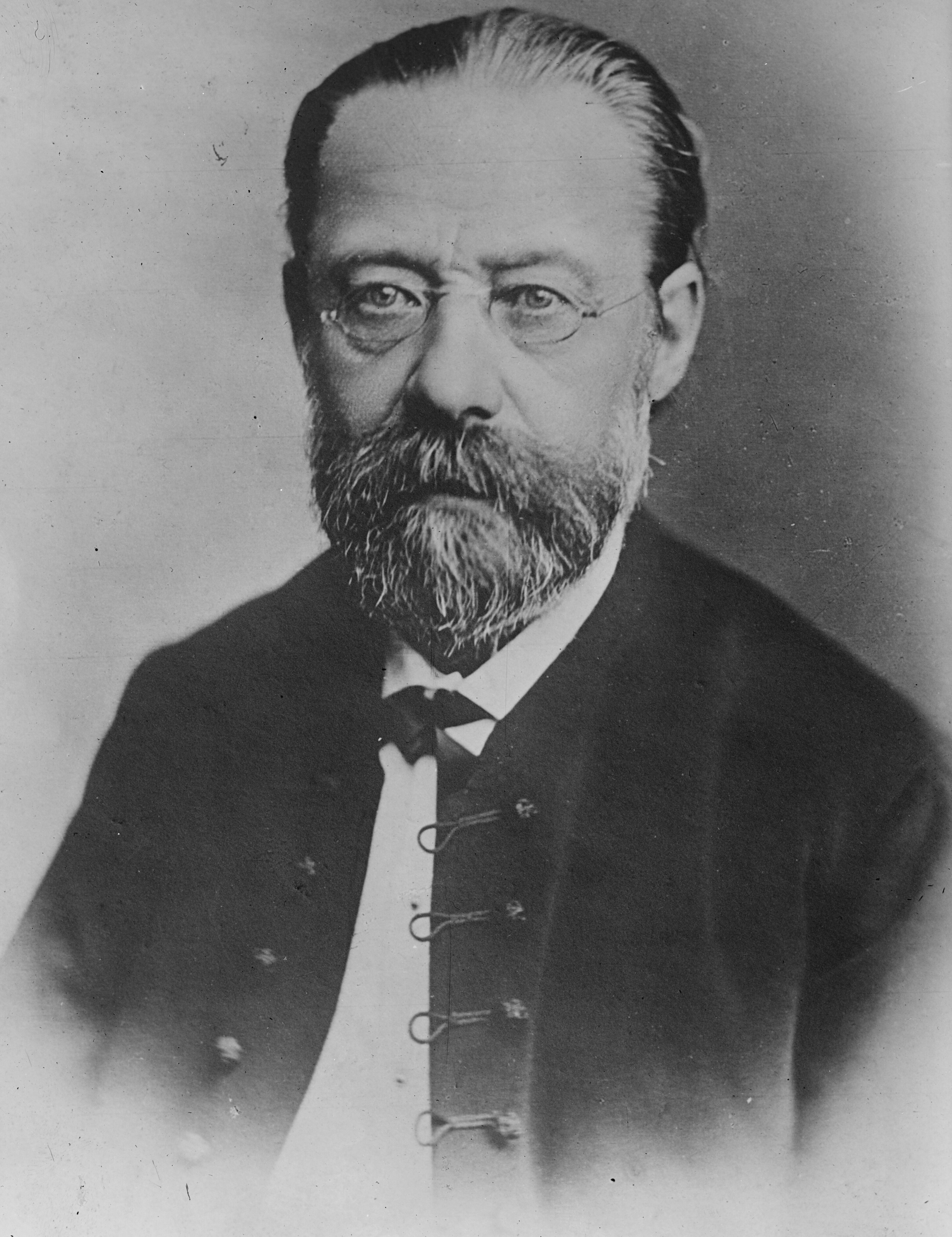
- The composer before 1880
- Native title: Tajemství
- Librettist: Eliška Krásnohorská
- Language: Czech
- Premiere: 7 November 1878; Nové České Divadlo, Prague

The Secret (Czech: Tajemství) is a comic opera in three acts by Bedřich Smetana. The libretto was written by Eliška Krásnohorská. The premiere took place on 18 September 1878 at the Nové České Divadlo (New Czech Theatre) in Prague.

== Background ==
Krásnohorská proposed the idea for a new opera to Smetana two weeks after the opening of The Kiss, but kept details of the plot a secret from the composer until July 1877, when a draft outline, drawing on several sources, including Les femmes et le secret by La Fontaine, was sent to him. The librettist had set the action in the town of Bělá pod Bezdězem, visible from Smetana's home in the country. Fighting his increasing deafness and resultant depression, Smetana made a few small changes to Krásnohorská's original draft and delivered a full score to the New Czech Theatre on 4 August 1877, for the premiere in September. The through composition evident in The Brandenburgers in Bohemia and Libuše is absent; a pot-pourri overture prefaces a sequence of choruses, duets, arias and ensemble pieces, but the characters are portrayed with more feeling and drawn from life, rather than the more stock characters of The Bartered Bride and The Two Widows.

== Performance history ==
The opera was not as successful as Smetana had hoped; after its opening run, it was seen only a dozen more times during his lifetime and was unperformed for twenty years after that. In 1922 it came back into the repertory of the Prague National Theatre. It has been in the repertoire in the Czech capital ever since, under conductors such as Jaroslav Vogel, Václav Talich, Jaroslav Krombholc and Zdeněk Košler and many eminent Czech singers among the principals.

The UK premiere was in Oxford in December 1956 under Jack Westrup, and it was performed at the Camden Festival in 1972 under Vilém Tauský.

== Roles ==
Role	Voice type	Premiere Cast, 18 September 1878 (Conductor: Adolf Čech)
Blaženka, Malina's daughter	soprano	Marie Zofie Sittová
Bonifác, veteran soldier	bass	František Mareš
Vít, a huntsman, Kalina's son	tenor	Antonín Vávra
Kalina, a councillor	baritone	Josef Lev
Panna Róza, Malina's sister	contralto	Betty Fibichová
Malina, a councillor	bass	Karel Čech
Skřivánek, a singer	tenor	Adolf Krössing
Jirka, a bell-ringer	tenor	Jan Sára
The Ghost of Barnabáš	bass	Ferdinand Koubek
An entrepreneur	baritone	Leopold Stropnický
The innkeeper	soprano	Märzová
Chorus: Councillors, neighbours, boys and girls, threshers, bricklayers, shadows and apparitions, bagpipers.

== Synopsis ==
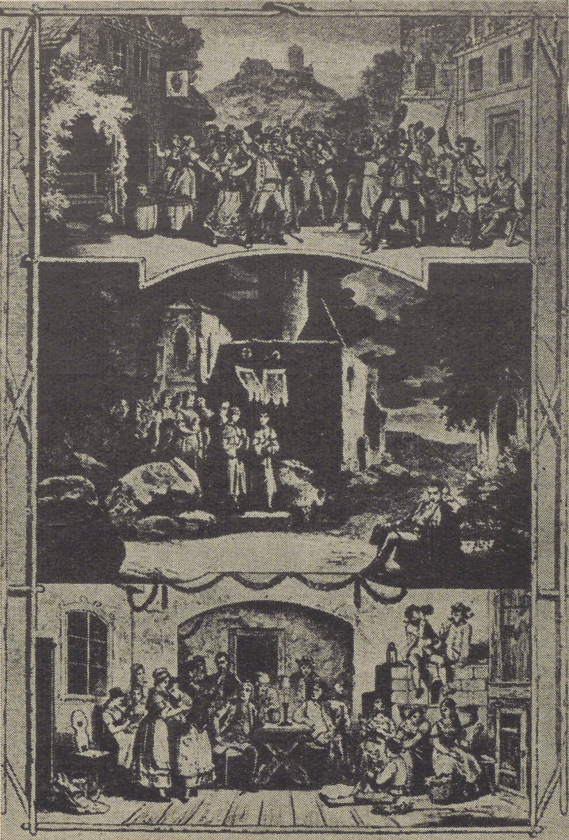
Images from the premiere in 1878. Scene by H. Ullik, drawing by Antonín Gareis (Světozor, 1878)

Act I:

In the town square of Bělá, the followers of two rival councillors, Kalina and Malina, are praising their respective champion. Bonifác, an ex-serviceman in Kalina’s household, is wooing Madame Róza Malinova, and through their dialogue we learn that twenty years earlier, the then-poor Kalina had asked for the hand of Róza, sister of Malina, but her parents forbade the marriage because of Kalina’s relative poverty. Kalina then married another relatively poor woman, while Róza never married. Kalina is now a widower and has had a house built for himself across the town square from the Malina's. Kalina and Róza meet each other in the square and, in front of the townspeople, bicker. Malina and Kalina, egged on by their supporters, start to trade insults and curry favour by plying the old ballad singer Skřivánek with beer. Trying to keep both men happy with a song that ends up describing Róza’s and Kalina’s plight, Malina is moved by the song and proposes that he and Kalina bury their animosity and he offers Kalina a little financial help so that he and Róza may marry. But Kalina is stung by the implication that he is still poor (though he does indeed owe the builders of his new house a substantial sum) and Róza now reveals why she is so cold towards Kalina – it is because the now-deceased Father Barnabáš had told her that Kalina had a secret that would have allowed him to become rich and thereby win Róza’s hand, had he wanted. Clearly, Róza surmises, his protestations of love for her all those years ago were all lies. When a bagpiper strikes up a tune and the opportunist Bonifác plucks a flower and presents it to Róza as an invitation to dance with him, Kalina threatens the piper who drops his bagpipes and flees while the two rival bands of supporters start to brawl with each other. They are interrupted by Kalina’s son Vít and Malina’s daughter Blaženka, who calm the councillors down. We realize that Vít and Blaženka have become lovers, despite the animosity between their two families. Bonifác returns carrying a wooden baton which he had pulled from a window frame to use as a makeshift weapon. In the melée the baton has snapped and Bonifác has found inside it a yellowed piece of paper. He gives it to Kalina to read. It is the secret that Friar Barnabáš told to Róza – a map that will take Kalina to hidden treasure. Kalina makes Bonifác and Vít swear to keep the secret, but while Kalina and Vít discuss the content of the map inside Kalina’s house, the bricklayer comes to ask for payment from Kalina. Don’t worry, Bonifác assures him, Kalina will soon be very rich for – and they must solemnly swear to keep this a secret – Kalina has discovered Barnabáš’s message. The bricklayer heads straight for the tavern and tells the innkeeper not to whisper a word to anyone but... They are overheard by the bellringer Jirka, who swears solemnly not to breathe a word about the secret, and he heads off to the church. It is now late and in the darkness on a bench in the square Vít and Blaženka are enjoying a secret assignation when they hear Jirka who is in the bell tower of the church, bellowing down a speaking trumpet to the ballad singer Skřivánek who is a little hard of hearing: “It is a secret. Now, solemnly swear…”

Act II:

It is early evening on the slopes of Mount Bezdez. A rocky overhang is to one side of the stage, a broken down gate permits entry to a pathway which leads up to the ruined castle and monastery, with the spire of a church also visible. Kalina is lamenting his fate – to be forever working to compensate for his poverty. He pulls from a hidey-hole a lantern, cloak, hoe and spade, then conceals them again and falls asleep. In a dreamlike sequence earth spirits warn that he who seeks treasure will blacken their soul while the ghost of Friar Barnabáš declares that the most precious treasure is a loving woman. Kalina wakes up in a holy terror. A group of bridesmaids heads toward the church and Kalina, looking for spiritual help, follows them. Vít and Blaženka enter the now-deserted spot and pour out their love for each other but they have been observed by Bonifác, who summons Róza, Kalina, Malina, everybody in the town, to witness the couple’s shame. Yet even with threats of being disowned by their fathers, the couple, supported by the townspeople, is defiant and now Róza admonishes the two men for believing that true love cares for worldly goods. Róza blesses Vít and Blaženka for following their hearts, and as the crowd disperses Róza is left alone, lamenting that Kalina did not defy the world as Vít just had, for despite it all, she does still love Kalina. She is disturbed by Bonifác who has come to woo her again and to reveal Kalina’s secret yet Kalina himself returns, having decided he will risk his soul to find the treasure. Retrieving the hoe and spade he levers a rock aside to reveal a tunnel. Bonifác refuses Róza’s request to stop Kalina and she herself rushes forward to stop him but Kalina, to a clap of thunder, jumps down into the tunnel.

Act III:

In the communal kitchen of Malina’s house at hop harvest time, and there is turmoil for Malina is still furious with his daughter for daring to love Vít. Urged by the labourers and Róza she sings a tearful ballad before running off. Malina declares he would be a fool to give his daughter to such a proud man who – the bricklayer can confirm – is in debt. Malina refuses to listen to Róza’s pleadings and vows he will only permit the marriage if Kalina comes to his house and begs him humbly. And now the opportunist Bonifác seizes the moment to tell everyone that Kalina will never ever come to Malina’s house… for he has been lured by the promise of treasure, has disappeared, and the devil most likely has now taken possession of his soul. The news horrifies the audience, more so because they hear an eery scaping and then a clanking originating from behind the black door of the oven. Blaženka returns to the room with Vít who is dressed for a journey. He has come to thank Róza for her blessing and despite being disowned by his father, he declares he will chance his luck in the world but rich or poor he will return in a year and again ask for Blaženka’s hand. Bonifác takes the opportunity to ask Malina to allow Vít and Blaženka to wed, while also pressing his own suit to marry Róza. She coolly tells him she will think it over when they are again startled by sounds coming from inside the oven. Bonifác and Skřivánek are urged to sing to lighten the mood and they strike up a song about Friar Barnabáš but it is interrupted by a furious rattling of the oven door and all except Róza rush out of the room, terrified. The door flies open and coated in dust, the caped Kalina stumbles in. Róza and Kalina together understand now what Barnabáš meant when he marked the location of the treasure Kalina would find. The two fall into each other’s arms, and as Malina, Blaženka, Vít and the townspeople pour back into the room, Kalina does indeed beg Malina on behalf of his son and for himself. Pride set aside, Malina cries “God bless you all, get married!” and the bystanders join in a chorus “You who belong to each other, get married, that’s the secret; nothing else matters – old love will triumph!”

== Selected recordings ==
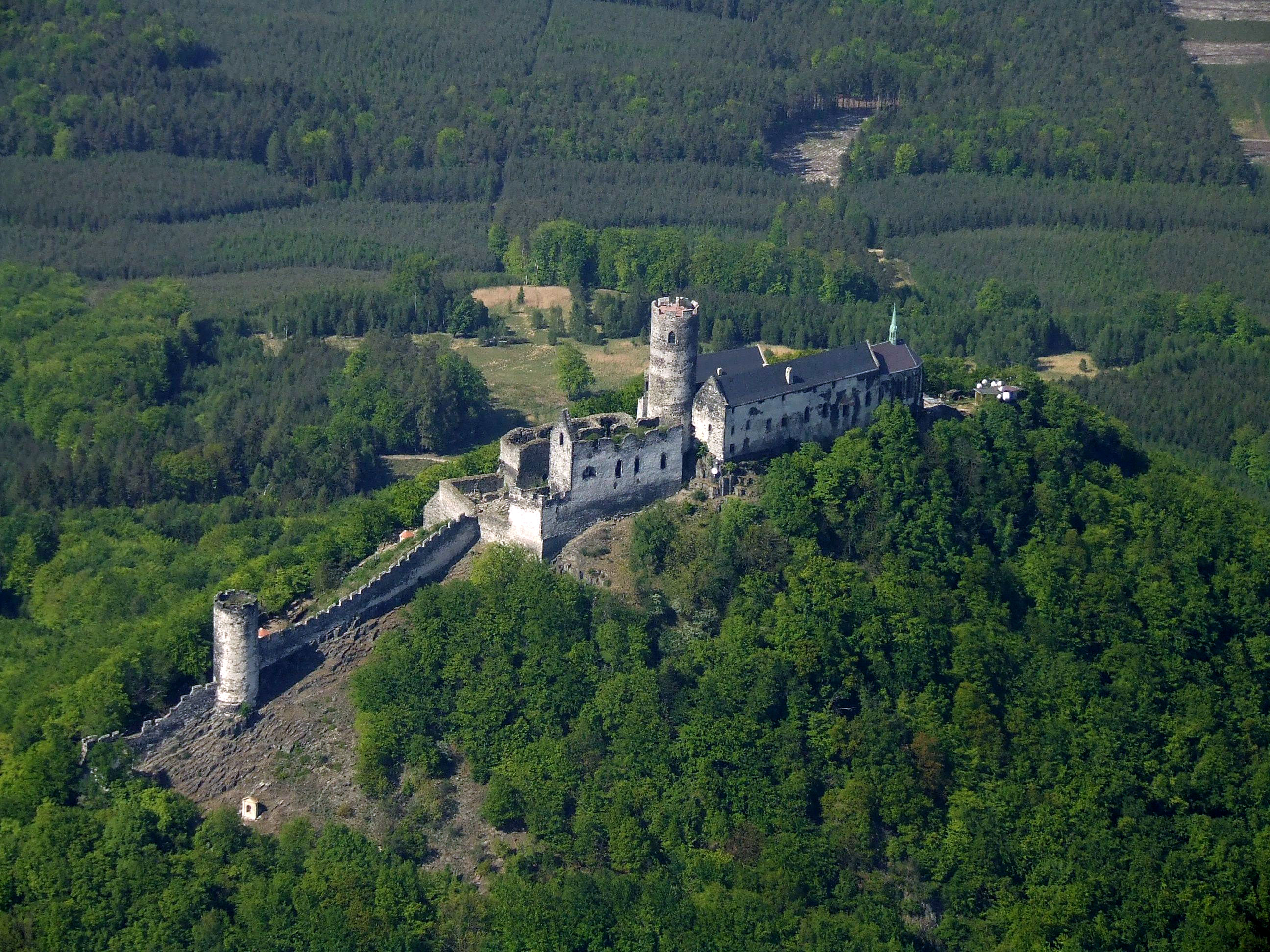
Bezděz Castle

- 1958, Jaroslav Krombholc conductor, Prague National Theatre Orchestra and Chorus; Karel Kalaš, Přemysl Kočí, Štěpánka Štěpánová, Štefa Petrová, Ivo Žídek - Supraphon
- 1982, Zdeněk Košler conductor, Prague National Theatre Orchestra and Chorus; Jaroslav Horáček, Václav Zítek, Věra Soukupová, Daniela Šounová, Leo Marian Vodička, Karel Průša, Oldřich Spisar, Bohuslav Maršík, Eva Hlobilová, Alfréd Hampel, Pavel Horáček - Supraphon
