= Karel Kalaš =

Czech opera singer

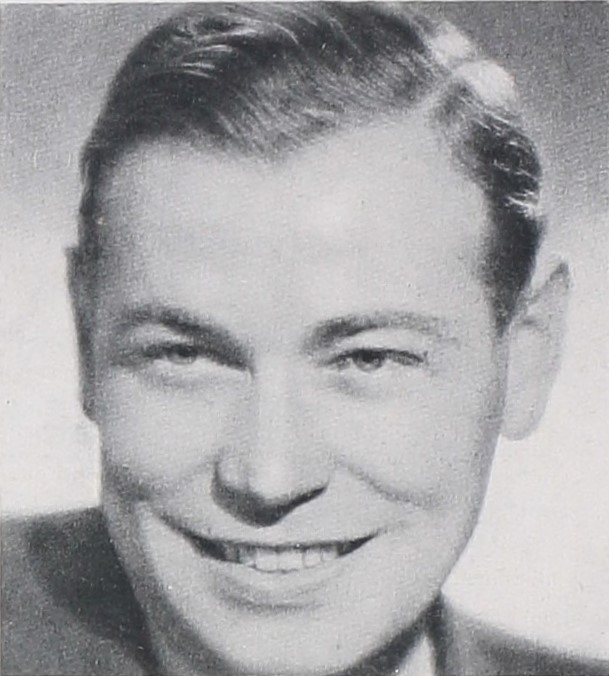
- Born: 9 October 1910; Vienna, Austria-Hungary
- Died: 3 May 2001 (aged 90); Prague, Czech Republic
- Occupation: Opera singer (bass)
- Years active: 1934–1972

Signature
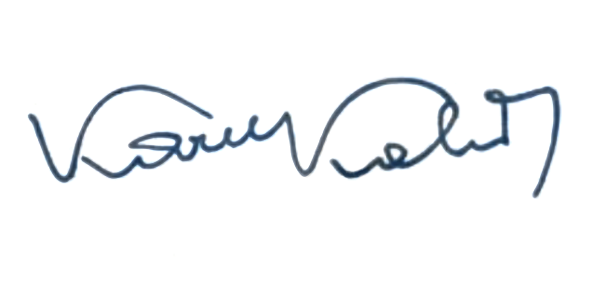

Karel Kalaš (9 October 1910 – 3 May 2001) was a Czech operatic bass and film and television actor. He first rose to prominence at the Slovak National Theatre, where he was a member from 1934 through 1939. He left there to join the roster of principal singers at the National Theatre in Prague, where he worked until his retirement from the opera stage in 1972. He appeared in a handful of films and occasionally on Czech television during his career, notably winning acclaim for his portrayal of a retired opera singer in the 1978 film Kulový blesk.

Kalaš's voice is preserved on a large number of recordings made on the Ultraphon, Esta, Bruno, Multisonic, and Urania labels. He also appeared on a number of complete opera recordings with the Prague National Theatre on the Supraphon label.

== Biography ==
Born in Vienna, Austria-Hungary to parents of Czech descent, Kalaš initially worked for a printing business in his native city. During this time he began studying singing privately with Ferdinand Pagin. He began his career singing in choirs in Vienna but was unable to land work as a soloist with any of the theatres in the city. Discouraged, he decided that he would try to find employment in his parents' homeland and moved to Czechoslovakia in 1932, where he eventually became a citizen.

In 1934, Kalaš succeeded in landing a contract with the Slovak National Theatre in Bratislava, where he began to assail mainly roles from the standard Czech repertoire like Kecal in Bedřich Smetana's The Bartered Bride and the High priest in Antonín Dvořák's Vanda. Renowned conductor Václav Talich attended several of his performances at the theatre and, impressed with the young bass, poached him for the National Theater in Prague.

Kalaš made his debut at the Prague National Theatre (PNT) as Kecal inn 1939 and became, along with Eduard Haken, one of the house's most important basses during the 1940 and 1950s. An early major success for him at the theatre was the role of Count Vilém of Harasov in Dvořák's The Jacobin. Among his signature roles in Prague were Beneš in Dalibor, Dosifey in Mussorgsky's Khovanshchina, the King in The Love for Three Oranges, Mumlal in The Two Widows, Paloucký in The Kiss, Leporello in Don Giovanni, King Philip II in Giuseppe Verdi's Don Carlos, Prince Gremin in Eugene Onegin, and Vodník in Rusalka.

In 1942 Kalaš sang in the world premiere of František Škroup's Columbus (composed 1855) at the PNT. He notably toured with the PNT to Russia, Germany, and Belgium, appearing at such houses as the Bolshoi Theatre (1955), the Berlin State Opera (1956), and La Monnaie (1958). In 1965 he was honored with the title People's Artist of the USSR and he was awarded a Thalia Award in 1995.
