= The Devil's Wall =

Opera by Bedřich Smetana

- Opera by Bedřich Smetana
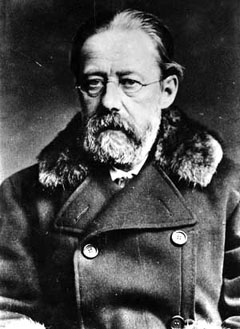
- The composer around 1883
- Native title: Čertova stěna
- Librettist: Eliška Krásnohorská
- Language: Czech
- Premiere: 29 October 1882; Nové České Divadlo, Prague

The Devil's Wall (Czech: Čertova stěna) is a comic-romantic opera in three acts, with music by Bedřich Smetana and libretto by Eliška Krásnohorská, in their third operatic collaboration. The subtext of the plot is a Czech legend of a sheer rockface that overlooks the Vltava river, near the old monastery of Vyšši Brod, where the Devil was said to have halted the building of the monastery by damming the Vltava, which then rose and flooded the site.

== Background ==
Krásnohorská had originally intended her scenario to be serious in nature, a symbolic representation of the conflict between the Church and the Devil. By contrast, Smetana had wanted a less serious treatment. She acceded to his demands and provided such a scenario, but then Smetana changed his thinking on the story. He reworked the plot such that he turned the young girl, Hedvika, into a surrogate for Lord Vok's late first wife, and the story became more serious in that aspect. As a result of these changes, Krásnohorská and Smetana did not have contact for a year and a half, and Smetana made substantial changes to Krásnohorská's submitted libretto without her input, deleting up to 500 of her original verses.

Smetana completed Act 1 in March 1881, and Act 3 in April 1882. The opera was first performed on 29 October 1882, at the Nové České Divadlo (New Czech Theatre) in Prague. The premiere was not successful, with difficulties including the staging and the wildly conflicting appearance of two singers whose characters were supposed to resemble each other. In spite of the tensions between librettist and composer, Krásnohorská attended the premiere and defended Smetana, to the point of keeping silent on criticism directed towards the libretto, of the changes which she herself did not sanction.

== Performance history ==
Productions continued in Prague during the 20th century; Václav Talich conducted the opera in Prague after he was released from post-war detention. A Prague production was mounted in Wiesbaden in May 1963. In 1974 one by Josef Svoboda was conducted by Bohumil Gregor (who had led the previous production in Prague) with Libuše Márová, Jindřich Jindrák, Ivo Žídek, Beno Blachut, Anna Bortlová and Gabriela Beňačková. Pilsen saw productions in 1997 and 2024.

The first UK production was by University College Opera, in London, in February 1987.

== Roles ==
| Role | Voice type | Premiere Cast, 29 October 1882 (Conductor: Adolf Čech) |
|---|---|---|
| Lord Vok Vítkovic | baritone | Josef Lev |
| Záviš | contralto | Betty Fibichová |
| Jarek, knight in service of Vok | tenor | Antonín Vávra |
| Rarach, the devil | bass | Josef Chlumeckÿ |
| Hedvika, Countess of Šauenburka | soprano | Irma Reichová |
| Michálek, the steward of Rožmberk Castle | tenor | Adolf Krössing |
| Katuška, his daughter | soprano | Marie Sittová |
| Beneš, a hermit | bass | Frantisek Hynek |
Chorus: Messengers of Přemysl Otakar II, knights, the Countess's retinue, castle residents, peasants, monsters.

== Synopsis ==
=== Act 1 ===
(Craggy wooded landscape by the castle of Rožmberk, 13th century) It is morning, and the steward of Rožmberk Castle, Michálek, who is in the service of the Lord of South Bohemia, Vok Vítkovic of Ruže, meets the knight Jarek. Jarek has returned from unsuccessfully having paid court to the widow of the Mandalena of behalf of his lord. The two men are ashamed that their glorious and gentle master, so eminent in the Czech kingdom, cannot find a bride (Duet). In a bout of allegiance Jarek swears to God that he himself will not marry until Vok has done so (Aria). His oath is overheard by Rarach, an evil spirit, disguised as a hermit. Michálek and Jarek leave and Rarach meets the hermit Beneš, his double. The holy man recognizes him as a demon who still accompanies him (Duet).

After their departure, Michálek's daughter, Katuška enters, looking forward to Jarek's return (Aria). Girls with scythes come in from the harvest to greet her (Chorus) and Jarek appears, but Katuška holds back, thinking that as she is from a simple family she is not worthy of a knight. Jarek dismisses her doubts and assures her of his love (Aria). They embrace and promise each other (Duet) but Rarach appears, mocking them, and reminding Jarek of his oath of bachelorhood.

Vok arrives with his royal retinue, including his young nephew Záviš. The castle folk welcome (Chorus). Vok asks Jarek about the outcome of his quest, but is not surprised when Jarek says that Vok has been refused: Vok is resigned to grow old and die alone. Castle Michálek convinces him to think of continuing his family and to not cease to look for a bride. Jarek and Rarach join the same plea, and the demon tells Vok that the castle steward has a captivating daughter. Michálek is delighted by the idea of a marriage to Katuška but Katuška and Jarek are horrified at the thought (Sextet). But Záviš suspects that the girl loves another and she admits her love for Jarek. Michálek is indignant, but Vok joins the hands of Katuška and Jarek, promising a wedding in the new Vyšší Brod monastery, (Arioso). Jarek remembers his oath and must refuse; Michálek explains to Vok what Jarek swore (Aria). He urges his master to get married, and others join him in this. Rarach, mistaken for Beneš, forces Vok to make a promise of appointment with the abbot. Vok agrees but at that moment, a messenger arrives at the castle to tell Vok that the Lady of Šauenburk has died and entrusts her orphaned daughter Hedvika to his protection. On Rarach's advice, Vok sends for the orphan, but before leaving, he explains that he once loved the mistress of Šauenburk, but she cast him off and married another. Since then, Vok has been unable to love any other woman. Závis goes to fetch Hedvika while Vok departs for the monastery with Rarach. Beneš summons the courage to denounce the demon, but Rarach laughs at him.

=== Act 2 ===
(A shepherd's hut) Jarek in pilgrim's garb rests in an old shepherd's hut – but it is Rarach in disguise. Jarek is hoping to pray, fast and make pilgrimage to fulfill his affection, but his passion for Katuška gnaws at him (Aria). In sleep Rarach makes him dream of Katuška (Aria). In the grand hall at the Rožmberk Castle, Michálek still cannot cope that he has missed the chance to become Vok's father-in-law (Aria). Katuška asks Beneš (Rarach in disguise) to arrange Vok to wed, so that she can take Jarek. Michálek asks the false Beneš for Vok to be betrothed, but with his daughter. Rarach makes Jarek appear, who falls into Katuška's arms, but the memory of the unfortunate oath returns. Vok appears to Jarek to welcome him back to his castle, but Záviš comes to announce with enthusiasm the arrival of Hedvika (Aria). Vok sings of his longing for youth and dreams of returning (Aria & Quintet).

Hedvika enters, wearing the medallion left her mother, on which Vok instantly recognizes his unrequited love (Aria). Vok accepts her as his daughter, seeing in Hedvika's face her mother's (Duet). Vok feels his old love returned (Aria). However, Rarach and Beneš come to him and remind him of his pledge to enter the monastery where Beneš will be abbot, not to get married. So he cannot release Jarek from the oath (Trio).

Vok summons his court and announces his intention to enter the monastery that evening. Everyone is angry at the hermit who instigated the idea and convinces Vok not to give up the blessing of love and service of his homeland. Vok relents and announces that if a girl comes to the monastery that night for him for sincere love, he will marry her (Finale).

=== Act 3 ===
(The rocky strand of the Vltava river beneath Vyšší Brod) Vok, Záviš and Michálek are heading towards the monastery; Vok sends Michálek over the bridge first. Záviš does not understand why his uncle wants to be amongst the monks, but Vok sees relief from his dashed hopes. He thinks Závis and Hedvika love each other and wishes them to marry. But Záviš is surprised by this as Hedvika is indifferent to him, and reminds Vok that he has welcomed Hedvika to his home. Now Jarek and Katuška arrive, bringing the unsuspecting Hedvika. When she sees the monastery, she realizes that she was brought to where Vok is expecting a potential bride. Vok addresses her, but loses his courage and will not follow his heart; and they all go on to the monastery. Hedvika feels a strange emotion at his outburst. Záviš, Jarek and Katuška go to convince her that Vok loves her truly, but she must act quickly (Quartet).

Záviš is convinced that Vok loves Hedvika and hurries over the bridge to the monastery to convince his uncle, but Michálek blocks his passage as he has been ordered not to let anyone talk to Vok, who is praying, and a duel almost ensues between them before Beneš intervenes. Beneš holds Michálek to confess to him that a demon has worked to persuade Vok to hold back from love and prevent the marriage of Katuška and Jarek. He, Beneš, stopped Vok's marriage to earn money for the new monastery. Michálek forgives his conniving, and Beneš asks him to quickly bring Hedvika to Vok as a bride – but Michálek is determined to give Vok his Katuška instead.

Beneš, guarding the footbridge, is confronted by Rarach, in still disguised as a shepherd with a herd of sheep. However, Beneš by this time stronger uses the sign of the cross to stop the demon from the footbridge and approaching the monastery.

Two groups of girls in the valley are on their way to the monastery, hoping to become Vok's bride (Women's chorus). Village lads with willow meals catch up with them claiming they would be unfaithful for a pot of gold (Men's chorus). The girls ask for forgiveness and the couples are reconciled, but as they leave thunder and storms arise. Rarach summons his monsters and demons, who leap from the rocks and perform devilish dancing. Rarach stops them and gets them to build a wall across the valley, so that the waters of the Vltava will flood the monastery and drown Vok and Beneš (Aria).

Hedvika appears, escaping from Záviš, and she sees the monastery, but also the danger of the disaster of which Vok is unaware and she wants to warn him. In the face of the danger that threatens Vok, she realizes her love for him (Arioso). Jarek tries to keep her from the dangerous path and to warn Vok himself, but Hedvika persists and they climb to the devil's wall together while from the bank Katuška prays for their protection. Hedvika and Jarek are met by Beneš. While Vok only perceives that Hedvika came to him, Beneš curses the devil's work and the wall collapses, Rarach's power runs away, the storm abates.

Závis and the people announce a royal message for Vok (Chorus). Katuška and Jarek rejoice because they already know about Vok's wedding, and therefore their own (Quintet). The envoys say that Premysl Otakar II, has appointed Vok the governor of Austria, Styria and Carinthia (Chorus). Vok accepts the command, but Hedvika is hesitant to follow him abroad as a daughter. Beneš prompts her to be a wife. All wish long life to lord Vok.

== Recordings ==
- 1960, Zdeněk Chalabala (conductor), Prague National Theatre Chorus and Orchestra; Václav Bednář (Vok Vítkovic), Ivana Mixová (Záviš Vítkovic), Ivo Žídek (Jarek), Milada Šubrtová (Hedvika), Antonín Votava (Michálek), Libuše Domanínská (Katuška), Karel Berman (Beneš), Ladislav Mráz (Rarach)
