= Růžena Maturová =

Czech operatic soprano

- Růžena Maturová

Background information
- Born: 2 September 1869; Prague, Austria-Hungary
- Died: 25 February 1938 (aged 68) Prague, Czechoslovakia
- Genre: Opera
- Occupation: Singer
- Instrument: Vocals

Růžena Maturová (2 September 1869 – 25 February 1938) was a Czech operatic soprano whose international career began in the late 1880s and continued through the first decade of the 20th century.

Born in Prague, Bohemia, she was the leading soprano at the National Theatre there and created roles in several operas including three by Antonín Dvořák: the Princess in The Devil and Kate (1898), and the title roles in Rusalka (1901) and Armida (1904).

After her retirement from the stage in 1910, she taught singing in Prague. Her most famous pupil was the contralto Marta Krásová. Maturová also appeared in four silent films in the early 1920s.

Růžena Maturová died in Prague in 1938 at the age of 68.
