= Adolf Čech =

Czech conductor (1841–1903)

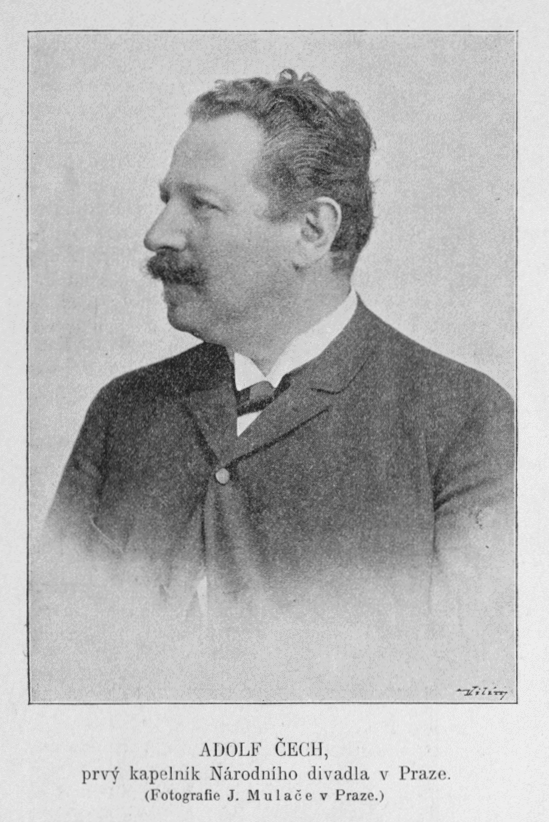

Background information
- Born: Adolf Jan Antonín Tausík; 11 December 1841; Sedlec-Prčice, Bohemia, Austrian Empire
- Died: 27 December 1903 (aged 62) Prague, Bohemia, Austria-Hungary
- Genres: Classical
- Occupation: Conductor
- Instrument: vocals
- Years active: 1862–1903
- Formerly of: Provisional Theatre, National Theatre

Adolf Čech (born Adolf Jan Antonín Tausík; 11 December 1841 – 27 December 1903) was a Czech conductor, who premiered a number of significant works by Antonín Dvořák (the 2nd, 5th and 6th symphonies, more than any other conductor; other important orchestral works, four operas, the Stabat Mater), Bedřich Smetana (Má vlast, five operas), Zdeněk Fibich (two operas) and other Czech composers. He also led the first performances outside Russia of two operas by Pyotr Ilyich Tchaikovsky and the Czech premieres of seven operettas by Jacques Offenbach. He was also a bass singer and a translator of opera librettos.

== Career ==
Adolf Čech was born in Sedlec-Prčice, south of Prague as Adolf Jan Antonín Tausík, the son of a singing instructor. His brother was the singer Karel Čech. He trained as an engineer in Prague before turning to music. From 1862 he was choirmaster and assistant conductor at the Provisional Theatre, where he conducted operas such as Verdi's Il trovatore, Donizetti's Belisario, Rossini's Otello, Lortzing's Zar und Zimmermann (Tsar and Carpenter), Meyerbeer's Dinorah, and Flotow's Martha and Alessandro Stradella. From 1862 to 1866 he also appeared as a bass singer in smaller solo roles such as Don Basilio in The Barber of Seville, Méru in Meyerbeer's Les Huguenots, Pedro in Conradin Kreutzer's Das Nachtlager in Granada, and Ruiz in Verdi's Il trovatore. In 1864 he made a Czech translation of Eugène Scribe's libretto for Halévy's opera La Juive, and led the Czech premiere of Offenbach's Orpheus in the Underworld.

In 1865/66 he was deputy conductor at the Czech Theatre in Olomouc. He returned to the Provisional Theatre in 1867, where he made his name in comic opera. He conducted the Czech premieres of Offenbach's Les brigands (1870), La princesse de Trébizonde (1871), Snowman (1872), Les braconniers, Barbe-bleue (1874) and La belle Hélène (1875).

In 1873 he conducted the Prague premiere of Schumann's Symphony No. 3. On 4 April 1875 he conducted the world premiere of Bedřich Smetana's Vltava (The Moldau). This was one of the six symphonic poems that made up the cycle known as Má vlast (My Country), which Čech was also the first to conduct in 1882.

On 17 April 1876 he premiered Antonín Dvořák's opera Vanda. He introduced Dvořák's Serenade for Strings in E minor on 10 December 1876. At the same concert (or 17 March 1877) he conducted the premiere of Smetana's symphonic poem Šarka, another part of the Má vlast cycle.

He conducted the premieres of Smetana's operas The Kiss (7 November 1876), The Secret (18 September 1878), and the revised version of The Two Widows (17 March 1878).

Dvořák composed his Piano Concerto in G minor during August and September 1876, at the request of the pianist Karel Slavkovský, who gave the premiere in Prague on 24 March 1878, with Adolf Čech conducting. On 25 March 1879 came the premiere of Dvořák's Symphony No. 5 in F major. On 23 April 1879 he led the premiere of Dvořák's "Festival March", Op. 54, B.88. On 16 May he introduced Dvořák's Czech Suite. At the same concert he conducted for the first time the orchestral versions of Slavonic Dances Nos. 1, 2 and 4 (Set I).

On 23 December 1880 at the concert of the Association of Musical Artists in Prague, Adolf Čech premiered Dvořák's Stabat Mater, his first work on a religious theme.

Dvořák's Symphony No. 6 in D minor had a troubled birth. He dedicated it to Hans Richter, who had commissioned it, and he asked Richter to premiere it with the Vienna Philharmonic in late December 1880. However, events in Richter's personal life and anti-Czech sentiment in Vienna, combined with the fact that Dvořák was virtually unknown there (none of his symphonies had been published at this time), caused its continual postponement. Dvořák responded by asking Adolf Čech to premiere the symphony in Prague on 25 March 1881. Vienna did not see it until 1883, and not under Richter, who conducted it many times, but never in Vienna.

The opening of the National Theatre in Prague on 11 June 1881 was celebrated with the world premiere of Smetana's opera Libuše, conducted by Adolf Čech. On 29 October 1882 he led the premiere of Smetana's The Devil's Wall. The first complete performance of Má vlast occurred on 5 November 1882.

On 28 July 1882, in Prague, Čech conducted the first production outside Russia of any opera by Tchaikovsky, the Czech premiere of The Maid of Orleans.

He was appointed chief conductor of the Provisional Theatre in 1883, holding the post until 1900.

On 28 March 1884 he led the world premiere of Zdeněk Fibich's opera The Bride of Messina. In 1885 came the National Theatre's first performance of Wagner's Lohengrin (he also conducted their first performance of The Mastersingers of Nuremberg in 1894).

On 15 June 1887 he conducted the premiere of the revised version of Dvořák's opera King and Charcoal Burner.

On 2 November 1887 he led a concert celebrating the centenary of the world premiere in Prague of Mozart's Don Giovanni.

In March 1888, Adolf Čech conducted the world premiere of Dvořák's Symphony No. 2 in B-flat major, which had been written in 1865 and subject to various revisions in the intervening years. It was the sole performance of the work in the composer's lifetime. Adolf Čech premiered more of Dvořák's symphonies than anyone else (he conducted the first performances of Nos. 2, 5 and 6; the composer premiered Nos. 7 and 8; Smetana led Nos. 3 and 4; Anton Seidl conducted No. 9; and Milan Sachs premiered No. 1).

Čech prepared the orchestra for the first Czech performance of Tchaikovsky's Eugene Onegin on 6 December 1888 (the first production of that opera outside Russia; it was sung in Czech in a translation by Marie Červinková-Riegrová). Tchaikovsky himself conducted the premiere. On 12 October 1892 he conducted the Czech premiere of The Queen of Spades (also sung in Czech) at the National Theatre, in the presence of the composer.

In 1893 he was involved in the very successful Berlin premiere of Smetana's opera The Bartered Bride.

Fibich's opera Šárka was premiered on 28 December 1897 on the stage of the National Theatre in Prague with Adolf Čech conducting. On 19 June 1898 he premiered the revised version of Dvořák's opera The Jacobin. On 6 August 1898 he premiered Josef Suk's incidental music for Julius Zeyer's melodrama Radúz and Mahulena (Suk later extracted the suite A Fairy Tale from the complete score). On 23 April 1899 he conducted the world premiere of Dvořák's opera The Devil and Kate.

He died in Prague in 1903, aged 62, and is buried at the Olšany Cemetery.
