= The Devil and Kate =

Opera by Antonín Dvořák

- Opera by Antonín Dvořák
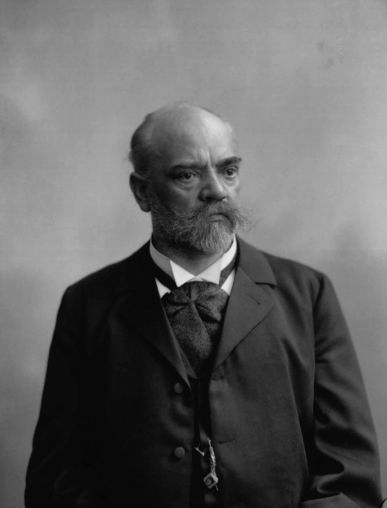
- Antonín Dvořák in 1904
- Librettist: Adolf Wenig
- Language: Czech
- Based on: farce by Josef Kajetán Tyl
- Premiere: 18 November 1899; National Theatre, Prague

The Devil and Kate, Op. 112, B. 201, (Čert a Káča in Czech) is an opera in three acts by Antonín Dvořák to a Czech libretto by Adolf Wenig. It is based on a farce by Josef Kajetán Tyl, and the story also had been treated as the fairy tale Devil and Káča by Božena Němcová. The first performance of the opera was at the National Theatre, Prague, on 23 November 1899, under Adolf Čech.

The Devil and Kate is one of the few operas of Dvořák, along with Rusalka, to have remained in the repertory. This can be attributed to the high demand for Italian grand operas in his time and the difficulties of Dvořák's intricate staging. The opera has great appeal because of its combination of fairy tale and folk music; it is very close in feel to a Czech tone poem. At times, it feels like a Czech version of Hansel & Gretel. The overture was written after the opera itself.

John Clapham has written critical analysis of the opera and noted the presence of the style of Wagnerian declamation in the work.

== Roles ==
| Role | Voice type | Premiere Cast, 23 November 1899. (Conductor: Adolf Čech) |
|---|---|---|
| Káča (Kate) | mezzo-soprano | Marie Klánová-Panznerová |
| Marbuel, a devil | bass | Václav Kliment |
| Jirka, a shepherd | tenor | Bohumil Pták |
| Kate's mother | mezzo-soprano | Růžena Vykoukalová-Bradácová |
| Lucifer | bass | Robert Polák |
| The Princess | soprano | Růžena Maturová |
| The Devil's Gate-Keeper | bass | Karel Veverka |
| A Devil Guard | bass | Joseph Karásek |
| The Princess's Chamberlain | bass | Josef Zizka |
| A Chambermaid | soprano | Vilemína Hajková |
| A Musician | tenor | Hynek Svejda |

== Synopsis ==
Place: The village of Dlouhá Lhota in Bohemia and, in act 2, in Hell
Time: around 1825

=== Act 1 ===
On a summer evening, Jirka, slightly intoxicated, begs to be excused from further dancing outside the village inn, as he will be in trouble with his employer, the Princess's Steward, if he does not return to his work. Kate then appears with her mother, and Jirka leaves with some of the musicians. Kate wants to dance, but her mother doesn't want her daughter to embarrass herself. Infuriated, Kate says that she will dance with a devil if necessary. Suddenly, a mysterious hunter appears, asking about the Steward and the Princess. He sits down with Kate, engages her in conversation, and asks her to dance with him. She accepts, eventually collapsing with exhaustion but nevertheless exhilarated. Jirka returns, furious with the Steward, who shouted at him for bringing the musicians with him, then beat him, dismissed him and told him to go to Hell. Meanwhile, the hunter has persuaded Kate to go with him to his splendid dwelling. He stamps on the ground, and the two of them disappear into the earth amid thunder, lightning and smoke. It is apparent to all that they have gone to Hell. Jirka, having nothing to lose, consoles Kate's mother by agreeing to follow the pair and rescue Kate, and the Act ends as he jumps into the new hole in the ground.

=== Act 2 ===
In Hell, some Devils are playing cards for money. The Guard announces the arrival of Lucifer, who asks whether Marbuel has returned from Earth. On discovering that he hasn't, Lucifer asks to be informed when he does appear, and departs. The Gate-Keeper explains to the other Devils that Lucifer had sent Marbuel to see if the Princess and her Steward are ripe for Hell yet, as Marbuel is the mysterious hunter from Act 1. Marbuel now arrives, exhausted and carrying Kate, whom the Devils initially mistake for the Princess. She harangues him at length, and Marbuel explains that she is wearing a cross, which protects her against him so that he can't get rid of her. Lucifer re-enters to find out what the shouting is about. Then Jirka, saying that he has come for Kate, is admitted by the Gate-Keeper. He suggests to Lucifer that Kate might be bought off, and she is tempted by some golden chains that are produced. Meanwhile, Lucifer questions Marbuel about his trip, and agrees that the Princess should be brought to Hell, while the Steward should be threatened but reprieved for the time being. Marbuel now has to promise Jirka that he shall have some of the Princess's gold - given him by the Steward to reward him for fighting off the threatening Marbuel - if he will take Kate back to Earth. Jirka, pleased with the plan, agrees that the way to do that is to dance with Kate, and he manages to dance her out past the Gate-Keeper. The latter slams the gate shut, to the great relief of all, especially Marbuel, who remarks that music has succeeded in doing what the denizens of Hell could not.

=== Act 3 ===
A hall in the Princess's castle. Marbuel's plan has worked, and Jirka rescued the Steward (who never appears on stage in the opera). The Princess has started to repent her misdeeds, but fears that nothing can save her, since the Steward was only doing her bidding and it is she whom the devils must carry to Hell. Nevertheless, she has summoned Jirka in the hope that he can ward them off. Jirka, embarrassed, tells her that she has already committed too many evil deeds, and he cannot help. The Princess promises to reform, but Jirka tells her that, unless she agrees to free the serfs, she will go to Hell and not even he will be able to save her. She agrees, and her Chamberlain announces her decree to the waiting crowd outside, who greet it with acclaim. Jirka now tells the Princess that he has a plan which will save her, and she exits so that he can make preparations.

Jirka summons Kate, and explains that when Marbuel comes for the Princess, she (Kate) will be able to take her revenge on him. Kate enthusiastically agrees, and hides in the next room. The Princess returns and, instructed by Jirka, sits in her chair with her courtiers round her, while Jirka joins Kate. The moon illuminates the room and then the light turns red as Marbuel appears, telling the Princess that her time on Earth is up. To Marbuel's irritation, Jirka interrupts, but his annoyance changes to horror when Jirka tells him that Kate is coming to get him. The door flies open, and Kate stands in the lighted doorway. Marbuel screams and disappears through the window, never to return. The grateful Princess appoints Jirka as her new Prime Minister, and agrees that Kate shall have the best house in the town and plenty of money. Kate would also like to get married, but she anticipates that, with her new-found wealth, she will have no problem making a good match. The peasants arrive to thank the Princess for freeing them from bondage. Jirka promises them that, although now a minister, he is still on their side, and they depart, rejoicing, to enjoy a banquet provided by the Princess.

== Recordings ==
- Supraphon LPV 337-339 (1957): Ludmila Komancová, Rudolf Asmus, Přemysl Kočí, Lubomir Havlák, Marie Steinerova, Rudolf Vonasek, Jaroslava Vymazalova, Jaroslav Horáček, Karel Berman; Prague National Theatre Chorus and Orchestra; Zdeněk Chalabala, conductor.
- Supraphon 11 1800-2 612 (1978): Anna Barová, Daniela Suryová, Richard Novák, Jaroslav Horáček, Aleš Šťáva, Jan Hladík, Pavel Kamas, Miloš Ježil, Oldřich Polášek, Natalie Romanová-Achaladze, Brigita Šulcová; Brno State Philharmonic Chorus; Brno Janáček Opera Orchestra; Jiří Pinkas, conductor
- Kultur DVD D4443: Anne-Marie Owens, Joseph Evans, Peter Lightfoot, Kristine Ciesinski, Marko Putkonen, Joan Davies, Phillip Guy-Bromley, Kathleen Tynan, Alan Fairs, Geoffrey Davidson, Michael Forest, Julie Wong, Gavin Claire, Rossa Dunphy: Wexford Festival Chorus, Radio Telefís Éireann Symphony Orchestra; Albert Rosen, conductor.
