= Karel Čech =

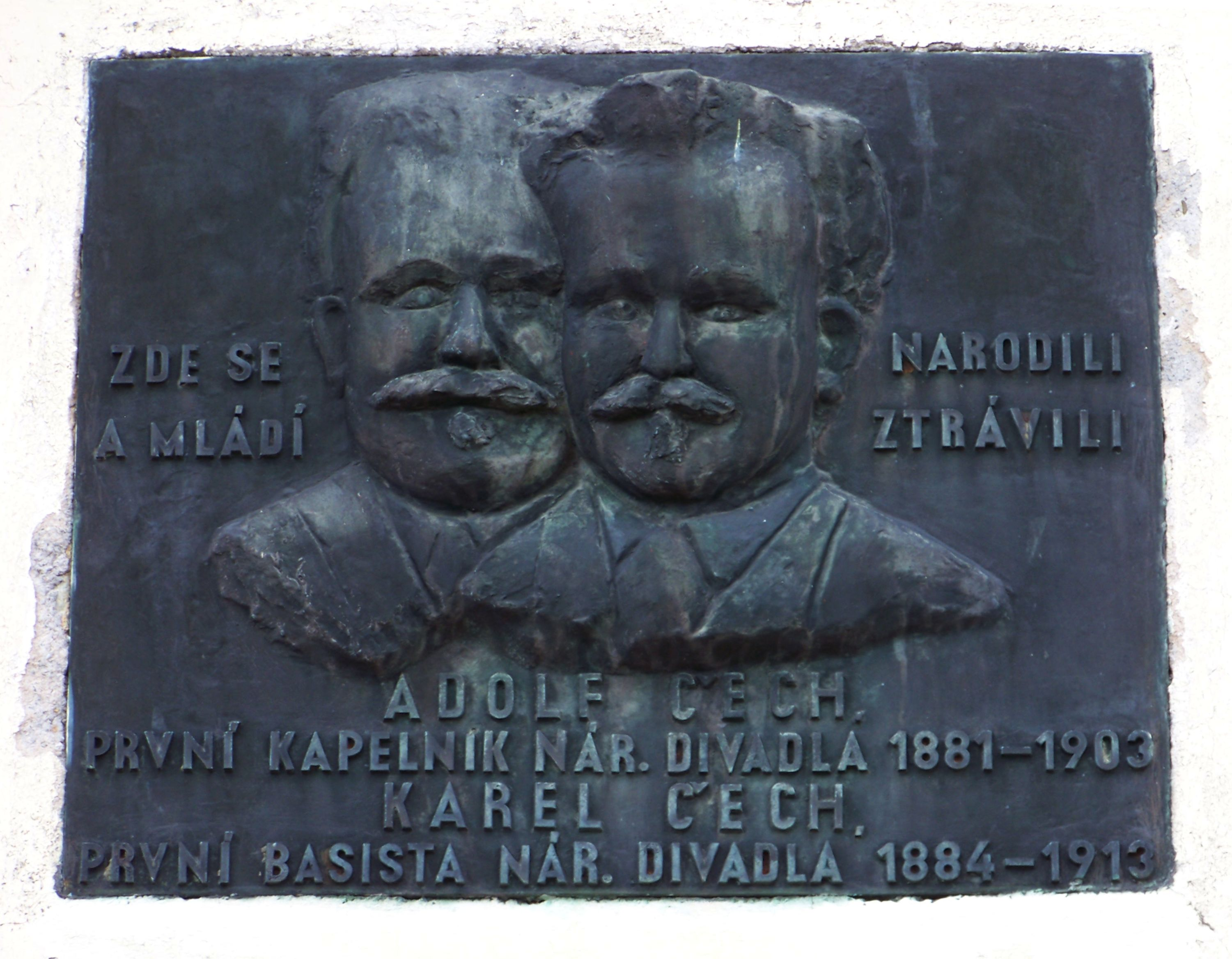
Memorial plaque of Adolf and Karel Čech on their birthplace in Prčice, No. 115

Karel Čech (real name Karel Antonín Tausík; 9 May 1844 – 28 February 1913) was a Czech bass singer of concert and operatic music. As a singer, he participated in the premieres of several operas by Bedřich Smetana at the Provisional and later at the National Theatre in Prague. His older brother was Adolf Čech, the long-time conductor of the National Theatre orchestra.

== Life ==
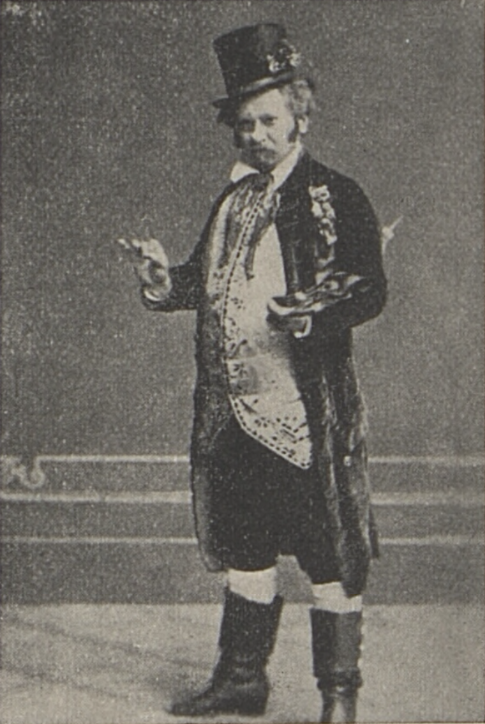
Karel Čech as Kecal in Smetana's The Bartered Bride (National Theatre, 1878)

He was born Karel Antonín Tausík in Prčice in Bohemia, Austrian Empire, on 9 May 1844 into a musically inclined family. Like his brother Adolf, he received musical education from his father. He went to Prague to study medicine at the Charles Ferdinand University, but soon abandoned his studies and joined the Švestkova Theatre as a student, and in the following years he sang other vocal forms.

In 1868, through the intervention of Bedřich Smetana, he was engaged in the opera company of the Prague Provisional Theatre under the direction of the theatre director Jan Nepomuk Mayr, where he made his debut in the role of the inquisitor Almamen in Karel Bendl's opera Lejla. He then worked successfully at the Provisional Theatre, from 1870 as the first bass, throughout the 1870s, until he fell ill with a vocal cord disease in 1881. Despite extensive convalescence and vocal cord surgery in Vienna, he was dismissed from the theatre by the director Mayr. He briefly worked as a clerk in the editorial office of the daily Národní listy, but was rehired at the Theatre in 1882. In 1890, he officially ended his singing career.

In the following years, he worked as choir director and organist at the Basilica of St. Ludmila in Královské Vinohrady (now Vinohrady, a district of Prague) and as a music teacher at Prague grammar schools.

Čech died on 28 February 1913 in Královské Vinohrady at the age of 79. He was buried at the Vinohrady Cemetery.

== Work ==
During his career, he performed dozens of varied operatic singing roles. Among others, he performed in several premieres of operas by Bedřich Smetana: in 1874 at the Provisional Theatre as the gamekeeper Mumlal in The Two Widows, in 1878 at the Provisional Theatre as Father Paloucký in The Kiss and in the same year as Bonifác in The Secret, and in 1881 at the National Theatre as Chrudoš from Otava in Libuše. He also performed in premieres of operas by other Czech composers, including Antonín Dvořák, Karel Bendl, and Karel Kovařovic.
