= The Excursions of Mr. Brouček to the Moon and to the 15th Century =

Opera by Leoš Janáček

The Excursions of Mr. Brouček
- Satirical opera by Leoš Janáček
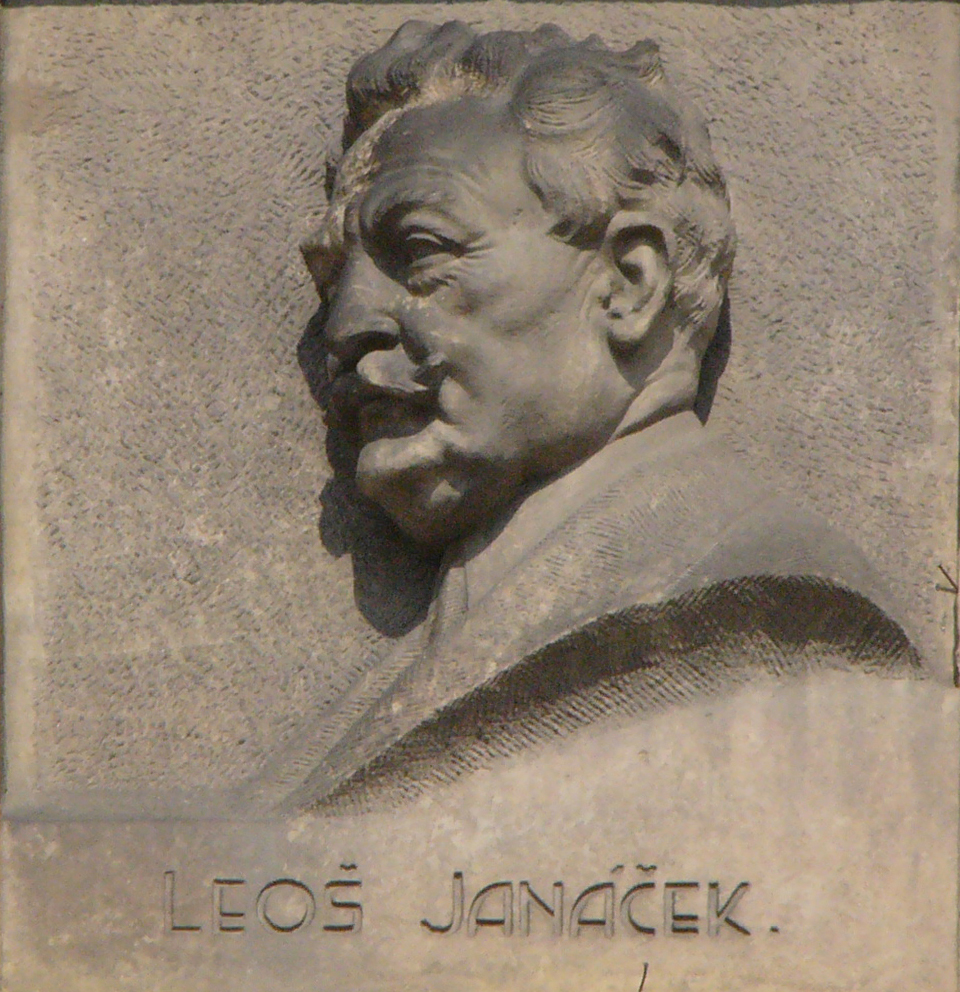
- Relief of the composer by Julius Pelikán
- Native title: Výlety páně Broučkovy
- Other title: The Excursions of Mr. Brouček to the Moon and to the 15th Century
- Language: Czech
- Based on: two novels by Svatopluk Čech
- Premiere: 23 April 1920; National Theatre, Prague

The Excursions of Mr. Brouček to the Moon and to the 15th Century (Czech: Výlety páně Broučkovy) is the complete title of Leoš Janáček’s fifth opera, based on two Svatopluk Čech novels, Pravý výlet pana Broučka do Měsíce (1888) (The True Excursion of Mr. Brouček to the Moon) and Nový epochální výlet pana Broučka, tentokráte do XV. století (1889) ('‘The Epoch-making Excursion of Mr. Brouček, this time to the 15th Century'’). The librettists for Part 1 were František Gellner, Viktor Dyk, František Sarafínský Procházka and others, while Part 2 was written by F. S. Procházka.

This two-part satirical opera was premiered at the National Theatre in Prague on 23 April 1920, the only Janáček opera not premiered in Brno.

Mr. Brouček (translated as "Mr. Beetle" (literally little beetle)) is a Philistine landlord in Prague who experiences a series of fantastic events as he is swept away (due in large part to excessive drinking) first to the Moon and then to 15th-century Prague, during the Hussite uprising against the Holy Roman Empire in 1420 (see Synopsis). In both excursions, Brouček encounters characters who are transformed versions of his earthly acquaintances.

Due to the popularity of the original novels by the iconic Czech writer Svatopluk Čech the opera was met with much scrutiny. Janáček experienced a number of setbacks in the creation and rehearsal of the work, especially in dealing with librettists (See Background). The composer's aim in The Excursions of Mr. Brouček was apparently quite specific: "I want us to be disgusted with such people, to stamp on them and strangle them when we meet them," speaking of Brouček. Janáček's campaign, along with Čech's, was against the pettiness of the bourgeoisie, specifically of Czechoslovakia. However, according to Desmond Shawe-Taylor, who saw the opera performed in Czechoslovakia, most observers reacted with cheerful laughter and even felt a bit sorry for the poor fellow Brouček. He became almost lovable rather than despised, as Janáček had originally intended, and his shortcomings, failings, and ordinariness tend to be seen as qualities common to regular citizens of all lands.

== Composition history ==
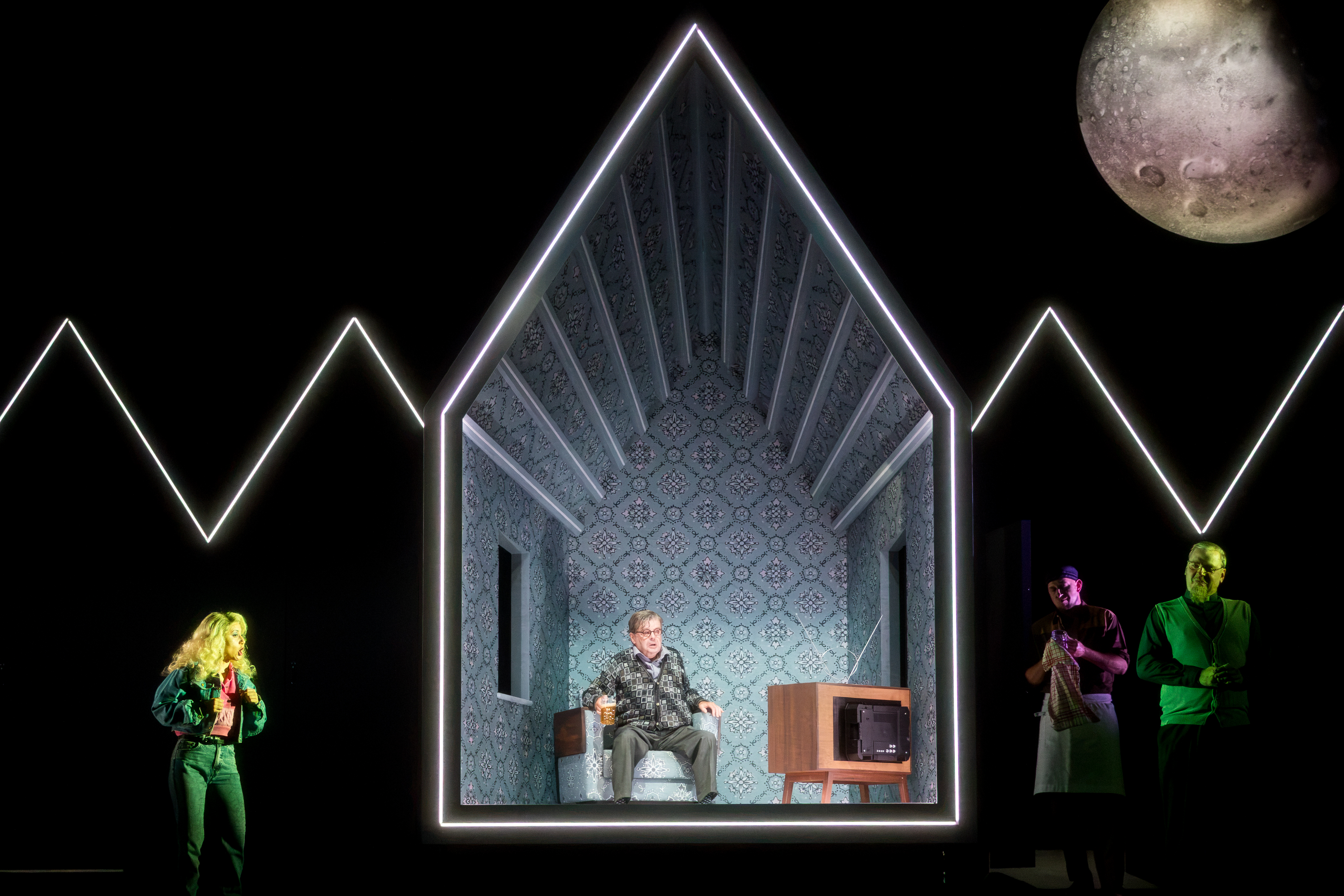
Scene from a 2026 production at the Bregenz Festival

The composition of Janáček's The Excursions of Mr. Brouček to the Moon was a long process complete with no fewer than seven librettists. The original concept of the opera was to be based on a still-popular novel series of the same name by Svatopluk Čech (1846–1908). After beginning the composition, Janáček set out to find a librettist who would fit his interpretation and realization of Čech's stories. In the early 20th century, Janáček sought to write an opera based on Čech's novels; however, Čech outrightly denied him the rights to his stories. Janáček eventually put the project aside until Čech's death in 1908. At this time, Janáček was reminded of his previous desire to set the story and sent letters to Artuš Rektorys, a friend of his in Prague, asking him to check the availability of the rights now that Čech had died. Rektorys responded with news that Čech's family was hesitant to release the rights, but after hearing from Janáček himself, they agreed to give him sole use of the novels. Shortly after being granted permission to begin composition, another composer, Karel Moor, had also written to Rektorys inquiring about Janáček's Brouček. Moor claimed he was given sole permission to the stories by Čech's younger brother, Vladimír. This matter was quickly attended to and it was found that Moor had not received valid permission. This did not stop him from producing an opera; it reached the stage in 1910, some ten years before Janáček's, but with none of the latter's success or longevity.

In March 1908, Janáček had set out to find a suitable librettist. Rektorys had recommended Karel Mašek; however, Mašek was not overly willing to undertake the assignment, a precursor to future trouble with the piece. After many discussions and a warning from Mašek that he was very much preoccupied, Janáček had sent his needs to Mašek with a deadline for Act I's completion. By July 1908 it had become increasingly clear that Mašek and Janáček had two very different ideas as to the outcome of Brouček. Mašek wrote that Janáček's ideas were too far from the original novel, which portrayed Brouček as haughty. Other conflicting views include the addition of two characters not in the original piece, the Young Waiter and Mazal. With the Young Waiter, Mašek conceded, but said this about Mazal:

...I can’t bring myself to add this part to Čech’s work in addition to Mazal at the Vikàrka. Čech’s Mr. Brouček would never have fraternized with Mazal and sat with him in the same pub.

These disagreements paired with Mašek's over-commitment with other works at the time led to his self-dismissal from the project in October of the same year. Janáček rebounded quickly from the loss of the librettist and started investigating a replacement.

In November 1908, Josef Holý was invited to the project, but he refused due to lack of interest in the material and said "If there is not the will or the right mood, it would not turn out well, however, I tried, and so I ask you to count me out." With Holý gone, Janáček turned to Dr. Zikmund Janke, an ear, nose and throat doctor working both in Prague and Luhačovice.

As with Mašek, there was a general disagreement between what Janáček had in mind and what Dr. Janke envisioned. Janáček was very amiable with colleagues and accepted what Janke had given him, including his harsh words. At this point, Janke had written an entire first act and started on the second when Janáček sent him a new outline to follow with new characterizations for ten of the roles. Out of all that was written thus far, only two lines of a drinking song survived the final cuts of Janke's work in the first act. In 1910, Janáček discovered through letters with Artuš Rektorys that Josef Holý, who originally turned down the project, had produced a ballet entitled The Moon. This shows that Holý had more interest than he had previously let on, as the ballet was conceptualized on Čech's story of Brouček. In April 1911 Janáček reconnected with Holý asking for help with a song during the Moon scene.

The next librettist was introduced to Janáček by Holý to help spread the workload around. František Gellner, a satirical poet, would eventually contribute the most work to the piece that still survives today of all the librettists that worked on the project. They worked together from June 1912 until June 1913, where a standstill took place and Janáček set to work on other projects. Gellner did write an ending to the piece, so why the pause happened is really only known to Janáček, as conceptually the structure was finished with only details remaining. However, the work resumed in November 1915 when Janáček decided that Brouček was worth finishing and promptly set to work finding the next librettist in line for the job.

The position went to Josef Peška, one of the men who helped secure Jenůfa in Prague. With great enthusiasm, he joined the list of writers who had accepted the work without reading the previously written libretto or musical score. Once Peška had read all the provided materials he sent a prompt response to Janáček reminding him to observe other people's renditions of the same piece. Most importantly he told Janáček a piece of information that will come back as critics review the opera after it reaches the stage, and that is that one needs to know Čech's story in order to understand the humor in Janáček and Gellner's version. He wrote a very private version, where one must have preexisting knowledge of the storyline to fully appreciate the piece. In addition, he sent him a list of new librettists who could help complete the project, with F.S. Procházka at the top.

It is unclear whether Janáček sent Gellner's ending to the opera to Procházka, because he created one of his own, starting with Act 3 until the end. Janáček gave his librettist complete freedom in range when it came to writing. He would provide an action, then state his indifference to how the action is accomplished, only that it needed to be. When something did not work for him, he would simply rewrite it himself. With this practice, Janáček wrote a larger piece of the work than most of the librettists did.

The piece was finished in 1916 with only details remaining, including the ending written by Gellner, and then adjusted by Janáček. A friend of Janáček, Jiří Mahen, was then enlisted to help overhaul sections of the opera. This position was used for editing purposes, but mostly the work that Janáček had provided, not necessarily the work of the other librettists. Mahen was uninformed as to how many others had worked on the piece, and was also unaware that it was actually completely done and set to music. After spending much time on the opera, Mahen was also surprised to learn that not only had the work been finished, but that Viktor Dyk had been penned as the librettist.

Janáček explained this in a letter to Mahen (naturally, he demanded satisfaction) saying that Dyk had approved of the original version Janáček had in mind, that so many others tried to change and had then supplied a more appropriate ending that fits more to Čech's ending of the story. Dyk and Janáček had worked diligently changing around music, text, scenes, characters, etc. to their liking, keeping only bits and pieces of what others had done. Mašek's work was reduced to two lines of work and Dr. Janke's work to a drinking song. The rest was removed in letters between Dyk and Janáček from Brno to Prague and vice versa.

Viktor Dyk was arrested for resistance activities against the Austro-Hungarian Empire, so again Janáček was in need of a new partner. Instead of finding a stranger to the piece, he went back to F.S. Procházka and asked his help in fine-tuning a few songs and scene changes, which he gladly accepted. Up until this point the opera ended when Mr. Brouček returns from his 'Moon voyage' only to find out that it was a drunken dream, but after reteaming with Procházka, Janáček posed the idea to start dramatizing the second Čech novel, The Excursions of Mr. Brouček to the XV Century. The two quickly leaped on this idea and began writing at once. By the end of 1918, they had compressed the entire opera into three acts, Act 1 in Prague in 1920, Act II on the Moon, and Act 3 in Prague in 1420. They even added a new set of characters that stayed with the opera's theme of recurring characters through this new third act (see list of characters).

In October 1918 Janáček had learned that Brouček would be performed at the National Theatre in Prague, given some adjustments to be made to costumes and set pieces. With the new trimmed-down version with three acts, there were fewer scene changes to be made, which pleased National Theatre Director Schmoranz. After discussions, casting, and orchestra rehearsal; there where still a few changes needed to be made, most being vocal range issues. (Janáček wrote very high tessitura for singers).

== Performance history ==
The UK premiere took place on 5 September 1970 at the King's Theatre in Edinburgh with Jaroslav Krombholc conducting a Prague production with Beno Blachut in the title role, Helena Tattermuschová as Malinka, Ivo Žídek as Mazal, Karel Berman as Wurfl, and Dalibor Jedlička as the Sacristan. It was performed by English National Opera at the London Coliseum in 1978 directed by Colin Graham, and again in 1992 in a David Pountney production conducted by Sir Charles Mackerras; and by Opera North at the Grand Theatre Leeds in October 2009, in a production by John Fulljames.

Although it had received a concert performance by the San Francisco Opera Ensemble on 23 January 1981, Indiana University's Jacobs School of Music Opera Theater gave the opera its American stage premiere on 23 November 1981 at the 1460-seat Musical Arts Center with Joseph Levitt (tenor), Adda Shur (soprano), Samuel Cook (tenor), Martin Strother (baritone), and Philip Skinner (baritone), conducted by Bryan Balkwill; six performances were given, of which one was videotaped and televised in December. Another 15 years passed until its first professionally staged American performance at the Spoleto Festival U.S.A. in 1996.

The stage premiere of the Ur-version of Brouček (without the excursion to the 15th century) took place at the Janáček Theatre Brno on 19 November 2010 as part of the Janáček Biennale, conducted by Jaroslav Kyzlink, with Jaroslav Březina in the title role.

== Roles ==
Role – In Prague (1888)	Role – On the Moon	Role – In Prague (1420)	Voice type	Premiere Cast, 23 April 1920 (Conductor: – Otakar Ostrčil)
Matěj Brouček, a landlord	Matěj Brouček	Matěj Brouček	Tenor	Mirko Štork
Mazal, a painter	Blankytný, Azurean	Petřík, Pete	Tenor	Miloslav Jeník
Sakristán, Sacristan	Lunobor, Lunigrove	Domšík od Zvonu (Domšík from the Bell)	Bass-Baritone	Vilém Zítek
Málinka, his daughter	Etherea, lunar goddess	Kunka, his daughter	Soprano	Ema Miřiovská
Würfl, a bartender	Čaroskvoucí, Wonderglitter	Kostka, konšel, councillor	Bass	Václav Novák
Číšníček, Young waiter at bar	Zázračné dítě, Child prodigy	Žák, Student	Soprano	
Fanny, Housekeeper	Nourishing Minister	Františka / Kedruta	Mezzo-soprano	
Skladatel, Composer	Harfoboj, Harper	Miroslav, zlatník, the goldsmith	Tenor	
Básník, Poet	Oblačný, Cloudy	Vacek Bradatý (Vacek the Bearded)	Baritone	
		Svatopluk Čech	Baritone	
Guests at "Vikárka"	Delegates of the Moon	Armed Citizens	Chorus	
Spectators	Moonwomen	People, Children	Chorus	

== Synopsis ==
=== Part 1: The Excursions of Mr. Brouček to the Moon ===
==== Scene 1 ====
Mr. Matěj Brouček is a rather unkempt drunken landlord in late 19th-century Prague. On a moonlit night in 1888, Mr. Brouček stumbles down Vikárka street after a drinking binge at the Hradčany tavern. In his impaired state, he encounters Málinka. She is upset and dramatically suicidal after discovering that her lover, Mazál (who happens to be one of Brouček's tenants) has been cheating on her. In an ill-advised attempt to calm Málinka, Brouček agrees to marry her. He quickly realizes the error in this and retracts his offer, leaving Málinka to return to her bohemian lover. Brouček decides he has had enough of this stress and dreams of a more relaxed life on the Moon.

==== Scene 2 ====
Brouček is quickly disillusioned by what he finds in his lunar paradise. He "lands" in the middle of an avant-garde colony of lunar artists and intellectuals, whom the uncultured Brouček clearly despises. He finds himself in the home of an avant-garde artist, Blankytny (a parallel character to Mazál). Blankytny sings a heartfelt ode of platonic love to the lunar maiden, Etherea. This signals the arrival of Etherea and her ‘sisters’ who commence with a song preaching the benefits of a healthy lifestyle. Ironically, Brouček catches the eye of the maiden, who becomes instantly infatuated with the exotic stranger. She whisks him away aboard mythical Pegasus, leaving behind Blankytny in disbelief and despair.

==== Scene 3 ====
Etherea and Brouček land in the Lunar Temple of the Arts, where a group of inhabitants has gathered. They are immediately startled and frightened at the sight of Brouček, but soon see him as the latest vogue. The locals proceed to present Brouček with the latest in lunar art and treat him to a "meal" of sniffing flowers. Brouček is not at all pleased with this display of art, nor is he nourished by the fragrances. He is soon caught sneaking a bite of pork sausage; the crowd quickly turns on him, and he is forced into a furious escape aboard Pegasus. As he flees, the lunar artists sing praises to art.

==== Scene 4 ====
As the Moon scene transforms back into the tavern courtyard in Prague, Mazál and Málinka are returning home, and the artists are enjoying a final drink. A young waiter laughs at the drunken Brouček who is being carried off in a barrel. Málinka is apparently recovered from her turmoil, as she and Mazál sing a duet of their love for each other.

=== Part 2: The Excursions of Mr. Brouček to the 15th Century ===
==== Scene 1 ====
Set in the Castle of Wenceslas IV, Mr. Brouček and his fellow drinkers debate the particulars of the medieval tunnels that were believed to exist beneath the city of Prague. Once again, an inebriated Brouček staggers toward his home and is interrupted. He finds himself somehow in one of these dark tunnels, where he encounters apparitions from the past. One of these ghostly figures is Svatopluk Čech, the author of the Brouček stories and a famous Czech poet. Čech expresses his regret over the decline of moral values in the Czech nation. He sings about the loss of true heroes and yearns for a rebirth of his nation. Ironically, Čech's lament is directed toward Brouček himself and toward the satirical nature of this very opera.

==== Scene 2 ====
Mr. Brouček is transported back in time and finds himself in the Old Town Square in 1420. This is a tumultuous period in 15th-century Prague, when the Czech people, led by Jan Žižka, were under siege by the German armies of the Holy Roman Empire. Brouček is quickly confronted by Hussite rebels, who accuse him of being a German spy, due to his poor Czech grammar laden with German expressions. Brouček somehow convinces the rebels that he is on their side and is allowed to join them.

==== Scene 3 ====
Brouček is brought to the house of Domšik, a sacristan, and his daughter Kunka. Brouček now finds himself in the midst of an impending battle for the future of the Czech nation, signified by the powerful singing of battle hymns by the gathered masses. The rebels ask Brouček to assist in the defense of Prague, to which he is characteristically averse. As the battle begins, our hero flees the scene.

==== Scene 4 ====
In Old Town Square, the people of Prague celebrate their hard-fought victory but lament the death of Domšik. Brouček is found in hiding and accused of treason. He is appropriately sentenced to death by burning...in a beer barrel.

==== Scene 5 ====
Back in 1888 Prague, just outside the Vikárka Inn (Home of the Hradčany Tavern), Mr. Würfl, the landlord of the Inn and the maker of the infamous pork sausage from the Moon, hears moans coming from the cellar. He discovers Mr. Brouček in a beer barrel, visibly relieved to be alive and back home. Brouček boasts to Würfl that he single-handedly liberated the city of Prague.

== Orchestra instrumentation ==
- 4 Flutes (4 piccolo; same players); 2 Oboes; English Horn; 2 Clarinets (Bb); Bass Clarinet; 2 Bassoons; Contrabassoon
- 4 Horns in F; 4 Trumpets in F; 3 Trombones; Tuba
- Bells; Timpani
- Celesta; Dudelsack (German Bagpipe); Harp; Organ
- Violin I, II; Viola; Cello; Double Bass

== Compositional aspects and techniques ==
Janáček's technique of composition in Brouček may not be clearly or easily defined, but there are several aspects that come to the forefront as one begins to look deeper into some of the composer's compositional ideas, regarding both music and speech/language.

=== Motif, motive, and melos ===
The smallest building block of Janáček's later music, including this opera, is the motif. His definition is different from and probably stricter than, what most music scholars might consider as a definition of a motif. Janáček's motifs have a clear beginning and end, and the dynamic is constant throughout the short group of, perhaps, three to five notes. The note values must be equal, and a motif may begin on any beat, but may not end on a downbeat. Janáček's methods of alteration of a motif are varied, but no matter what he does to the melody, the harmony, key, tempo, mode, register, or any of the contextual material, the rhythm remains unaltered, thereby, in his opinion, maintaining the original motif as a recognizable entity. Example 1 (see Musical examples below) shows a motif from Brouček and illustrates some alterations of the same motif. Example 2 is another motif used in the opera. Janáček often employs short musical phrases that extend beyond his unique definition of a motif, creating what Cooper calls a motive.

A motive includes different note values, and its iterations may end on a downbeat. It turns out that most of Janáček's small operatic elements, whether instrumental, vocal, or both, are motives. An example of a motive in Brouček is the use of high violins and flutes punctuating a pedal point a half step apart (Part 1) to indicate the moon up in the heavens where Brouček imagines he can escape from the cares of the world. Although for the most part, motives behave like motifs and are quite similar in their usage, Janáček would have thought of them separately.

A third and larger building block in Brouček is what Dieter Stroebel calls a melos, which describes a segment of music that is longer and more melodious than those of the motif or motive, such as Example 3.

=== Speech and language ===
"The best way of becoming a good opera composer is to study analytically the melodic curves and contours of human speech." – Janáček

It is well known that Janáček's music was greatly influenced by the nature and sounds of Czech speech and language. One may begin to clearly recognize this influence as it appears in the relationship between the musical motif and Czech words. For example, when a word in Czech changes tense, it often changes the sound of the vowel in that word, paralleling Janáček's contour alteration of a short motif. Also, in Czech, the first syllable of a word is stressed, allowing distinction of each word by the beginning sound. The avoidance of ending a motif on the downbeat could be seen as analogous to the fact that Czech speech avoids stress on any syllable other than the first. Third, the final syllable of a Czech word is to receive full value without changing the pitch or weakening the sound. This closely relates to Janáček's idea of maintaining a single dynamic in his motifs. Janáček also had a strong interest in the melody of speech (see quote above): intonation, stress, length, and pitch.

=== Musical ideas in the opera ===
The introduction to Part 1 is not unlike many of Janáček's opera introductions, preludes, or overtures. Made up of several short musical items and motives that will show up later in the opera, the music is propelled by the abrupt juxtaposition of these ideas, which often come in a different order than they will appear throughout the opera proper. There are three melodies of importance in the introduction to Part 1 of Brouček. The first is a light, rhythmically uncertain figure (Example 4) that leads to quickly to the stocky bassoon melody (Example 5), which is a caricature of Brouček. This melody appears many times subsequently and in different forms. The third is the tender melody first introduced by the flute and violins (Example 3), which represents the young lovers Málinka and Mazal. This melody is also altered several times, and there is an allusion to Blankytný (= Mazal) and Etherea (= Málinka) on the moon. All three motives are present in the closing moments of Part 1, an orchestral interlude that brings Brouček back to earth from his dream.

Throughout The Excursion to the Moon, Janáček makes extensive use of waltzes and waltz-like melodies, which were apparently misheard by the Russian composer Dmitri Kabalevsky, who considered them "à la Strauss". However, Janáček's bright and humorous melodies are very different from those of Strauss, as they tend to be much less elegant and often serve the intent of parody or mockery. It is speculated that Janáček also intended the use of waltzes to denote the class of citizen that Brouček represents – the middle-/upper-class dance pointing to the characteristics of the middle-/upper-class Brouček. Even from the opening of the opera, faint allusions of a waltz can be heard between statements of the light 2/4 melody. The prelude dissolves into the opening scene, which begins with the bickering of Málinka and Mazal set to a waltz. A fantastic example of a waltz as a parody is the Child Prodigy's singing of the moon anthem, which actually is a spoof of the Czech national song. The "audience" within the opera hears it as a serious patriotic anthem, while the opera house audience perceives it as a parody anthem. Janáček uses the music of a waltz at the end of the first dream to break the tension of the Moon population's threats against Brouček and help resolve the plot. Many other waltzes can be found in the first part of the opera, some more deliberate than others, and Janáček made very purposeful use of each one as a device to aid in communicating unspoken, often satirical content. Though Janáček frequently uses the waltz in an ironic or parodic light, they seem to flow and function entirely within the musical framework of the opera.

Overall, Part 2 of the opera, The Excursion of Mr. Brouček to the Fifteenth Century, is distinctly different in musical style from Part 1. The starkly different nature of the situations of each part and the several years that separated the actual composition of the two parts are likely reasons for this difference. It opens with jarring rhythms and the sounds of warfare. Two main themes are present in this introduction that reappear in different forms all through Part 2 (Examples 6 and 7). Also present in this part of the opera are Hussite chorales and hymns, one of which can be heard building as Brouček and Domšík go into the Týn Church on the Old Town Square. The chorale then culminates in a proud statement in C major.

One of Janáček's compositional procedures is the significant use of the pitch A♭/G♯ in the last forty minutes of the opera. The key of A♭ minor plays an important role in many of Janáček's compositions, including operas, string quartets, song cycles, piano miniatures, sonatas and orchestral works, no matter whether it is found in comic, tragic, funny, serious, or ironic passages. He preferred to make use of a single tonal area in scenes of steady emotion, or of a single set of characters on stage. This led to his adoption of often assigning a single pitch area to an entire scene, "by which, remarkably, he generates speedy and substantial change and enormous tension and emotion," according to Cooper. Though the listener may not easily recognize the frequent use of the pitch A♭/G♯ as it is clouded by different harmonies, the single pitch plays a crucial role in connecting differing ideas throughout Part 2. Example 8 points to an ill-tempered Brouček leaping up to Ab on his main point. Later in Part 2, as Brouček pleads for mercy during his condemnation scene, he explains that he "wasn't born yet," and that he is "a son of the future," both ending on A♭ (Example 9).

== Critical reception ==
Due to the brevity of his motifs and the way Janáček made use of them and their derivatives, a listener may have difficulty finding something to grasp in the music. Without some study of the score, the logic of his use of motifs and their developments are not aurally so apparent. For this reason, even the well-informed Dmitri Kabalevsky found little in Brouček of which he could sedulously approve.

Some critics have also pointed out that the Moon excursion has a basic flaw in the plot: there is no real "hero" to balance out Brouček, who is the "villain" on the Moon. Richard Bradshaw, who conducted the professional premiere in the United States, said of Brouček, "The two ‘excursions’ have been described as one flawed masterpiece made up of two operas."

== Recordings ==
- Fritz Wunderlich, Kurt Böhme, Wilma Lipp, Kieth Engen, Antonie Fahberg, Lilian Benningsen, Paul Kuen, Karl Ostertag, Bayerisches Staatsorchester, Chor der Bayerischen Staatsoper, Joseph Keilberth, conductor; 19 November 1959, live recording, Orfeo-C354942I (German): 1994.
- Bohumír Vích, Libuše Domanínská, Helena Tattermuschová, Ivo Žídek, Milan Karpíšek, Beno Blachut, Karel Berman, Přemysl Kočí, Orchestra and Chorus of the Prague National Theatre; Václav Neumann, conductor, Supraphon SUA ST 50531/3 (LP issue): 1962.
- Vilém Přibyl, Richard Novák, Karel Hanuš, Libuše Márová, Jaroslav Tománek, Miroslav Švejda, Vladimír Krejčík, Jiří Olejníček, Jaroslav Souček, Jana Jonášová, Jiřina Marková, Bohuslav Maršík; Czech Philharmonic Orchestra and Chorus; František Jílek, conductor; Supraphon 1116 3291-3: 1980.
- Jan Vacík, Peter Straka, Roman Janál, Maria Haan, Zdeněk Plech, BBC Singers, BBC Symphony Orchestra; Jiří Bělohlávek, conductor; Deutsche Grammophon 477 7387: 2008.
- Jaroslav Březina, Aleš Briscein, Doubravka Součková, František Zahradníček, Alžběta Poláčková, Jiří Sulženko, Roman Janál, Josef Moravec, Prague National Theatre Chorus & Orchestra, Jaroslav Kyzlink; Supraphon SU 4339-2, recorded 2020

== Musical examples ==
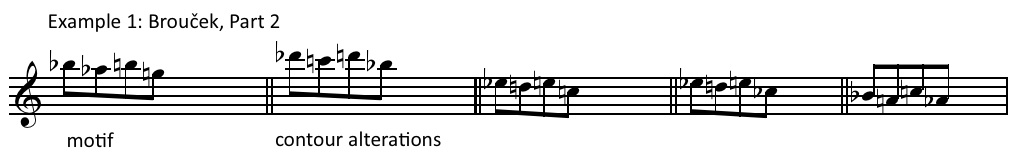
Example 1

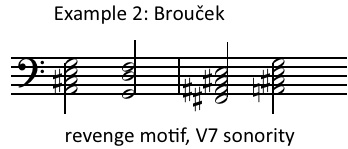
Example 2

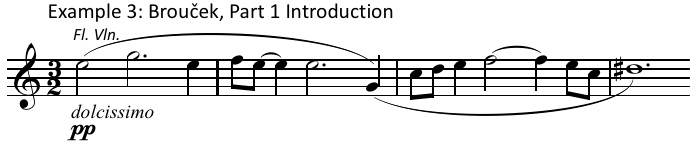
Example 3

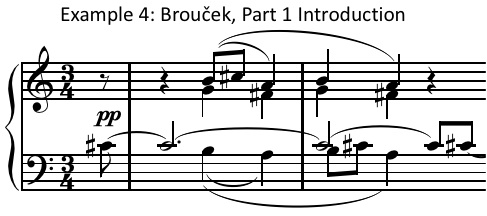
Example 4

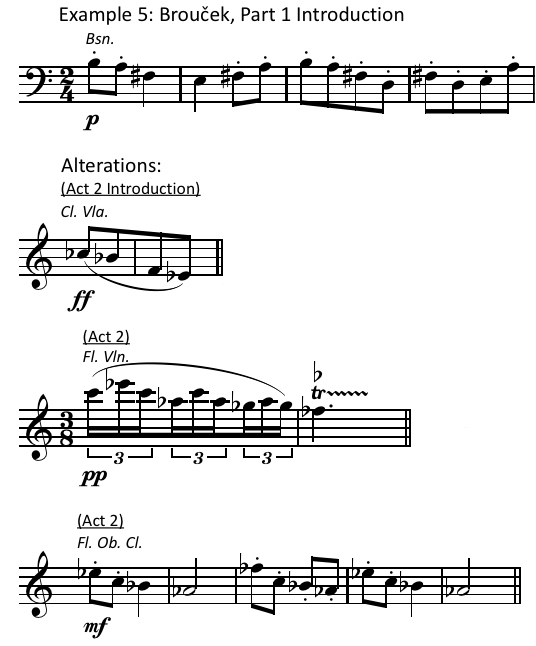
Example 5

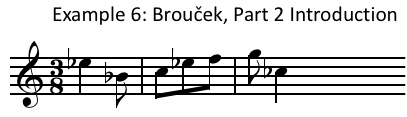
Example 6

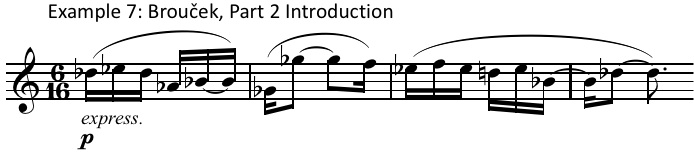
Example 7

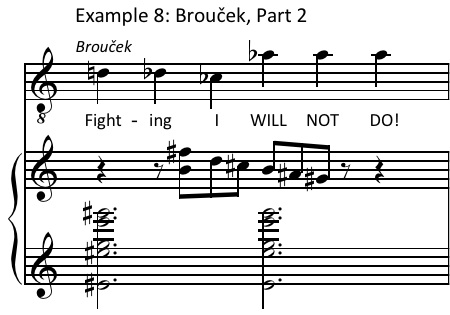
Example 8

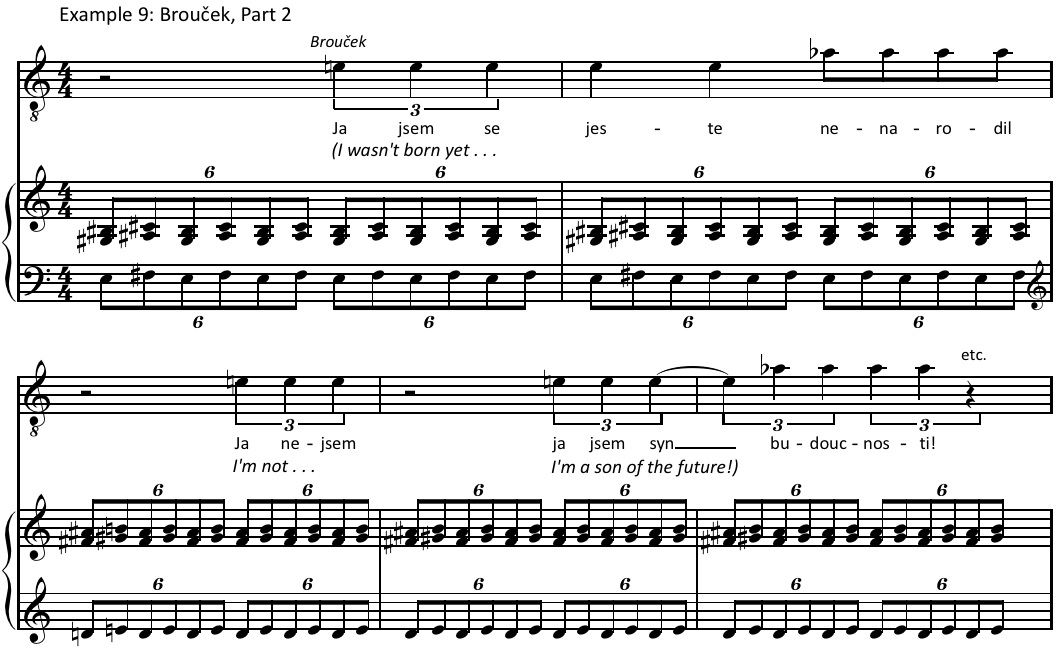
Example 9

== Arrangements ==
1. Arrangement suitable for Opera
  - arrangement for new German libretto
  - arrangement by: Karlheinz Gutheim
  - performed by: Soloists, Bavarian State Opera Orchestra, co Joseph Keilberth
2. Arrangement suitable for Opera
  - arrangement for orchestral suite from the opera
  - arrangement by: Jaroslav Smolka and Jiří Zahrádka
  - performed by: Prague Symphony Orchestra, co Jiří Bělohlávek
3. Arrangement suitable for Opera
  - arrangement for orchestral suite from the opera
  - arrangement by: Peter Breiner
  - performed by: New Zealand Symphony Orchestra, co Peter Breiner
