= Intolleranza 1960 =

Opera

- Opera by Luigi Nono
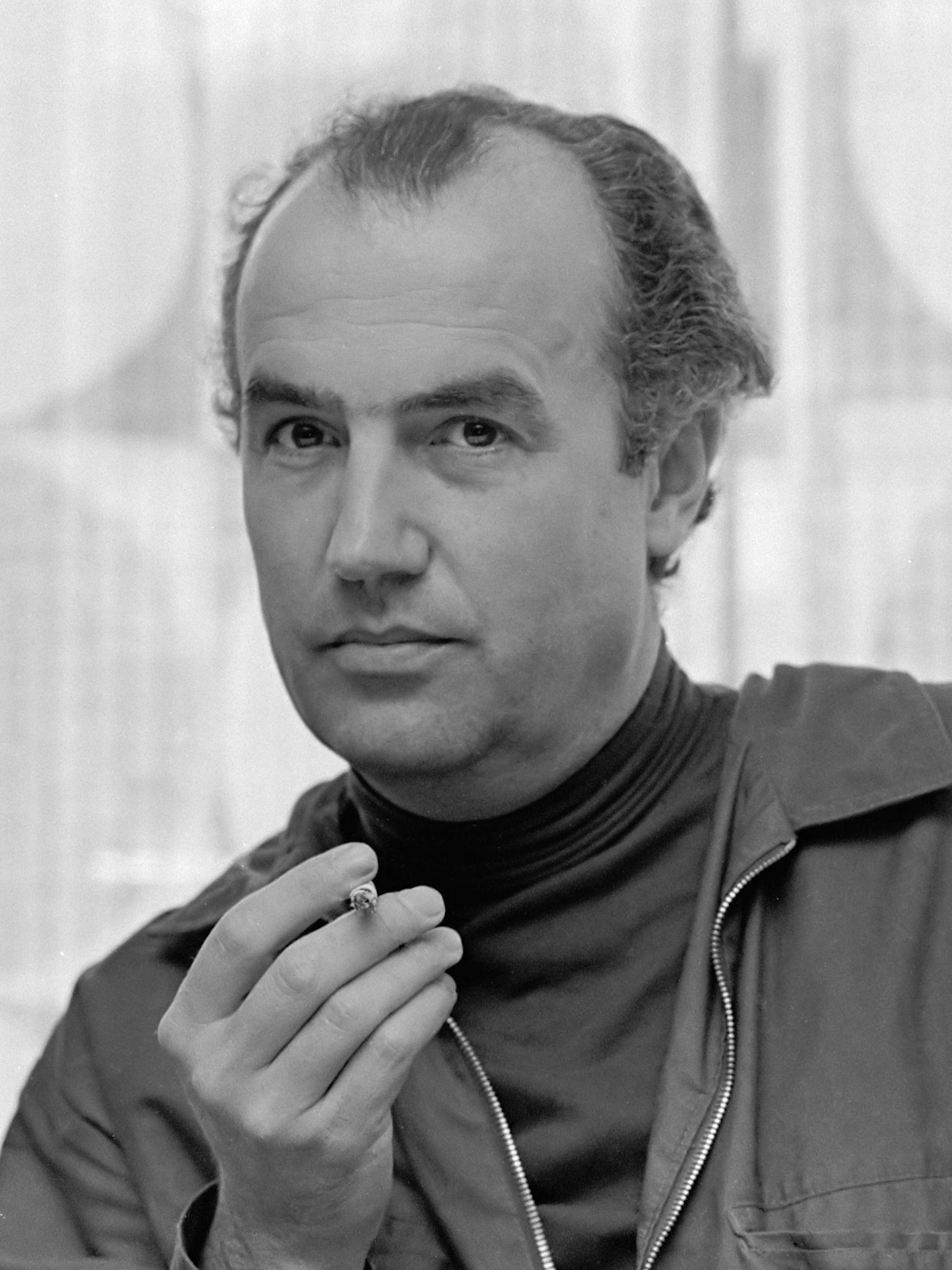
- Nono 1970
- Other title: Intolleranza
- Librettist: Nono
- Language: Italian
- Premiere: 13 April 1961; La Fenice, Venice

Intolleranza 1960 (Intolerance 1960) is a one-act opera in two parts (azione scenica in due tempi) by Luigi Nono, and is dedicated to his father-in-law, Arnold Schoenberg. The Italian libretto was written by Nono from an idea by Angelo Maria Ripellino, using documentary texts and poetry by Julius Fučík, Reportage unter dem Strang geschrieben [reportage written under the gallows]; Henri Alleg, "La question" ("The Torture"); Jean-Paul Sartre's introduction to Alleg's poem; Paul Éluard's poem "Liberté"; "Our march" by Vladimir Mayakovsky; and Bertolt Brecht's "To Posterity" ("An die Nachgeborenen").

The plot concerns a migrant, who travels from Southern Italy looking for work. Along the way, he encounters protests, arrests and torture. He ends up in a concentration camp, where he experiences the gamut of human emotions. He reaches a river, and realises that everywhere is his home.

The opera premiered on 13 April 1961 at the Teatro La Fenice in Venice. It has a running time of approximately one hour and fifteen minutes.

== Background and performance history ==
Intolleranza 1960 was Luigi Nono's first work for the opera stage and is a flaming protest against intolerance and oppression and the violation of human dignity. The year in the title refers to the time of the work's origin. Nono himself said of this work that it "did mark a beginning for me, but in no sense did it constitute a tabula rasa or in response to 'divine inspiration'". It was commissioned for the 1961 Venice Biennale by its director Mario Labroca. The first performance was conducted by Bruno Maderna on 13 April 1961 at the Teatro La Fenice in Venice. The stage design was by the radical painter Emilio Vedova, a friend of Nono's. The premiere was disrupted by neo-fascists, who shouted Viva la polizia during the torture scene. Nono's opponents accused him of poisoning Italian music. (Nono revised the work into a one-act version for a 1974 performance.) A performance by the Boston Opera in 1964 was suppressed by the John Birch Society and other right-wing activists. It was subsequently presented the following year, with Maderna conducting Sarah Caldwell's production, with Beverly Sills in the cast.

Fabrice Fitch has commented that this work has "no plot as such", but rather consists of a series of scenes that illustrate aspects of intolerance. Nono himself interpreted the testimony of his work as follows:

Intolleranza 1960 is the awakening of human awareness in a man who has rebelled against the demands of necessity – an emigrant miner – and searches for a reason and a "human" base for life. After several experiences of intolerance and domination, he is beginning to rediscover human relations, between himself and others, when he is swept away in a flood with other people. There remains his certainty in "a time when one wants to be a help to you". Symbol? Report? Fantasy? All three, in a story of our time.

According to the publisher Schott, the "title of the work has been altered from Intolleranza 1960 to Intolleranza in order to emphasize the timelessness of the composition."

== Roles ==
Roles, voice types, premiere cast
Role	Voice type	Premiere cast, 13 April 1961 Conductor: Bruno Maderna
A Migrant	tenor	Petre Munteanu
His Companion	soprano	Catherine Gayer
A Woman	contralto	Carla Henius
An Algerian	baritone	Heinz Rehfuss
A Torture Victim	bass	Italo Tajo
Four Policemen	actors	
Chorus of Miners, Demonstrators, Tortured, Prisoners, Refugees, Algerians, Farmers

== Synopsis ==
Setting: Fictional place in the present

=== Part one ===
Opening chorus (Coro iniziale)

Instead of an overture, a large-scale a cappella chorus, "Live and be vigilant", is heard from behind a closed curtain.

1st scene: In a mining village

A migrant is tired of the hard work in the mines in a foreign land. He is consumed by desire to return to his homeland from which he once fled.

2nd scene: A woman rushes in

A woman who had given the stranger in the mining village warmth and peace and love, tries to persuade him to stay. When she realizes that her lover is determined to go, she insults him and swears revenge. Nevertheless, she leaves with the migrant.

3rd scene: In a city

He has reached a city while a large unauthorized peace demonstration is taking place. The police intervene and arrest some demonstrators, including the migrant, although he was not participating in the rally. His attempt to defend himself remains unsuccessful.

4th scene: in a police station

Four police officers set to work to force the prisoners to confess. The man, however, stands firm to his story that he was on the way to his home, which goes through the city, and he therefore had nothing to confess.

5th scene: The torture

All those arrested are brought to torture. The chorus of the tortured cries to the audience, asking whether it was deaf and would behave just like cattle in the pen of shame.

6th scene: In a concentration camp

The chorus of prisoners desperately cries for freedom. The four policemen taunt their victims. The hero makes friends with another prisoner from Algeria. They plan to escape together.

7th scene: After the escape

The migrant manages to escape with the Algerians from the concentration camp. While originally it had been only his wish to see his home, now his heart burns only with the desire for freedom.

=== Part two ===
1st scene: Some absurdities of contemporary life

From all sides voices press upon the hero, voices which not only disturb and confuse him, but almost overpower him. The absurdities of contemporary life, such as the bureaucracy – for example, "registration required", "Documents are the soul of the state", "certify, authenticate, notarize" – and sensational newspaper headlines like "mother of thirteen children was a man" increase, and the scene ends with a big explosion.

2nd scene: a meeting between a refugee and his companion

A silent crowd suffers from the impression of the slogans and the explosion. When a woman begins to speak out against war and disaster, it appears to the emigrant as a source of hope in his solitude. Henceforth, the two want to fight together for a better world.

3rd scene: Projections of episodes of terror and fanaticism

To the hero appears the woman he has left in the mining village, and this confuses him. Together with his companion (compagna) he sends her away. Then the woman transforms herself along with a group of fanatics into ghosts and shadows. In the dream, she sees the migrant, the mine, the mocking slogan Arbeit macht frei over the entrance of the camp, and she sees the nightmares of the intolerance he holds with his companion, "Never, never again". The choir sings Mayakovsky's "Our march".

4th scene: In the vicinity of a village on the banks of a great river

The hero and his companion have reached the great river, which forms the border of his native country. It is flooding; its level increases more and more. The deluge swallows roads, broken bridges, barracks, and crushes houses. Even the migrant and his companion are unable to save themselves. They die an agonizing death.

Final chorus (Coro finale) set to excerpts from Brecht's poem "To Posterity", again without orchestral accompaniment.

== Recordings ==
- Teldec 4509 97304(2) German version by Alfred Andersch: Chorus of the Stuttgart State Opera; Stuttgart State Orchestra; Bernhard Kontarsky, conductor (1993)
- Dreyer Gaido CD 21030: Chorus and extra chorus of Theater Bremen; Bremer Philharmoniker; Gabriel Feltz, conductor (2001)
