= Lovosice =

- Town
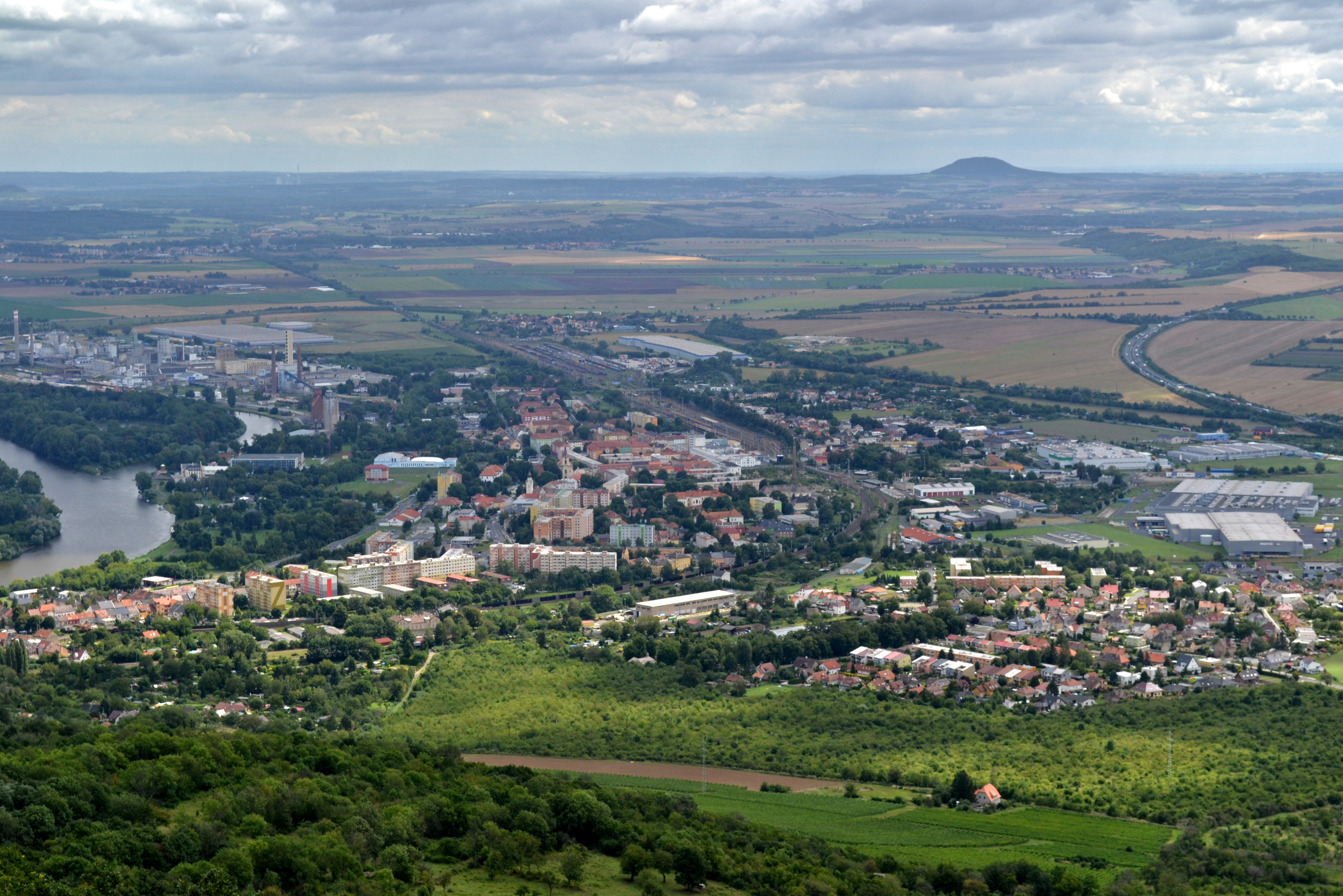
- Lovosice seen from Lovoš mountain

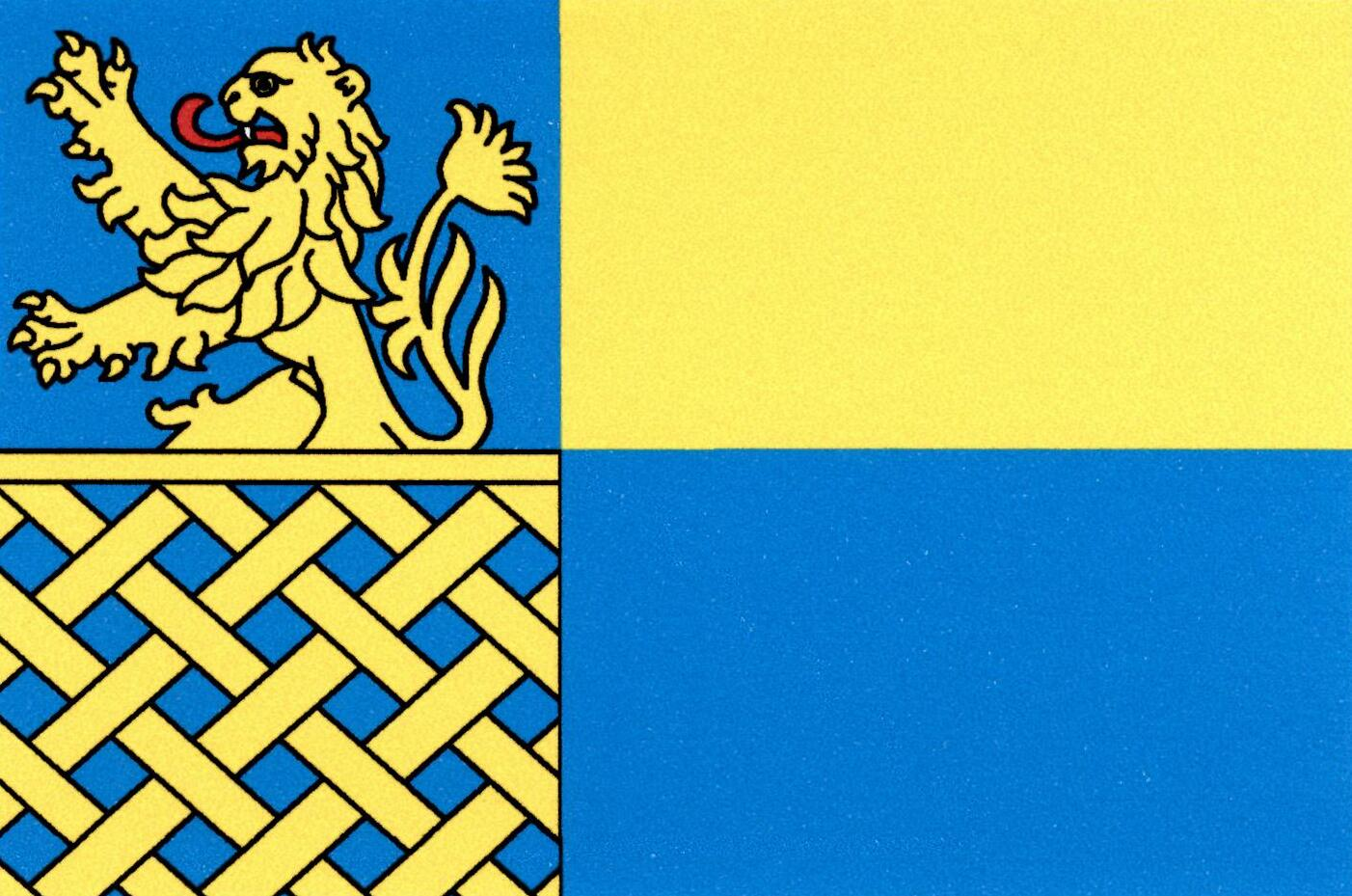
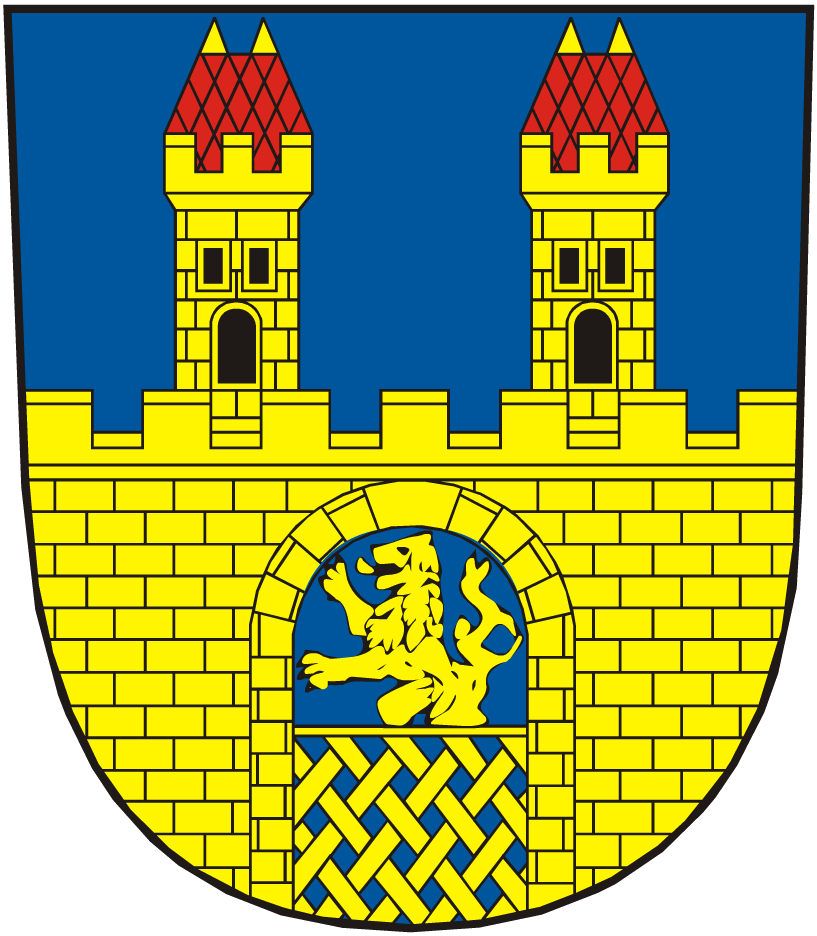
- Flag Coat of arms

- Location in the Czech Republic
- Coordinates: 50°30′54″N 14°3′4″E
- Country: Czech Republic
- Region: Ústí nad Labem
- District: Litoměřice
- First mentioned: 1237

Government
  - Mayor: Vojtěch Krejčí

Area
  - Total: 11.89 km^{2} (4.59 sq mi)
- Elevation: 151 m (495 ft)

Population (2026-01-01)
  - Total: 8,744
  - Density: 735.4/km^{2} (1,905/sq mi)
- Time zone: UTC+1 (CET)
  - Summer (DST): UTC+2 (CEST)
- Postal code: 410 30
- Website: www.meulovo.cz

Lovosice (Czech pronunciation: [ˈlovosɪtsɛ]; German: Lobositz) is a town in Litoměřice District in the Ústí nad Labem Region of the Czech Republic. It has about 8,700 inhabitants. Located on the Elbe River, the town is a transport hub and is known for its chemical, engineering and food-processing industries.

== Etymology ==
The name is derived from the personal name Lovos, meaning "the village of Lovos' people".

== Geography ==
Lovosice is located about 6 kilometres (4 mi) southwest of Litoměřice and 16 km (10 mi) south of Ústí nad Labem. It lies mostly in the Lower Ohře Table. A small northwestern part of the municipal territory extends into the Central Bohemian Uplands and includes the highest point of Lovosice, which is a contour line at the foot of the Lovoš mountain at 310 m (1,017 ft) above sea level.

The town is situated on the left bank of the Elbe River, which forms the northern municipal border.

== History ==
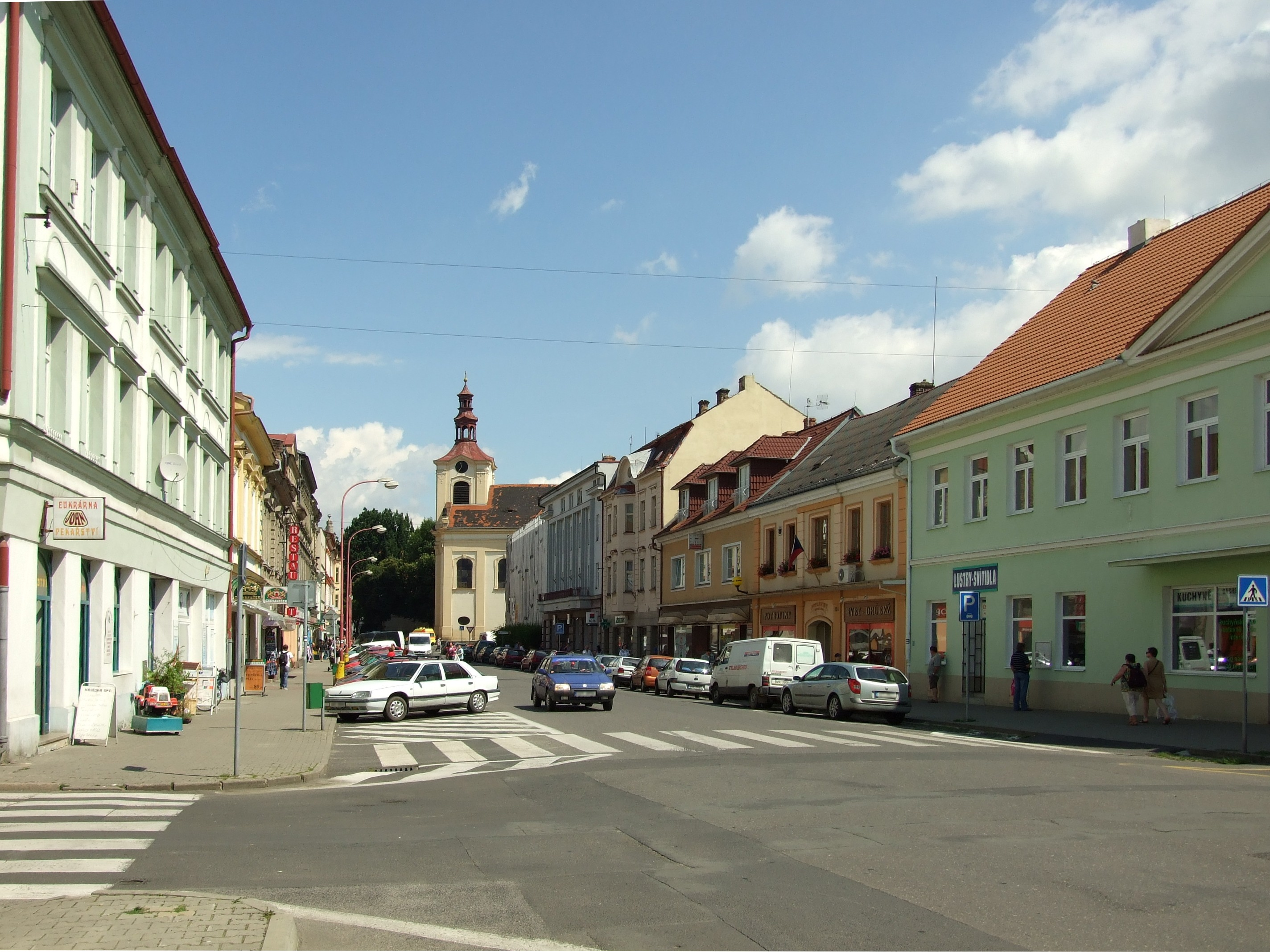
8. května Street with the Church of Saint Wenceslaus

The region of Lovosice was already inhabited during the Bronze Age. Some evidence indicates that the first Czechs lived here.

The first written mention of Lovosice is from 1143, when Duke Vladislaus II gave the village to the Strahov Monastery. However, this is not a verified document. The first reliable mention of Lovosice is from 1237. Emperor Rudolf II promoted it to a town in 1600.

Almost half of the town was destroyed during the Thirty Years' War. By 1713, the destroyed part of the town was restored, but Lovosice remained economically stagnant. Lovosice was the site of a major battle between Prussia and the Habsburg Empire in 1756, known as the Battle of Lobositz. In 1850, a railway was built, which supported the industrialisation of the town and accelerated development.

During World War II, due to the Munich Agreement, Lovosice was annexed by Nazi Germany and administered as part of the Reichsgau Sudetenland. Only 600 Czechs stayed in the town at that time. After the war, the German population was expelled as a result of the Beneš decrees.

== Demographics ==
Historical population

Year	Pop.	±%
1869	3,739	—
1880	4,852	+29.8%
1890	4,838	−0.3%
1900	5,166	+6.8%
1910	5,714	+10.6%

Year	Pop.	±%
1921	5,643	−1.2%
1930	6,572	+16.5%
1950	5,708	−13.1%
1961	8,160	+43.0%
1970	9,735	+19.3%

Year	Pop.	±%
1980	10,449	+7.3%
1991	9,708	−7.1%
2001	9,312	−4.1%
2011	8,623	−7.4%
2021	8,646	+0.3%

Source: Censuses

== Economy ==
Lovosice is known as an industrial town with a long tradition of chemical and food-processing industries. The main industrial employers with headquarters in Lovosice are TRCZ (a manufacturer of parts for motor vehicles) and Lovochemie (a manufacturer of fertilisers), both with more than 500 employees. The chemical industry is also represented by a branch of Indorama Ventures.

== Transport ==
Lovosice is a significant transport junction. Besides a cargo port on the Elbe River, the town has a great connection to Prague and Germany via the D8 motorway.

Lovosice is located on the railway lines Prague–Děčín, Most–Litoměřice and Litoměřice–Chotiměř. The town is served by four train stations: Lovosice, Lovosice-město, Lovosice závod and Lovosice zastávka.

== Sights ==
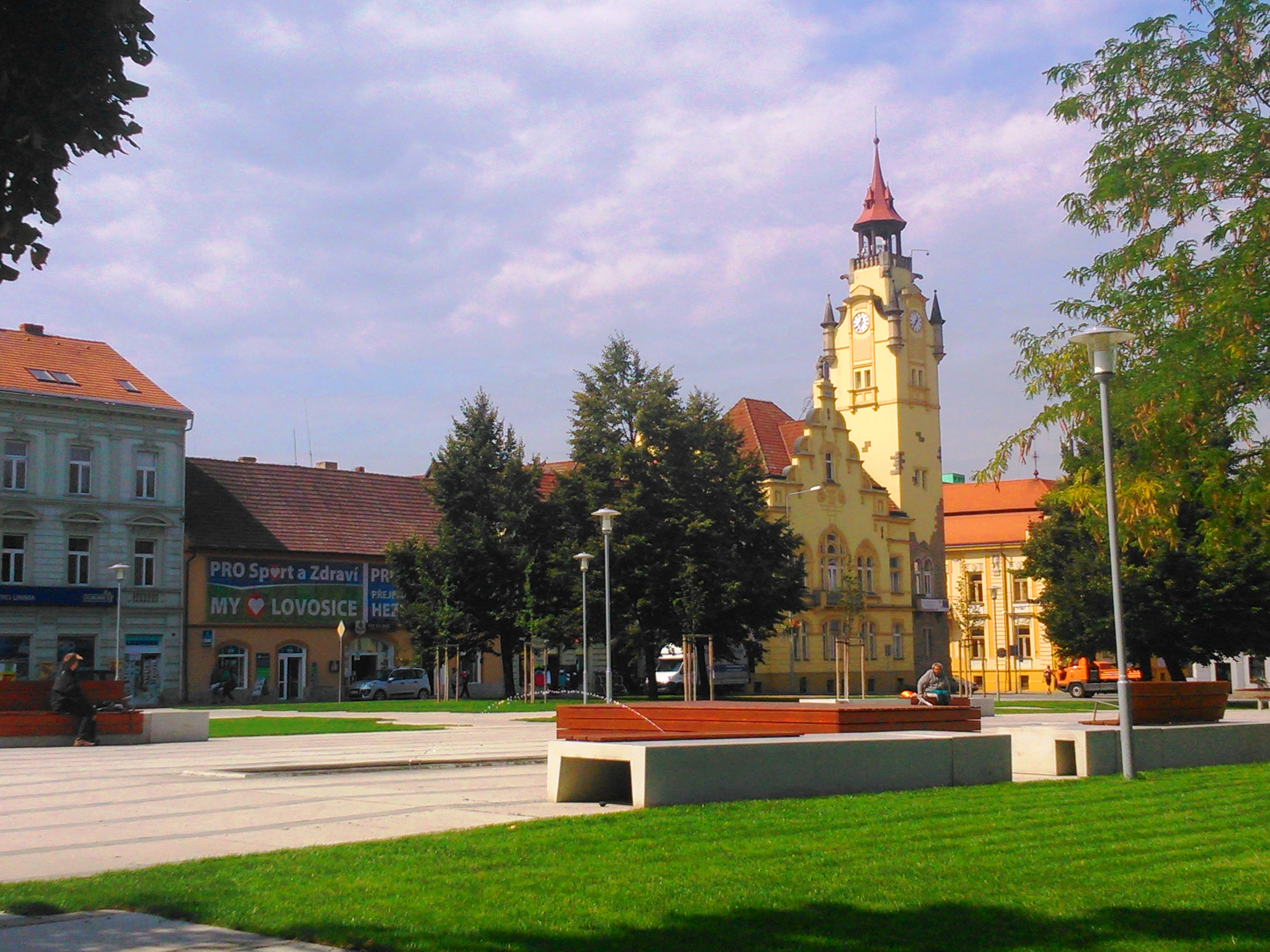
Former town hall on the town square

The main landmark of Lovosice is the Church of Saint Wenceslaus. It was built in the Baroque style in 1733–1748, on the site of the former wooden church. It contains valuable frescoes with Saint Wenceslaus.

The Renaissance castle in Lovosice was probably built during the rule of Jiří od Šlejnice between 1548 and 1565. in 1608–1612, it was decorated with frescoes. The early Baroque reconstruction took place probably in 1655–1664. After a fire in 1809, it was reconstructed to its current form with a Neoclassical façade. The building then served as an office. Since 1960, a secondary vocational school has been in the building.

The former town hall is one of the most significant buildings in the town. It was built in the Art Nouveau style in 1906–1907. Today it houses offices of medical doctors.

== Notable people ==
- Karl von Czyhlarz (1833–1914), Czech-Austrian jurist and politician
- Alfons Dopsch (1868–1953), Austrian historian

== Twin towns – sister cities ==
Lovosice is twinned with:

- Coswig, Germany
