= Karel Moor =

Karel Moor (sometimes written Karl Moór, also Mohr; 26 December 1873 – 30 March 1945) was a Czech composer, conductor and choirmaster. Moor is a representative of late Romanticism both in his choice of themes and in his musical treatment. Although he was a very prolific composer, most of his works are now forgotten. Only the operetta Pan profesor v pekle and the orchestral composition Česká suite have survived in the popular canon.

== Early life and education ==
Karel Moor was born on 26 December 1873 in Lázně Bělohrad, Bohemia, Austria-Hungary. He graduated from the Prague Organ School. He then studied singing, first in Vienna, where he took the state singing examination in 1896, and later went to Castelli in Trieste for further lessons.

== Career ==
He started as a singing teacher in Pardubice and at that time also began to compose. After a short stay in Prague, where his works (the symphonic poem Polonia and Polish Dances) were first publicly performed, he worked in Trieste. After returning to Bohemia, he became first conductor of the Czech Philharmonic and later second conductor of the National Theatre in Brno. In 1908, his operetta Pan profesor v pekle (The Professor in Hell) was also performed in this theatre.

He was apparently of a very restless nature, as in the following years he had many engagements with various musical ensembles, especially in Yugoslavia (Zadar, Arbanas, Belgrade, Štip in Macedonia, briefly back in Moravian Ostrava and Pilsen, then again in Sinje in Dalmatia and Sarajevo). In 1923 he returned to Prague, where he settled. He became a bandleader at the Hvězda cinema, a conductor at the Smíchov Arena, a choirmaster of the Women's Choir and finally an instrumentalist for the Czechoslovak Radio.

== Death and legacy ==
He died on 30 March 1945 in Prague. He was first buried on 5 April 1945 in the cemetery in Vršovice, and on 7 October 1945, at the composer's request, his remains were placed in the cemetery in Byšičky near his hometown of Lázně Bělohrad. The burial in Byšičky is recorded in the manuscript chronicle of Lázně Bělohrad and in reports in local magazines.

A book, "Karel Moor. "Musicista migrante" nella Mitteleuropa del '900, dalla Praga di Antonín Dvořák alla Trieste di Italo Svevo fino ai nuovi Paesi slavi del Sud", (tr. "Karel Moor: A "Migrant Musician" in 20th-Century Central Europe—From Antonín Dvořák's Prague to Italo Svevo’s Trieste, and Onward to the New South Slavic Nations"), edited by Massimo Favento, was published by Lumen Harmonicum in 2019.

A learned discussion between Ivano Cavallini and Massimo Favento in February 2020, carried the title "Karel Moor, il Dvořák dell'Adriatico" (tr. "Karel Moor, the Dvořák of the Adriatic").

Karel Moor's birthplace was located on the square in Lázně Bělohrad, where a memorial plaque was unveiled on 25 March 2000.

== Awards and honours ==
The municipal council of Lázně Bělohrad named Karel Moor an honorary citizen of the town.

== Selected works ==
=== Orchestral compositions ===
- Serenade in E♭ major (1897)
- Carnival (1897)
- České posvícení (Czech Christmas Eve) (1897)
- Polish Dances (1897)
- Polonia (1897)
- Tkalci (The Weavers) (1904)
- Potopa (The Flood) (1908)
- Česká suita (Czech Suite) (1926)
- Bělohradská suita (The Belgrade Suite) (1928)
- Moře (Sea)
- Requiem (tribute to B. Smetana)

=== Melodramas ===
- Maryčka Magdónova (Petr Bezruč – 1905 )
- Cantor Halfar (Petr Bezruč – 1919 )
- Horská růže (Mountain Rose) ( Jiri Wolker )
- Tylův sen (Tyl's Dream) (Em. Brožík)
- Vidění Anežčino (Vision of Agnes) (JM Vochoč)
- Vítězům (To the winners) (Otčenášek)
- Utrpení Boha (The Suffering of God) (Opočenský)
- Kde domov můj (Where is my home) (R. Mařík, P. Springer)
- Slovak ballad (Karel Václav Rais)

=== Cantatas and oratorios ===
- Saint Wenceslas (1934)
- Canticum fratris solis (1943)

=== Operas ===
- Rispa (based on Zeyer's legend, libretto by Karel B. Englich – 1898)
- Vij (based on Gogol, libretto by František Khol – 1903)
- Hjördis (libretto by František Khol, based on Ibsen – 1905 )
- Panské právo (Manorial Law) (libretto by Davorin Žunković – 1914 to 1916)
- William Ratcliff (lost)
- Mistr Hanuš (Master Hanuš) (1924)
- Poslední akord (The Last Chord) (episode from the life of W.A. Mozart, libretto by Leo Pohl – 1930)

=== Operettas ===
- Pan profesor v pekle (The Professor in Hell) (1898)
- Výlet pana Broučka do Měsíce (Mr. Brouček's Trip to the Moon) (after Svatopluk Čech, libretto by V. Merhaut – 1909)
- Vlkodlak (The Werewolf) (D. Žunkovič – 1908)
- Snezka (Snow White) (1922)
- Děti práce (Children of Labor) (J. Balda – 1925)
- Svatební valčík (Wedding Waltz) (1931)
- W. A. Mozart (1934)

=== Ballets ===
- Golem (The Golem) (1929)
- Pan (1929)

He also composed over a hundred songs, four masses and numerous chamber pieces.
