= Julius Fučík (journalist) =

Czech journalist and resistance fighter

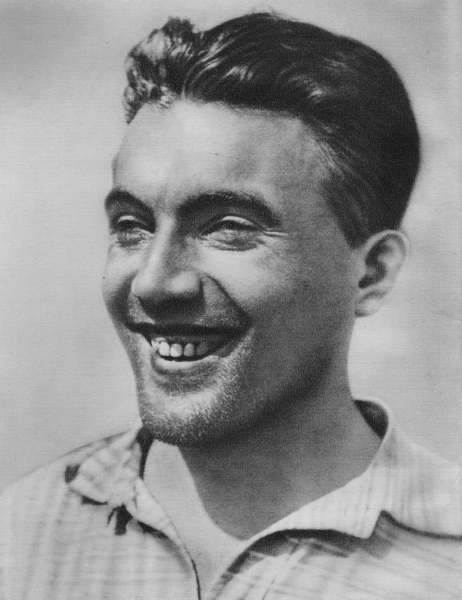
- Julius Fučík
- Born: Julius Jaroslav Fučik; 23 February 1903; Prague, Austria-Hungary
- Died: 8 September 1943 (aged 40); Plötzensee Prison, Berlin, Nazi Germany
- Citizenship: Austrian, Czechoslovak
- Education: Faculty of Arts, Charles University
- Occupations: Journalist and literary critic
- Spouse: Gusta Fučíková
- Writing career
- Notable work: Notes from the Gallows
- Notable awards: Honorary International Peace Prize (1950)

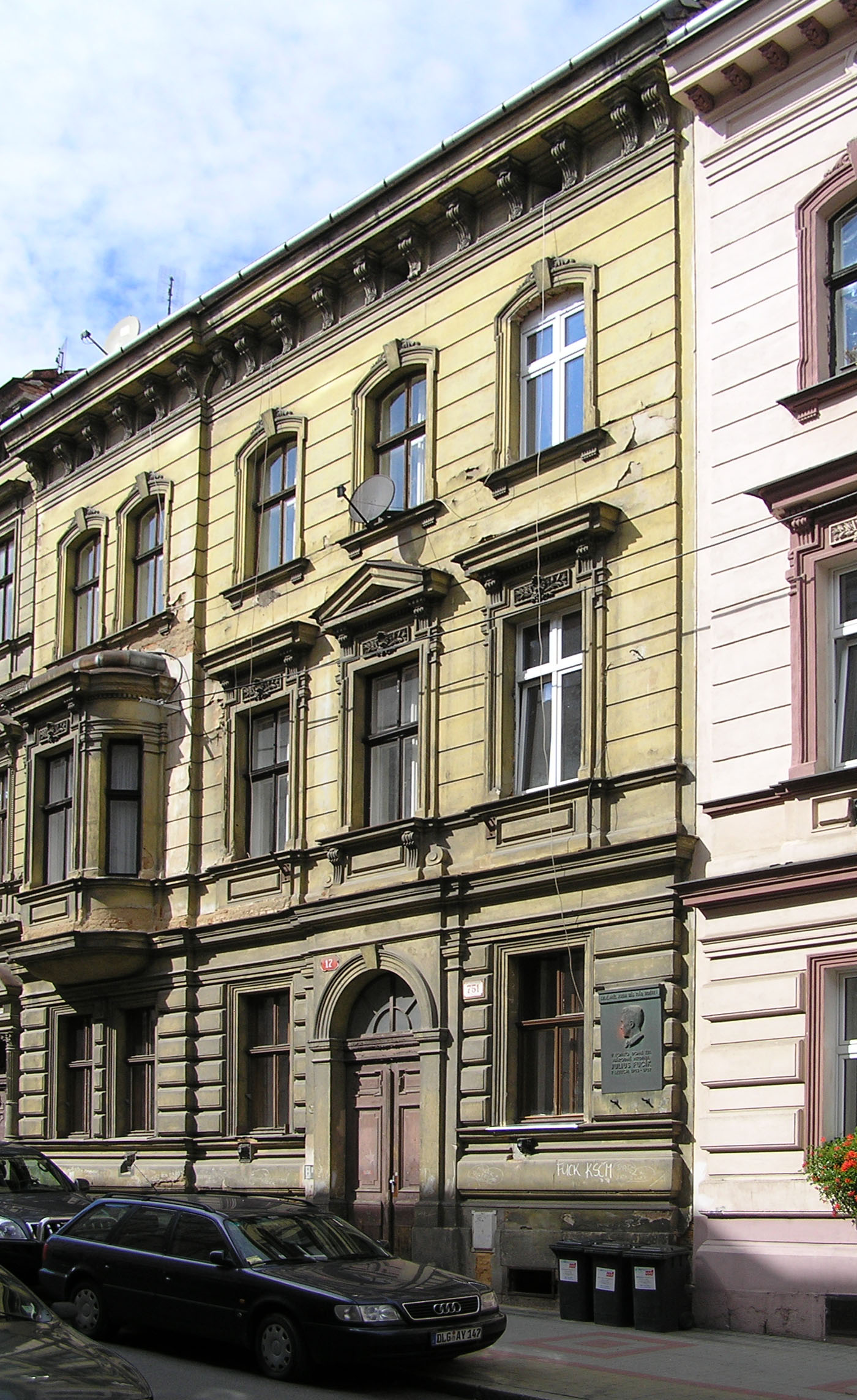
The house in Plzeň where Fučík lived, 1913–1937

Julius Jaroslav Fučik (Czech: [ˈjulɪjus ˈfutʃiːk]; 23 February 1903 – 8 September 1943) was a Czech journalist, critic, writer, and active member of Communist Party of Czechoslovakia. For his part at the forefront of the anti-Nazi resistance during the Second World War, he was imprisoned and tortured by the Gestapo in Prague, and executed in Berlin.

While in prison, Fučík recorded his interrogation experiences on small pieces of paper, which were smuggled out and published after the war as Notes from the Gallows. The book established Fučík as a symbol of resistance to oppression, as well as an icon of communist propaganda.

== Early life ==
Julius Fučík was born into a working-class family in Prague. His father was a steelworker and opera singer. His uncle and namesake was the composer Julius Fučík. In 1913, Fučík moved with his family from Prague to Plzeň (Pilsen) where he attended the state vocational high school. As a twelve-year-old boy, he was planning to establish a newspaper named Slovan (The Slav). He showed himself to be interested in both politics and literature. As a teenager he frequently acted in local amateur theatre.

== Journalism and politics ==
In 1920 he took up study in Prague and joined the Czechoslovak Social Democratic Workers' Party, through which he was later to find himself swept up in the left-wing current. In May 1921 this wing founded the Communist Party of Czechoslovakia (CPC). Fučík then first wrote cultural contributions for the local Plzeň CPC newspaper.

After completing his studies, Fučík found a position as an editor with the literary newspaper Kmen ("Stem"). Within the CPC he became responsible for cultural work. From 1926, he was a member of the literary and artistic group Devětsil. In 1929, he helped the creation of its more politically motivated successor, Left Front.

In 1929, he went to literary critic František Xaver Šalda's magazine Tvorba ("Creation"). He constantly worked on the CPC newspaper Rudé právo ("Red Right") and several other journals. During this time Fučík was arrested repeatedly by the Czechoslovak Secret Police, managing to avoid an eight-month prison sentence in 1934.

In 1930, he visited the Soviet Union for four months, including the Czechoslovak collectivist colony Interhelpo in Central Asia, and painted a very positive picture of the situation there in the book V zemi, kde zítra již znamená včera ("In a Land, Where Tomorrow is Already Yesterday", published in 1932). Fučík supported collectivization and dekulakization, praised the successes of industrialization, and emphasized the temporary nature of all difficulties. Having visited the USSR on the eve of the Holodomor of 1932-1933, he categorically supported the policy of the Soviet regime.

In July 1934, just after Adolf Hitler had suppressed the SA, he visited Bavaria and described his experiences in Cesta do Mnichova ("The Road to Munich"). He went to the Soviet Union again in 1934, this time for two years, and wrote reports, which again worked to support the Party's strength. After his return, there were heated arguments with authors such as Jiří Weil and Jan Slavík, who criticized developments under Joseph Stalin. Fučík took the Stalinist side and criticized such statements critical of Stalin as fatal to the CPC.

In 1938, Fučík married Augusta Kodeřičová, later known as Gusta Fučíková.

In the wake of the Munich Conference, the Prague government disbanded the CPC in September 1938 and the CPC went underground. After Nazi Germany's troops invaded Czechoslovakia in March 1939, Fučík moved to his parents' house in Chotiměř (Litoměřice District) and published in civilian newspapers, especially about historical and literary topics. He also started to work for the now underground CPC. In 1940 the Gestapo started to search for him in Chotiměř because of his cooperation with the CPC, and so he decided to move back to Prague.

Beginning early in 1941, he belonged to the CPC's Central Committee. He provided handbills and tried to publish the Communist Party newspaper Rudé Právo regularly. On 24 April 1942 he and six others were arrested in Prague by the Gestapo, probably rather coincidentally during a police raid. Although Fučík had two guns at the time, he did not use them. The only survivor of the incident, Riva Friedová-Krieglová, said in the 1990s that Fučík had orders to shoot himself to avoid capture.

== Notes from the Gallows ==
Julius Fučík's Notes from the Gallows, first uncensored Czech edition, 1995

Fučík was initially detained in Pankrác Prison in Prague, where he was interrogated and tortured. During this time he composed Notes from the Gallows (Czech: Reportáž psaná na oprátce, literally Reports Written Under the Noose), by writing on pieces of cigarette paper and smuggling them out with the help of sympathetic prison wardens named Kolínský and Hora.

The book describes events in the prison and is filled with hope for a communist future. He also details mental resistance techniques to help withstand torture, which have since been used by activists around the world.

In the original edition, certain passages that jarred with common notions of heroic resistance were omitted. A later edition, published in 1995, restored the missing text.

Although the work's authenticity has been contested, a forensic analysis by the Prague Institute of Criminalistics found the manuscript to be genuine.

== Trial and death ==
In May 1943 Fučík was brought to Germany. He was first detained in Bautzen for somewhat more than two months, and afterwards in Berlin. On 25 August 1943 in Berlin, he was accused of high treason in connection with his political activities by the Volksgerichtshof, which was presided over by the notorious Roland Freisler.

Fučík was found guilty and was sentenced to death along with Jaroslav Klecan, who had been arrested with Fučík. Fučík was hanged two weeks later on 8 September 1943 in Plötzensee Prison in Berlin, not beheaded as is often stated.

After the war, his wife, Gusta Fučíková, who had also been in a Nazi concentration camp, researched and retrieved all of his prison writings. She edited them with help of CPC and published them as Notes from the Gallows in 1947. The book was successful, and its influence increased after the Soviet takeover of Czechoslovakia in 1948. It has been translated into at least 90 languages.

== Fučík as an ideological symbol ==
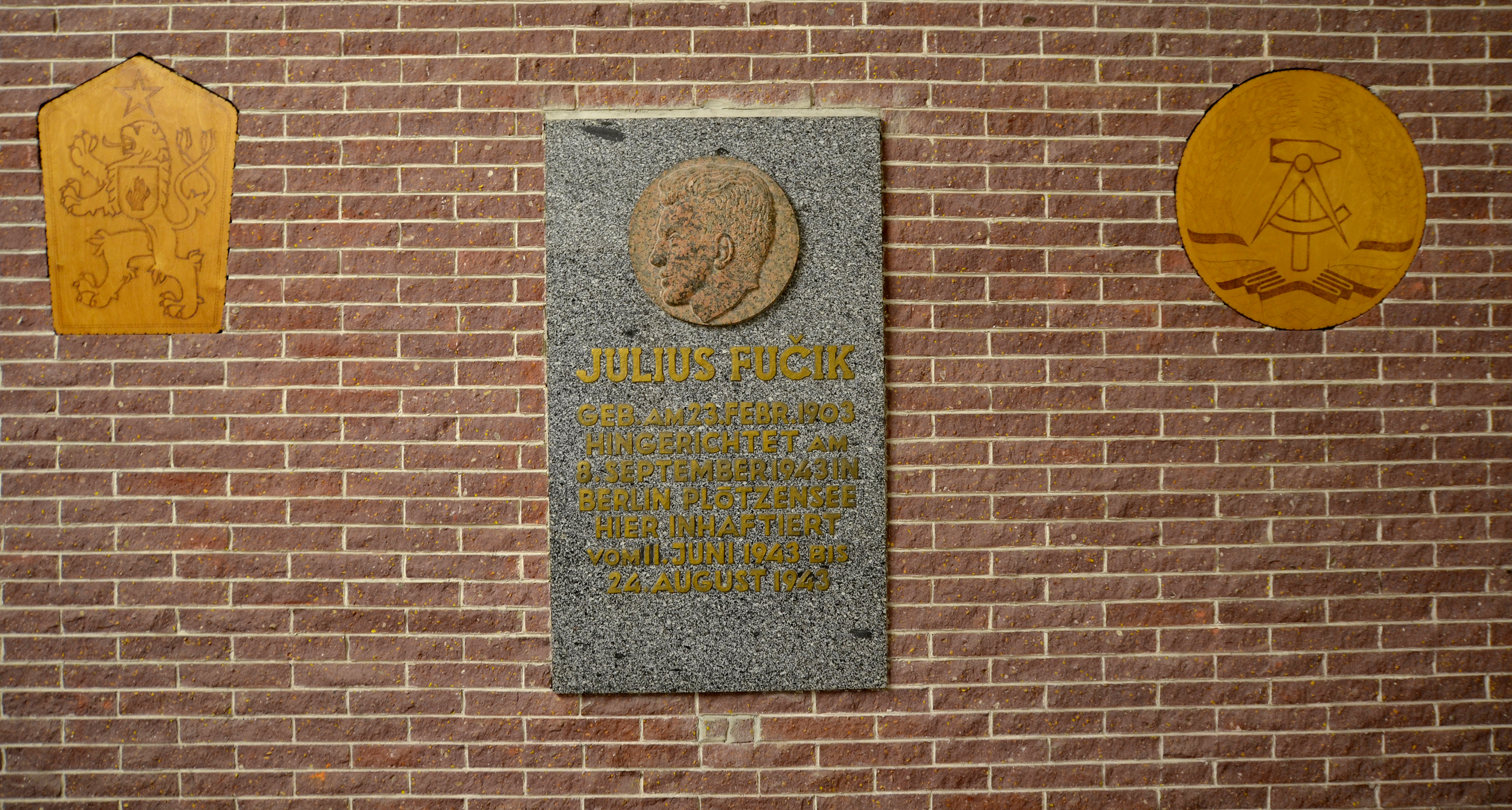
A memorial to Julius Fučík in Bautzen II

The Party found Julius Fučík and his book convenient for use as propaganda and turned them into one of its most visible symbols. The book was required reading in schools and by the age of 10 every pupil growing up in communist Czechoslovakia was familiar with Fučík's work and life. Fučík became a hero whose portrait was displayed at political meetings. Gusta Fučíková was given a high position in the Party hierarchy (the chairmanship of a women's organization), holding it for decades.

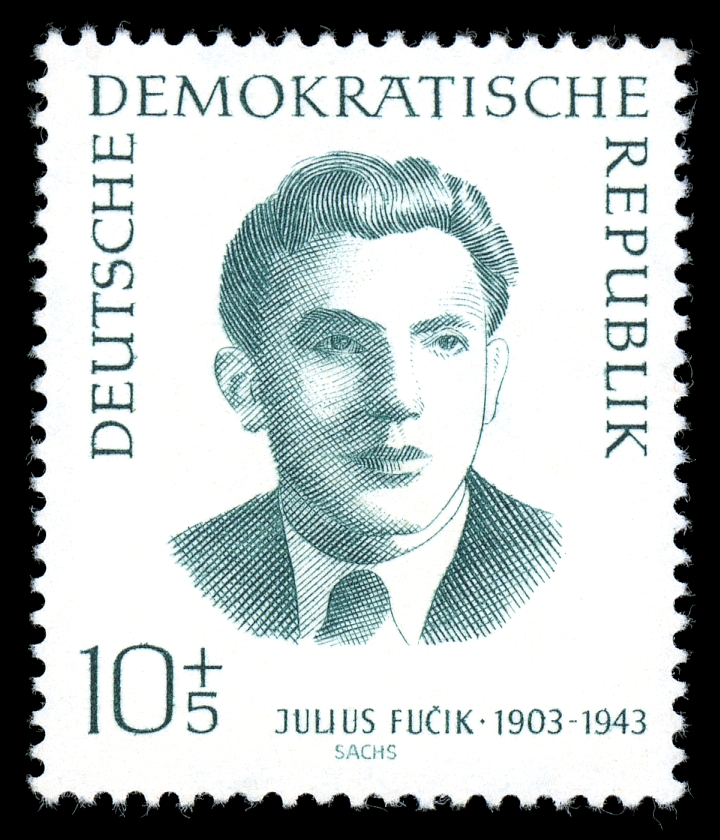
An image of Fučík on a 1966 GDR stamp

Many places were named after Fučík, among them a large entertainment park in Prague (Park kultury a oddechu Julia Fučíka), the city theatre in Jablonec nad Nisou (1945–98), a factory in Brno (Elektrotechnické závody Julia Fučíka), a military unit, and countless streets and squares. In December 2022, the Julius Fučík street in Kyiv, Ukraine was renamed to Karel Čapek street.

== References in popular culture ==
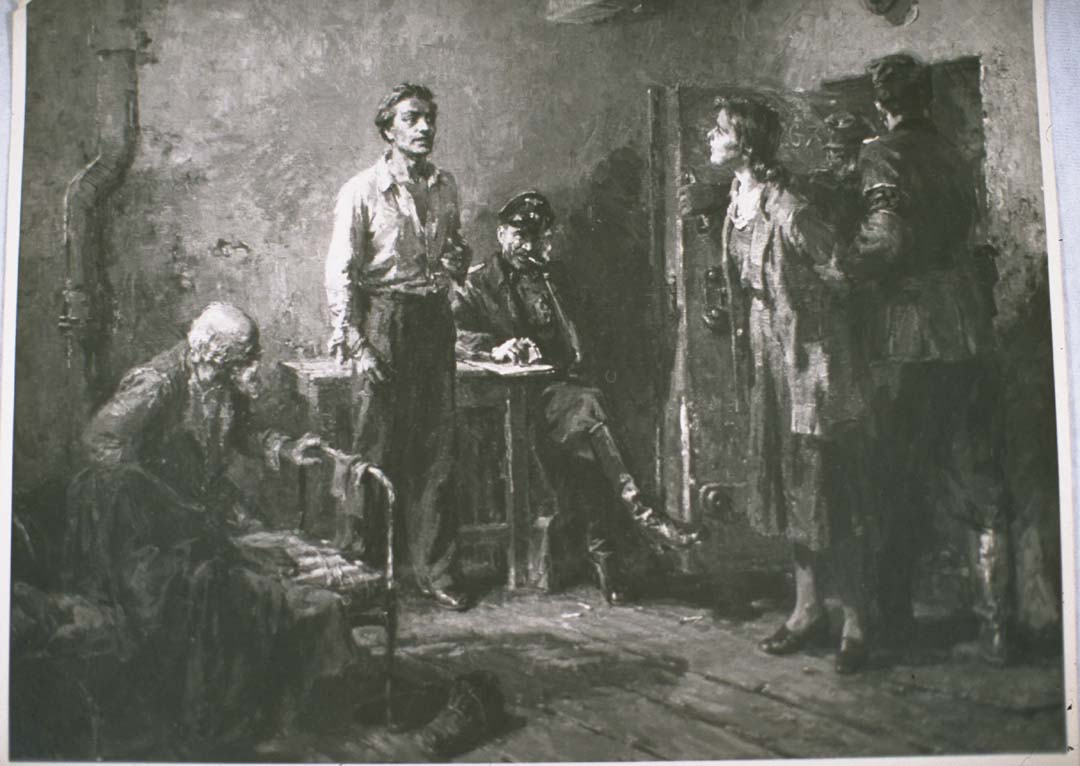
Last Meeting, Julius Fučík triptych by Felix Lembersky, Aleksandr Dashkevich, Nikolay Brandt

In 1955, Milan Kundera published a poetic tale entitled Poslední máj (The Last May) that depicts an encounter between Fučík and his Nazi interrogators. The position and reverence of Fučík during Communist Czechoslovakia is depicted by Kundera in his 1967 novel The Joke. There he describes how the portrait of Fučík hangs in public buildings where public expulsions from the Communist Party took place, and how Fučík's book is recited and used as propaganda by the Communist party.

"I recognized Fučík's Notes from the Gallows...That text, written clandestinely in prison, then published after the war in a million copies, broadcast over the radio, studied in schools as required reading, was the sacred book of the era."

The composer Luigi Nono wrote a musical piece titled Julius Fučík based on Notes from the Gallows.

The Yulius Fuchik (Юлиус Фучик) was a Soviet and later Russian barge carrier. In Tom Clancy's 1986 novel Red Storm Rising, about a hypothetical war between the Warsaw Pact and NATO, this ship was given the role of being used for the Soviet invasion of Iceland.

Disco Elysium, a 2019 role-playing video game, paraphrases Julius's final words in a line delivered by Shivers, a character who embodies the spirit of the game's war ravaged post-communist setting.

"I NEED YOU. YOU CAN KEEP ME ON THIS EARTH. BE VIGILANT. I LOVE YOU."

== Reassessment ==
After the Party lost its power in 1989, the legend of Fučík became a target of scrutiny. It was made public that some parts of the book Notes from the Gallows (around 2%) had been omitted and that the text had been "sanitized" by Gusta Fučíková. There were speculations as to how much information he gave his torturers, and whether he had turned traitor.

In 1995, the complete text of the book was published. The part in which Fučík describes how he succumbed to torture was published for the first time. In it, one learns that Fučík gave false information to his captors, saving countless lives among the Czech resistance to the Nazis. The historian Alena Hájková coedited the critical edition of Fučík's memoir.

== Selected works ==
=== Reports ===
- Reportáže z buržoazní republiky, published in journals, collected in 1948
- V zemi, kde zítra již znamená včera, about the Soviet Union, 1932
- V zemi milované, about the Soviet Union, published posthumously in 1949
- Reportáž psaná na oprátce (Notes from the Gallows), 1947, complete text in 1995, many editions and translations

=== Theatrical critiques and literary essays ===
- Milujeme svoji zem, 1948
- Stati o literatuře, 1951
- Božena Němcová bojující, O Sabinově zradě, Chůva published in Tři studie, 1947.

=== Other ===
- Pokolení před Petrem, an autobiographical novel, unfinished, 1939
