= Libuše Márová =

Czech operatic mezzo-soprano (born 1943)

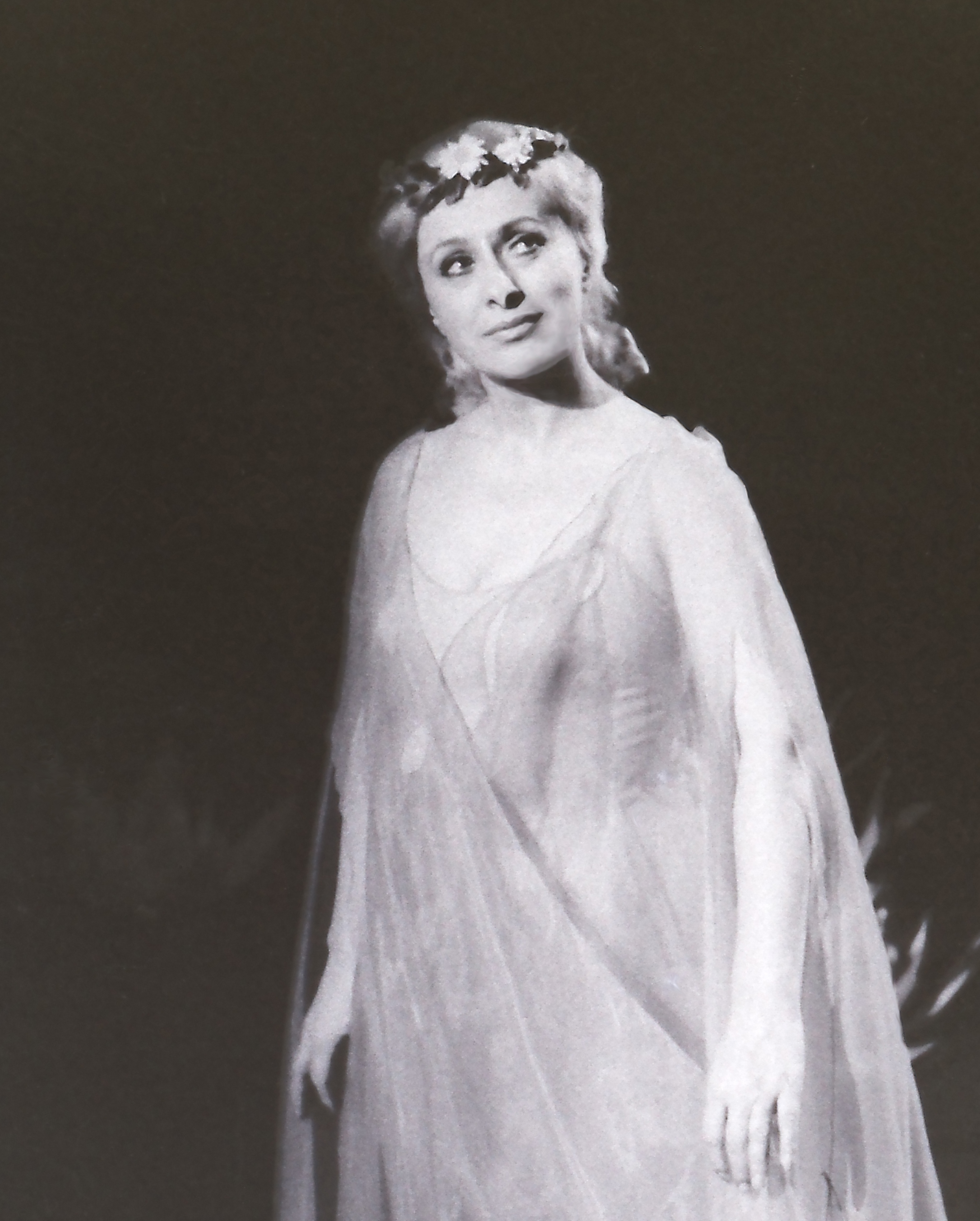

Background information
- Born: 24 December 1943 (age 81); Sušice, Czechoslovakia
- Genres: Opera
- Occupation(s): Singer, teacher
- Instrument: Vocals
- Years active: 1965–present

Libuše Márová (born 24 December 1943) is a Czech operatic mezzo-soprano who has been a principal artist at the National Theatre in Prague since 1969. She has sung on a number of recordings in the Supraphon label and currently teaches on the voice faculty at the Academy of Performing Arts in Prague.

== Biography ==
Born in Sušice, Márová studied at the Academy of Performing Arts in Prague with Přemysl Kočí, Josef Frýdl, Štěpánka Štěpánová, and Michael Zabejda. She made her professional opera debut in 1965 at the Divadlo Josefa Kajetána Tyla in Plzeň as Azucena in Giuseppe Verdi's Il Trovatore.

In 1969 Márová was appointed to the Prague National Theatre where she quickly became one of the theatre's most important artists. On stage she excelled in the dramatic Czech repertoire, portraying such roles as Donna Isabella in The Bride of Messina, Fanny in The Excursions of Mr. Brouček to the Moon and to the 15th Century, Martinka in The Kiss, Varvara in Káťa Kabanová, Vlasta in Šárka, and the title role in Jiří Pauer's Zuzana Vojiřovà. Among the other roles she has portrayed on stage are Cherubino in The Marriage of Figaro, Dorabella in Così fan tutte, Donna Elvira in Don Giovanni, Judith in Bluebeard's Castle, Princess Eboli in Don Carlo, Rosina in The Barber of Seville, and the title role in Carmen.

Márová has also worked actively as a guest artist with opera houses throughout Europe. At the Komische Oper Berlin she has portrayed Ulrica in Un ballo in maschera and Dulcinée in Jules Massenet's Don Quichotte. She has also made appearances at the De Nederlandse Opera, the Grand Théâtre de Bordeaux, La Monnaie, the Norwegian National Opera, and the Edinburgh Festival.

== Literature ==
- Šormová, Eva (2000). Česká divadla: encyklopedie divadelních souborů (in Czech). Divadelní ústav. p. 333. ISBN 978-80-7008-107-5
- Janota, Dalibor; Kučera, Jan P. (1999). Malá encyklopedie české opery (in Czech). Paseka. p. 161. ISBN 978-80-7185-236-0
- Třeštík, Michael (2005). Kdo je kdo: osobnosti české současnosti : 5000 životopisů (in Czech). Agentura Kdo je kdo. p. 404. ISBN 978-80-902586-9-3
