= Notes from the Gallows =

1942 book by Julius Fučík

- The cover of the first edition of the book to contain the full original text, 1995. 'Notes from the Gallows: The First Complete, Critical, Annotated Edition'
- Author: Julius Fučík
- Language: Czech
- Genre: Reportage
- Publication date: 1945
- Publication place: Czechoslovakia

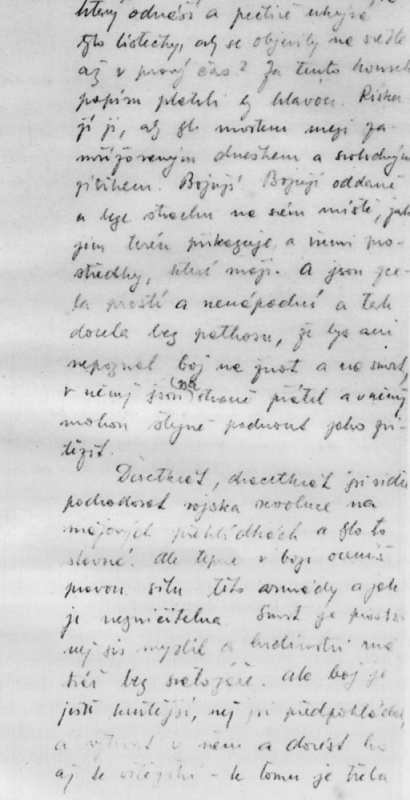
Detail from Fučík's prison manuscript

Notes from the Gallows (also published as Report from the Gallows) is a collection of notes written by the anti-Nazi, communist journalist, Julius Fučík, originally on pieces of cigarette paper, while imprisoned by the Gestapo in the Pankrac district of Prague in 1942. The book's Czech title is Reportáž, psaná na oprátce, literally Report Written on the Noose.

== Content ==
In April 1942, the Czech journalist Julius Fučík was arrested by the German Gestapo for his activities as an anti-Nazi activist of the Communist Party of Czechoslovakia. Notes from the Gallows is his account of his imprisonment in Prague, before he was moved to German prisons and executed by hanging in 1943 in Berlin.

Fluctuating between testimony and self-reflection, the work deals dramatically and emotively with anti-Nazi resistance, interrogations, and the personalities of fellow inmates and prison guards. The author is clear on the devastation caused by Nazism and believes in communism as the only possible future for humanity.

== Compilation and initial publication ==
Fučík wrote on pieces of cigarette paper, which he rolled up and entrusted, piece by piece, to the prison guard Adolf Kolínský, who also collaborated with a police officer, Jaroslav Hora, to smuggle the writing out of prison. A total of 167 rolls were smuggled out in this way, which Kolínský stored in a pickling jar buried in the ground.

After the war, Fučík's wife Gusta met Kolínský and arranged with Ladislav Štoll, the communist literary critic and later Czechoslovak minister of education and culture, to collect and publish the smuggled notes.

In the first edition, Gusta Fučíková left out certain passages from the manuscript, where Fučík had described the 'high game' he played with the Gestapo and outlined his interrogations. Many critics argued that these redacted passages revealed that Fučík had collaborated with the Gestapo and betrayed the resistance effort. A fully critically edition of the Notes published in 1995, dispelled the rumours that its author had betrayed the cause: his behaviour was not conspiratorial in nature.

The authorship, originality, and completeness of the manuscript have at times been called into question. In 1990, it was examined by the Institute of Criminalistics in Prague, which confirmed Julius Fučík as the true author. The institute further found that none of the 167 manuscript leaves had been physically or chemically altered, other than by the author.

The manuscript is in the care of the Workers' Movement Museum of the Czech Republic, and since 2014 has been on loan to the National Museum.

== Criticism ==
Professor of Slavic studies at the University of Pennsylvania Petr Steiner describes the text not as reportage, but as a romance. He charged Fučík with sentimentality, consciously avoiding the world as it is, in order to make a case for how it should, be while casting himself as a saviour figure.

== Editions and translations ==
In 2008, Otto Press in Prague published a facsimile copy of the manuscript with a foreword by the Czech writer Zdeněk Mahler.

The database of the National Library of the Czech Republic lists a total of 35 Czech editions between 1945 and 1994.

Notes from the Gallows is believed to be the most translated work of Czech literature, having been published in around 90 languages.

English editions have also been titled Report from the Gallows, a slightly closer translation of the original Czech title, Reportaž, psaná na opratce.

== Legacy ==
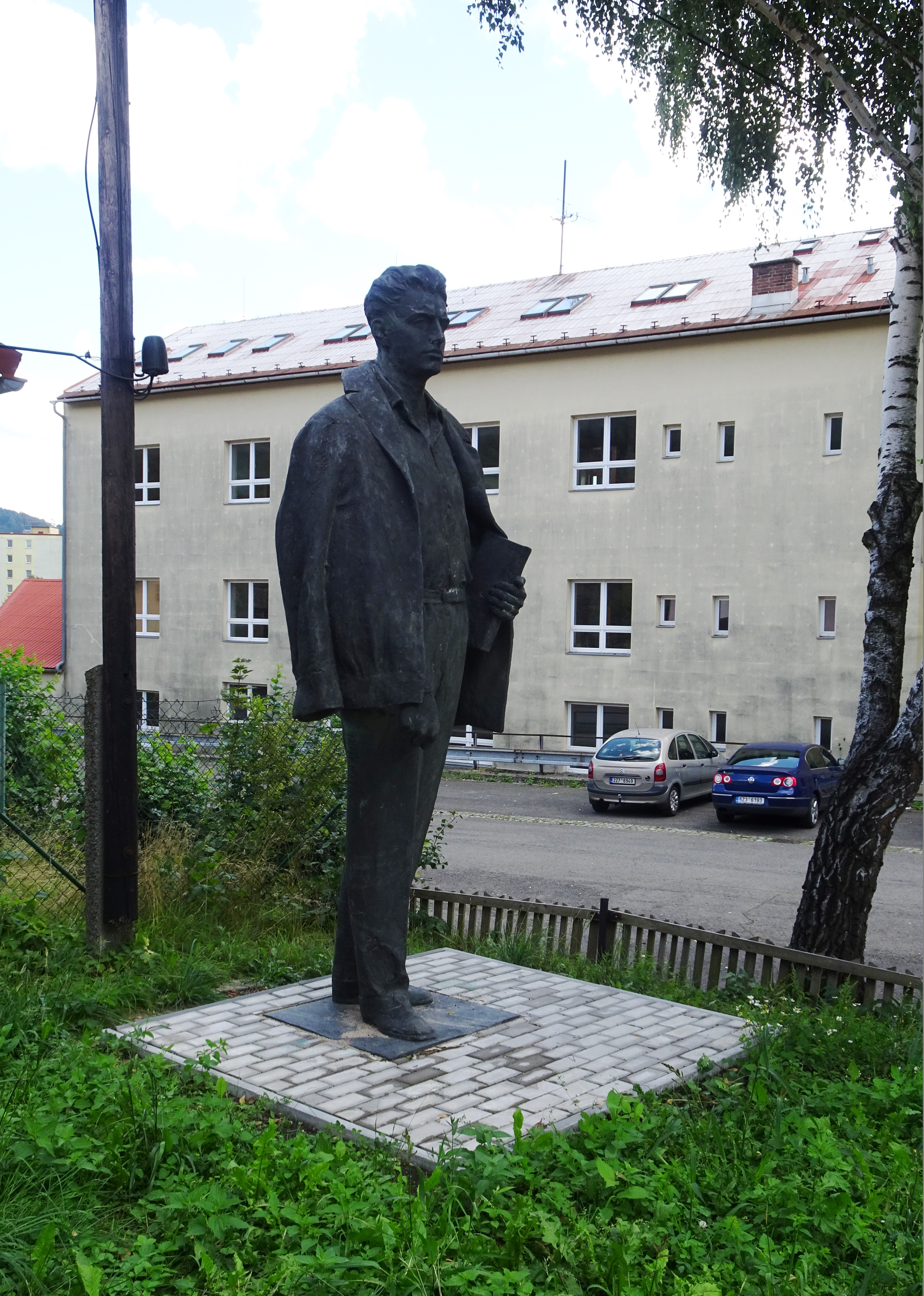
A monument to Julius Fučík in Vsetín, Czech Republic, one of several in the country

When Czechoslovakia came under Soviet control after the war, Fučík's account of his imprisonment and torture led the country's new government to lionise him as a war hero and martyr for its ideological agenda. Monuments were made to him and streets were named after him. Until the Velvet Revolution of 1989, Notes from the Gallows was widely taught in Czechoslovak schools.

The book was widely read and shared by revolutionary activists around the world. It continues to inform Palestinian dissidents' strategies for resisting interrogation under torture, for example.

== Adolf Kolínský ==
The prison guard who conspired with Fučík, Adolf Kolínský, was transferred to other internment camps after Pankrác, including the Small Fortress at Terezín, and in his role as warder continued to support political prisoners to resist Nazi occupation.

Without his actions, Notes from the Gallows would never have been published, but Kolínský met with public disfavour after the Communists took power in Czechoslovakia. In January 1954, he asked the then minister of culture Václav Kopecký to stop using his name in public in relation to Fučík because "the frequent use of my name in connection with J. Fučík's work is provoking distrust in my actions among the people, since the people are now such that they think recognition and gratitude cannot be realised in words at all, but only through actions in turn. My family and I are suffering from this mistrust, which certainly is not in the interests of the cause itself."
