= Gabriel Feltz =

German conductor (1971–2025)

Gabriel Feltz (17 June 1971 – 29 August 2025) was a German conductor.

== Life and work ==
Feltz was born in East Berlin on 17 June 1971, and studied at the Hochschule für Musik Hanns Eisler Berlin, completing his studies in conducting and piano in 1994. He was First assistant to Gerd Albrecht at the Hamburg State Opera, then his first engagements took him to the Städtische Bühnen Lübeck (1995–1997) and the Theater Bremen (1997–2000). From 1996 to 1997 he also conducted the Harvestehuder Sinfonieorchester Hamburg at the same time. From 2000 to 2005 he held the office of GMD of the Theater & Philharmonie Thüringen in Gera/Altenburg. Feltz has conducted the Deutsches Symphonie-Orchester Berlin, the Symphonieorchester des Bayerischen Rundfunks (Munich) as part of the ARD International Music Competition 2003, the Bavarian State Orchestra, the Gürzenich Orchestra Cologne, the Rundfunk-Sinfonieorchester Berlin and the Rundfunkorchester Köln, the Frankfurt Opera and Museum Orchestra, the Staatskapelle Weimar, the Essen Philharmonic, the Konzerthausorchester Berlin, the Beethoven Orchestra Bonn, the Bremen Philharmonic, the Mecklenburgische Staatskapelle Schwerin, the Dresden Philharmonic, the RIAS Youth Orchestra Berlin, the Bamberg Symphony Orchestra in productions for the Bavarian Radio Munich as well as the orchestra of the Flemish Opera Antwerp.

In 2000/01 Feltz conducted a new production of Luigi Nono's Intolleranza 1960 directed by Johann Kresnik at the Theater Bremen. In March 1999 he made his debut at the Bavarian State Opera in Munich with a ballet performance and has been a regular guest there since then, again in July 2006. In October 2004, Feltz made his debut with the Staatskapelle Dresden at the Semperoper, and in January/February 2005 he returned to the podium of the Bamberg Symphony Orchestra for a production by the Bavarian Radio in Munich. He also conducted the Halle Philharmonic State Orchestra on a tour of Switzerland with concerts at Geneva's Victoria Hall and the Tonhalle Zurich.

In the 2005/06 season, he accepted invitations from the National Youth Orchestra to tour Germany as well as to concerts with the Jena Philharmonic and the Mannheim National Theatre Orchestra. In 2006/07 Feltz gave concerts with the Vienna Radio Symphony Orchestra, amongst others.

From 2004 to 2013, Feltz was chief conductor of the Stuttgart Philharmonic. From 2017 to 2025, he was chef conductor of the Belgrade Philharmonic Orchestra. In the 2024/25 season, he was general music director at Theater Kiel.

Feltz died at Essen University Hospital on 29 August 2025, at the age of 54.
