= Ostředek =

- Municipality
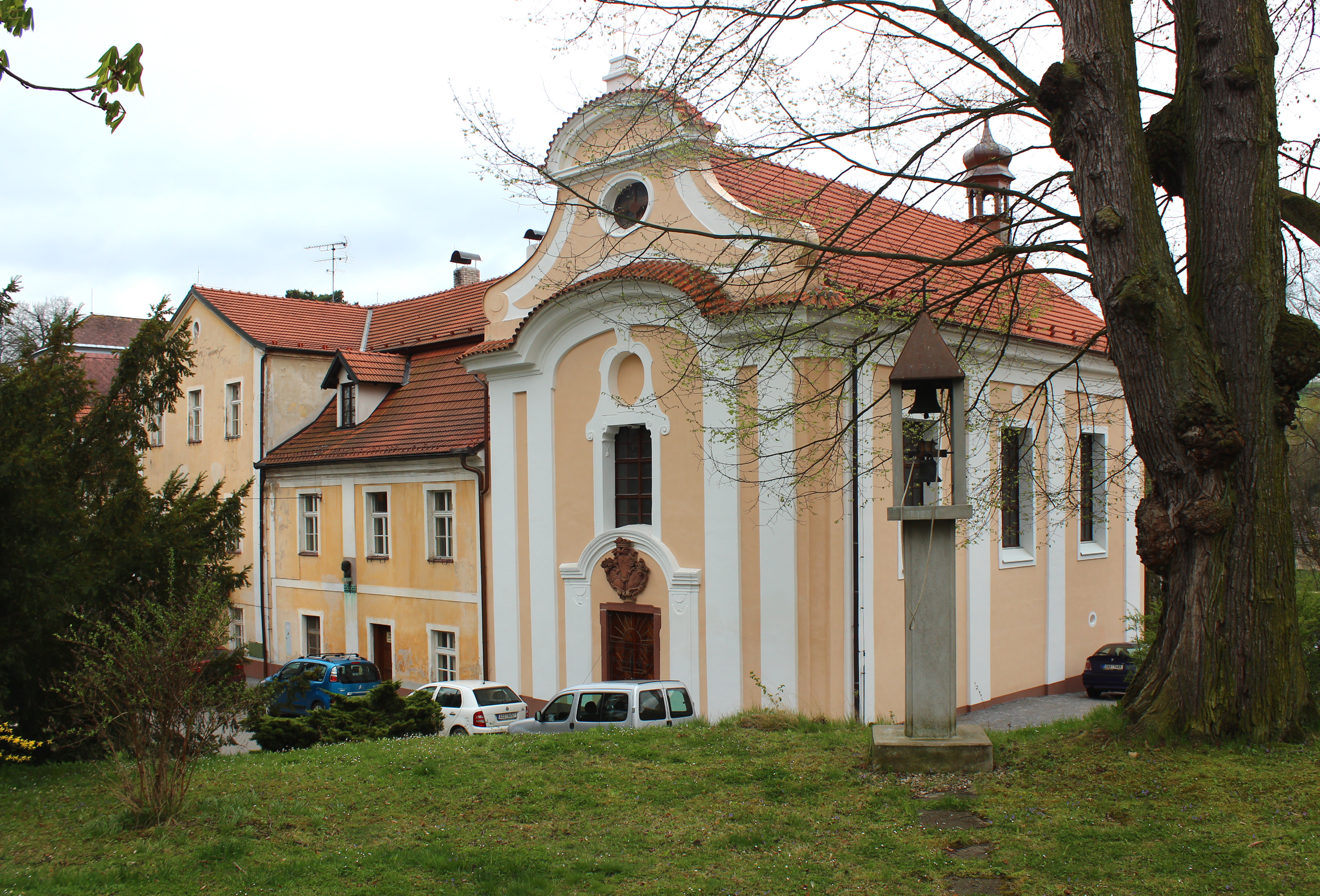
- Ostředek Castle

- Flag Coat of arms

- Location in the Czech Republic
- Coordinates: 49°50′5″N 14°49′56″E
- Country: Czech Republic
- Region: Central Bohemian
- District: Benešov
- First mentioned: 1356

Area
  - Total: 12.97 km^{2} (5.01 sq mi)
- Elevation: 442 m (1,450 ft)

Population (2026-01-01)
  - Total: 497
  - Density: 38.3/km^{2} (99.2/sq mi)
- Time zone: UTC+1 (CET)
  - Summer (DST): UTC+2 (CEST)
- Postal code: 257 24
- Website: www.chopos.cz/ostredek-titulni-strana.html

Ostředek is a municipality and village in Benešov District in the Central Bohemian Region of the Czech Republic. It has about 500 inhabitants.

== Administrative division ==
Ostředek consists of five municipal parts (in brackets population according to the 2021 census):

- Ostředek (348)
- Bělčice (17)
- Mžižovice (27)
- Třemošnice (73)
- Vráž (1)

== Etymology ==
The word ostředek used to refer to an elevated central place in a flowerbed. The village got its name figuratively based on how it looked in the landscape.

== Geography ==
Ostředek is located about 11 kilometres (7 mi) northeast of Benešov and 31 km (19 mi) southeast of Prague. It lies in the Benešov Uplands. The highest point is at 520 m (1,706 ft) above sea level. The stream Ostředecký potok originates here, flows across the municipality and supplies there a system of fishponds.

== History ==
The first written mention of Ostředek is from 1356.

== Demographics ==
Historical population

Year	Pop.	±%
1869	1,098	—
1880	992	−9.7%
1890	971	−2.1%
1900	853	−12.2%
1910	824	−3.4%

Year	Pop.	±%
1921	764	−7.3%
1930	667	−12.7%
1950	506	−24.1%
1961	505	−0.2%
1970	437	−13.5%

Year	Pop.	±%
1980	400	−8.5%
1991	361	−9.8%
2001	306	−15.2%
2011	437	+42.8%
2021	466	+6.6%

Source: Censuses

== Transport ==
The D1 motorway from Prague to Brno runs through the municipality.

== Sights ==
The main landmark of Ostředek is the Ostředek Castle. It is a Baroque building with Neoclassical modifications. The castle complex includes the valuable Chapel of Saint John of Nepomuk, which was added to the castle in 1739.

== Notable people ==
- Svatopluk Čech (1846–1908), writer
- Gusta Fučíková (1903–1987), publisher and Communist politician
