= Gusta Fučíková =

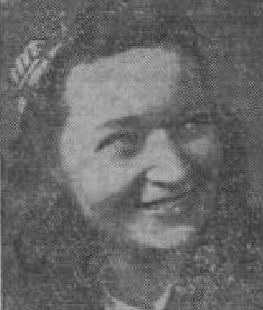
- Fučíková in 1948
- Born: Augusta Kodeřičová; August 28, 1903; Ostředek
- Died: March 25, 1987 (aged 83)
- Occupations: politician, women's rights activist, publicist and editor

Gusta Fučíková (born Augusta Kodeřičová; 28 August 1903, Ostředek – 25 March 1987) was a Czech politician, women's rights activist, publicist and editor. A member of the Czechoslovak Communist Party, she served as a deputy of the "Chamber of the People of the Federal Assembly (one of the two chambers of the Czechoslovak Federal Assembly) during the period of normalization. She was an activist of women's and left-wing peace movements and the wife of the Communist journalist and resistance fighter Julius Fučík, who was executed by Nazi Germany during the World War II.

== Early life ==
Gusta Kodeřičová was born on 28 August 1903 in Ostředek into a working-class family. Her mother died when she was still a child. After graduating from a business academy in Prague in 1921, she briefly studied at the Higher School of Commerce but did not complete her degree.

She met Julius Fučík in 1923 and joined the Communist Party of Czechoslovakia the following year. During the interwar period, she worked at the Ministry of Education, the International Trade Union Federation, the Soviet trade mission, and later as a translator for the communist newspaper Rudé právo.

== Personal life ==
In the 1920s, she married journalist Vladimír Borin-Ležák. According to later biographical accounts, the marriage was primarily intended to secure a state marriage grant, which was reportedly used to finance a communist political meeting. The marriage ended in divorce in 1933.

On 30 July 1938, she married Julius Fučík in Prague. Their wedding witnesses included communist leaders Jan Šverma and Bedřich Reicin.

== Second World War ==
During the German occupation of Czechoslovakia, Fučíková participated in the anti-Nazi resistance. She was arrested in April 1942 and remained imprisoned until the end of the war. She was held in several prisons and concentration camps, including Ravensbrück and Theresienstadt.

== Post-war career ==
After the war, Fučíková worked as an editor at the publishing house Svoboda, where she remained until 1967. She edited a twelve-volume collection of Julius Fučík's writings and published several books and articles about the resistance and the Second World War, including Memories of Julius Fučík (1961) and Life with Julius Fučík (1971).

She became a prominent figure in official women's and peace organizations, serving in leading positions within the Czechoslovak Women's Committee, the Czechoslovak Women's Council, the International Democratic Federation of Women, and the World Peace Council. In 1963, she received the Gold Medal of the World Peace Council.

Following the suppression of the Prague Spring, Fučíková remained a loyal supporter of the communist regime. She signed the pro-communist declaration supporting the February 1948 communist takeover and later endorsed the Anti-Charter initiative in 1977, which publicly opposed the human rights movement Charter 77.

She also held senior positions within the Communist Party, serving on the Central Committee of the Communist Party of Czechoslovakia from 1971. Between 1971 and 1981, she represented Prague in the People's Chamber of the Federal Assembly.

== Honours ==
Fučíková received several of communist Czechoslovakia's highest state decorations, including:

- Order of Labour (1963)
- Order of the Republic (1970, 1973)
- Order of the Victorious February (1973)
- Order of Klement Gottwald (1983)

== Death ==
Gusta Fučíková died on 25 March 1987 at the age of 83. She is buried at the Olšany Cemetery in Prague, in a communal grave shared with several prominent communist figures, including Klement Gottwald and Marta Gottwaldová.
