= Svatopluk Čech =

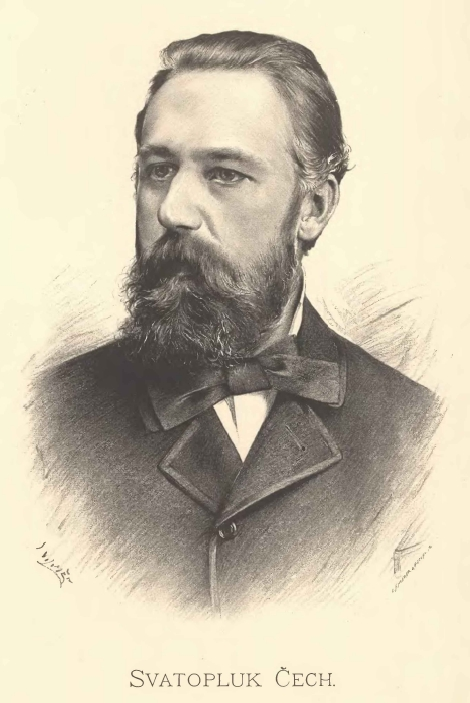
Portrait of Čech by Jan Vilímek

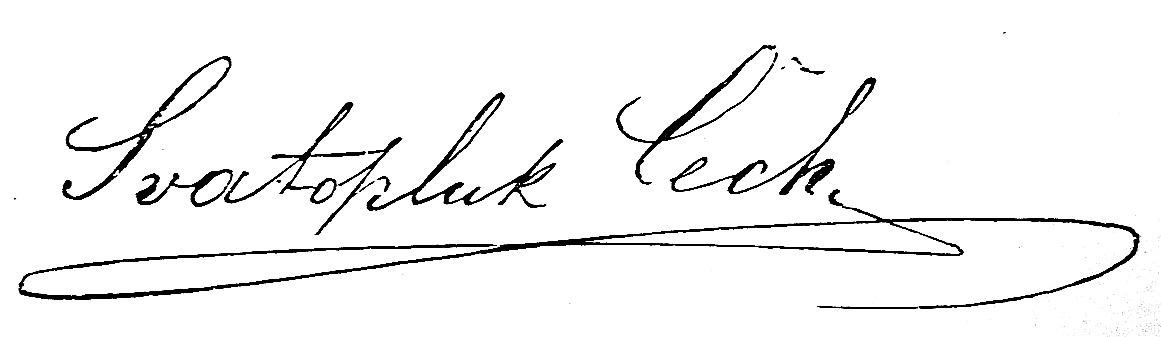
Signature

Svatopluk Čech (21 February 1846 – 23 February 1908) was a Czech writer, journalist and poet.

== Biography ==
Čech was born in Ostředek. He studied at gymnasium in Prague, then studied law, and later worked in the journals Květy, Lumír and Světozor.

His first poem, Husita na Baltu, was published in the almanac Ruch in 1868. Similarly to his work Adamité, it is inspired by history (Hussite Wars). His poem Evropa (1878) takes its cue from revolutionary movements of the time, his poem Slávie (1882) propagates ideals of Slavic unity, the poem Václav z Michalovic (1880) depicts religious oppression by the Jesuits, his poem Lešetínský kovář (1883 confiscated, 1899) social problems of industrialization. The books of lyrical poetry Jitřní písně (1887) and Nové písně (1888) reflect the national rebirth of the Czech people, and his poetry cycle Písně otroka reflects social problems.

His best known work today is a series of satirical novels, Výlety pana Broučka (1888, 1889), two of which were used as the basis for Janáček's opera The Excursions of Mr. Brouček to the Moon and to the 15th Century (Výlet pana Broučka do Měsíce/Výlet pana Broučka do XV. století). Čech himself appears as an apparition in Act Three of the opera.

A bridge in Prague bears the name Svatopluk Čech Bridge (Most Svatopluka Čecha) in his honor. Also multiple streets in various Czech cities are named after him.

Svatopluk Čech died in Prague on 23 February 1908 at the age of 62. He was buried at the Vyšehrad Cemetery in Prague.
