= Byšičky =

- Village
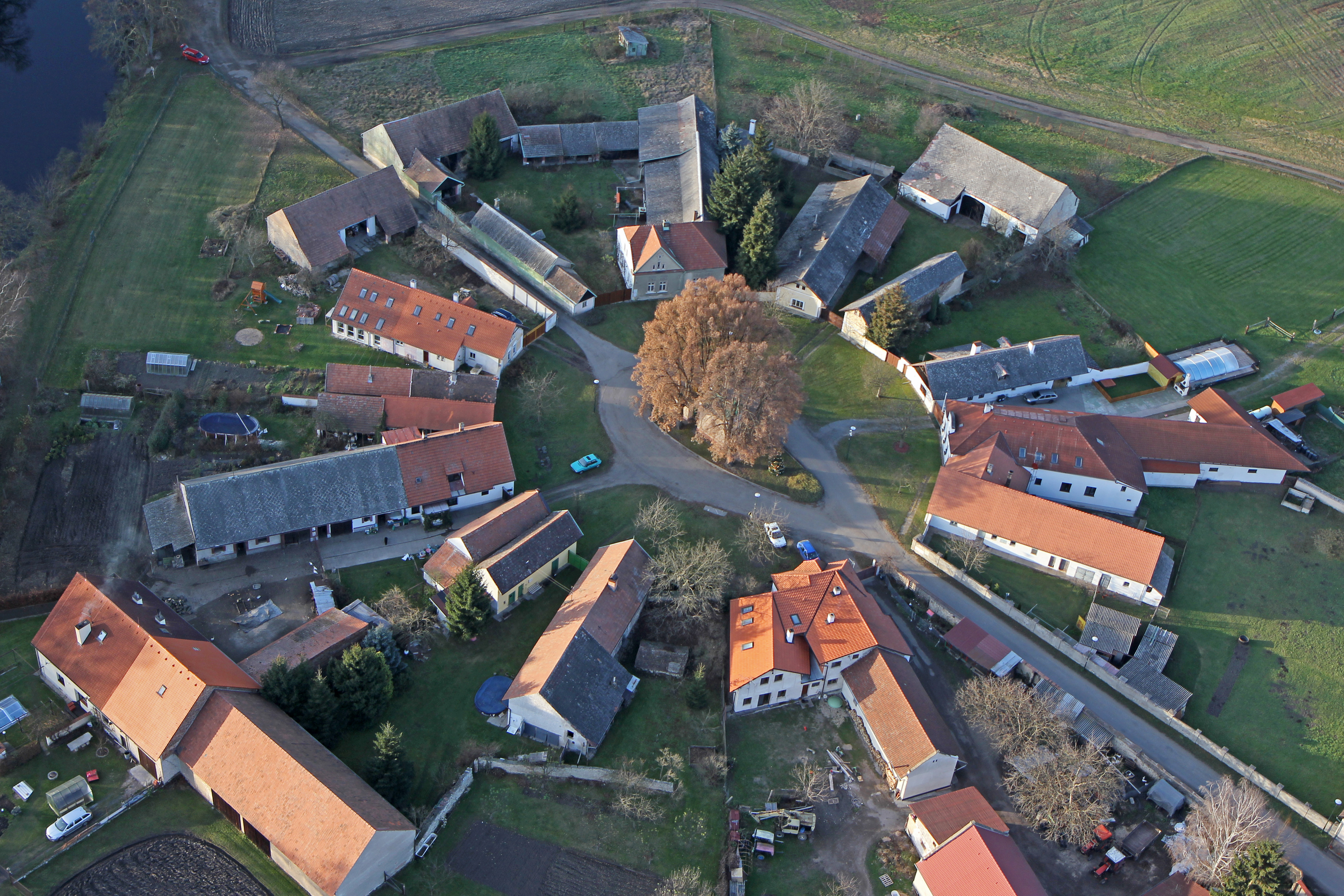
- Centre of Byšičky

- Location in the Czech Republic
- Coordinates: 50°10′50″N 14°47′40″E
- Country: Czech Republic
- Region: Central Bohemian
- District: Nymburk
- Municipality: Lysá nad Labem
- First mentioned: 1546

Area
  - Total: 3.96 km^{2} (1.53 sq mi)
- Elevation: 175 m (574 ft)

Population (2021)
  - Total: 125
  - Density: 31.6/km^{2} (81.8/sq mi)
- Time zone: UTC+1 (CET)
  - Summer (DST): UTC+2 (CEST)
- Postal code: 289 22

Byšičky is a village and municipal part of Lysá nad Labem in Nymburk District in the Central Bohemian Region of the Czech Republic. It has about 100 inhabitants. It has a round village green, with a tiny chapel surrounded by four large linden trees in the centre.

== Demographics ==
Historical population
Year	Pop.	±%
1869	197	—
1880	195	−1.0%
1890	205	+5.1%
1900	198	−3.4%
1910	174	−12.1%
1921	197	+13.2%
1930	161	−18.3%
1950	146	−9.3%
1961	135	−7.5%
1970	113	−16.3%
1980	85	−24.8%
1991	57	−32.9%
2001	55	−3.5%
2011	110	+100.0%
2021	125	+13.6%
Source: Censuses
