= Přemysl Kočí =

Czech operatic baritone, actor, music educator, stage director and theatre manager

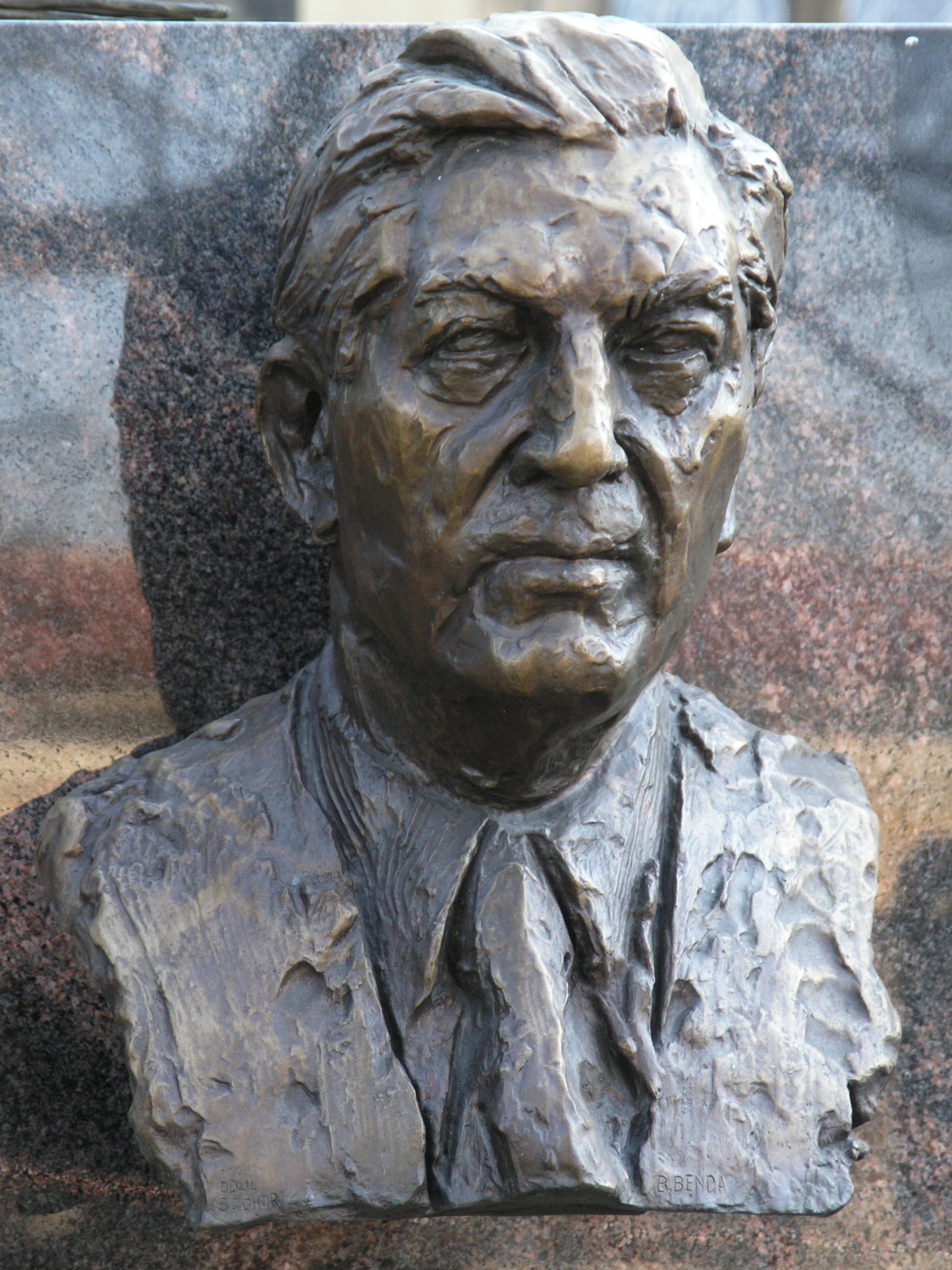
Bust of Přemysl Kočí at the Vyšehrad cemetery

Přemysl Kočí (1 June 1917 – 15 January 2003) was a Czech operatic baritone, actor, music educator, stage director, theatre manager and official of the Communist Party of Czechoslovakia.

== Biography ==
Born in Rychvald, Kočí attended high school in Bohumín. After graduating, he initially wanted to become a teacher and pursued studies at the teacher training college in Ostrava. He became interested in music and in 1937 began studying voice privately, first with J. Soupal and then Rudolf Vašek. In 1939 he made his professional opera debut as Escamillo in Georges Bizet's Carmen at the Antonín Dvořák Theatre in Ostrava.

In 1940 Kočí joined the roster of principal singers at the National Theatre in Prague. He sang there in major roles for over the next two years, collaborating often with conductor Vaclav Talich. He returned to the opera house in Ostrava in 1943 where he remained committed through 1949.

At the behest of the then Minister of Culture Czechoslovakia Zdeněk Nejedlý he returned to the National Theater in 1949, where he now had a long and successful career. Among the many roles he created at the theatre included, Don Manuel in Zdeněk Fibich's The Bride of Messina, Jan Tausendmark in Bedřich Smetana's The Brandenburgers in Bohemia, Marbuel in Antonín Dvořák's The Devil and Kate, Mojmír in Eugen Suchoň's Svätopluk, Scarpia in Giacomo Puccini's Tosca, and the title heroes in Pyotr Ilyich Tchaikovsky's Eugene Onegin and Modest Mussorgsky's Boris Godunov. He recorded a number of these roles on complete opera recordings made on the Supraphon label. Since 1966 he also worked as a stage director at the theatre. He retired from the opera stage in the late 1970s but continued to direct operas through 1983.

During the 1950s and 1960s, Kočí was also active as a guest artist in opera houses in Germany, Poland, Yugoslavia, Romania, Russia and Albania. He had a considerable amount of success at the Berlin State Opera. At the Holland Festival he sang the role of Kuligin in Leoš Janáček's Káťa Kabanová in 1959. In 1964 he appeared at the Edinburgh Festival in the United Kingdom premiere of Janáček's From the House of the Dead.

In 1963 Kočí joined the faculty of the Academy of Performing Arts in Prague. After the Soviet invasion of Czechoslovakia in August 1968, he became the Deputy Central Director of Czechoslovak Television for s short while. He appeared as an actor in a number of Czech television programs and also appeared in Czech films and television productions of operas. He dedicated much of his latter life to teaching singing in Prague, both at the Academy of Performing Arts in Prague and privately. Among his notable pupils was Libuše Márová. He died in Prague in 2003.
