= Jaroslav Kyzlink =

Czech conductor

Jaroslav Kyzlink (born 21 January 1973) is a Czech conductor, who was appointed the music director of the National Theatre in Prague, in August 2012.

Born in Brno, Czech Republic, he graduated from the Janacek Academy of Music and Performing Arts in chorus and orchestra conducting (1995, 1997).

Since 1992 he has worked for the Janacek Opera (National Theatre) in Brno, as a chorus master, conductor, principal conductor and artistic director (2001–2003, touring Japan twice). Since 1999 he has been a regular guest conductor at the State Opera in Prague and since 2002 also at Prague National Theatre Opera. From 2004 to 2006 he was the music director of the Slovak National Theatre (Bratislava), and now he works there as a permanent guest conductor.

He has conducted more than 30 operas, including Handel's Alcina and Britten's Peter Grimes. He specializes in Janacek's works and has conducted most of them.

In December 2008 he contributed to a joint production of Gluck's Orfeo and Eurydice for Slovak National Theatre and Teatr Vielki Warsawa by musical preparation.

In 2009 he prepared and conducted Tchajkovskij's Eugen Onegin in the National Theatre, Brno and the new production of Dvořák's Rusalka in the Greek National Opera in Athens. In August 2010 he worked on the first Danish performance of Erich Wolfgang Korngold's opera Die tote Stadt at the Danish National Theatre.

Recently he has prepared and conducted, among others, the new production of Rusalka at the Theatre Bonn (Germany) and at the New National Theatre in Tokyo. Currently, he is working on new productions of Verdi's Vespri Siciliani for National Theatre in Brno and Don Carlo for National Theatre in Prague (2013) and returning to NNT Tokyo with a new production of Korngold's Die tote Stadt (2014).
