= Chotiměř =

- Municipality
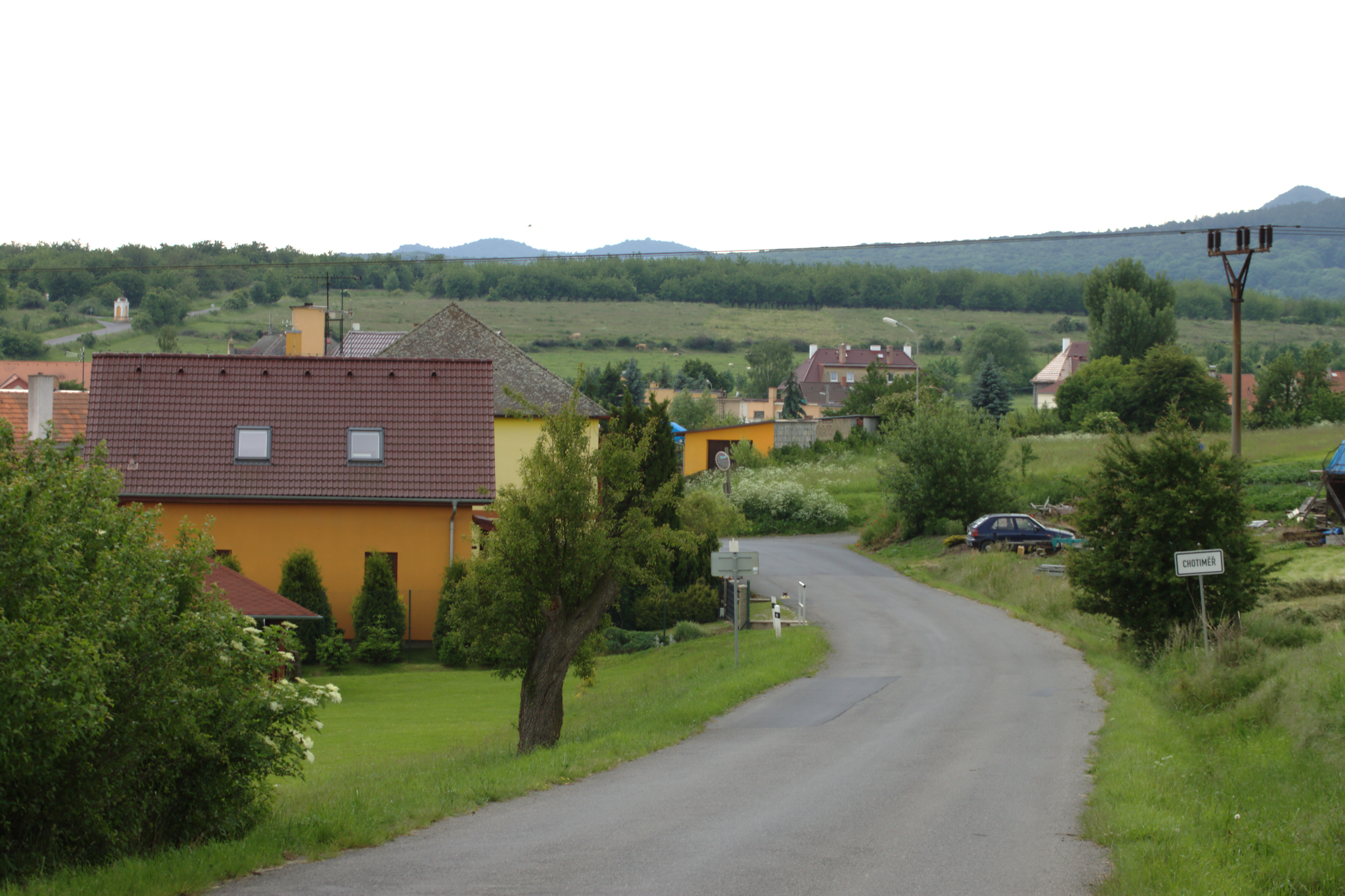
- View from the east

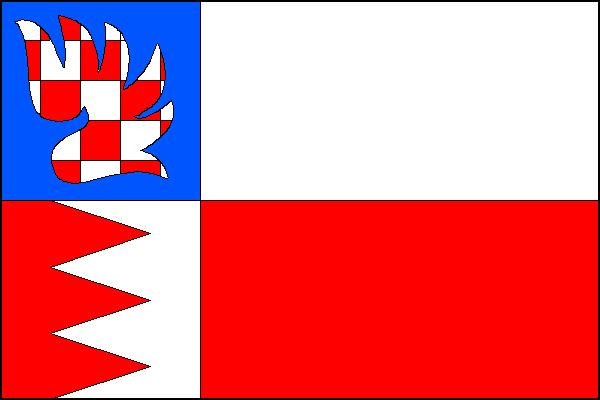
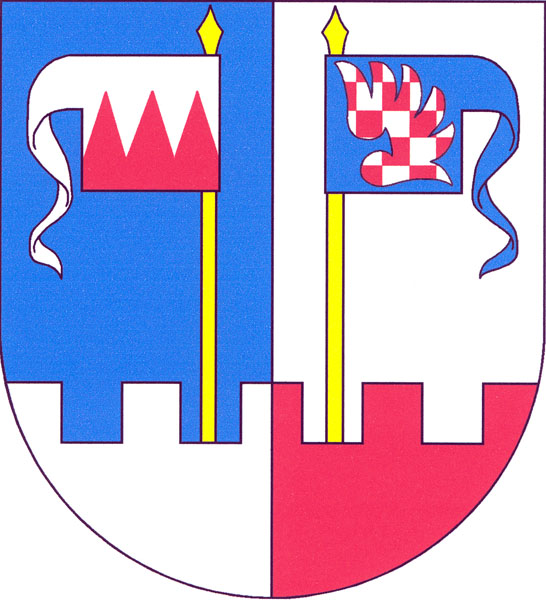
- Flag Coat of arms

- Location in the Czech Republic
- Coordinates: 50°32′54″N 14°0′4″E
- Country: Czech Republic
- Region: Ústí nad Labem
- District: Litoměřice
- First mentioned: 1280

Area
  - Total: 3.42 km^{2} (1.32 sq mi)
- Elevation: 228 m (748 ft)

Population (2026-01-01)
  - Total: 282
  - Density: 82.5/km^{2} (214/sq mi)
- Time zone: UTC+1 (CET)
  - Summer (DST): UTC+2 (CEST)
- Postal code: 410 02
- Website: www.chotimer.cz

Chotiměř is a municipality and village in Litoměřice District in the Ústí nad Labem Region of the Czech Republic. It has about 300 inhabitants.

Chotiměř lies approximately 9 kilometres (6 mi) west of Litoměřice, 13 km (8 mi) south of Ústí nad Labem, and 60 km (37 mi) north-west of Prague.

== Demographics ==
Historical population
Year	Pop.	±%
1869	280	—
1880	323	+15.4%
1890	313	−3.1%
1900	319	+1.9%
1910	367	+15.0%
1921	402	+9.5%
1930	426	+6.0%
1950	249	−41.5%
1961	278	+11.6%
1970	267	−4.0%
1980	287	+7.5%
1991	247	−13.9%
2001	235	−4.9%
2011	302	+28.5%
2021	289	−4.3%
Source: Censuses
