= Stabat Mater (Dvořák) =

Cantata by Antonín Dvořák

- by Antonín Dvořák
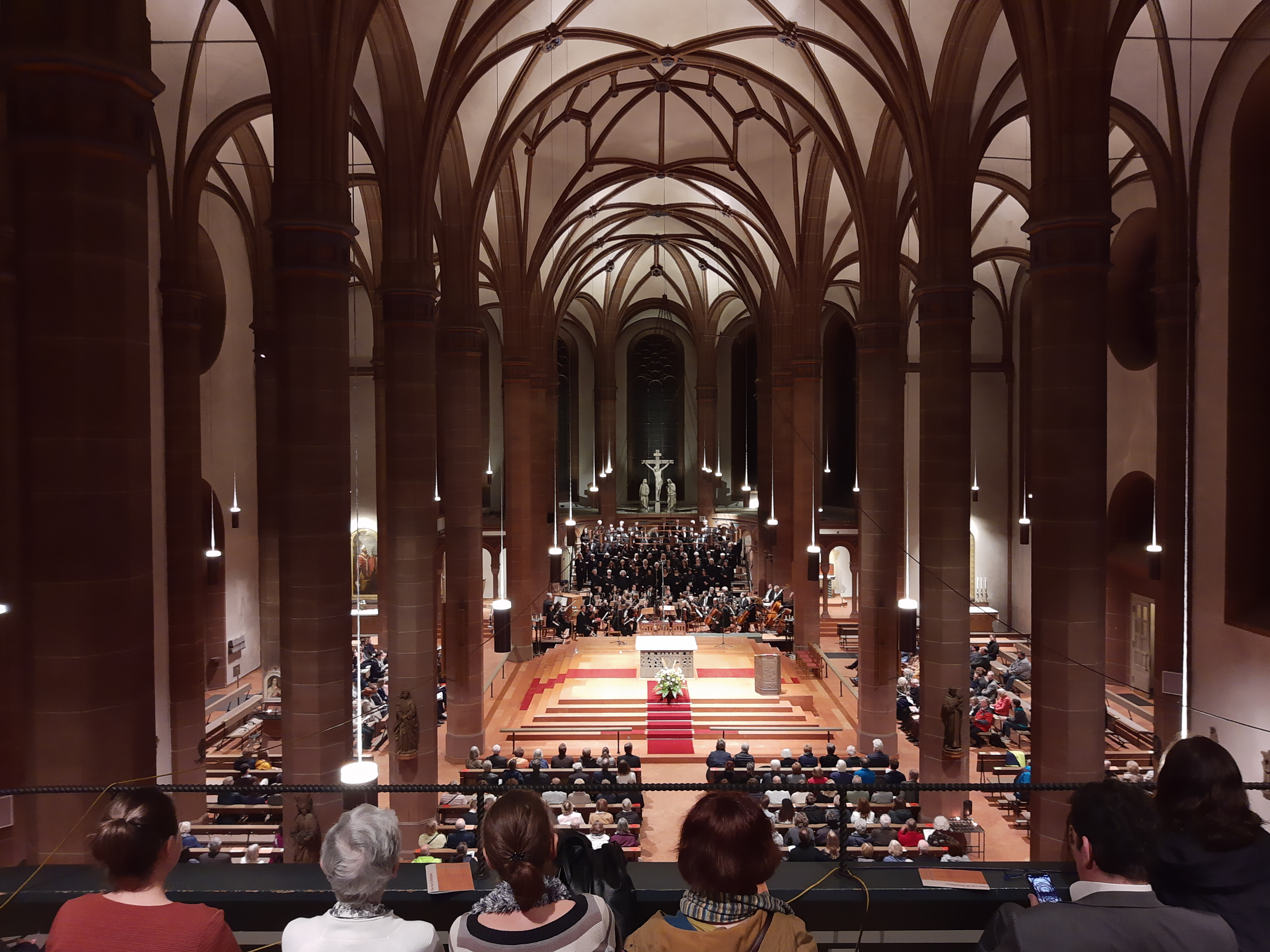
- Stabat Mater at St. Bonifatius, Wiesbaden, 2019
- Catalogue: B. 71
- Opus: 58
- Text: Stabat Mater
- Language: Latin
- Composed: 1876–1877
- Performed: 23 December 1880: Prague
- Movements: Ten
- Vocal: SATB choir and soloists
- Instrumental: Orchestra; organ

Antonín Dvořák's Stabat Mater, Op. 58 (B. 71), is an extended setting for vocal soloists, choir and orchestra of the 20 stanzas of the Stabat Mater sequence. Dvořák sketched the composition in 1876 and completed it in 1877. It has been characterized as a sacred cantata and as an oratorio, and consists of ten movements of which only the first and the last are thematically connected. Its total performance time is around 85 minutes.

The work was first performed in Prague on 23 December 1880. N. Simrock published Dvořák's Op. 58 in 1881. In 1882, Leoš Janáček conducted a performance of the work in Brno. The work was performed in London in 1883, and again, in the Royal Albert Hall, in 1884, and thus played a crucial role in Dvořák's international breakthrough as a composer. In the 21st century the Stabat Mater continues to be Dvořák's best known, and most often performed, sacred work.

== History ==
That Dvořák started to compose his Stabat Mater in February 1876 as a reaction to the death of his two-day-old daughter Josefa in August 1875 has often been told, but has been doubted in 21st-century scholarship. The sketch was written between 19 February and 7 May 1876, and was dedicated to František Hušpauer "as a souvenir to the friend of his young days." On 30 July Dvořák sent his manuscript to Vienna, accompanying an application for a scholarship by the Ministry of Culture and Education. He returned to the final stylisation of the composition in 1877, when his two surviving children died within a short time of each other. The definitive version of the score was written from October to 13 November 1877 in Prague.

== Music ==
=== Structure and scoring ===
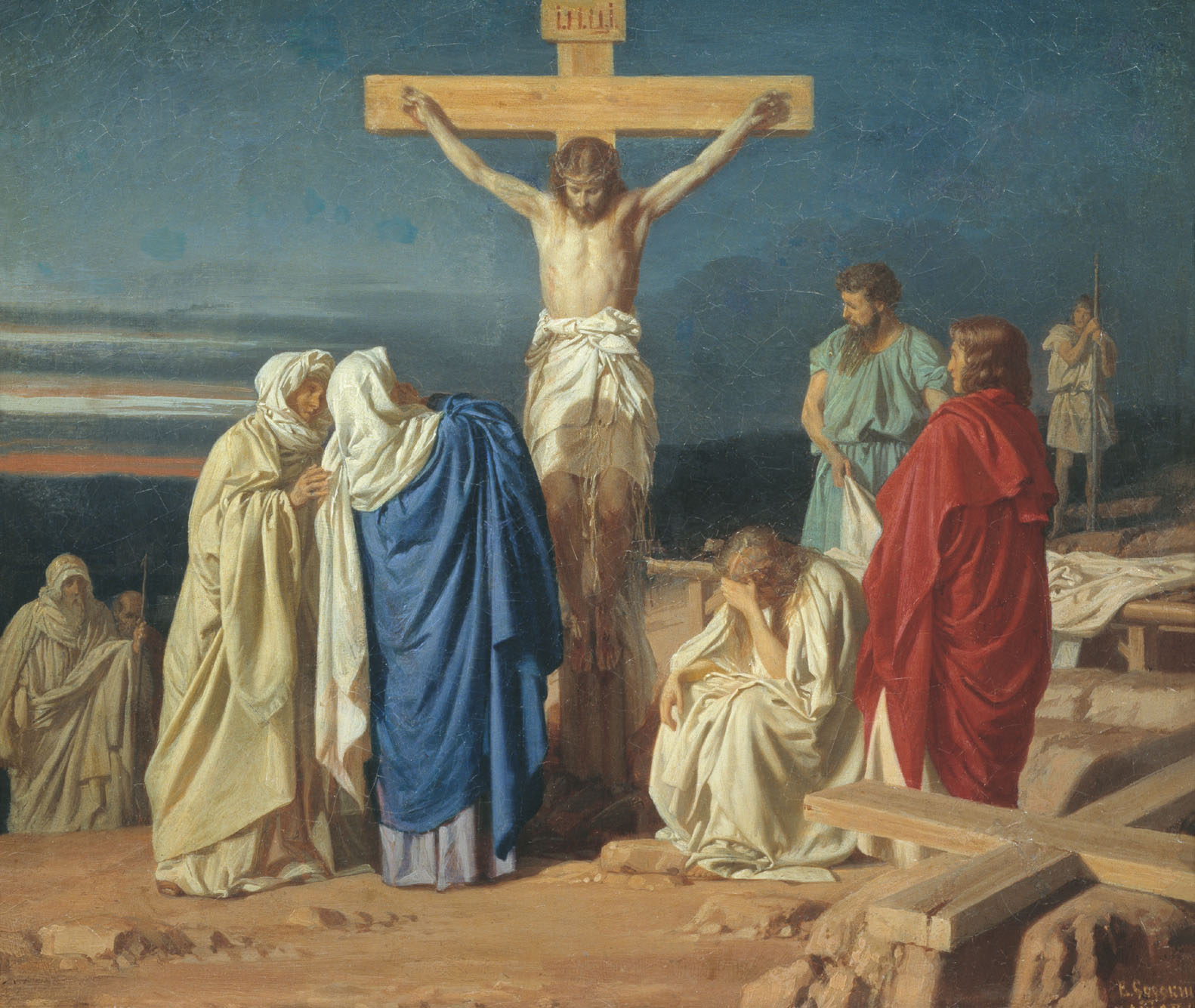
Crucifixion by Evgraf Semenovich Sorokin (1873)

The composer structured the Stabat Mater in ten movements, and scored it for four vocal soloists, soprano (S), alto (A), tenor (T) and bass (B)), a four-part choir (SATB) with sometimes divided voices, a symphony orchestra and organ. The orchestra features parts for two flutes, two oboes, cor anglais, two clarinets in A, two bassoons, four French horns (two in F, two in D), two trumpets, three trombones, tuba, timpani, organ and strings. The organ has an independent part accompanying the women's chorus in the fourth movement, but is not used otherwise. Similarly, a single solo phrase in the opening of the second movement is assigned to the cor anglais, which is otherwise absent. Though not specified in the score, it can be played by one of the two oboists, as they are not playing during this section. The approximate duration of the work is 90 minutes.

In the following table of movements, the movement number is followed by the beginning of the text, the stanzas set in the movement (counting three lines as one stanza), the vocal performers (choir and solo), the tempo marking at the beginning, time signatures and key. The symbol is used to denote common time (4/4).

Movements of Stabat Mater
| No. | Title | Stanzas | Choral | Solo | Tempo | Time | Key |
|---|---|---|---|---|---|---|---|
| 1 | Stabat Mater | 1–4 | SATB | S A T B | Andante con moto | 3/2 | B minor |
| 2 | Quis est homo | 5–8 | | S A T B | Andante sostenuto | 3/4 | E minor |
| 3 | Eja, Mater | 9 | SATB | | Andante con moto | common time | C minor |
| 4 | Fac, ut ardeat cor meum | 10–11 | SSAATB | B | Largo | 4/8 | B♭ minor |
| 5 | Tui nati vulnerati | 12 | SATB | | Andante con moto, quasi allegretto | 6/8 | E♭ major |
| 6 | Fac me vere tecum flere | 13–14 | TTBB | T | Andante con moto | 6/8 | B major |
| 7 | Virgo virginum praeclara | 15 | SATB | | Largo | 3/4 | A major |
| 8 | Fac, ut portem Christi mortem | 16–17 | | S T | Larghetto | 4/8 | B minor |
| 9 | Inflammatus et accensus | 18–19 | | A | Largo | common time | D minor |
| 10 | Quando corpus morietur | 20 | SATB | S A T B | Andante con moto | 3/2 | B minor |

=== Movements ===
The music is structured in ten movements which focus on different aspects of the poetry, depicting the suffering of Mary and the compassion of the person reflecting it in various shades of scoring, tempo and key. The music of the first and last movements shares themes, framing the composition. The movements offer a rich variation in vocal scoring, from one solo voice to various combinations of solo voices, solo voice with choir, and choir alone. While nine movements remain in slow tempo and reflect Mary's suffering in compassionate meditation, the quicker final movement offers a vision of paradise.

==== 1 ====
The first movement, beginning "Stabat Mater dolorosa" (The sorrowful Mother stood [by the cross]), is a setting of the first four stanzas from the poem, scored for the choir, the quartet of soloists and the full orchestra. The movement is an extended sonata form in symphonic style. It opens with a long orchestral introduction, which is repeated with the choir. A contrasting second theme is introduced by the soloists. A development section leads to the return of the opening material.

==== 2 ====
The second movement is assigned to the quartet of soloists. Beginning "Quis est homo, qui non fleret" (What person would not weep), it is a setting of stanzas five to eight from the poem.

==== 3 ====
The third movement, a setting of the ninth stanza from the poem, "Eja, Mater, fons amoris" (Look at the mother, the source of love), resembles a funeral march for choir and orchestra.

==== 4 ====
The fourth movement is a solo for the bass singing the tenth stanza, "Fac, ut ardeat cor meum" (Make my heart burn). It is interrupted by short comments from the choir which is first a four-part women's choir (SSAA), later joined by the men, singing the eleventh stanza, "Sancta mater, istud agas" (Holy mother, make this).

==== 5 ====
The fifth movement, for the choir, sets the twelfth stanza, "Tui nati vulnerati" (Of your wounded son).

==== 6 ====
The sixth movement, setting the 13th and 14th stanzas, "Fac me vere tecum flere" (Make me really weep with you), is sung alternately by the solo tenor and a four-part men's choir.

==== 7 ====
The seventh movement is sung by the choir, at times a cappella. It is a setting of the 15th stanza, beginning "Virgo virginum praeclara" (Virgin pre-eminent among virgins).

==== 8 ====
The eighth movement is a duet for soprano and tenor soloists, setting the 16th and 17th stanzas, beginning "Fac, ut portem Christi mortem" (Grant that I may bear the death of Christ).

==== 9 ====
The ninth movement is a setting of the 18th and 19th stanzas for the solo alto, "Inflammatus et accensus" (Inflamed and afire).

==== 10 ====
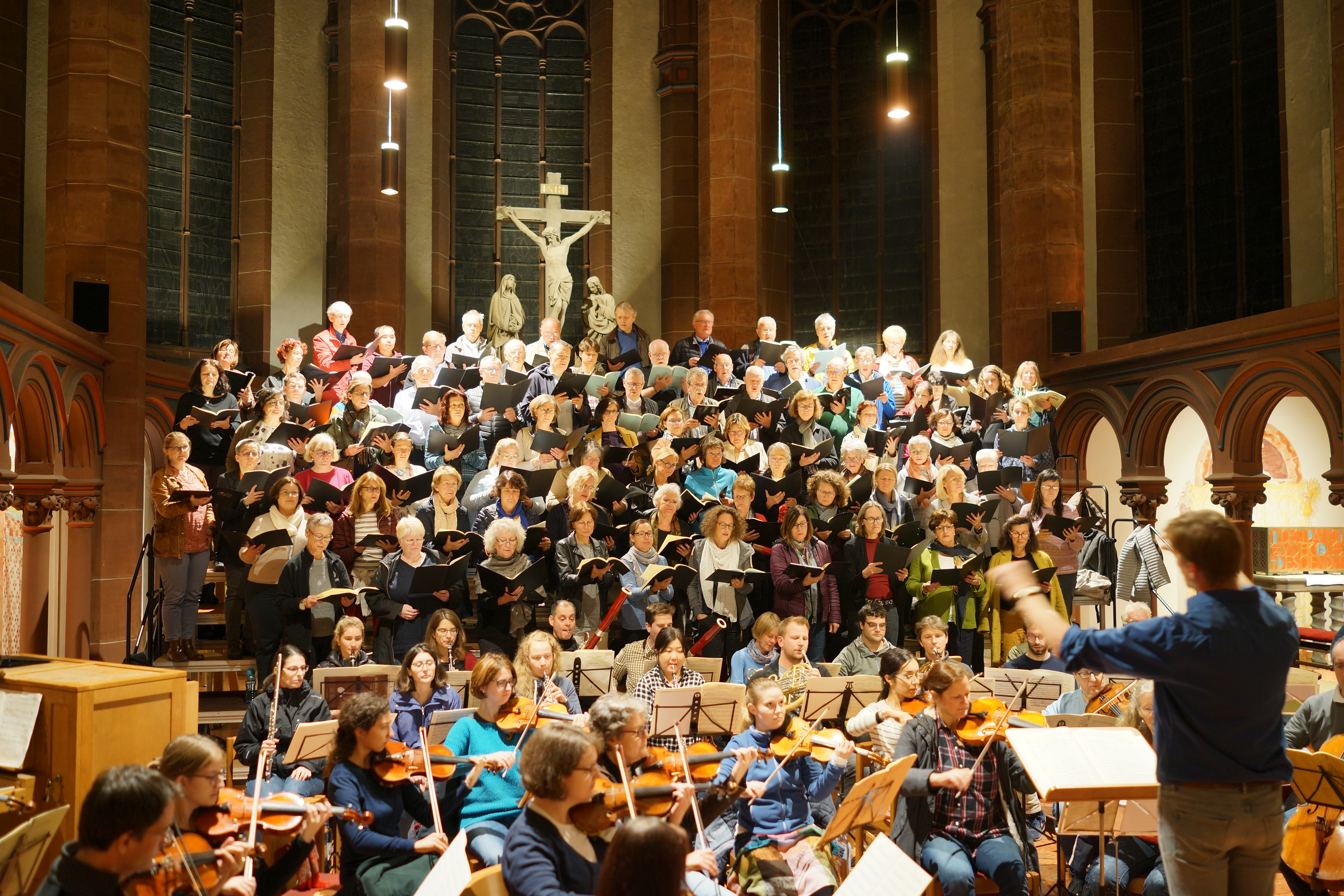
Dress rehearsal for Stabat Mater in St. Bonifatius, Wiesbaden, on 25 October 2019, with Mary standing under the Cross in the background

The final movement sets the ultimate stanza, beginning "Quando corpus morietur" (When the body will die), then praying for the glory of paradise for the soul ("paradisi gloria"). The movement recalls themes from the first movement and is set for the same forces It ends with an uplifting fugue in a major key on the word "Amen".

== Reception ==
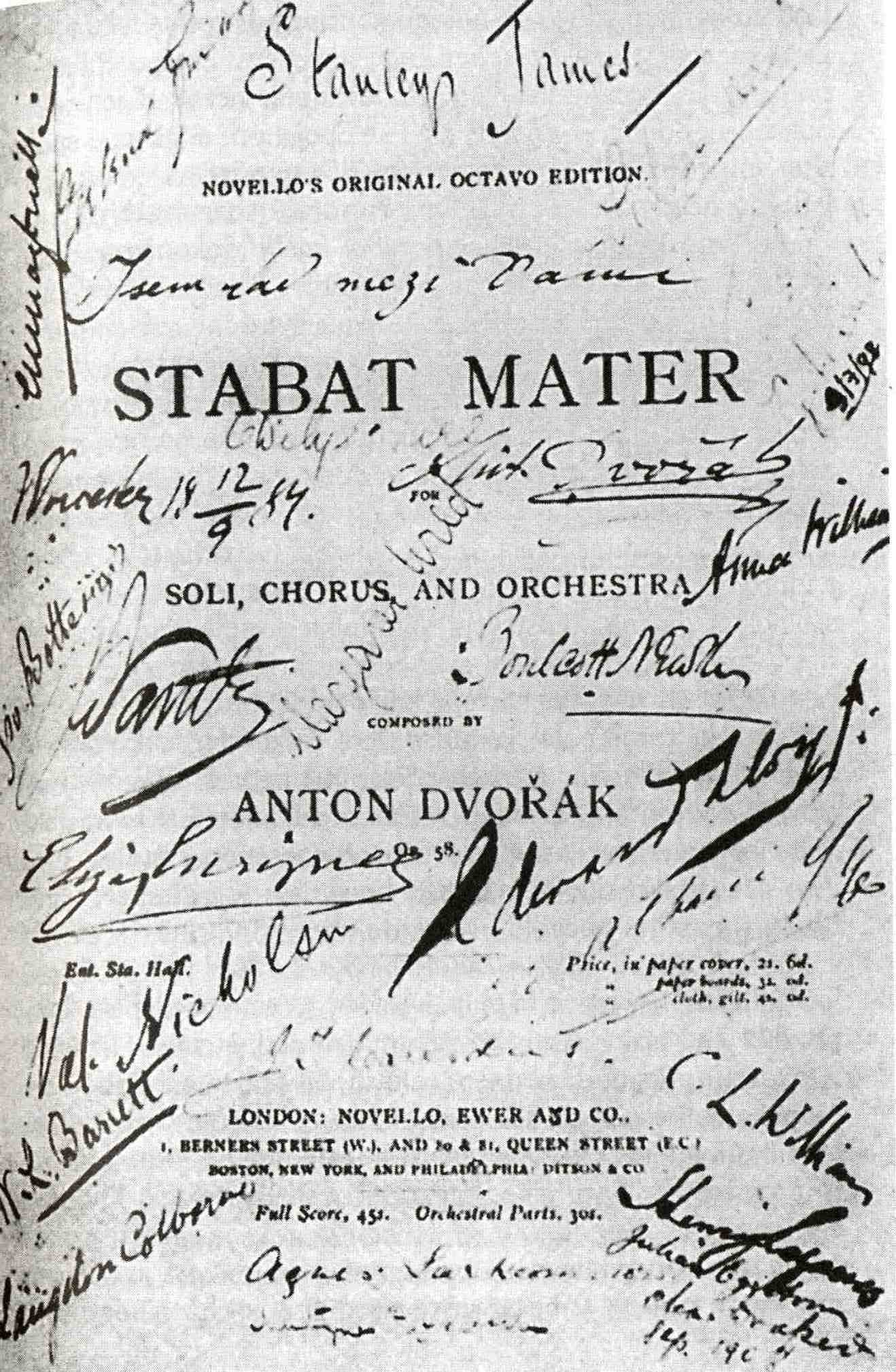
Title page of Novello's edition of the score of Dvořák's Stabat Mater: memento of the performance in Worcester on 12 September 1884, with signatures by Antonín Dvořák and members of the orchestra.

The first performance of Dvořák's Stabat Mater took place on 23 December 1880 at the concert of the Association of Musical Artists in Prague. The performers included the operatic ensemble of the Czech Provisional Theatre, under the conductor Adolf Čech, with the soloists Eleanora Ehrenbergů, Betty Fibich, Antonín Vávra and Karel Čech. Leoš Janáček conducted the work a year and half later, on 2 April 1882, in Brno. A performance in Budapest soon ensued. The work was performed in London in 1883, and again, in the Royal Albert Hall, in 1884, and thus played a crucial role in Dvořák's international breakthrough as a composer. In the 21st century the Stabat Mater continues to be Dvořák's best known, and most often performed, sacred work.

=== Score publications ===
In 1879 Dvořák suggested his Stabat Mater for publication to Fritz Simrock, but it wasn't until after the successful 1880 Prague première of the work that he got the publisher interested. Simrock suggested to change the original opus number (Op. 28) to a more recent number: the work was published as Dvořák's Op. 58 by the N. Simrock firm in 1881. The publication included a vocal score with a piano reduction by Josef Zubatý. Full score and vocal score were published by Novello & Co, in the Novello's Original Octavo Edition series, in 1883.

In the second half of the 1950s the Stabat Mater was published as Vol. II/1 of Souborné vydání děl Antonína Dvořáka (SAD, Complete Edition of Antonín Dvořák's Works):

- The vocal score was published in 1956, with a piano reduction by Karel Šolc.
- The full score, edited by Antonín Čubr, appeared in 1958. Otakar Šourek wrote the preface of this edition.

In Jarmil Burghauser's thematic catalogue of Dvořák's compositions the Stabat Matar was given the number B. 71. In 2004 there were two new vocal score editions of Dvořák's Stabat Mater:

- Bärenreiter published a vocal score based on Dvořák's 1876–1877 draft version, edited by Jan Kachlík and Miroslav Srnka.
- Klaus Döge revised Josef Zubatý's piano reduction, working away discrepancies with the orchestral score.

Carus published Joachim Linckelmann's arrangement of Dvořák's Stabat Mater for chamber orchestra in 2016. The vocal score published with this edition was Petra Morath-Pusinelli's revision of Josef Zubatý's piano reduction.

=== Recordings ===
- Václav Talich conducting the Czech Philharmonic Orchestra, with Drahomíra Tikalová, Marta Krásová, Beno Blachut, Karel Kalaš.
- Václav Smetáček conducting the Czech Philharmonic Orchestra, with Stefania Woytowicz, Věra Soukupová, Ivo Žídek, Kim Borg.
- Robert Shaw conducting the Atlanta Symphony Orchestra and Chorus, with Christine Goerke, Marietta Simpson, Stanford Olsen, Nathan Berg.
- Wolfgang Sawallisch conducting the Czech Philharmonic Orchestra, with Gabriela Beňačková-Čápová, Ortrun Wenkel, Peter Dvorský, Jan-Hendrik Rootering.
- Jiří Bělohlávek conducting the Czech Philharmonic Orchestra, with Lívia Ághová, Marga Schiml, Aldo Baldin, Luděk Vele (1997).
- Zdeněk Mácal conducting the New Jersey Symphony Orchestra, with Kaaren Erickson, Claudine Carlson, John Aler, John Cheek.
- Helmuth Rilling conducting the Oregon Bach Festival Orchestra, with Marina Shaguch, Ingeborg Danz, James Taylor, Thomas Quasthoff.
- Rafael Kubelik conducting the Bavarian Radio Symphony Orchestra, with Edith Mathis, Anna Reynolds, Wieslaw Ochman, John Shirley-Quirk.
- Giuseppe Sinopoli conducting the Staatskapelle Dresden, with Mariana Zvetkova, Ruxandra Donose, Johan Botha, Roberto Scandiuzzi.
- Mariss Jansons conducting the Bavarian Radio Symphony Orchestra, with Erin Wall, Mihoko Fujimura, Christian Elsner, Liang Li.
- Marek Štryncl conducting the Musica Florea, with Michaela Šrůmová, Sylvia Čmugrová, Aleš Briscein, Tomáš Šelc.

The 1876 version of seven movements for vocal quartet, choir and piano was recorded in 2009 by soloists, the Accentus ensemble, conducted by Laurence Equilbey, with pianist Brigitte Engerer. The Chor des Bayerischen Rundfunks recorded that version in 2019, with pianist Julius Drake, conducted by Howard Arman.

== Sources ==
- Clements, Andrew (2 May 2008). "Dvořák: Stabat Mater, Engerer / Accentus / Equilbey". The Guardian.
- Cookson, Michael (December 2015). "Antonín Dvořák (1841–1904) / Stabat mater". musicweb-international.com.
- Döge, Klaus. "Antonín Dvořák (1841–1904) / Stabat mater Op. 58 / Urtext edited by Klaus Döge (solos,ch,orch) duration: 86'". breitkopf.com. Breitkopf & Härtel.
- Döge, Klaus [in German]; Zubatý, Josef, eds. (2004). Dvořák — Stabat Mater for soloists, choir and orchestra, op. 58. Urtext (Piano Vocal Score ed.). Breitkopf & Härtel. ISMN 979-0-004-18195-9. EB 8631.
- Dotsey, Calvin (2018). "A Light in the Darkness: Dvořák's Stabat Mater". Houston Symphony.
- Kachlík, Jan; Srnka, Miroslav, eds. (2004). Dvořák Stabat Mater Op. 58: Piano part by Antonín Dvořák. Bärenreiter Urtext. Prague: Bärenreiter. H 7920.
- Linckelmann, Joachim; Berná, Lucie Harasim, eds. (2016). Antonín Dvořák: Stabat Mater op. 58. Translated by Kosviner, David (Arrangement for soloists, chorus and chamber orchestra ed.). Carus. 27.293/50.
- Morath-Pusinelli, Petra; Zubatý, Josef; Berná, Lucie Harasim, eds. (2016). Antonín Dvořák: Stabat Mater op. 58 (PDF). Translated by Kosviner, David (Vocal score ed.). Carus. 27.293/03.
- Šourek, Otakar [in Czech]; Čubr, Antonín, eds. (1958). Antonín Dvořák: Stabat Mater Op. 58. The Complete Works of Antonín Dvorák. Vol. II/1 (Full score ed.). Prague: Státní nakladatelství krásné literatury, hudby a umění. H 2190.
- Šourek, Otakar [in Czech]; Čubr, Antonín, eds. (2000). Antonín Dvořák: Stabat Mater op. 58. The Complete Works of Antonín Dvorák. Vol. II/1 (Study score ed.). Prague: Bärenreiter. H 2268.
- Šourek, Otakar [in Czech]; Šolc, Karel, eds. (1956). Antonín Dvořák: Stabat Mater op. 58. The Complete Works of Antonín Dvorák. Vol. II/1 (Vocal score ed.). Prague: Státní nakladatelství krásné literatury, hudby a umění. H 1882.
- Šourek, Otakar [in Czech]; Šolc, Karel, eds. (2002). Antonín Dvořák: Stabat Mater op. 58. The Complete Works of Antonín Dvorák. Vol. II/1 (Vocal score ed.). Prague: Bärenreiter. H 1882.
- "Stabat Mater". www.antonin-dvorak.cz.
- Vaughan, David (28 March 2005). "Music for Easter: Dvorak's Stabat Mater – one of the most powerful declarations of faith in musical history". Radio Prague.
