= Libuše (opera) =

Opera by Bedřich Smetana

- Opera by Bedřich Smetana
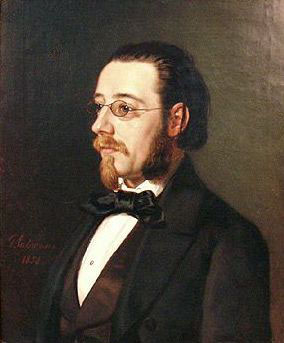
- Smetana in 1854, painting by Geskel Saloman
- Librettist: Josef Wenzig
- Language: Czech
- Premiere: 11 June 1881; National Theatre, Prague

Libuše is a "festival opera" in three acts, with music by Bedřich Smetana. The libretto was originally written in German by Josef Wenzig, and was then translated into Czech by Ervín Špindler. In Czech historical myth, Libuše, the title character, prophesied the founding of Prague.

== Background ==
The opera was composed in 1871–72. From the very beginning, the new opera's premiere was destined to mark a major, exceptional event. After abandoning an initial idea to dedicate it to the coronation of the Austrian Emperor as King of Bohemia (which actually never happened), Smetana focused on a historic occasion whose dimension was indeed exclusively national, namely, the inauguration of the National Theatre in Prague. Consequently, the premiere had to wait for nine years after the opera's completion, until 11 June, 1881. After that, Libuše was also performed as part of the National Theatre's definitive reopening on 18 November, 1883, following its previous destruction by a fire disaster. By then, however, Smetana had already suffered a complete loss of hearing and was unable to listen to his music. Smetana's aim was to create a ”glorious tableau”. He carried out his declared task with honour, and being a consummate dramatist he did not in the process limit himself to producing a static illustration of a well-known story. Rather, the opera's score stands out for its wealth of musical architecture, alternating monumental passages with lyric images of nature, professions of love with scenes of strife packed with drama, a rustic dance with a ceremonial march. Commentators have noted the pageant-like nature of the opera and the influence of Richard Wagner in the music. Finally, the whole is topped off by a closing scene of Libuše's prophecy, manifesting confidence in the lasting vitality and glory of the Czech nation. Smetana was well aware of his opera's exceptional status; he did not intend it to become a standard repertoire number, but wished its performances to be limited to ”festive occasions marked by the entire Czech nation”. This wish of the composer has since his time continued to be the norm to this day.

== Roles ==
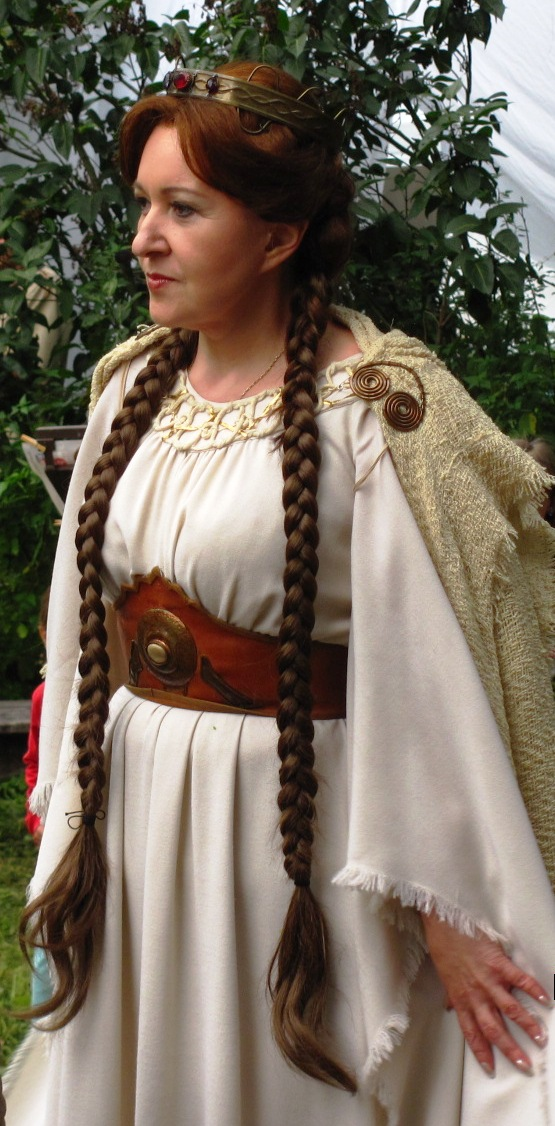
Eva Urbanová as Libuše (2010)

Role	Voice type	Premiere cast, 11 June 1881 (Conductor: Adolf Čech)
Queen Libuše	soprano	Marie Sittová
Chrudoš	bass	Karel Čech
Sťáhlav, younger brother of Chrudoš	tenor	Antonín Vávra
Radmilla, sister to Chrudoš and Sťáhlav	contralto	Betty Fibichová
Krasava	soprano	Irma Reichová
Lutobor, father to Krasava	bass	František Hynek
Přemysl, a farmer from Stadice	baritone	Josef Lev
Radovan	baritone	Leopold Stropnický

== Synopsis ==
=== Act 1 ===
At the majestic castle of Vyšehrad, the Czech princess Libuše is set to adjudicate a dispute between two brothers, Chrudoš and Šťáhlav, over their father's legacy. Czech law dictates either co-management or equal division of the land. German law, which Chrudoš, the elder, favours, would demand primogeniture, where the elder sibling would inherit the entire property. Libuše prays to the gods for her people's unity. At the same time, Krasava confides to Radmila, the brothers' sister, with her concerns about the dispute's outcome. Libuše's judgment stipulates an equal division of the estate between the two brothers. Hot-blooded Chrudoš refuses to accept the verdict, claiming that it's not for a woman to judge in a men's dispute. Feeling humiliated, the princess decides to give the Czechs a male prince, and to become his consort. She sends out a deputation to Přemysl of Stadice, with whom she has long been in love.

=== Act 2 ===
At the burial mound of the two brothers' father, Krasava confesses to her father, Lutobor, that she is the true reason behind the dispute, as she has kindled Chrudoš's jealousy by feigning her love of Šťáhlav. Obeying Lutobor's order, she becomes reconciled with Chrudoš, and presently also has the two brothers make peace between themselves. Meanwhile in Stadice, as the air fills with farmhands' song Přemysl is immersed in loving memories of Libuše. Libuše's deputation arrives, headed by Radovan, to guide Přemysl to Vyšehrad as the princess's future husband and prince of the Czechs.

=== Act 3 ===
At Vyšehrad, Libuše, welcoming peace being restored between the two brothers, gives Krasava to Chrudoš as his wife. Now at Libuše's side, Přemysl assumes his princely powers and calls on Chrudoš to apologize to the princess for the offence. The young hotspur, who has so far stubbornly declined, is now ready to yield. Přemysl gives him a brotherly embrace. All present rejoice at the reconciliation. Under the impact of the auspicious moment, Libuše utters a prophecy envisioning a bright future for the Czech nation (including union with Moravia under Břetislav l; the salvaging of Moravia from Tartar invasion through the endeavour of Jaroslav ze Šternberka; the Kingdom of Bohemia's prosperity during the rules of Přemysl Otakar II and Charles IV; the Hussite era; and the rule of the peacemaker King Jiří z Poděbrad). In her prophecy, Libuše does not fail to mention also the dark periods looming ahead for the Czech nation, but she stays firmly convinced of its perseverance with which it will gloriously prevail even over the “horrors of hell”.

== Orchestration ==
Piccolo, two flutes, two oboes, two clarinets, two bassoons, four horns, four trumpets, three trombones, tuba, timpani, triangle, cymbals, bass drum, harp, strings. Onstage trumpets.

== Performance history ==
Given regularly in Czechoslovakia up to 1992, and the Czech Republic and Slovakia since, it is rarity elsewhere. The first US performance was on 13 March 1986, in a concert version at Carnegie Hall with Eve Queler and the Opera Orchestra of New York and Gabriela Beňačková in the title role. The cast was prepared in the Czech language by Yveta Synek Graff. Libuše was given in concert form at the Edinburgh International Festival on 4 September 1998, with Eva Urbanová and a Czech cast, the BBC Scottish Symphony Orchestra conducted by Oliver von Dohnányi. The first UK staged performance was by University College Opera in 2019.

== Recordings ==
- 1949, Alois Klíma (conductor), Symphony Orchestra and Chorus of the Prague Radio; Marie Podvalová, Theodor Šrubař, Karel Kalaš, Beno Blachut, Jaroslav Veverka, Bořek Rujan, Ludmila Červinková, Marta Krásová
- 1966, Jaroslav Krombholc (conductor), Prague National Theatre Orchestra and Chorus; Naděžda Kniplová, Vacláv Bednár, Věra Soukupová, Zdeněk Kroupa, Ivo Žídek, Karel Berman, Jindrich Jindrák, Milada Šubrtová
- 1983, Zdeněk Košler (conductor), Prague National Theatre Orchestra and Chorus; Gabriela Beňačková, Václav Zítek, Antonín Švorc, Leo Marian Vodička, Eva Děpoltová, Karel Prusa, René Tucek, Věra Soukupová
- 1995, Oliver Dohnányi (conductor), Prague National Theatre Orchestra and Chorus; Eva Urbanová, Vratislav Kříž, Luděk Vele, Miloslav Podskalský, Miroslava Volková, Jan Markvart, Pavel Červinka, Helena Kaupová

* 2024 Jakub Hrůša (conductor), Czech Philharmonic, Kateřina Kněžíková ( Soprano) (2026, Supraphon CD SU 4378-2/0/5)
