= Saint Ludmila (oratorio) =

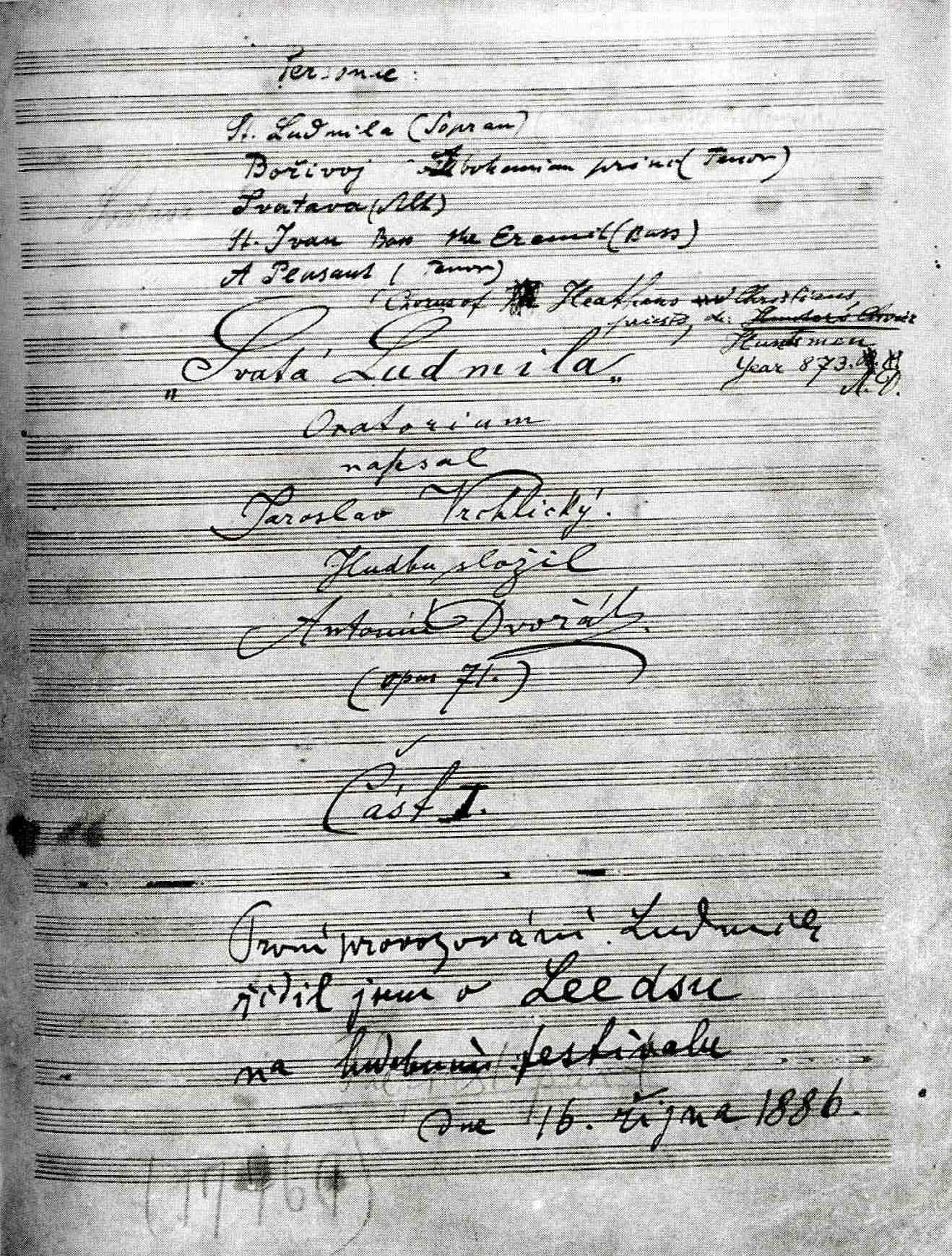
The title page of the autograph score of Dvořák's Saint Ludmila with inscription in the author's hand: "I conducted the first performance of ‘Saint Ludmila’ at the music festival in Leeds on October 16, 1886." Nevertheless, the first performance took place on October 15, 1886. The note in the score is inaccurate.

Antonín Dvořák composed his oratorio Saint Ludmila (Czech: Svatá Ludmila (cs) for soloists, choir and orchestra, between September 1885 and May 1886. The oratorio (Op. 71, B. 144) was written to a text by the leading Czech poet and writer Jaroslav Vrchlický. Saint Ludmila is Dvořák's third oratorio, and is considered one of his foremost works.

== Background ==
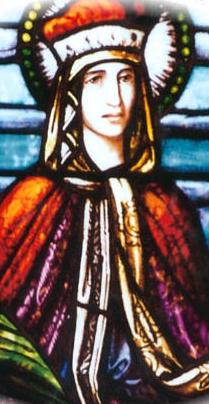
The image of Saint Ludmila from a stained glass window at St. Ludmila's Church, Cedar Rapids, Iowa.

The work was commissioned by the publisher Littleton during Dvořák's first visit to England. It was intended for the Leeds Festival, and Dvořák, well acquainted with the English festival tradition, was attracted by the idea. He was also impressed by the high standard of English orchestras and choirs, and particularly by their performances of oratorios. On the other hand, he was also inspired by his own religiousness; he composed many works to Christian religious texts, as well as Hussite Overture, a "protestant" instrumental work.

Chronologically Saint Ludmila follows Symphony No. 7 in D Minor (finished in March, 1885), and both works are influenced by the actual historical events of that time. The year 1884 was restless for the Czechs; they organized demonstrations and patriotic manifestations of solidarity in the fight for freedom, the Austrian police had forbidden the singing of Czech songs, and the social situation was very tense. Dvořák turned to typical Czech and Slavonic themes during this time in order to support the national movement, although he was approached by his German publisher Simrock to depart from patriotic themes and instead create works based on world famous literary works. Dvořák, however, refused in one of his letters to Simrock saying, "... an artist also has a country for which he must have firm faith and a fervent heart." The work is thus of a national rather than religious character, which is apparent mainly in the choral scenes.

The first performance was not well received; the work was criticised for its length, its Czech theme and also for its alleged musical dependence on George Frideric Handel, Felix Mendelssohn, Richard Wagner, Joseph Haydn and Ludwig van Beethoven. Dvořák later rewrote and reduced several parts of the composition. Saint Ludmila was premiered in Prague in 1901, and the first performance with the Czech Philharmonic Orchestra took place on 3 April 1904. However, Dvořák was seriously ill and did not attend this performance.

Saint Ludmila has a long performance tradition on Czech concert stages. It was given at the third Prague Spring International Music Festival in 1948, conducted by Rafael Kubelík. It was Kubelík's last public performance in his native country for many years. In November 1954 the Czech Philharmonic with Karel Šejna performed the work at two concerts in the Smetana Hall of the Municipal House in Prague. In 1987 another concert took place, this time with the conductor Václav Neumann. The first performance in the 21st century was given in 2004, one hundred years after Dvořák's death, with the Czech Philharmonic and conductor Jiří Bělohlávek.

January 2026, Grammy-nominated artist Anastasia Vedyakova has been conducting the first performance of the oratorio «Saint Ludmila» in Russia (the oratorio hasn't been performed in Russian Empire, the USSR and Russia previously).

== Structure ==
The verses of the libretto are based on historical fact. Prince Rastislav of Moravia asked the brothers Cyril and Methodius of Thessalonica to spread Christianity in his country. In 863 they came bringing the Glagolitic alphabet which laid the foundation of Slavonic literature. During this time, Great Moravia came under the influence of the Byzantine Empire. Later, this cultural and political influence spread also to Bohemia and in 874, Bořivoj I, Duke of Bohemia and his wife Saint Ludmila were baptised.

The story is set at the beginning of this era. The hermit Ivan accepts the task of missionary, his eloquence winning over Ludmila, the Bohemian princess. She meets Prince Bořivoj and they are then married. Bořivoj is baptised under the influence of the new teaching and becomes Christian.

The libretto consists of three parts. The situation in the first part is tense as Ivan comes into conflict with the pagans. Ludmila intervenes. In the second part Dvořák applied his talent for melody and ability to express feelings of love. The finale is festive and pompous with a statement of the ancient Czech chorale "Hospodine, pomiluj ny" ("Mighty Lord, have mercy upon us") which dates from about the eleventh century. The composition has been appreciated for its melodiousness and colourful instrumentation.

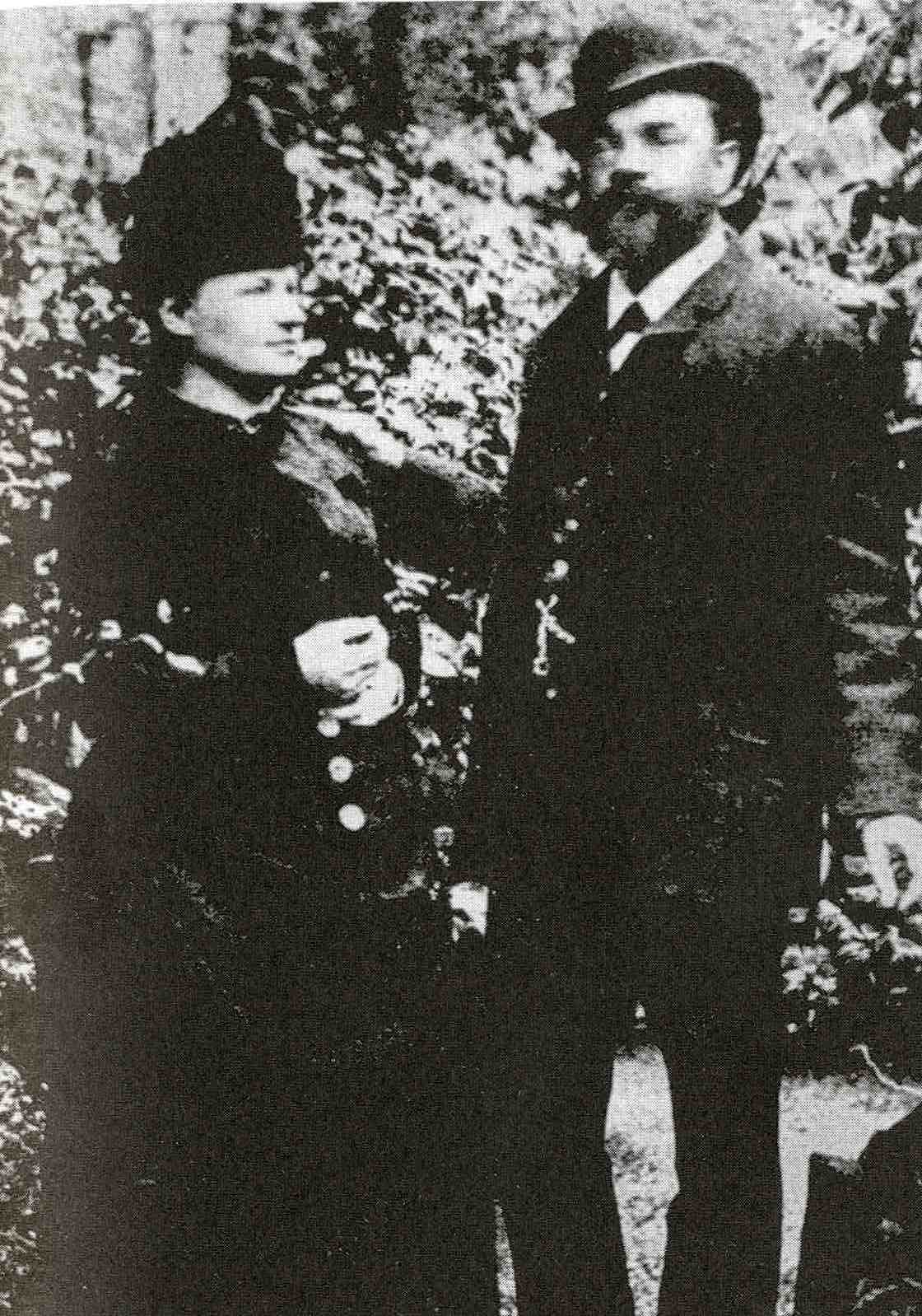
Antonín Dvořák with his wife Anna in London, 1886

=== Part I ===
1. Introduzione, Coro ("Tmy vrátily se v skrýše skal a lesů" / "The dusk departs to gloomy caves and forests")
2. Recitativo — tenore ("Vesno smavá, Vesno snivá" / "Merry Springtime, dreamy Springtime")
3. Coro ("Květy, jimiž Vesna vábí" / "Blossoms, with which Spring allures us")
4. Coro ("Svaté jitro jest a svatá noc je tmavá" / "Holy dawn and holy night")
5. Coro ("Tříhlav, který patří trojí tváří" / "Triglav, thou with threefold countenance")
6. Recitativo — soprano ("Mé srdce chví se tlukem bouřným dnes" / "My heart is beating wildly")
7. Coro ("Slyš naše písně horoucí a vroucí" / "Hear when we call")
8. Aria — soprano ("Od dětství ku oltáři mne vodil svatý cit" / "When young it was the altar I ever held most dear")
9. Coro ("Vždy bozi s námi jsou, kam bludný krok se šine" / "The gods are close at hand, where'er we stray and falter")
10. Solo — tenore ("Sem rychle Vesny květ, ať sochu ověnčíme" / "Festoon with flowers gay the statue of great Vesna")
11. Coro ("Ký v pozadí to hluk?" / What causes all that noise?")
12. Aria — basso; Coro ("Do prachu s vámi! Jeden jest Bůh!" / "Now kiss the dust all! One God there is!")
13. Coro ("Kdo onen muž, jejž nestih' s nebe blesk?" / "What man is this whom lightning will not fell?")
14. Aria — soprano ("Ó dovol, abych zlíbat směla tvých nohou prach" / "I beg thee, only thy dusty feet my lips I would lay")
15. Recitativo — basso ("Vstup v nitro své, mým bytem není země" / "Upon this earth thy search would be a vain quest")
16. Coro ("Co bude nyní" / "What will befall us?")
17. Coro ("Vše láme se a bortí v chaos tmavý" / "Now everything is crumbling, all is chaos")

=== Part II ===
1. Introduzione, Recitativo ed aria — alto ("Ó v jaké šeré lesní stíny" / "Oh, in the fearful forest shadows")
2. Duetto — soprano ed alto ("Teď ptám se tě: co najít chceš?" / "Pray tell me now, what do you seek?")
3. Aria — basso ("Já neklamal se, buď vítána dcero!" / "No error made, I welcome you, daughter!")
4. Recitativo — soprano ("Dík, otče, já se nezklamala" / "Thanks, father, I am firmly resolved")
5. Aria — basso ("Nuž tedy věz a pojmi v srdce svoje" / "Now also know, and keep it in remembrance")
6. Recitativo — soprano ("Ó dopřej, ať se v pokoře dál cvičím" / "O cease not, let me meekly hear thy teaching")
7. Terzetto — soprano, alto e basso ("Tam Kristův kříž!" / "Behold Christ's Cross!")
8. Coro; Terzetto — soprano, alto e basso ("Vesele hvozdem, vesele polem" / "Gaily we pass through field and through forest")
9. Solo — tenore; Coro ("Ó jaký obraz oku mému se v stínu lesním otvírá!" / "Oh, what a sight there in the shadows")
10. Recitativo — basso ("Já bludné duše světlu vracím" / "I led the lost souls out of darkness")
11. Coro ("Ó neklamu se, chápu juž" / "I think, the truth I now infer")
12. Recitativo — tenore; basso ("Ach ona, po níž srdce moje prahne" / "Ah, it is she for whom my heart is yearning")
13. Aria — tenore ("Ó cestu ukaž mi, jak ji mám dobýt" / "Oh, show to me the way that I must win her")
14. Coro ("Ó vizte, kníže náš vrhá se na kolena" / "Behold ye now our prince is kneeling")
15. Recitativo — soprano ("Ó kterak mohu zvednout k tobě zraků" / "How is it possible to raise my eyelids")
16. Coro ("Ó běda, nechce slyšet jeho lkání!" / "Oh, heavens! She shall not listen to his pleading!")
17. Recitativo — tenore, basso ("Jak z krásného snu náhle procitlý" / "I rudely awake from a perfect dream")
18. Quartetto, Coro ("Ó hledala jsem září toho jitra" / "For this new shining dawn I am now searching")

=== Part III ===
1. Introduzione, Coro ("Hospodine, pomiluj ny!" / "Mighty Lord, have mercy on us!")
2. Recitativo — tenore, basso ("Nuž přistupte, mnou víře vyučení" / "Come forward all to whom I have taught the new creed!")
3. Duetto — soprano e tenore ("Ó nech juž skanout nad našimi čely" / "Anoint our foreheads with the holy water")
4. Recitativo — soprano, basso ("U cíle stojím snahy své a tužby" / "Here on the threshold of my aspirations")
5. Coro ("Nuž poklekněte před biskupem oba" / "Now kneel ye both before the bishop")
6. Solo — basso, Coro ("Duchu svatý, sestup v nachu" / "Holy Ghost in royal purple")
7. Coro ("Ó zněte písně, zněte k nebes báni" / "Now let the heavens echo with our anthem")
8. Solo — alto, Coro ("Panno, matko stvořitele" / "Powers that dwell in heavenly places")
9. Coro e duetto — alto e basso ("Ó zněte písně, zněte k nebes báni" / "Now let the heavens echo with our anthem")
10. Quartetto e coro ("Hospodine, pomiluj ny!" / "Mighty Lord, have mercy on us!")

== Roles ==
Role	Voice type	Premiere cast, October 15, 1886 (Conductor: Antonín Dvořák)
Ludmila	soprano	Madame Emma Albani
Svatava	mezzo-soprano	Madame Janet Patey
Bořivoj	tenor	Edward Lloyd
Peasant	tenor	
Ivan the Hermit	bass	Charles Santley

== Performance history ==
Performance history of Dvořák's Saint Ludmila.

- Leeds, Great Britain: 15 October 1886, conducted by Dvořák himself
- London, Great Britain: 29 October 1886, conducted by Dvořák himself
- London, Great Britain: 6 November 1886, conducted by Dvořák himself
- Prague, Austria-Hungary: 25 February 1887, conducted by Dvořák himself
- Prague, Austria-Hungary: 27 February 1887, conducted by Dvořák himself
- Prague, Austria-Hungary: 6 November 1887, conducted by Dvořák himself
- Prague, Austria-Hungary: 11 November 1887, conducted by Dvořák himself
- Prague, Austria-Hungary: 25 November 1887, conducted by Dvořák himself

== Recordings ==
- Dvořák: Svatá Ludmila – Lívia Ághová. WDR Sinfonieorchester Köln, Gerd Albrecht (2000)
- Dvořák: Svatá Ludmila – Eva Zikmundová, Beno Blachut. Prague Symphony Orchestra, Václav Smetáček (1963)
