= The Jacobin =

Operatic pastoral comedy by Antonín Dvořák

- Opera by Antonín Dvořák
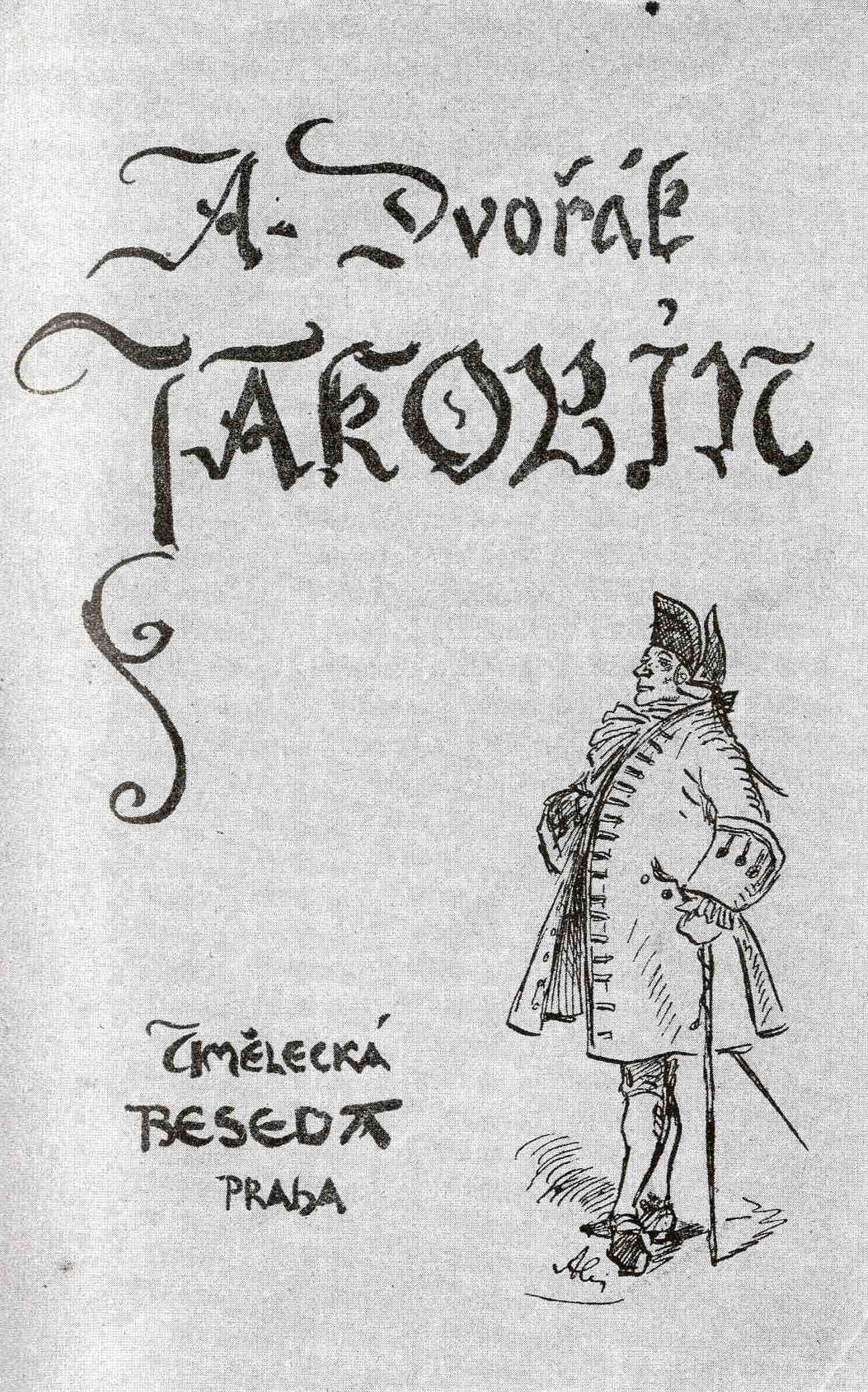
- Cover of the piano reduction by Mikoláš Aleš, 1911
- Librettist: Marie Červinková-Riegrová
- Language: Czech
- Premiere: 12 February 1889; National Theatre, Prague

Jakobín, (Note: Czech) or The Jacobin (Note: English), is an operatic pastoral comedy in three acts by Antonín Dvořák, his Op. 84 (B. 159). Its Czech libretto by Marie Červinková-Riegrová employs characters from Alois Jirásek's story At the Ducal Court but in a plot of her devising. The opera's first performance took place on 9 February 1889 at the National Theatre in Prague with Adolf Čech conducting; it was however revised by both librettist (in 1894) and composer (in 1897) and premiered again, under Čech, on 19 June 1898, with notable adjustments to the last act, in the version that has since been standard.

== Evaluation ==
Dvořák felt great affection for the subject, as the central character is a music teacher and he had in mind his former teacher Antonín Liehmann, whose daughter Terinka's name is taken by one of the main characters. John Clapham has briefly discussed the presence of Czech musical style in Jakobín. H. C. Colles has described this opera as "the most subtle and intimate of his peasant operas", and noted "how clearly its scenes are drawn from life".

== Roles ==
Role	Voice type	Premiere cast, 9 February 1889 (Conductor: Adolf Čech)
Count Vilém of Harasov	bass	Karel Čech
Bohuš, his son	baritone	Bohumil Benoni
Julie, Bohuš's wife	soprano	Berta Foersterová-Lautererová
Benda, the schoolmaster and choirmaster	tenor	Adolf Krössing
Terinka, his daughter	soprano	Johanna "Hana" Cavallerová-Weisová
Jiří, a young gamekeeper	tenor	Karel Veselý
Filip, the Count's Burgrave (chief-of-staff)	bass	Vilém Heš
Adolf, the Count's nephew	baritone	Václav Viktorin
Lotinka, the keeper of the keys at the castle	contralto	Ema Maislerová-Saková

== Synopsis ==
Place: a small country town in Bohemia
Time: 1793

=== Act 1 ===
Bohuš has returned to his home-town, incognito, with his wife Julie. His mother is dead and his father, the Count, has disowned him and has become a recluse. Meanwhile, the Count's Burgrave pays court to the schoolmaster Benda's daughter, Terinka, who is, however, in love with Jiří. The Burgrave is suspicious of Bohuš and Julie, especially as they have come from Paris, where the Count's son is said to be allied with the Jacobins. To everyone's surprise, the Count himself now appears, confirming that he no longer regards Bohuš as his son, and that his heir will be his nephew Adolf. Adolf and the Burgrave rejoice, while Bohuš and Julie, hidden among the crowd, are horrified at the turn that events have taken.

=== Act 2 ===
In the school, Benda rehearses a chorus of children and townsfolk, together with Terinka and Jiří as soloists, in a cantata which will celebrate Adolf's new position. After the rehearsal, Terinka and Jiří declare their love, but Benda returns and announces that his daughter must marry the Burgrave. An argument develops, but suddenly the people return, alarmed at the rumour that sinister Jacobins have arrived in the town. The townsfolk run away in terror as Bohuš and Julie arrive to ask Benda if he can accommodate them for a few days. He is inclined to refuse, but when they reveal that they are Czechs who have sustained themselves in foreign countries through singing the songs of their native land, he, Terinka and Jiří are overcome with emotion and are happy to shelter them. The Burgrave comes to woo Terinka, but she rejects him. When Jiří defies him, the Burgrave threatens to force him into the army, but suddenly Adolf enters, wanting to find out if the "Jacobin" (Bohuš) has been arrested. The Burgrave prevaricates, but Bohuš himself arrives and reveals who he is. He and Adolf quarrel, and Adolf orders Bohuš's arrest.

=== Act 3 ===
At the castle, Jiří tries to see the Count to tell him that his son has been imprisoned, but is himself arrested at the behest of Adolf and the Burgrave. Lotinka admits Julie and Benda, and goes to fetch the Count. Julie hides, and Benda tries to prepare the old man for a reconciliation with Bohuš. The Count, however, is still angry with his son for marrying and leaving Bohemia and for his alleged Jacobin sympathies. Benda departs, and the Count laments his lonely life and wonders whether he has, after all, misjudged his son. Offstage, Julie sings a song that the late Countess used to sing to Bohuš when he was a child, and the Count, recognising it and overcome with emotion, asks Julie where she learnt it. Once he discovers that it was his son who taught it to her, his anger returns, but Julie is able to convince him that Bohuš, far from being a Jacobin, supported the Girondins and had been condemned to death by the Jacobins. She now reveals that Bohuš is in prison and that she is his wife, but the celebrations are about to start, and she leaves.

The children and townsfolk rejoice, and the Count announces that he will present his successor to them. Adolf is overjoyed, but the Count first enquires of him and the Burgrave whether there are any prisoners that he can pardon as part of the festivities. They reluctantly admit that there are, and Bohuš and Jiří are summoned. The Burgrave realises that the game is up as the Count denounces the scheming Adolf and embraces Bohuš and Julie. Bohuš praises the loyalty of Jiří and Terinka, and the Count joins their hands. Benda gives them his blessing, and the opera ends with a minuet, a polka and a chorus praising the Count and his new-found happiness with his son and his family.

== Recordings ==
- 1943 — Hamburger Archiv Für Gesangskunst, sung in German: Josef Becker, Hans-Jürgen Demitz, Gabriele Maria Ronge, Jörn W. Wilsing, Josef Hopferwieser, Richard Kogel, Wolf Appel; Symphonisches Orchester Berlin; Fritz Weisse, conductor
- c. 1950 — Hamburger Archiv Für Gesangskunst PN 30474, in German: Artur Kern, Robert Granzer, Mirjana Irosch, Rudolf Katzböck, Adolf Dallapozza, Jolanta Radek; Orchester der Wiener Volksoper; Ivan Parik (conductor)
- 1952 — Archipel P 2013, in German: Walter Berry, Andreas Agrelli, Trude Arthold, Franz Fuchs, Leo Heppe, Waldemar Kmentt, Fritz Uhl, Gisela Rathauscher, Susanne Naidic; Tonkünstlerchor, Großes Wiener Rundfunkorchester; Kurt Tenner, conductor
- 1972 — Supraphon 11 2190-2 612, in the original Czech: Karel Průša, Karel Berman, Ivana Mixová, Vilém Přibyl, Beno Blachut, Václav Zítek, René Tuček, Daniela Šounová-Brouková, Marcela Machotková; Kühn mixed choir; Kantilena Children's Chorus; Brno Philharmonic Orchestra; Jiří Pinkas, conductor
- 2001 — Fonè 024 2SACD, in Czech: Valentin Pivovarov, Markus Werba, Alessandro Grato, Tatiana Monogarova; National Philharmonic Orchestra of Belarus, Wexford Festival Opera Chorus; Alexandre Voloschuk, conductor
- 2003 — Orfeo 641 043, in Czech: Mark Holland, Marcin Bronikowski, Christoph Stephinger, Andrea Danková, Peter Mikuláš, Michal Lehotský, Eberhard Francesco Lorenz, Lívia Ághová, Mechthild Georg; Prague Chamber Choir, WDR Rundfunkchor Köln, WDR Sinfonieorchester Köln; Gerd Albrecht, conductor
- 2023 — OperaVision, filmed in Brno, in Czech: Vykopalová, Kaňková, Levíček, Briscein, Hoza, Szendiuch; conducted by Klecker
