= Ludmila Červinková =

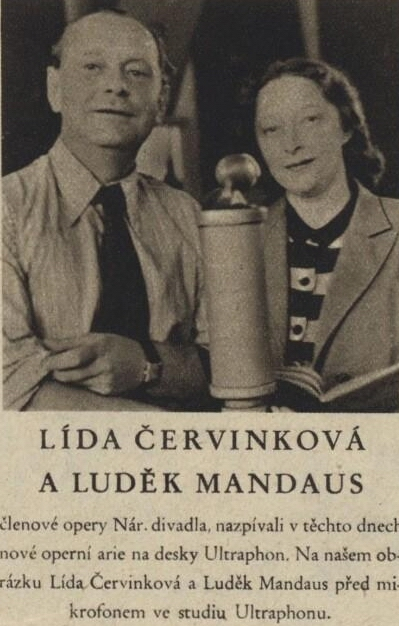
- Ludmila Červinková a Luděk Mandaus (1943)

Background information
- Born: 29 April 1908; Prague, Austria-Hungary
- Died: 16 September 1980 (aged 72) Prague, Czechoslovakia
- Genre: Opera
- Occupation: Singer
- Instrument: Vocals
- Years active: 1934–1966

Ludmila Červinková (29 April 1908 – 16 September 1980) was a Czech operatic soprano who had a celebrated international career during the 1930s through the 1960s. She notably had a long and fruitful association with the National Theatre in Prague from 1942 until 1966. Her voice is preserved on a number of recordings on the Supraphon label.

== Biography ==
Born in Prague, Červinková studied singing privately with Jarmila Pěničková, while attending a girl's college in Prague. From 1928 to 1934 she studied singing at the Prague Conservatory with Doubravka Branbergerová née Černochová (1885–1945). In 1936, she went to Vienna to study with Cecílie Steinbrücková. She continued studying with Pěničková after 1942. She began her career as a principal soprano at the opera house in Olomouc in 1934. She remained at that house for the next six years, after which she was involved with the Zdeněk Nejedlý Theatre in Ostrava from 1940 to 1942. Vaclav Talich attended some of her performances in Ostrava and was impressed by her beautiful voice and dramatic skills. Under his recommendation she was engaged as a member of the National Theatre in Prague in 1942.

Červinková spent the rest of her career at the National Theatre and was one of the house's most important artists during the 1940s through the 1960s. Her repertoire in Prague constituted mainly dramatic soprano and spinto roles, including Donna Anna in Don Giovanni, Julie in The Jacobin, Kostelnička Buryjovka in Jenůfa, Mařenka in The Bartered Bride, Tatyana in Eugene Onegin, Venus in Tannhäuser, and the title roles in Aida, Káťa Kabanová, Libuše, and Tosca among others.

Červinková was also active as a concert singer and was particularly admired for her interpretations of the concert works of Antonín Dvořák. She gave numerous guest performances with the orchestras and opera houses in Moscow and Sofia, and made several appearances at the Berlin State Opera. She made numerous recordings on the Supraphon label, including complete opera recordings of the roles of Vendulka in Bedřich Smetana's The Kiss and the title heroine in Dvořák's Rusalka.

She taught singing, from 1958 at the Music Faculty of the Academy of Performing Arts in Prague (HAMU) and from 1960 at the Prague Conservatory. Červinková retired from the stage in 1966, shortly after being honored with the title of People's Artist of the USSR. She then devoted herself to teaching
