= Dimitrij (opera) =

Czech-language grand opera in four acts by Antonín Dvořák

- Grand opera by Antonín Dvořák
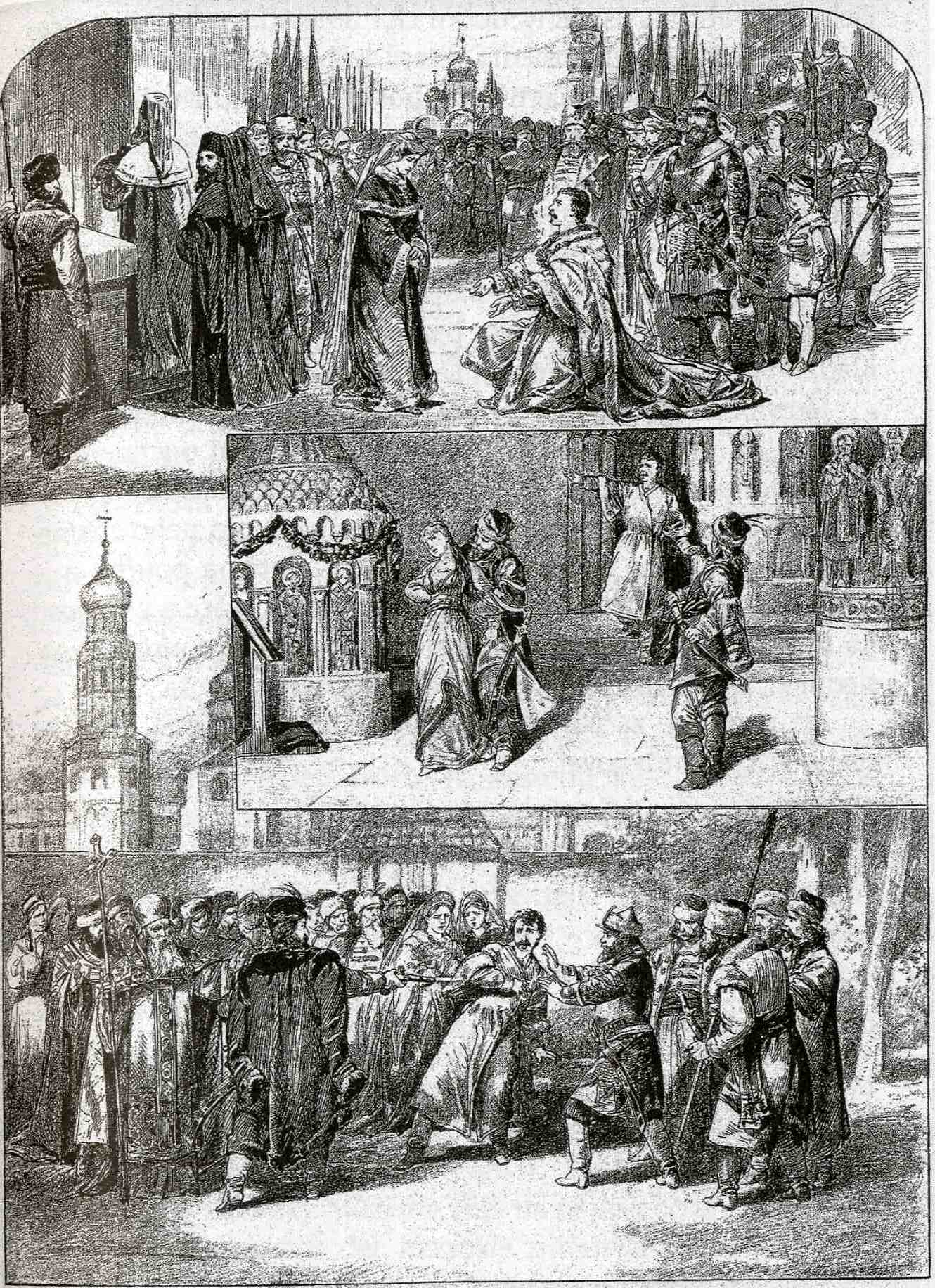
- Scenes from Dimitrij by Emil Zillich for the Světozor journal, 1883
- Librettist: Marie Červinková-Riegrová
- Language: Czech
- Based on: Ferdinand Mikovec's Dimitr Ivanovič
- Premiere: 8 October 1882; New Czech Theatre, Prague

Dimitrij is a Czech-language grand opera in four acts by Antonín Dvořák (Op. 64, B. 127), set to a libretto by Marie Červinková-Riegrová, with a plot derived from Ferdinand Mikovec's Dimitr Ivanovič, itself based upon Friedrich Schiller's incomplete Demetrius. The work was first performed in Prague in 1882.

== Composition and performance history ==
The libretto was originally written for Karel Šebor to set, but he proved highly unwilling to do so, so Červinková-Riegrová offered her work to Dvořák, who proved much more enthusiastic, but requested many modifications to the libretto as it stood, including the introduction of more opportunities for ensembles. The form of the opera was largely in imitation of Eugène Scribe. Dvořák began composition during May 1881, with an interruption in October 1881 to write a string quartet for the Hellmesberger Quartet. After an initial failed attempt, the Quartet Movement in F major, the String Quartet No. 11 was completed in November 1881, allowing work on the opera to resume.

The work was first performed in Prague, at the Nové české divadlo (New Czech Theatre) on October 8, 1882. The first performance in the United States was on March 24, 1984, in a concert format presented at Carnegie Hall in New York City by conductor Robert Bass and the Collegiate Chorale with Martina Arroyo as Marina.

With Dimitrij, Dvořák scored a great popular success, though he later persuaded his librettist to rework act 4, and this revised version was given in 1885. Later still, he heavily reworked the opera along Wagnerian lines, and this radical version was performed during 1892.

== Roles ==
Roles, voice types, premiere cats
Role	Voice type	Premiere cast, October 8, 1882 (Conductor: Mořic Anger)
Jov, the patriarch of Moscow	bass	Ferdinand Koubek
Prince Vasilij Šujský	baritone	Josef Lev
Petr Fedorovič Basmanov	bass	Frantisek Hynek
Xenie Borisovna	soprano	Irma Reichová
Dimitrij Ivanovič	tenor	Václav Soukup
Marfa Ivanovna	contralto	Eleonora Gayerová
Marina Mníškova, Dmitrij's wife	soprano	Marie Zofie Sittová
Něborský	baritone	J. Christl
Bučinský	baritone	Václav Mikoláš

== Synopsis ==
After the death of Boris, the Russian people are split between the followers of the Godunov family (led by Shuisky) whilst others (led by General Basmanov) support Dmitrij, assumed son of Ivan the Terrible and husband to the Polish Marina of the Sandomir family. If Marfa (widow of Ivan the Terrible) publicly recognises Dimitrij as her son, he will triumph. Despite knowing that this is not the case, she does this to use him as a pawn for her revenge on her old enemies.

In act 2, Dimitrij is seen breaking up altercations between Poles and Russians and rescuing Xenie, with whom he forms a relationship. He also breaks up a conspiracy led by Shuisky, who is to be executed.

In act 3, Xenie begs Dimitrij to have mercy on Shuisky. Marina realises the link between the two and reveals Dimitrij's humble origins, but he nevertheless intends to remain ruler.

Finally, in act 4, Xenie mourns her betrayed love. Marina, however, has Xenie killed and reveals Dimitrij's origins. Dimitrij is finally shot by Shuisky.

Recordings
Year	Cast Dimitrij Ivanovič, Prince Vasilij Šujský, Pyotr Basmanov, Xenie Borisovna, Marfa Ivanovna	Conductor, Opera house and Orchestra	Label
1951	Beno Blachut, Marta Krasova, Zdenka Hrncirova, Karel Kalaz, Marie Budikova	Karel Nedbar, Prague Radio Symphony Orchestra	CD: Classical Moments
1991	Leo Marian Vodička, Ivan Kusnjer, Lívia Ághová, Drahomíra Drobková	Gerd Albrecht, Czech Philharmonic Orchestra, Czech Philharmonic Chorus	CD: Supraphon Cat: 11 1259-2
