= Beno Blachut =

Czech operatic tenor (1913–1985)

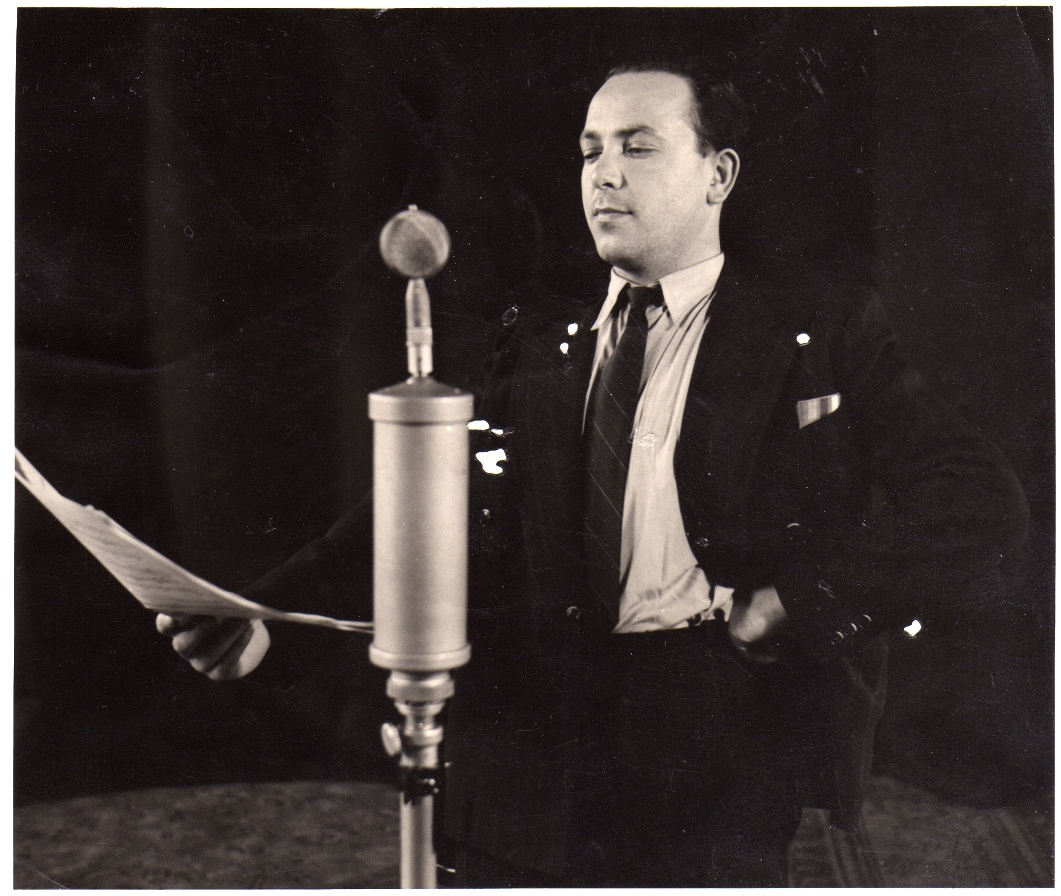

Beno Blachut (14 June 1913 – 10 January 1985) was a Czech operatic tenor. An icon in his own nation, Blachut drew international acclaim through his many commercial recordings of Czech music. He was an instrumental part of the post-World War II school of Czech opera singers that were responsible for popularizing Czech opera internationally. He was highly regarded for his interpretations of roles in operas by Leoš Janáček, Antonín Dvořák, and Bedřich Smetana.

== Biography ==
Born in Ostrava-Vítkovice, Blachut grew up in a poor family of miners. Blachut was highly involved in his church's music program which provided him with his initial musical training as a child and teenager. In 1927, at the age of 14, he began working at an iron factory and from all appearances it seemed he was destined to live a life similar to that of his parents. In the year 1935 he started to study singing at the Prague conservatory.

At the conservatory, Blachut studied under Luis Kadeřábek for four years. He made his professional opera debut at the Olomouc Opera in the role of Jeník in Smetana's The Bartered Bride on 25 December 1938. He sang at the house for the next two years, portraying eighteen different roles (for example: Faust, Canio in Pagliacci, Laca in Jenůfa, Prince in Rusalka) under the direction of Karel Nedbal. In 1941 he left Olomouc to join the roster of principal tenors at the Czech National Opera in Prague, singing Jenik again for his first appearance at that house.

Up to this point, Blachut had mostly portrayed lyric tenor parts, but in Prague he began to sing works from the dramatic repertoire, especially in operas by Janáček, Dvořák, and Smetana. On 3 February 1942 he starred in the world premiere of František Škroup's Columbus (composed in 1855). Outside the Czech repertoire, he sang Alfredo in La traviata, Cavaradossi in Tosca, Don José in Carmen, Ferrando in Così fan tutte, Florestan in Fidelio, Hermann in The Queen of Spades, Lensky in Eugene Onegin, Pierre Bezukhov in War and Peace, Radames in Aida, Walther in Die Meistersinger von Nürnberg, and the title roles in Faust and Otello among other roles.

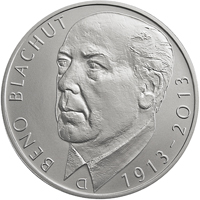
Czech 500 korun coin commemorating the 100th anniversary of Blachut's birth, 2013.

By 1945 Blachut's performance credits had grown to include almost all of the major tenor parts from the Czech repertory. At this point he was widely view as Czechoslovakia's leading tenor and he appeared on tour with the Czech National Opera in opera performances in Austria, Belgium, Germany, Hungary, Poland, and Russia. He also appeared with the company in England at the 1964 Edinburgh Festival in an acclaimed portrayal of Luka Kuzmič in Janáček's From the House of the Dead. He returned to Edinburgh for another lauded performance in 1970 as Matěj Brouček in The Excursions of Mr. Brouček. That same year he sang in the world premiere of Jiří Pauer's Zdravý nemocný in Prague after Le malade imaginaire by Molière. Blachut was also highly regarded internationally for his portrayal of the title role in Smetana's Dalibor.

In addition to his performances with the Prague Opera, Blachut also occasionally worked as freelance artist, notably making guest appearances at La Fenice, Deutsche Oper Berlin, De Nederlandse Opera, the Finnish National Opera, and the Vienna State Opera. In 1959 he appeared at the Holland Festival as Boris in Káťa Kabanová. Blachut was also active as a concert singer, appearing in productions like Dvořák's Stabat Mater and Janáček's Glagolitic Mass. He was particularly known for his interpretation of Janáček's The Diary of One Who Disappeared and his recording of that work is considered by many critics to be the remaining definitive interpretation.

He died in Prague at the age of 71. He is buried at the Vyšehrad cemetery next to Antonín Dvořák. In 2001 was founded in Prague The Beno Blachut Society (Společnost Beno Blachuta) producing historical recordings of Blachut and his artistic colleagues.

== Recordings ==
=== Opera recordings ===
Year	Title	Role	Conductor and Ensemble	Label
1942	František Škroup's Columbus		Frantisek Dyk (conductor); Prague Radio Symphony Orchestra and Chorus	Multisonic Records
1946	Antonín Dvořák: Dimitrij	Dimitrij	Prague Radio Symphony Orchestra and Chorus	
1947	Bedřich Smetana: The Bartered Bride	Vašek	Karel Ančerl (conductor); Prague Radio Symphony Orchestra and Chorus	Opera d'Oro
1950	Bedřich Smetana: Dalibor	Dalibor	Jaroslav Krombholc (conductor); Prague National Theatre Chorus and Orchestra	LP: Supraphon
1955	Antonín Dvořák: Rusalka	The prince	Jaroslav Krombholc (conductor); Prague National Theatre Chorus and Orchestra	LP: Supraphon
1956	Leoš Janáček: Jenůfa	Laca Klemeň	Jaroslav Vogel (conductor); Prague National Theatre Chorus and Orchestra	LP: Supraphon
1956	Bedřich Smetana: The Kiss	Lukáš	Zdeněk Chalabala (conductor); Prague National Theatre Chorus and Orchestra	LP: Supraphon
1959	Leoš Janáček: The Makropulos Case	Albert Gregor	Jaroslav Vogel (conductor); Prague National Theatre Chorus and Orchestra	LP: Supraphon
1960	Leoš Janáček:Káťa Kabanová	Boris Grigorjevic	Jaroslav Krombholc (conductor); Prague National Theatre Chorus and Orchestra	LP: Supraphon
1964	Leoš Janáček:From the House of the Dead	Luka Kuzmič	Bohumil Gregor (conductor); Prague National Theatre Chorus and Orchestra	LP: Supraphon (won the Grand Prix du disque lyrique in 1978)
1978	Antonín Dvořák: The Jacobin	Benda	Jiri Pinkas (conductor); Prague National Theatre Chorus and Orchestra	LP: Supraphon
	Antonín Dvořák: Vanda		František Dyk (conductor); Prague Radio Chorus and Orchestra	

=== Choral and symphonic recordings ===
Year	Title	Genre	Collaborators	Label
1956	Leoš Janáček: The Diary of One Who Disappeared	Song cycle	Jan Kühn (conductor); Josef Páleníček (piano); Štěpánka Štěpánová (contralto); Czech Singers' Chamber Female Chorus	LP:Supraphon
1961	Antonín Dvořák: The Spectre's Bride	Dramatic cantata	Jaroslav Krombholc (conductor); Czech Philharmonic Orchestra and Chorus	LP:Supraphon
1963	Leoš Janáček: Glagolitic Mass	Mass	Karel Ančerl (conductor); Czech Philharmonic Orchestra and Chorus	LP:Supraphon
1964	Antonín Dvořák: Saint Ludmila	Oratorio	Vaclav Smetacek (conductor); Prague Symphony Orchestra	LP:Supraphon
1966	Jakub Jan Ryba:Czech Christmas Mass	Mass	Vaclav Smetacek (conductor); Prague Symphony Orchestra	LP:Supraphon
1997	Leoš Janáček: The Eternal Gospel	Cantata	Jiri Pinkas (conductor); Prague Symphony Orchestra and Chorus	CD:Supraphon (released posthumously)

=== Other recordings ===
Year	Title	Genre	Collaborators	Label
1995	Antonín Dvořák: Biblical Songs, Op 99, Gypsy Songs, Op. 55, Evening Songs, Op. 3, Love Songs, Op. 83	Song cycles	Věra Soukupová (contralto); Jindřich Jirák (baritone); Ivan Moravec, Alfred Holeček, Ferdinand Pohlreich (pianos)	CD:Supraphon (released posthumously)
