= Berta Foersterová =

Czech operatic soprano

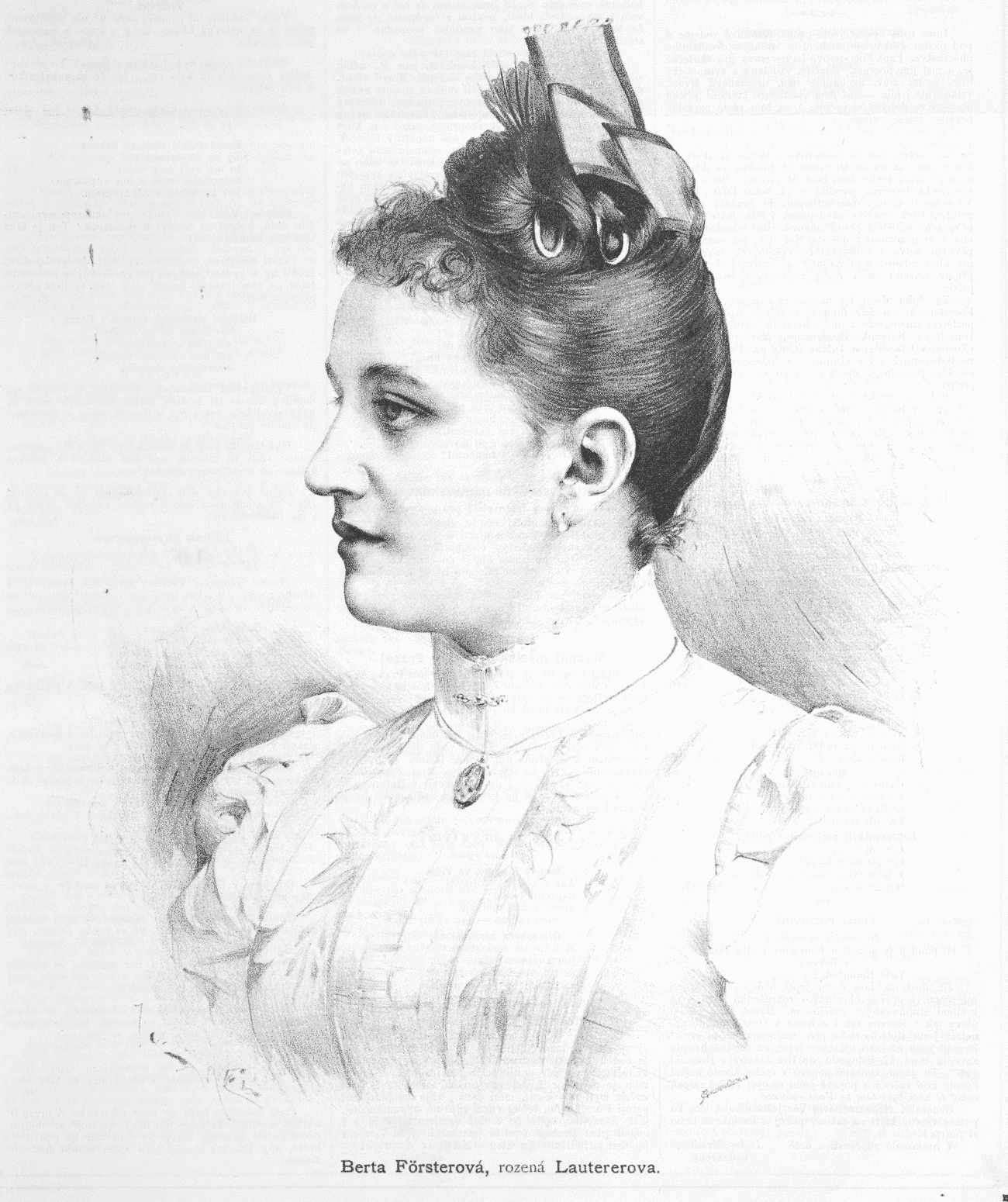
- Berta Foersterová

Background information
- Birth name: Berta Lautererová
- Also known as: Bertha Laurer
- Born: 11 January 1869; Prague, Austria-Hungary
- Died: 9 April 1936 (aged 67); Prague, Czechoslovakia
- Genres: Opera
- Occupation: Singer
- Instrument: Vocals

Berta Foersterová (née Lautererová, sometimes styled Bertha Laurer or Berta Foersterová-Lautererová; 11 January 1869 – 9 April 1936) was a Czech operatic soprano. She was active in Germany.

== Biography ==
The wife of composer Josef Bohuslav Foerster, she met him while appearing at the Hamburg State Opera. She created the role of Desdemona in the Czech premiere of Giuseppe Verdi's Otello, and sang Tatiana in the Czech premiere of Pyotr Ilyich Tchaikovsky's Eugene Onegin; she also appeared in the world premiere of Antonín Dvořák's The Jacobin.
