= Leo Marian Vodička =

Czech operatic tenor (born 1950)

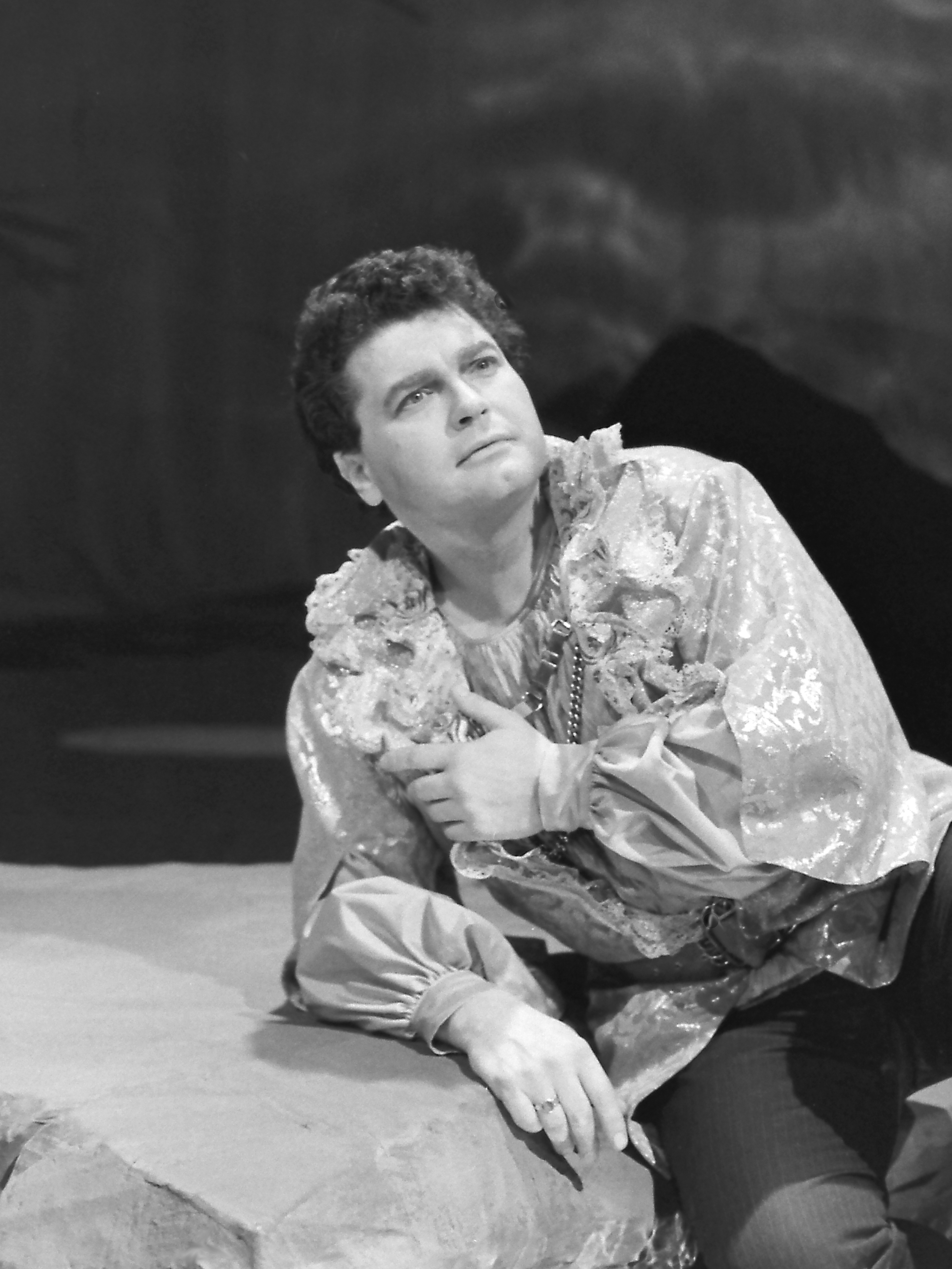
Image of Leo Marian Vodička

Leo Marian Vodička (born 8 April 1950) is a Czech operatic tenor who has had an active international career since the early 1970s. He has sung on a number of complete opera recordings and appears in several filmed opera performances.

Born in Brno, Vodička studied singing at the Janáček Academy of Music and Performing Arts in his native city. He made his professional opera debut in 1971 at the Jihočeské divadlo in České Budějovice as Lukáš in Bedřich Smetana's The Kiss. He remained at that opera house for one year, after which he was committed to the Moravské divadlo in Olomouc from 1972 to 1979. He sang at the Brno National Theatre from 1979 to 1982. From 1982 to 1987, he was a member of the Prague National Theatre. He returned to Brno from 1987 to 1992.

Since 1992 Vodička has worked as a freelance artist without a permanent engagement. He made his debut at the Vienna State Opera in 1990 as the Prince in Antonín Dvořák's Rusalka and his first appearance at the Edinburgh Festival in 1998 in the title role of Smetana's Dalibor. He has also made guest appearances at the National Opera and Ballet (Sofia), the Prague State Opera, the Zurich Opera, and opera houses in France, Germany, and Italy.

Among the many roles Vodička has performed on stage are Alfredo in La Traviata, Calàf in Turandot, Cavaradossi in Tosca, Dick Johnson in La fanciulla del West, Don José in Carmen, Jenik in The Bartered Bride, Laca in Jenůfa, Manrico in Il trovatore, Radames in Aida, Rodolfo in La bohème, Sťáhlav in Bedřich Smetana's Libuše, Turiddu in Cavalleria rusticana, Walther in Die Meistersinger von Nürnberg, and the title roles in Dimitrij, Don Carlos, Faust and Otello among other roles.
