= The Spectre's Bride =

Czech opera

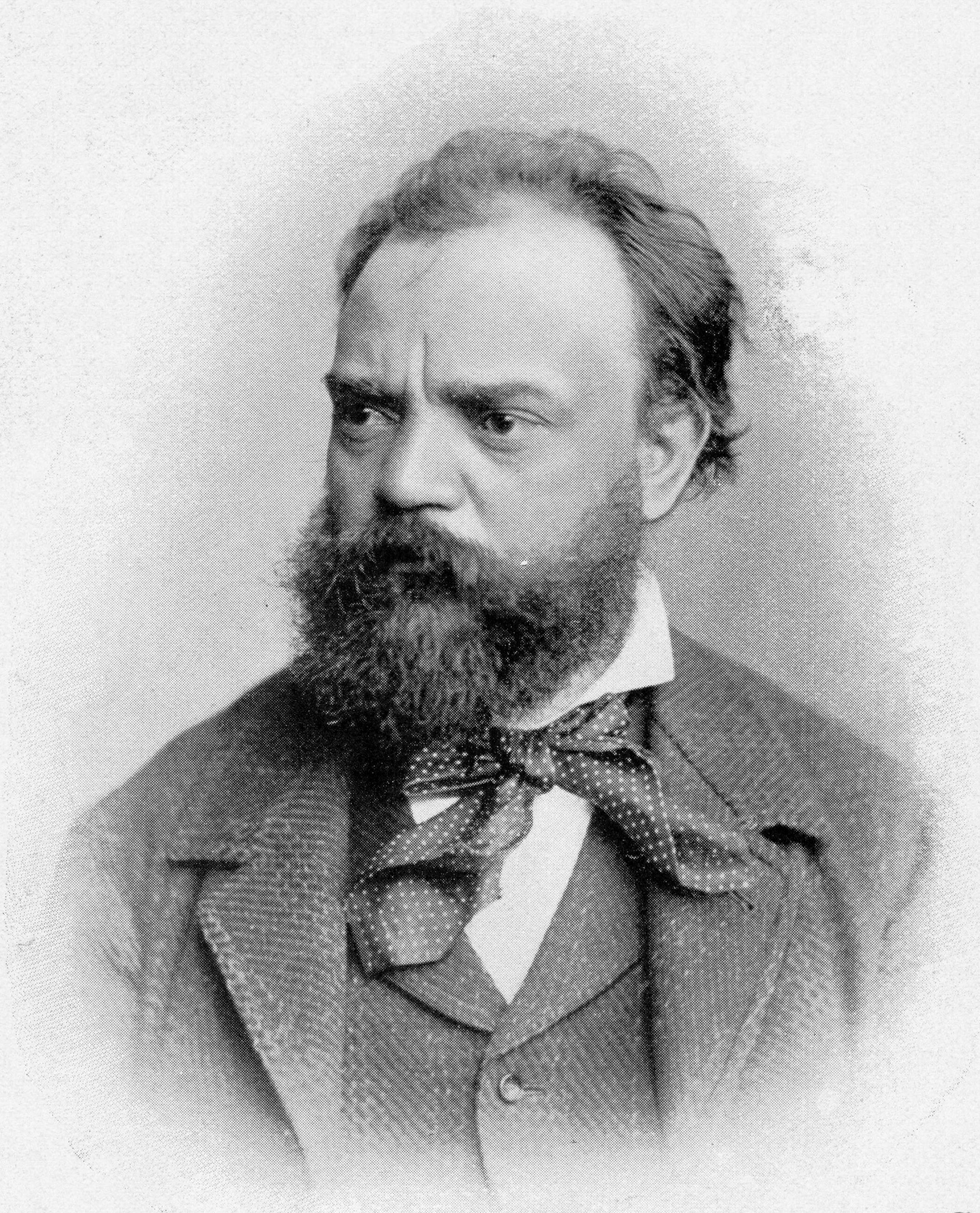
Antonín Dvořák in 1882

The Spectre's Bride (Czech: Svatební košile; literally "The Wedding Shirt") is a cantata for soloists, choir and orchestra Op. 69 by Antonín Dvořák based on a literary model by Karel Jaromír Erben (1884).

== Background ==
In 1883, Dvořák was invited to write a large orchestral oratorio for England to be performed at the Birmingham Triennial Music Festival. Dvořák had agreed with his librettist Marie Červinková-Riegrová to write an oratorio on a theme from Czech history, for example the story of St. Wenceslaus or Jan Hus. Finally he decided to write a literary work, the ballad The Spectre's Bride by Karel Jaromír Erben. He worked on his composition from April to November 1884, and the cantata was published by Alfred Novello the following year.

Before the performance in England, the cantata was first presented twice on 28 and 29 March 1885 in Plzeň under the composer's direction. The success of the performances at the Birmingham Triennial Music Festival on 27 August this year – involving a 400-strong choir, a 150-strong orchestra and with Dvořák on the conductor's podium – exceeded all the composer's expectations. The work was already heard in Milwaukee on 2 December 1885, in Edinburgh on 1 February 1886, in London on 2 February 1886, in Glasgow on 11 and 13 February 1886 and in London on 13 February 1886. In March 1886, Brooklyn followed, on 23 March 1886 Dewsbury, on 24 March 1886 Leeds, on 17 April 1886 Hradec Králové, on 6 May 1886 Chicago, on 10 May 1886 Philadelphia, 13 May 1886 in Boston, etc.

== Structure ==
- Introduction
- Nr. 1. Choir: "Už jedenáctá odbila"
- Nr. 2. Soprano solo: "Žel bohu, žel, kde můj tatíček?"
- Nr. 3. Tenor and bass solo and Choir: "Pohnul se obraz na stěně"
- Nr. 4. Duett. Soprano and tenor solo: "Hoj, má panenko, tu jsem již!"
- Nr. 5. Bass solo and Choir: "Byla noc, byla hluboká"
- Nr. 6. Bass solo and Choir: "A on tu napřed skok a skok"
- Nr. 7. Duett. soprano and tenor solo: "Pěkná noc, jasná"
- Nr. 8. Bass solo and Choir: "Knížky ji vzal a zahodil"
- Nr. 9. Bass solo and Choir: "A on vždy napřed – skok a skok"
- Nr. 10. Duett. soprano and tenor solo: "Pěkná noc, jasná, v tento čas"
- Nr. 11. Bass solo and Choir: "A byla cesta nížinou"
- Nr. 12. Duett. Soprano and tenor solo: "Pěkná noc, jasná, v tu dobu"
- Nr. 13. Bass solo and Choir: "Tu na planině široké"
- Nr. 14. Duett. Soprano and tenor solo: "Hoj, má panenko, tu jsme již"
- Nr. 15. Bass solo and Choir: "Skokem přeskočil ohradu"
- Nr. 16. Bass solo and Choir: "A tu na dveře: buch, buch, buch!"
- Nr. 17. Sopran solo: "Maria Panno, při mně stůj"
- Nr. 18. Bass solo and Choir: '"A slyš, tu právě nablízce'"

== Instrumentation ==
It is scored for piccolo, two flutes, two oboes, English horn, three clarinets, two bassoons, four horns, two trumpets, three trombones, tuba, timpani, triangle, tam-tam, bells, harp, first and second violins, violas, cellos, double basses + mixed choir + vocal soloists (soprano, tenor, bass)

== Synopsis ==
A young girl kneels in prayer, lamenting the deaths of her father, mother, sister and brother; and the absence of her departed true love. Before going away, he had told her in the first year to sow flax; in the second to spin it into linen; and in the third to make it into wedding shirts for them both. This she does; then one night he returns, urging her to come away with him before daybreak. This she does; and as they travel across rough country, he persuades her to throw away in turn her missal, her rosary and her crucifix. Finally they arrive at what he calls his house, but which she sees to be a church. He bids her throw her linen away, but when he leaps over the wall and looks behind him, there is no-one there.

The narration's perspective now shifts to that of the man, lying dead on a bier in his tomb. Three times spirits of the dead rap at the door, trying to persuade him to join them; two times they are repelled by the prayers of someone unseen; but the third prayer fails, and the spirits are only driven away by cockcrow.

Townsfolk arriving to hear mass find the girl in an open crypt, with the wedding shirts scattered around on all the graves. Erben doesn’t say whether she is alive or dead but the narrator remarks that without her prayers, she would have suffered a terrible death: her body torn like the shreds of wedding shirts.
