= Irma Reichová =

Czech operatic soprano (1859–1930)

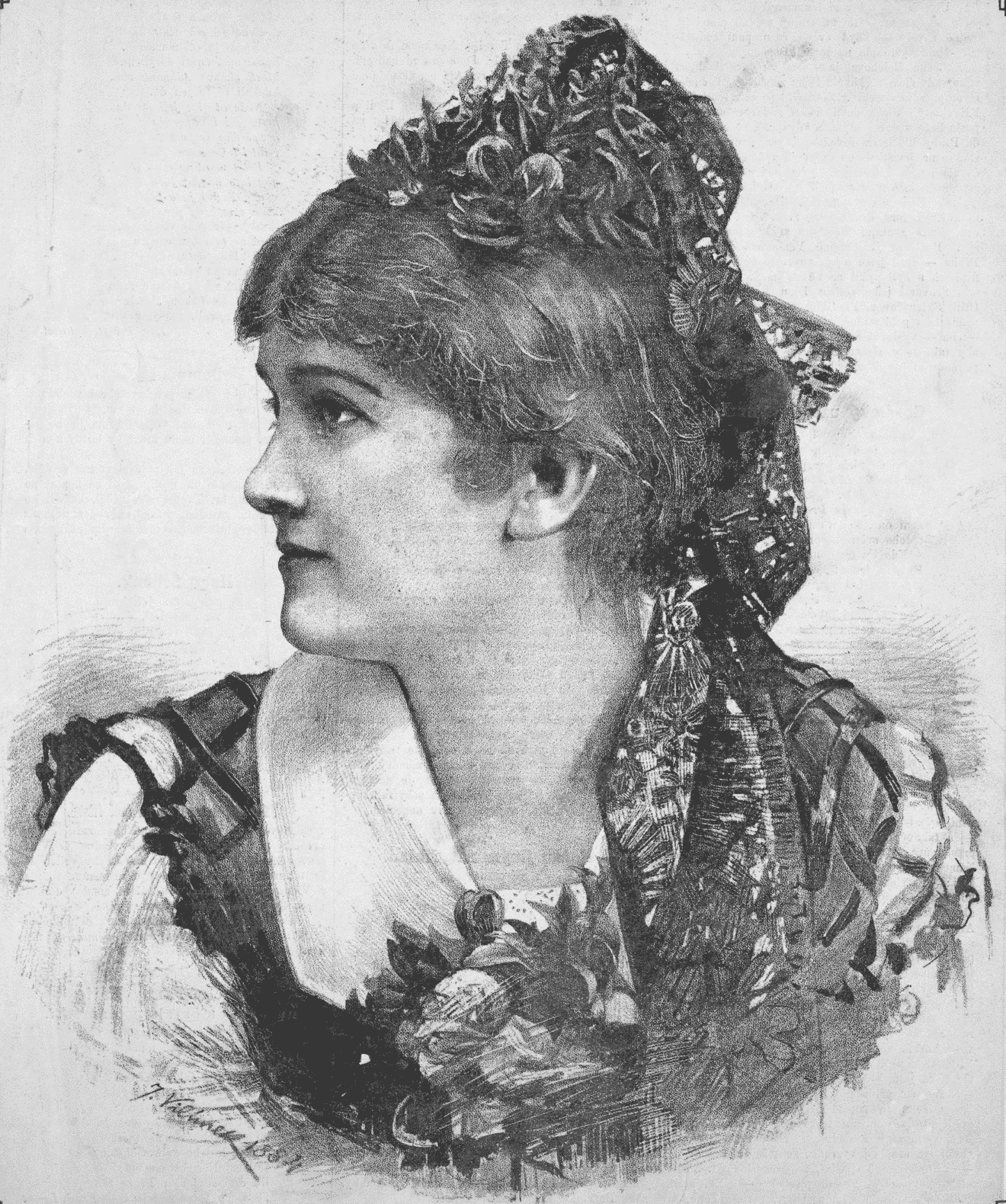
1884 portrait of Reichová

Irma Reichová (14 March 1859 – 5 June 1930) was a Czech operatic soprano who had an active career appearing in European opera houses during the latter half of the nineteenth century. A dramatic soprano, she was admired for both her musical and acting talent. She is best remembered for appearing in the world premieres of a number of operas by Antonín Dvořák and Bedřich Smetana.

== Biography ==
Born Irma Keszlerová in Křivoklát, Reichová first sang publicly in 1874 at a festival honoring the building of a railway bridge near his hometown. Her local priest, Václav Štulc, together with Prince Emil Furstenberg, were so amazed by her voice that they advised her parents to enroll her in singing lessons. Her family accordingly sent her to Prague where she studied under František Pivoda, the Director of the Prague School of Singing.

She made her first public appearance in Prague as Senta in a concert version of Richard Wagner's Der fliegende Holländer. Shortly thereafter she was supposed to appear at the opera house in Teplice, but ill health prevented her from performing. She finally made her first staged opera appearance at the Provisional Theatre the following year. Her portrayal of Marguerita in Charles Gounod's Faust was so well received that the theatre's manager, Johann Nepomuk Maýr, offered her a long-term contract. She accepted and appeared in a number of operettas over the next year.

In 1881, Bedřich Smetana invited Reichová to join his roster of artists at the then new Prague National Theatre. She accepted the offer, breaking her contract with the Provisional Theatre. She notably sang at the grand opening of the National Theatre on June 11, 1881 as the title heroine in the world premiere of Smetana's Libuše; a performance given in honor of the visit of Crown Prince Rudolf of Austria. Unfortunately the new house was destroyed two months later by a fire and the company had to perform at the Nové České Divadlo (New Czech Theatre) until the theatre could be rebuilt. At the New Czech Theatre, Reichová notably portrayed Hedvika in the first production of Smetana's The Devil's Wall on October 29, 1882 and Xenie Borisovna in the world premiere of Antonín Dvořák's Dimitrij on 8 October 1882. The National Theatre reopened on November 18, 1883 with a reprisal of Libuše with the same cast.

In 1887, Reichová's love for Italian music brought her to Italy where she became fluent in Italian and made intensive studies of the major Italian repertoire. In 1888, she appeared at the Hungarian State Opera House, where she raised such enthusiasm that she was offered a permanent contract. She spent the next seven years as Budapest's leading soprano.

In 1891, Reichová returned to Prague where she continued to sing and worked as a voice teacher. In 1927, she retired and lived the rest of her life in Bohemia. She died in Prague on 5 June 1930, aged 71.
