= Josef Wenzig =

Czech writer and librettist

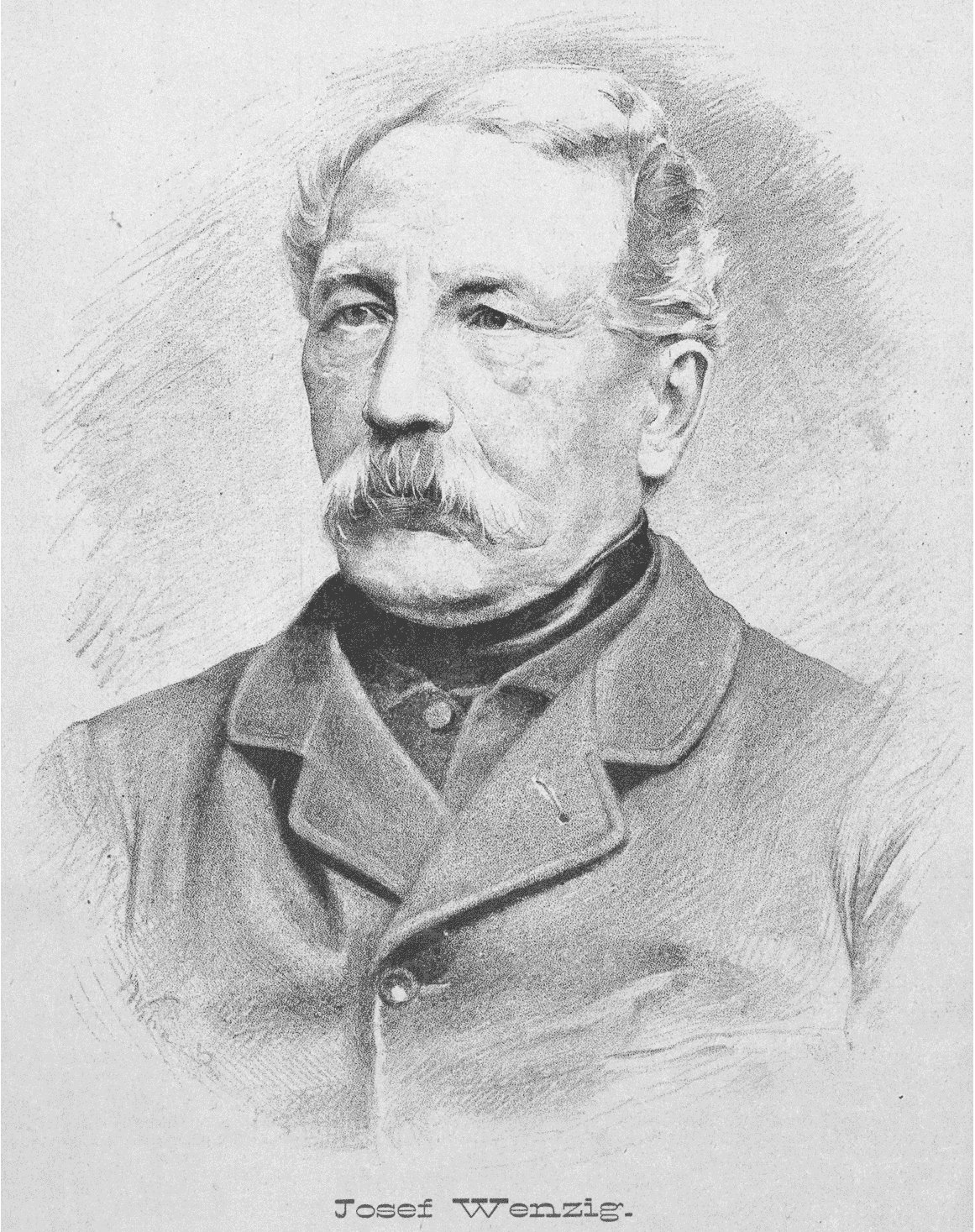
Josef Wenzig, drawing by Jan Vilímek

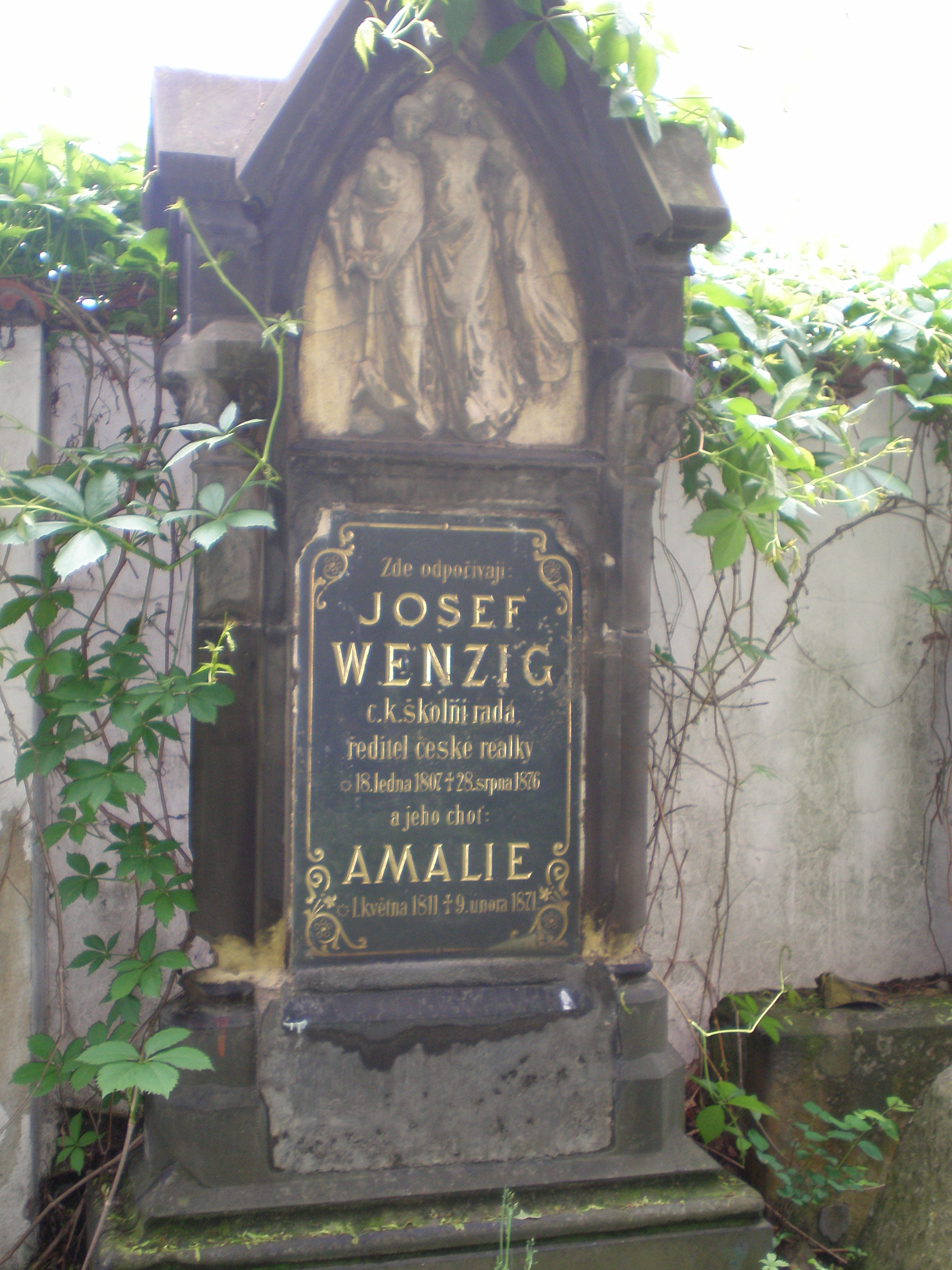
Wenzig's grave in Prague

Josef Wenzig (18 January 1807 – 28 August 1876) was a Czech writer and author of librettos.

== Life ==
Born in Prague, Bohemia, Austrian Empire, Wenzig was an educator in noble families, rector of the Czech real school in Prague and from 1833, professor of German language and geography. During his teaching he also contributed to the equalisation of the Czech language with German in schools (Wenzig law). He was the director of the Artists' Association (Umělecká beseda) where he met Bedřich Smetana.

Wenzig died in Turnov, aged 69 and was buried at the Olšany Cemetery.

== Work ==
Wenzig tried his hand as a writer and wrote a play that was positively reviewed by Jan Neruda. However, as a playwright he was insignificant for his time. Better known are his librettos, which he first wrote in German and then had translated into Czech, Dalibor and Libuše, both set to music by Smetana. Many of his poems were set to music by Johannes Brahms.

He also translated Czech and Slovak lieder, poems, fairy tales and sagas into German – including the book of Slovak folk tales Westslawischer Märchenschatz, which was filmed several times.
