= Marie Červinková-Riegrová =

Czech writer and librettist (1854–1895)

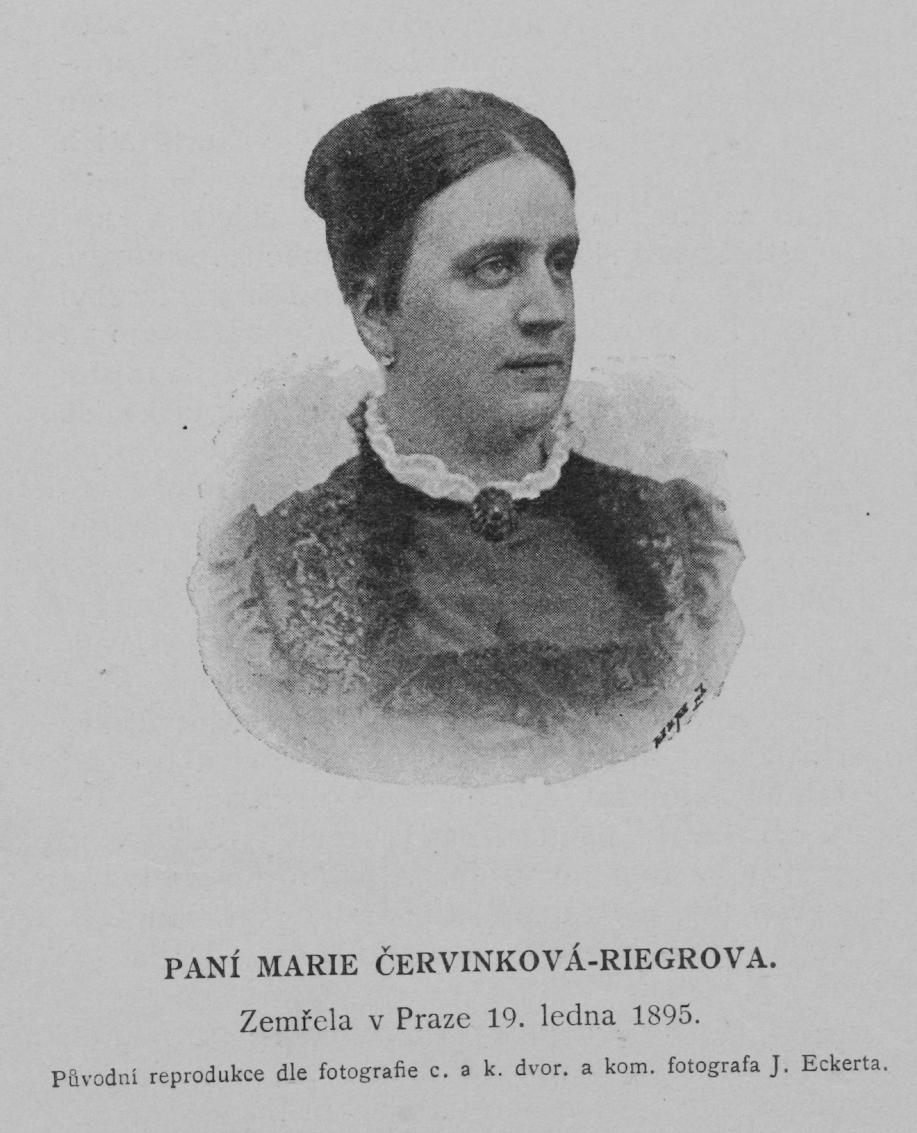
Marie Červinková-Riegrová

Marie Červinková-Riegrová (9 August 1854 in Prague – 19 January 1895 in Prague) was a Czech writer.

She wrote the libretto Dimitrij for Karel Šebor, but then offered it to Antonín Dvořák, who set it to music in 1881.
