= Gerd Albrecht =

German conductor (1935–2014)

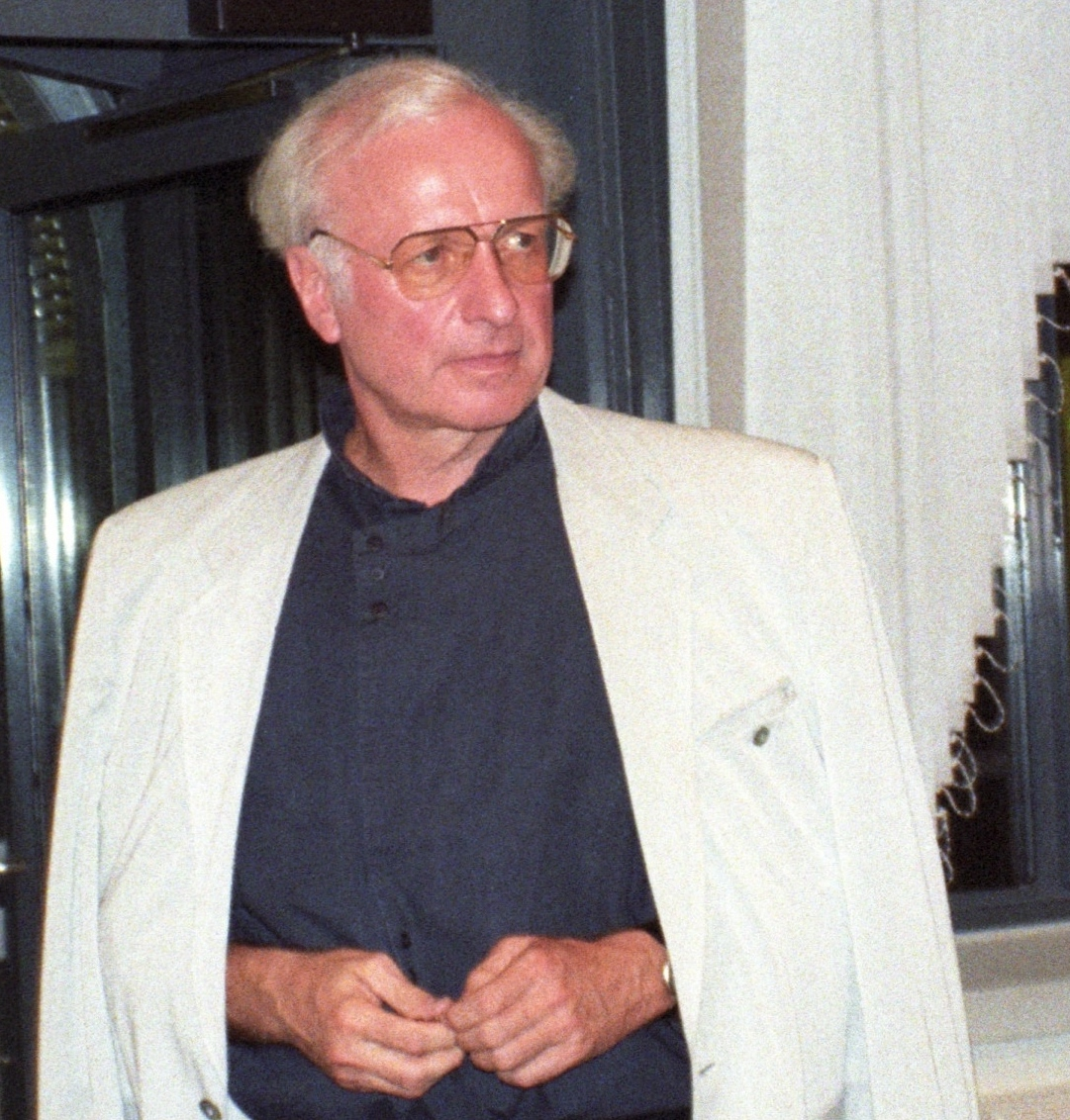
- Born: 19 July 1935; Essen, Germany
- Died: 2 February 2014 (aged 78); Berlin. Germany
- Occupation: conductor
- Website: gerd-albrecht.com

Gerd Albrecht (19 July 1935 – 2 February 2014) was a German conductor.

== Biography ==
Albrecht was born in Essen, the son of the musicologist Hans Albrecht (1902–1961). He studied music in Kiel and in Hamburg, where his teachers included Wilhelm Brückner-Rüggeberg. He was a first-prize winner at the International Besançon Competition for Young Conductors at age 22. His first post was as a repetiteur at the Stuttgart State Opera. Later, he became Senior Kapellmeister at the Staatstheater Mainz, and Generalmusikdirektor in Lübeck. He also held posts at the Deutsche Oper Berlin, the Tonhalle-Orchester Zürich and the Hamburg State Opera.

His work in contemporary opera included conducting Aribert Reimann's Lear in both its world premiere and its United States premiere, as well as making the first commercial recording of the opera. His other commercial recordings include Robert Schumann's Genoveva and Manfred, and the first commercial recording of Hans Werner Henze's Gogo no Eiko (The Sailor Who Fell from Grace with the Sea) in its revised Japanese-language version.

Albrecht died at age 78 on 2 February 2014 in Berlin.

=== Czech Philharmonic controversy ===
In 1991, the musicians of the Czech Philharmonic picked Albrecht as its principal conductor, the first non-Czech conductor named to the post, for a tenure scheduled to last seven years beginning in 1994. The orchestra had played a part in protesting the Soviet domination of their country and reorganized as a self-governing entity. The musician's selection of Albrecht effectively meant the replacing of Czech conductor Jiří Bělohlávek, who then in 1992 resigned from his position early. Consequently, by the time that he took up the post, the orchestra was already somewhat riven. Albrecht proved effective in improving the Czech Philharmonic's finances and at raising its international profile with foreign tours. He is also acknowledged to have been a musical success, and his recordings with the orchestra included music of Ervin Schulhoff. However, a series of political conflicts led to his early resignation.

In 1994, the Czech Philharmonic was invited to perform at the Vatican in a concert celebrating reconciliation between Roman Catholics and Jews. However, the invitation was to play under the American conductor Gilbert Levine, already known for his close relationship with the Vatican under Pope John Paul II and subsequently for the telecast, Papal Concert to Commemorate the Holocaust. Albrecht vetoed the engagement, ostensibly because the orchestra was too busy, although other speculation on the actual reason for the refusal was that the Vatican did not invite Albrecht.

Czech president Václav Havel became involved, telling Albrecht that his actions were damaging the orchestra. The situation steadily deteriorated, with Albrecht painting himself in press interviews as a victim of racism and anti-German feeling and for being expected personally to atone for all past German misdeeds. He also claimed that his phone was bugged. Havel retaliated in the media with his own claims. Albrecht and Bělohlávek collaborated for the 100th anniversary concert, each conducting half of it, on January 4, 1996, but Havel was conspicuously absent and members of the orchestra showed their allegiances when the time came for applause. Albrecht resigned from this post a month later asserting that his musical authority had been undermined.

With the Czech Philharmonic, Albrecht conducted the first commercial recording of Dvořák's opera Dimitrij.

=== Other conducting work ===
From 2000 to 2004, he was principal conductor of the Danish National Symphony Orchestra, with which he made commercial recordings for such labels as Chandos. In 2003, he caused controversy when he spoke from the podium at one concert to protest the US invasion of Iraq. He later apologized for the incident. In Japan, he served as principal conductor of Yomiuri Nippon Symphony Orchestra from 1998 to 2007, and became its conductor laureate after 2007.

=== Recordings of complete operas ===
- Berlioz, Les troyens, Albrecht/Dernesch/Ludwig/Lilowa/Chauvet/Schöne/Ghiuselev, 1976, live in Vienna, Gala
- Busoni, Arlecchino, Albrecht/Bellamy/Wörle/Lorenz/Pape/Lika, 1992, Capriccio
- Busoni, Turandot, Albrecht/Plech/Schreckenbach/Protschka/Pape, 1992, Capriccio
- Dvořák, Armida, Albrecht/Borowska/Ochman/Kříž/Fortune/Daniluk, 1995, live in Prague, Orfeo
- Dvořák, The Devil and Kate (Čert a Káča), Albrecht/Romanko/Breedt/Straka/Mikuláš, 2007, Orfeo
- Dvořák, Dimitrij, Albrecht/Hajóssyová/Ághová/Vodička/Kusnjer/Mikuláš, 1989, Supraphon
- Dvořák, Jakobín, Albrecht/Danková/Ághová/Lorenz/Lehotsky/Bronikowski/Stephinger, 2003, Orfeo
- Dvořák, King and Collier (Král a uhlíř), Albrecht/Ághová/Breedt/Lehotsky/Schäfer/Jenis/Mikuláš, 2005, live in Cologne, Orfeo
- Dvořák, Svatební košile, Albrecht/Ághová/Protschka/Kusnjer, 1991, live in Hamburg, Orfeo
- Dvořák, Vanda, Albrecht/Romanko/Tchistiakova/Breedt/Straka/Kusnjer/Kusnjer/Daniluk, 1999, Orfeo
- Gurlitt, Soldaten, Albrecht/Müller/Barainsky/Breedt/Harper/Mohr/Burt, 1998, Orfeo
- Gurlitt, Wozzeck, Albrecht/Lindsley/Wottrich/Wörle/Scharinger/Hermann, 1993, Crystal
- Halévy, La Juive, Albrecht/Ghazarian/Tokody/Carreras/Merritt/Siepi, 1981, live in Vienna, abridged, Legato
- Henze, The Bassarids, Albrecht/Lindsley/Armstrong/Riegel/Tear/Schmidt-A/Murray-W/Burt, 1986, Koch
- Henze, Das verratene Meer (Gogo no Eiko), Albrecht/Midorikawa/Takahashi/Mihara, 2006, live in Salzburg, Orfeo
- Hindemith, Cardillac, Albrecht/Schweizer/Schunk/Nimsgern/Stamm, 1988, Wergo
- Hindemith, Mathis der Maler, Albrecht/Rossmanith/Hass/Protschka/Kruse/Hermann/Stamm, 1989, Wergo
- Hindemith, Mörder, Hoffnung der Frauen, Albrecht/Schnaut/Grundheber, 1986, Wergo
- Hindemith, Das Nusch-Nuschi, Albrecht/Schweizer/Lindsley/Sieber/Schreckenbach/Gahmlich/Knutson/Stamm/Halem, 1987, Wergo
- Hindemith, Sancta Susanna, Albrecht/Donath/Schnaut/Schreckenbach, 1984, Wergo
- Janáček, Osud, Albrecht/Ághová/Straka, 1995, live in Prague, Orfeo
- Krenek, Karl V, Albrecht/Jurinac/Ciesinski-Kr/Schwarz/Moser-T/Melchert/Schreier/Adam, 1980, live in Salzburg, Philips
- Liebermann, Freispruch für Medea, Albrecht/Pollet/Spingler/Kowalski/Haugland/Mist, 1995, live in Hamburg, Musiques Suisses
- Marschner, Hans Heiling, Albrecht/Zeumer/Schröder-Feinen/Gilles/Siukola/Weikl, 1972, live in Torino, Voce
- Massenet, Thérèse, Albrecht/Baltsa/Araiza/Fortune, 1981, live in Rome, Orfeo
- Mercadante, Il giuramento, Albrecht/Bernard/Baltsa/Carreras/Kerns, 1974, live in Berlin, House of Opera
- Mercadante, Il giuramento, Albrecht/Zampieri/Baltsa/Domingo/Kerns, 1979, live in Vienna, Orfeo
- Meyerbeer, L'africaine, Albrecht/Brunner/Arroyo/Lamberti/Milnes, 1977, live in Munich, Myto
- Puccini, Gianni Schicchi, Albrecht/Ghazarian/Lilowa/Ramiro/Berry, 1979, live in Vienna, Orfeo
- Puccini, Gianni Schicchi, Albrecht/Rossmanith/Dernesch/Ombuena Valls/Duesing, 1995, DVD, Hamburg, Encore
- Puccini, Suor Angelica, Albrecht/Lorengar/Meyer, 1979, live in Vienna, Bella Voce
- Puccini, Suor Angelica, Albrecht/Gallardo-Domâs/Dernesch, 1995, DVD, Hamburg, Encore
- Puccini, Il tabarro, Albrecht/Zschau/Atlantov/Bruson, 1979, live in Vienna, Bella Voce
- Puccini, Il tabarro, Albrecht/Daniels/Margison/Grundheber, 1995, DVD, Hamburg, Encore
- Reimann, Lear, Albrecht/Varady/Dernesch/Lorand/Knutson/Götz/Holm/Boysen/Fischer-Dieskau/Plöcker, 1978, live in Munich, DG
- Schnittke, Historia von D. Johann Fausten, Albrecht/Schwarz/Raunig/Büchner/Lorenz/Freier, 1995, live in Hamburg, RCA
- Schoeck, Penthesilea, Albrecht/Gessendorf/Marsh/Dernesch/Lipovšek/Hiestermann/Adam, 1982, live in Salzburg, Orfeo
- Schönberg, Erwartung, Albrecht/Nielsen, 2003, Chandos
- Schreker, Der ferne Klang, Albrecht/Schnaut/Juon/Wörle/Moser-T/Hermann/Nimsgern, 1990, Capriccio
- Schreker, Die Gezeichneten, Albrecht/Martin-Ja/Riegel/Becht/Adam/Meven, 1984, live in Salzburg, Orfeo
- Schreker, Der Schatzgräber, Albrecht/Schnaut/Kruse/Protschka/Haage/Helm/Stamm, 1989, live in Hamburg, abridged, Capriccio
- Schumann, Genoveva, Albrecht/Faulkner/Behle-R/Lewis-K/Stamm/Titus/Schultz, 1992, live in Hamburg, Orfeo
- Spohr, Jessonda, Albrecht/Studer/Soffel/Moser-T/Hermann/Hölle, 1985, live in Vienna, Voce
- Spohr, Jessonda, Albrecht/Varady/Behle-R/Moser-T/Fischer-Dieskau/Moll, 1990, live in Hamburg, abridged, Orfeo
- Spontini, Olimpie, Albrecht/Varady/Toczyska/Tagliavini/Fischer-Dieskau/Fortune, 1984, Orfeo
- Ullmann, Der zerbrochene Krug, Albrecht/Barainsky/Breedt/Künzli/Hermann, 1997, Orfeo
- Wolf, Der Corregidor, Albrecht/Donath/Soffel/Hollweg/Fischer-Dieskau/Halem, 1985, Koch Schwann
- Zemlinsky, Eine florentinische Tragödie, Albrecht/Soffel/Riegel/Sarabia, 1984, Schwann
- Zemlinsky, Der König Kandaules, Albrecht/Warren/O’Neal/Pederson, 1996, live in Hamburg, Capriccio
- Zemlinsky, Der Traumgörge, Albrecht/Martin-Ja/Protschka, 1988, Capriccio
- Zemlinsky, Der Zwerg, Albrecht/Nielsen/Studer/Haldas/Riegel/Weller, 1983, Schwann

Cultural offices
Preceded by Tadaaki Otaka	Principal Conductor, Yomiuri Nippon Symphony Orchestra; 1998–2007	Succeeded by Stanisław Skrowaczewski
Preceded by Ulf Schirmer	Principal Conductor, Danish National Symphony Orchestra; 2000–2004	Succeeded by Thomas Dausgaard
