= Marta Krásová =

Czech actress and opera singer

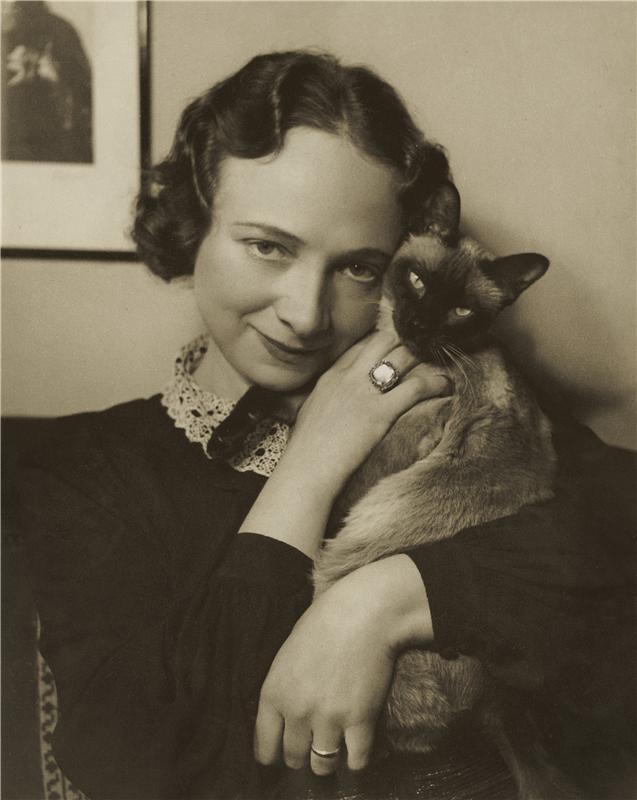
Portrait of Marta Krásová

Marta Krásová (16 March 1901 – 20 February 1970) was a Czech operatic mezzo-soprano who had an active international career with major opera houses in Europe from 1922 until 1966. Born in Protivín, she died in Vráž, in the Beroun District.
