= Věra Soukupová =

Czech mezzo-soprano (born 1932)

Věra Soukupová (born 12 April 1932) is a Czech mezzo-soprano.

Born in Prague, Soukupová studied singing at the Prague Conservatory and privately with Luis Kadeřábek and A. Mustanová-Linková. She won several competitions, including the international singing competition in Prague (1954), the international singing competition in Toulouse (1958), the competition at the Prague Spring Festival (1960), and the international singing competition in Rio de Janeiro (1963). She began her performance career as a concert singer in 1955 and in 1957 made her stage debut at the Divadlo Josefa Kajetána Tyla in Plzeň. In 1960 Soukupová became a principal artist at the National Theatre in Prague which has remained her principal home.
