= Lívia Ághová =

Slovak opera singer

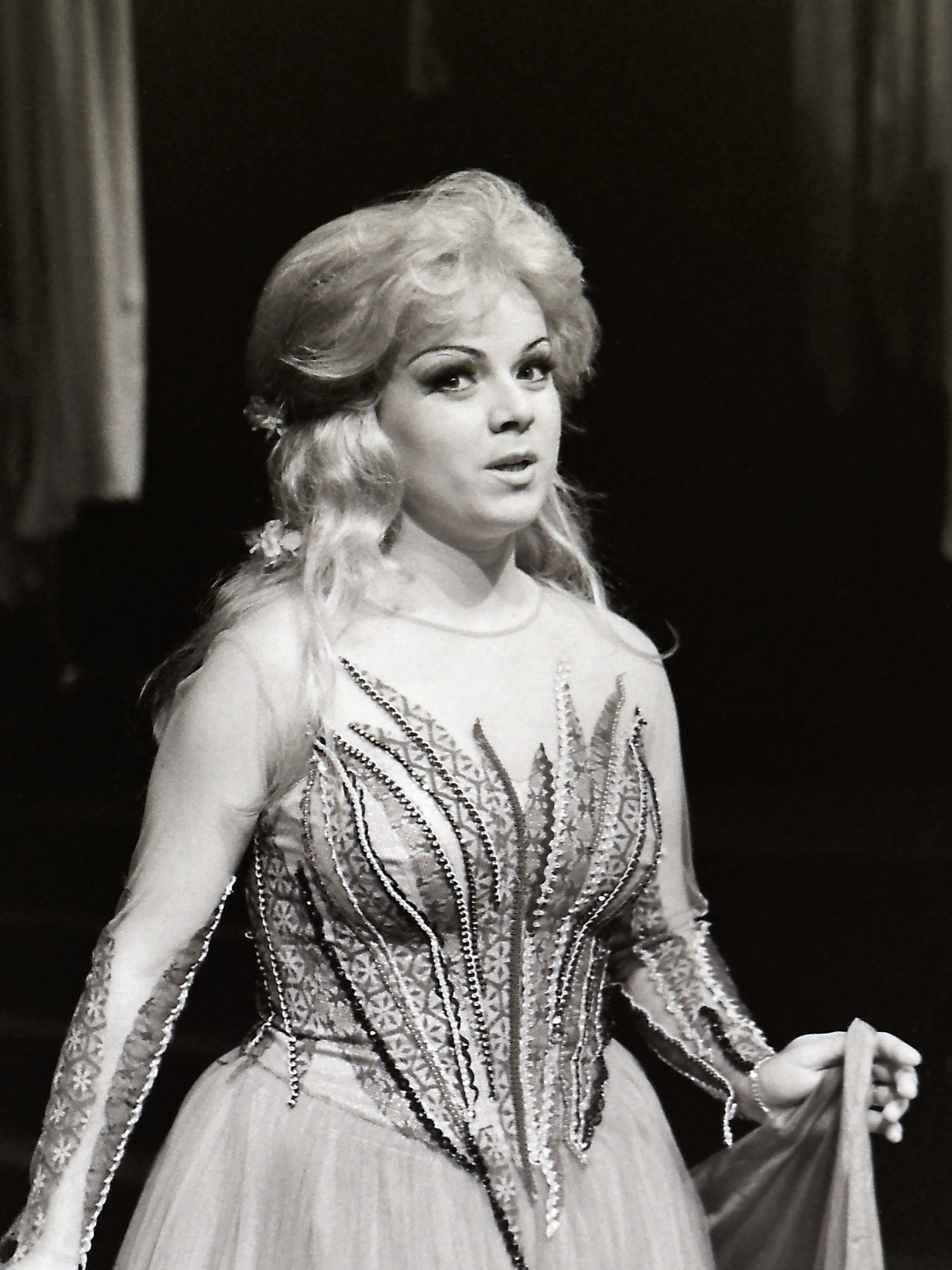

Background information
- Born: October 7, 1963 (age 62); Šaľa, Slovakia
- Occupation: National Theatre in Prague
- Instrument: Voice (Soprano)
- Years active: 1983–present

Lívia Ághová (born 7 October 1963) is a Slovak opera singer. She has been a principal soprano at the National Theatre in Prague since 1988. Her career has also taken her to many of the best opera houses and concert halls in North America and Europe. She has sung in numerous opera and concert recordings with such labels as Chandos, ORFEO, and Supraphon.

== Biography ==
Born in Šaľa, she entered the Bratislava Conservatory in 1979 where she studied singing for four years. Immediately after graduating in 1983 she was hired by the Slovak National Theatre (SNT) as a principal soprano. She sang at that house for five years where she was particularly admired portraying Mozart heroines like Susanna in Le Nozze di Figaro, Donna Elvira in Don Giovanni, and Pamina in The Magic Flute. Her other roles with the company included Mimi in Giacomo Puccini's La Boheme, Micaela in Georges Bizet's Carmen, and Marguerite in Charles Gounod's Faust.

In 1986 Ághová won two important music competitions, the international singing contest in Prague and the ARD's singing competition in Munich. This raised her profile considerably in the opera world and she was soon offered a contract with the Prague National Theatre (PNT) and offers for guest engagements throughout Europe. After her contract with the SNT ended at the conclusion of the 1987–1988 season, she joined the roster of principal singer at the PNT, where she remains to this day. She performed all of the aforementioned roles in Prague and added many other roles to her repertoire, including Nedda in Pagliacci, Marzelline in Fidelio, Mařenka in The Bartered Bride, Sophie in Der Rosenkavalier, and the title roles in Bohuslav Martinů's Julietta and Leoš Janáček's The Cunning Little Vixen to name just a few.

As a guest artist Ághová has appeared with the Berlin State Opera (Antonia in Les Contes d'Hoffmann), the Bavarian State Opera (Xenie Borisovna in Dimitrij), and the Hamburg State Opera (Giulietta in I Capuleti e i Montecchi). In 1990 she appeared at the Edinburgh Festival as Marguerite in Faust. The following year she performed at the Savonlinna Opera Festival as Donna Elvira in Don Giovanni. In 1994 she made her first appearance at the Houston Grand Opera as Liu in Puccini's Turandot and in 1996 she portrayed Lauretta in Puccini's Gianni Schicchi with the Prague State Opera. She has also been the soprano soloist in performances of Beethoven's 9th Symphony in Prague, Cologne, Bonn and Passau, and has performed in concerts with major orchestras in Austria, Germany, France, and Italy.
