= Máj (literary almanac) =

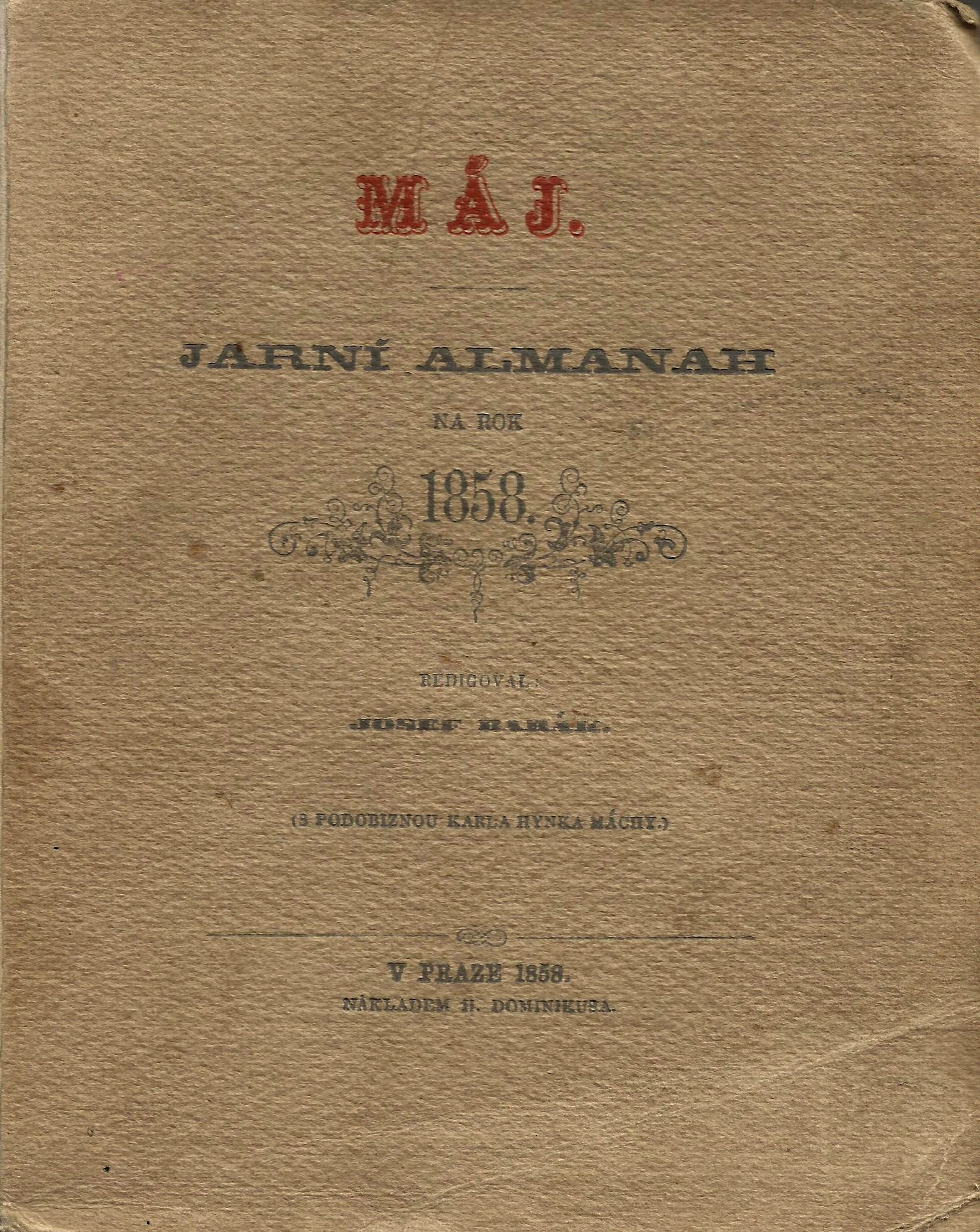

Máj was a Czech literary almanac published (in 1858, 1859, 1860 and 1862) by a group of authors centred around Jan Neruda and Vítězslav Hálek.

== Background ==
After the revolution of 1848 and its suppression, the cultural life of Czech people was weakened by the absolutism of the Austrian Empire's Bach government and also because a lot of intellectuals died. These included Ján Kollár, František Ladislav Čelakovský, Josef Kajetán Tyl, and Karel Havlíček Borovský. In 1853 two important masterpieces of Czech literature were published that avoided reflecting the political situation – Babička (The Grandmother) by Božena Němcová and Kytice by Karel Jaromír Erben. The first manifestation of the new generation of authors appeared in the literary almanac Lada Nióla published by Josef Václav Frič in 1856, which was the first to admire the legacy of Karel Hynek Mácha. The authors of the young generation did not have much to publish, and the only literary periodicals were in the hands of old and conservative writers (Jakub Malý, Lumír of Ferdinand Břetislav Mikovec).

== The almanac ==
The almanac was initiated by Jan Neruda, then a 24-year-old writer who had just entered his literary career with a collection of poems called Hřbitovní kvítí (Graveyard Flowers, 1857) which was not well received for its sorrowful scepticism. For this reason, Jan Neruda persuaded a journalist he knew, Josef Barák, who was on the contrary very popular for his tough attitude against the Bach system, to be the editor. The name for the almanac is said to come from Josef Václav Frič and shows the admiration for the imposing poem by Karel Hynek Mácha. The young authors gathered in the ballrooms of Karel Link and a café in Dominican Street (now Husova ulice 352/2), Prague. The almanac was published on 16 May 1858 (the feast of John of Nepomuk) by publisher Hermann Dominikus (another publisher who was suggested by Neruda and Hálek was not allowed to publish it by the police). The volume's first page had a dedication to Karel Hynek Mácha, and a portrait of the poet sketched to resemble a picture of John the Baptist by František Mašek (1836), in a little chapel in the compound of the ruins of Valdštejn Castle. Božena Němcová was the only author who was paid an honorarium for her contribution, which was motivated mainly by her difficult financial situation at the time.

== Reception and following volumes ==
The only extensive review was published in Kritische Blätter by Ignác Jan Hanuš. Other magazines either wrote nothing or just short reports. Jakub Malý wrote several diatribes against the young authors in a Písek magazine (Poutník od Otavy) which provoked the authors' activity, and in the next three years three more volumes of Máj were published, edited by Vítězslav Hálek. The group received more and more attention and in the end totally seized Czech literary life. The group was called Májovci, and took on new members (e.g. Gustav Pfleger Moravský, but after the last volume (1862) it gradually split up.

== Authors ==
- Josef Václav Frič (as M. Brodský)
- Vítězslav (J.) Hálek
- Adolf Heyduk
- Bohumil Janda Cidlinský (as V. Lánský)
- Rudolf Mayer
- Jan Neruda
- Anna Sázavská (Frič's wife)
- Sofie Podlipská (as Žofie)
- Karolina Světlá
- Josef Barák (his short story possibly written by Jan Neruda)
- Karel Jaromír Erben (as J. E. Miletínský)
- Božena Němcová
- Dr. Jan Palacký (son of František Palacký)
- Karel Sabina (as K. S.)
