= List of compositions by Zdeněk Fibich =

Below is a List of compositions by Zdeněk Fibich sorted by genre, Hud. number, opus number, date of composition, original and English titles. Hud. numbers are from Zdeněk Fibich: Tematický katalog (Zdeněk Fibich: Thematic Catalogue) by Vladimír Hudec (Prague, 2001).

Genre	Hud.	Opus	Composition date	Czech title (original title)	English title	Scoring	Notes
Opera	149	–	1870–1871	Bukovín	Bukovín		libretto by Karel Sabina
Opera	268	18	1882–1883	Nevěsta Messinská	The Bride of Messina		in 3 acts; libretto by Otakar Hostinský after the play by Friedrich Schiller
Opera	309	40	1893–1894	Bouře	The Tempest		in 3 acts; libretto by Jaroslav Vrchlický after the play by William Shakespeare
Opera	314	43	1894–1895	Hedy	Hedy		in 4 acts; libretto by Anežka Schulzová after Byron's Don Juan
Opera	216	50	1874–1877	Blaník	Blaník		in 3 acts; libretto by Eliška Krásnohorská
Opera	321	51	1896–1897	Šárka	Šárka		in 3 acts; libretto by Anežka Schulzová
Opera	325; 326	55; 60	1898–1899; 1898; 1898–1899	Pád Arkuna: Zpěvohra o předehře a o třech jednáních Helga, Předehra opery Pád Arkuna Dargun, Zpěvohra o 3 jednáních, dil II. opery Pád Arkuna	The Fall of Arkun Helga (Part I: Prologue) Dargun (Part II in 3 acts)		in a prologue and 3 acts; libretto by Anežka Schulzová
Melodrama	198	9	1874	Štědrý den	Christmas Day	for narrator and piano	orchestrated 1899; text by Karel Jaromír Erben
Melodrama	226	–	1877	Pomsta květin	Revenge of the Flowers	for narrator and piano	text by Ferdinand Freiligrath, translation by Jaroslav Vrchlický
Melodrama	240	14	1878	Věčnost	Eternity	for narrator and piano	text by Rudolf Mayer
Melodrama	267	15	1883	Vodník	The Water-goblin	for narrator and orchestra	text by Karel Jaromír Erben
Melodrama	271	–	1883	Královna Ema	Queen Emma	for narrator and piano	text by Jaroslav Vrchlický
Melodrama	293	30	1888	Hakon	Hakon	for narrator and piano	text by Jaroslav Vrchlický
Melodrama	294	31	1888–1889	Hippodamie – Námluvy Pelopovy	Hippodamia Trilogy – The Courtship of Pelops		in 4 acts; text by Jaroslav Vrchlický
Melodrama	296	32	1890	Hippodamie – Smír Tantalův	Hippodamia Trilogy – The Atonement of Tantalus		in 4 acts; text by Jaroslav Vrchlický
Melodrama	298	33	1891	Hippodamie – Smrt Hippodamie	Hippodamia Trilogy – Hippodamia's Death		in 4 acts; text by Jaroslav Vrchlický
Incidental music	7	–	1865	Ouvertura k Shakespearovu dramatu Romeo a Julie	Overture		for the play Romeo and Juliet by William Shakespeare
Incidental music	8	–	1865	Závěrečná hudba k Shakespearovu dramatu Romeo a Julie	Final Music		for the play Romeo and Juliet by William Shakespeare
Incidental music	829	–	1866	Meziaktní hudba k dramatu Clavigo	Interlude Music		for the play Clavigo by Johann Wolfgang von Goethe
Incidental music	861	–	1868	Pijácký sbor z hry Antonius a Kleopatra	Drinking Song		for the play Anthony and Cleopatra by William Shakespeare
Incidental music	115	–	1869	Zigeunerlied – Cikánská píseň ze hry Götz z Berlichingenu	Zigeunerlied		for the play Götz von Berlichingen by Johann Wolfgang von Goethe
Incidental music	153	–	1871	Pražský žid	The Jew of Prague		for the play by Josef Jiří Kolár
Incidental music		–	1876	Veřejné tajemství	The Public Secret		for the play by Carlo Gozzi
Incidental music	220	–	1877	Dora	Dora		for the play by Victorien Sardou
Incidental music	913	–	1876	Dudácká a sbor vil k Strakonickému dudáku	The Bagpiper of Strakonice		for the play by Josef Kajetán Tyl
Incidental music	225	–	1877	Stará panna	The Old Maid		for the play by Alexander Bergen
Incidental music	153	–	1871	Zpěv exulantů z tragédie Pražský Žid	Songs of Exile		for the play The Jew of Prague by Josef Jiří Kolár
Incidental music	914	–	1877	Pochod Pappenheimů z Valdštýnova tábora	Pappenheim March		for the play Wallenstein's Camp by Friedrich Schiller
Incidental music	920	–	1878	Měsíček jak mazaneček, kuplet do hry Pan Měsíček obchodník			for the play Pan Měsíček obchodník by Ladislav Stroupežnický
Incidental music	274	–	1883	Hudba k živému obrazu pro otevření Národního divadla	Music for a Tableau Vivant for the Opening of the National Theatre		
Incidental music	926	–	1883	Drahomíra, Hudba k dramatu	Drahomíra		for the play by Jaroslav Vrchlický
Incidental music	284	26	1886	Noc na Karlštejně, Ouvertura k veselohře	A Night at Karlštejn Castle		Overture for the play by Jaroslav Vrchlický; piano 4-hand arrangement, 1886
Incidental music	295	–	1890	Midasovy uši, Hudba k hře	Midas' Ears		for the play by Jaroslav Vrchlický
Incidental music	301	–	1892	Pietro Aretino, Hudba k veselohře	Pietro Aretino		for the play by Jaroslav Vrchlický
Incidental music	303	–	1892	Hudba k živému obrazu při oslavě 300. narození J.A. Komenského	Music for a Tableau Vivant for the Celebrations of the 300th Anniversary of the Birth of John Amos Comenius		
Incidental music	318	–	1896	Neklan, Hudba k tragédii	Neklan		for the tragedy by Julius Zeyer
Incidental music	329	–	1896–1900	Píseň pro Bohumila Ptáka	Song for Bohumil Pták		
Orchestral	153	–	1871	Pražský žid	The Jew of Prague	for orchestra	Overture
Orchestral	156	–	1871–1872	Orchestrální fantasie ve formě ouvertury	Orchestral Fantasie in Overture Form	for orchestra	
Orchestral	177	6	1873	Othello	Othello	for orchestra	Symphonic Poem after the play by William Shakespeare; piano 4-hand arrangement
Orchestral	179	37	1873	Záboj, Slavoj a Luděk	Záboj, Slavoj and Luděk	for orchestra	Symphonic Poem; piano 4-hand arrangement, 1893
Orchestral	180	35	1873	Veseloherní předehra	Comedy Overture	for orchestra	originally Op. 19; piano 4-hand arrangement
Orchestral	197	49	1874–1875	Toman a lesní panna	Toman and the Wood Nymph	for orchestra	piano 4-hand arrangement, 1875
Orchestral	208	–	1876	Prolog k otevření Nového českého divadla	Prologue for the Opening of the New Czech Theatre	for orchestra	
Orchestral	259	46	1880	Bouře	The Tempest	for orchestra	Symphonic Poem after the play by William Shakespeare; piano 4-hand arrangement, 1896
Orchestral	263	–	1881	Velká hudební monographie stavby Národního divadla	Great Musical Monograph of the Building of the National Theatre	for orchestra	
Orchestral	262	13	1881	Vesna	Spring	for orchestra	Symphonic Poem; piano 4-hand arrangement, 1882
Orchestral	270	17	1877–1883	Symfonie č. 1 F dur	Symphony No. 1 in F major	for orchestra	piano 4-hand arrangement, 1883
Orchestral	299	–	1891	Fanfáry k Jubilejní výstavě		for orchestra	
Orchestral	302	34	1892	Komenský, Slavnostní ouvertura	Comenius	for orchestra	Festive Overture; piano 4-hand arrangement, 1892
Orchestral	304	38	1892–1893	Symfonie č. 2 Es dur	Symphony No. 2 in E♭ major	for orchestra	piano 4-hand arrangement, 1893
Orchestral	306	39	1893	V podvečer, symfonická selanka	At Twilight, Idyll	for orchestra	piano 4-hand arrangement, 1898
Orchestral	323	52	1898	Oldřich a Božena, Předehra	Oldřich a Božena	for orchestra	Concert Overture; piano 4-hand arrangement, 1898
Orchestral	324	53	1898	Symfonie č. 3 e moll	Symphony No. 3 in E minor	for orchestra	piano 4-hand arrangement, 1898
Orchestral		54	1897–1898	Dojmy z venkova, Suita: 1. Měsíčná noč 2. Sousedská; 3. Vzhůru; 4. Na táčkách 5. Tanec v zeleni	Impressions from the Country: 1. Moonlit night 2. Country Dance; 3. Highlands Ho; 4. Fireside Talk; 5. Village Dance	for orchestra	Suite; piano 4-hand arrangement
Chamber music	114	27	1869	Sonatina d moll	Sonatina in D minor	for violin and piano	
Chamber music	174	–	1872	Klavírní trio f moll	Piano Trio in F minor	for violin, cello and piano	
Chamber music	183	–	1873	Jasná noc	Clear Night	for violin and piano	
Chamber music	188	11	1874	Klavírní kvartet e moll	Piano Quartet in E minor	for violin, viola, cello and piano	
Chamber music	189	–	1874	Smyčcový kvartet č. 1 A dur	String Quartet No. 1 in A major	for 2 violins, viola and cello	
Chamber music	193	–	1874	Houslová sonáta C dur	Sonata in C major	for violin and piano	
Chamber music	199	–	1875	Houslová sonáta D dur	Sonata in D major	for violin and piano	
Chamber music	214	–	1876	Klavírní trio Es dur	Piano Trio in E♭ major	for violin, cello and piano	
Chamber music	238	–	1878	Koncertní polonéza	Concert Polonaise	for violin and piano	
Chamber music	252	8	1878	Smyčcový kvartet č. 2 G dur	String Quartet No. 2 in G major	for 2 violins, viola and cello	
Chamber music	257	10	1879	Romance B dur	Romance in B♭ major	for violin and piano	
Chamber music	265	–	1882	Píseň bez slov	Song without Words	for 2 violins and piano	
Chamber music	269	–	1883	Thema con variazione pro smyčcový kvartet	Theme and Variations in B♭ major	for 2 violins, viola and cello	
Chamber music		16	1879	Selanka	Idyll	for clarinet (or violin) and piano (or orchestra)	
Chamber music		39a	1893	Poem v Des dur	Poem in D♭ major	for violin and piano	arranged by Jan Kubelík from a portion of V podvečer
Chamber music	308	42	1893	Klavírní kvintet D dur	Piano Quintet in D major	for violin, clarinet, horn, cello and piano	
Piano		1	1865	Jaro	Le printemps	for piano	
Piano		2	1865–1866	Pět lístků do památníku: 1. Věnování; 2. Fantastický kousek 3. Norská píseň rybářská 4. Capriccio; 5. Epilog	5 Feuillets d'album: 1. Dédicace; 2. Morceau fantastique 3. Chanson noroise des pêcheurs 4. Caprice; 5. Épilogue	for piano	
Piano		4	1866; 1871	Dvě scherza: 1. e moll 2. Es dur	2 Scherzi: 1. E minor 2. E♭ major	for piano	
Piano	223	19	1870–1877	Maličkosti, řada I.	Bagatelles, Series I	for piano 4-hands	
Piano	272	20	1883	2 Vigiliae	2 Vigiliae	for piano 4-hands	orchestrated 1885
Piano	280	22	1869–1885	Zlatý věk	The Golden Age	for piano 4-hands	12 Miniatures
Piano	282	24	1868; 1885	Fugato a Kolo víl	Fugato (1868) and Kolo víl (Fairies' Round-Dance) (1885)	for piano 4-hands	
Piano	281	25	1868; 1885	Ciacona a Impromptu	Chaconne (1868) and Impromptu (1885)	for piano 4-hands	
Piano	129	–	1871	Mazurek H dur	Mazurkas in B major	for piano	
Piano	206	–	1875?	Offenheim-Waltzer	Offenheim Waltzes	for piano	published under the pseudonym Giovanni Mihuczeni
Piano	222	–	1877	Suita g moll	Suite in G minor	for piano 4-hands	3 pieces
Piano		–	1877	Thema con variazione in B dur	Theme and Variations in B♭ major	for piano	
Piano		–	1880–1881	Valčík	Waltzes in C major	for piano	
Piano	266	–	1882	Polka A dur	Polka in A major	for piano	
Piano		–	1883	12.VIII.1881–18.X.1883	August 12, 1881 – October 18, 1883	for piano	
Piano		–	1885	Dvě rondina	2 Rondinos	for piano	
Piano	288	28	1886	Sonáta B dur	Sonata in B♭ major	for piano 4-hands	
Piano	290	29	1887	Z hor	From the Mountains	for piano	suite of 7 pieces
Piano		–	1891	Zastaveníčko, Serenáda G dur	Zastaveníčko, Serenade in G major	for piano	
Piano		–	1894	Dvě čtyřruční kousky	2 Pieces for Piano 4-Hands	for piano 4-hands	
Piano		–	1897	Dolce far niente	Dolce far niente	for piano	
Piano	311	41	1891–1894	Nálady, dojmy a upomínky	Moods, Impressions and Souvenirs [No. 1]	for piano	171 pieces (Nos. 1~171)
Piano	312	48	1893–1894	Maličkosti, řada II.	Bagatelles, Series II	for piano 4-hands	4 pieces
Piano	315	44	1895	Nálady, dojmy a upomínky (Novela)	Moods, Impressions and Souvenirs (Novela) [No. 2]	for piano	33 pieces (Nos. 172~204)
Piano	319	47	1895–1896	Nálady, dojmy a upomínky	Moods, Impressions and Souvenirs [No. 3]	for piano	148 pieces (Nos. 205~352)
Piano	327	57	1896–1898	Nálady, dojmy a upomínky	Moods, Impressions and Souvenirs [No. 4]	for piano	24 pieces (Nos. 353~376)
Piano	328	56	1898–1899	Malířské studie: 1. Lesní samota 2. Spor masopustu s postem 3. Rej blažených 4. Io a Jupiter; 5. Zahradní slavnost	Studies of Painters (Études Pictorales): 1. Forest Solitude; 2. The Strife between Shrovetide and Lent; 3. The Dance of the Blissful; 4. Io and Jupiter; 5. Garden Festivity	for piano	
Choral	167	–	1872	U mohyly	At the Graves	for chorus and piano 4-hands	words by Jiljí Jahn
Choral	187	55	1872–1874	Meluzína	Meluzína	for soloist, chorus and orchestra	Cantata after Gottfried Kinkel
Choral	192	–	1872–1874	Svatební scéna	Wedding Scene	for soloist, chorus and orchestra	Cantata
Choral	218	–	1877	Tichá noc	Silent Night	for male chorus	words by Gustav Pfleger Moravský
Choral	219	–	1877	Vytrvej!	Hold On!	for male chorus	words by Eliška Krásnohorská
Choral	233	–	1877	Frühlingslob		for mixed chorus	words by Ludwig Uhland
Choral	236	–	1878	Ždání / Prosba	Request	for chorus	words by Heinrich Heine
Choral	241	–	1878	Kantáta na památku pětistého výročí úmrtí Karla IV.	Cantata to Commemorate the 500th Anniversary of the Death of Charles IV	for chorus	words by Josef Srb-Debrnov
Choral	255	–	1879	Žalm 64	Psalm 64	for mixed chorus	Psalm 64
Choral	261	23	1880–1881	Jarní romance	A Springtime Tale	for soprano, bass, chorus and orchestra	Cantata after Jaroslav Vrchlický
Choral	276	–	1884	Letní	Summer	for children's chorus	words by Vilma Sokolovská
Choral	279	21	1885	Missa Brevis F dur	Missa Brevis in F major	for chorus and organ (string orchestra ad libitum)	
Choral	701	–	1886	Nechoď tam, pojď radš k nám	Don't Go There, Come to Us Instead	for female chorus	folksong
Choral	702	–	1886	Ó Velvary	O, Vervary	for male chorus	folksong
Choral	703	–	1886	Proč bychom veselí nebyli?	Why Should We Not Be Merry?	for male chorus	folksong
Choral	704	–	1886	Proč sem jdeš?	Why Are You Coming Here?	for female chorus	folksong
Vocal	15	–	1865	Wünsch			words by Friedrich Rückert
Vocal	18	–	1865	König Wiswamistra			words by Heinrich Heine
Vocal	22	–	1865	Ende			words by Heinrich Heine
Vocal	67	–	1866	Eisblumen			words by Moritz Gottlieb Saphir
Vocal	70	–	1866	Dein Bild			words by Moritz Gottlieb Saphir
Vocal	71	–	1866	Ihr Lied			words by Heinrich Heine
Vocal	73	–	1866	Am Meer			words by Heinrich Heine
Vocal	76	–	1866	Wandl' ich in dem Wald			words by Heinrich Heine
Vocal	77	3	1865–1866; 1865; 1866	Dva zpěvy (Zwei Gesänge): 1. Ich will meine Seele tauchen 2. Sommerabend	2 Songs	for voice and piano	words by Heinrich Heine
Vocal	82	–	1867	Verloren			words by Joseph von Eichendorff
Vocal	86	–	1867	Ihr Bildnis			words by Heinrich Heine
Vocal	87	–	1867	Wasserfahrt			words by Heinrich Heine
Vocal	92	–	1868	Mädchen mit dem roten Mündchen			words by Heinrich Heine
Vocal	93	–	1868	Nachtlied			words by Joseph von Eichendorff
Vocal	94	–	1868	An ein Mädchen			words by J. F. Degen
Vocal	100	–	1868	Bitte			words by Nicolaus Lenau
Vocal	101	–	1868	Oh, wär' ich ein See			words by Hafez
Vocal	106	–	1869	Altes Lied (Es was ein alter König)			words by Heinrich Heine
Vocal	107	–	1869	Frage (Was soll ich sagen?)			words by Adelbert von Chamisso
Vocal	116	–	1869	An den Mond			words by Johann Wolfgang von Goethe
Vocal	120	–	1869	Fürbitte der Blumen			words by Heinrich Heine
Vocal	121	–	1869	Sturmnacht			words by Heinrich Heine
Vocal	122	–	1869	Am Meeresstrande / Abend am Meere			words by the composer
Vocal	127	–	1870	Dein Bild			words by Heinrich Heine
Vocal	130	–	1870	Erwartung			1st setting; words by Heinrich Heine
Vocal	133	–	1870	Erwartung			2nd setting; words by Heinrich Heine
Vocal	134	–	1871	Wilhelm Meisters Lehrjahre: 1. Lied der Mignon (Heiß mich nicht reden); 2. Lied des Mignon (So laßt mich scheinen); 3. Kennst du das Land; 4. Lied der Mignon (Nur wer die Sehnsucht kennt); 5. Lied des Harfners (An die Türen will ich schleichen); 6. Lied des Harfners (Wer nie sein Brot mit Tränen aß); 7. Philinens Lied; 8. Des Harfners Lied (Wer sich der Einsamkeit ergibt); 9. Des Harfners Ballade (Der Sänger) (Was hör' ich draußen von dem Tor)	Wilhelm Meister's Apprenticeship		9 songs; words from Wilhelm Meisters Lehrjahre by Johann Wolfgang von Goethe
Vocal	135	–	1871	Píseň Hildebrantova (Hildenbrandlied)			words by Joseph Viktor Schleffel
Vocal	145	–	1871	Die Höh'n und Berge			words by Joseph von Eichendorff
Vocal	146	–	1871	Mein Knecht! Steh' auf!			words by Heinrich Heine
Vocal	148	5	1871	Patero písní z Večerních písní: 1. Umlklo stromů šumění 2. Na nebi plném hvězdiček 3. Ty dívko zvláště líbezná 4. Tvé oko krásné jezero 5. Přilítlo jaro zdaleka	5 Songs from "Evening Songs"	for voice and piano	poems from Večerní písně (Evening Songs) by Vítězslav Hálek
Vocal	150	–	1871	Tři písně: 1. Róže; 2. Na nebi měsíc s hvězdami 3. Tak často mi to připadá	3 Songs		1. words from Dvůr Králové Manuscript; 2.~3. words by Vítězslav Hálek
Vocal	155	–	1871	Dvě písně z Rukopisu královédvorského: 1. Skřívánek; 2. Opuščená	2 Songs from the Dvůr Králové Manuscript		words by Václav Hanka
Vocal	157	–	1871–1872	Patero zpěvů: 1. Tak mne kouzlem ondy jala 2. Kdyby všecky slzičky 3. Róže; 4. Na nebi měsíc s hvězdami 5. Tak často mně to připadá	5 Songs		words by František Čelakovský, Václav Hanka and Vítězslav Hálek
Vocal		–	1872	Der Asra			words from Der Asra, a poem by Heinrich Heine
Vocal	160	–	1872	Es haben uns're Herzen			words by Heinrich Heine
Vocal		–	1872	Die Sterbende			words by Adelbert von Chamisso
Vocal		–	1872	9 Gedichte	9 Poems		
Vocal	171	–	1872	3 Lieder (Tři písně): 1. Tränen (Slzy); 2. Abschied (Rozloučení); 3. Nach Sevilla (Do Sevilly)	3 Songs	for voice and piano	1. words by Adalbert von Chamisso; 2. words by Joseph von Eichendorff; 3. words by Clemens Brentano
Vocal	172	–	1871–1872	Osm dvojzpěvů: 1. Tam pod javorem jinoch spal 2. Když patřím na kvítečka 3. Ty perly modrojasné 4. Po lásce tvé jsem toužil 5. Toužebný jara již zavítal čas 6. Jak hvězdy nebes kvítí 7. O tobě sním, když země v ranní záři se rozplývá 8. V kterém kraji poutník složí slabé údy naposled?	8 Duets	for 2 voices and piano	words by Josef Srb-Debrnov after Joseph Freiherr von Eichendorff, Heinrich Heine, Adelbert von Chamisso, Friedrich Rückert and Johann Wolfgang von Goethe
Vocal		–	1872	Erlkönigs Tochter			words by Johann Gottfried Herder
Vocal	181	7	1872–1873; 1872; 1873; 1872; 1873	4 Balladen (Čtyři balady): 1. Der Spielmann; 2. Waldnacht; 3. Loreley; 4. Tragödie	4 Ballades	for voice and piano	1. words by Adalbert von Chamisso; 2. words by Hermann Lingg; 3.~4. words by Heinrich Heine
Vocal	182	–	1873	Jest mnoho domů na světě		for soprano and alto	Canon; words by Ladislav Quis
Vocal	204	–	1875	Kytice	Bouquet		words from the Dvůr Králové Manuscript
Vocal	205	–	1875	Žežhulice	Cuckoo		words from the Dvůr Králové Manuscript
Vocal	221	–	1877	Jahody	Strawberries		words from the Dvůr Králové Manuscript
Vocal	227	–	1874–1877; 1875; 1876; 1875; 1876; 1874; 1876; 1876; 1876; 1877; 1877	Neue Lieder: 1. Sprecht ihr mitternacht'gen Sterne; 2. Oh rauh der Herbst; 3. Die Sennin; 4. Wie der Mond; 5. Wie bist du meine Königin; 6. Die Jungfrau schäft 7. Im Frühling; 8. Der bleiche Heinrich; 9. Ich armes Klosterfräulein; 10. Legende	New Songs	for voice and piano	10 Songs; 1. words by Hermann Lingg; 2. words by Emanuel Geibel; 3. words by Nicolaus Lenau; 4. words by Heinrich Heine; 5. words by Georg Friedrich Daumer after Hafez; 6. words by Heinrich Heine; 7. words by Julius Sturm; 8. words by Heinrich Heine; 9. words by Justinus Kerner; 10. words by Ludwig Bowitsch
Vocal	237	12	1872–1878; 1872; 1876; 1877; 1877; 1878; 1876	Šestero písní: 1. Má dívenka jak růže 2. Kohoutek; 3. Holubička z dubu 4. Pomoc pro náramnou lásku 5. V lese 6. Jarní	6 Songs	for voice and piano	1. words by Robert Burns; 2.~4. words by František Čelakovský; 5. words by Ladislav Quis; 6. words by Klaus Grothe
Vocal	243	–	1878	Lass mich von deinen Aug'			
Vocal	275	–	1884	Nevěrná píseň	Unfaithful Song	for 3 female voices	
Vocal		–	1884	Letní píseň	Summer Song	for 2 voices and piano or harmonium	
Vocal		–	1884	Jarní píseň	Spring Song	for 2 voices and piano or harmonium	
Vocal	289	–	1884	Společenská píseň	Sociable Song	for 2 voices and piano or harmonium	
Vocal	300	36	1891	Jarní paprsky: 1. Předtucha jara 2. Noční nálada 3. Pěvcova útěcha 4. Mignon; 5. To tam!; 6. Snící jezero 7. Večerní píseň 8. Večerní modlitba 9. Probuzení jara 10. Májová noc 11. Veselá dívčina 12. Opuštěná; 13. Žena vojínova 14. Požehnání	Spring Rays	for voice and piano	14 songs 1. words by Jaroslav Vrchlický; 2. words by Ladislav Dolanský after Joseph Freiherr von Eichendorff; 3. words by Ladislav Dolanský after Justinus Kerner; 4. words by Ladislav Quis after Johann Wolfgang von Goethe; 5. words by Ladislav Dolanský after Joseph Freiherr von Eichendorff; 6. words by Ladislav Dolanský after Julius Mosen; 7. words by Ladislav Dolanský after anonymous 8. words by Ladislav Dolanský after Joseph Freiherr von Eichendorff; 9. words by Ferdinand Pujman after Julius Sturm; 10. words by Ferdinand Pujman after Emanuel Geibel; 11.~13. words by Ferdinand Pujman after Klaus Groth; 14. words by Ferdinand Pujman after Johann Georg Fischer
Vocal	305	–	1893	Tys mi tak blízko	You Are Near Me		words by Jaroslav Vrchlický
Vocal		–	1893	Když k vám vesel chodím	When Merrily I Walk to You		words by Jan Neruda
Vocal		–	1878; 1894	Mne z oka tvého nech			
Vocal	316	45	1895	Poupata, pět dětských písní: 1. Před spaním 2. Pěnkava a sedmihlásek 3. Okáč; 4. Lesní zvonky 5. Zahrajem si na vojáky	Buds, 5 Children's Songs		words by Josef Václav Sládek and Vilma Sokolovská
Vocal	317	–	1895	Drahý zpěvák	Dear Singer		words by František Čelakovský
