= Evening song =

Evening Song or Songs may refer to:

== Books ==
- Evening Songs, cycle of poems by Vítězslav Hálek
- Evening Song, a poem by Sidney Lanier

== Music ==
- Abendlied (Evening song) by Gabriel Rheinberger
- Abendlied (Evening song) by Matthias Claudius
- "Evening Song", List of compositions by Modest Mussorgsky
- Evening Songs, instrumental pieces by Kalervo Tuukkanen (1909-79)
- Večerní písně (Evening Songs) Op. 31 for voice and piano after poems by Vítězslav Hálek, List of compositions by Antonín Dvořák
- Večerní písně (Evening Songs), List of compositions by Zdeněk Fibich
- Vecerni pisne (Evening Songs) 1879 List of compositions by Bedřich Smetana
- "Evening Song", song for voice & piano, A. 24 Charles Tomlinson Griffes
- "Evening Song", by Henry Kimball Hadley (1871-1937)
- Serena (genre), 13th-century Occitan evening song

=== Albums ===
- Evening Songs (Julian Lloyd Webber album)

== See also ==
- Evensong (disambiguation)
