= Gustav Pfleger Moravský =

Czech writer (1833–1875

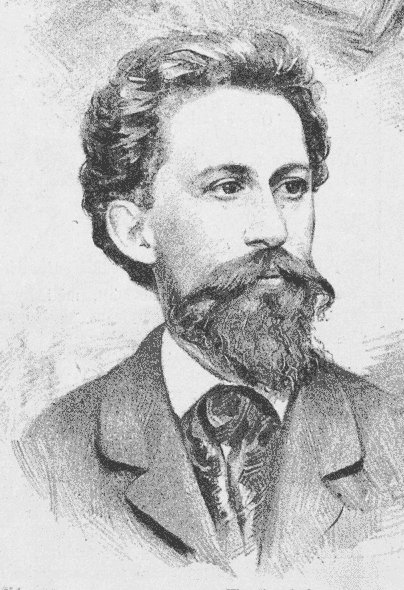
Gustav Pfleger Moravský; portrait by Jan Vilímek

Gustav Pfleger Moravský (27 July 1833 – 20 September 1875) was a Czech novelist, poet and dramatist. He is generally associated with the Májovci, but was not actually a member of that group.

== Life and work ==
Pfleger was born on 27 July 1833 in Bystřice nad Pernštejnem, Moravia, Austrian Empire. His father, Matyáš Pfleger, was the district forester. Gustav Pfleger Moravský spent his childhood and attended school in various places throughout Moravia, including Kojetín and Na Skalách near Lhota. In 1843, when his father died, his mother, Johanna Pflegerová, née Hendrichová, took the family to Prague.

There, he initially attended a German-language school, operated by the Carmelites, but had difficulty with German and was held back a year. After switching to a public grammar school, his German improved, until he began speaking it more freely than Czech. This changed again, during the Revolutions of 1848 in the Austrian Empire, when he became more aware of his Czech nationality. By 1851, he had transferred to a Czech-language gymnasium, where he studied with Professor Václav Kliment Klicpera. His classmates there included Jan Neruda and Ferdinand Schulz. Lung disease forced him to give up his studies there in 1852, but he continued to educate himself and was eventually conversant with six languages.

In 1854, he found employment as a clerk at Česká spořitelna (savings bank), but soon found office work to be monotonous so, in 1856, he traveled throughout Germany; visiting Dresden, Berlin and Hamburg, then the rural areas of Silesia and Saxony. During his time at the bank, he had begun writing poetry, which he continued to do. In 1857, he published his first collection of poetry, Dumky, in the literary magazine, Lumír. It was not very successful. His second collection, Cypřiše (Cypresses) was published in 1861 under his adopted name, "Moravský". The critical reception was much better, and eighteen poems from the collection were later set to music by Antonín Dvořák. That same year, he published a novel in verse, Mr. Vyšinský, about the younger Czech generation, which was influenced by the works of Pushkin and Lermontov.

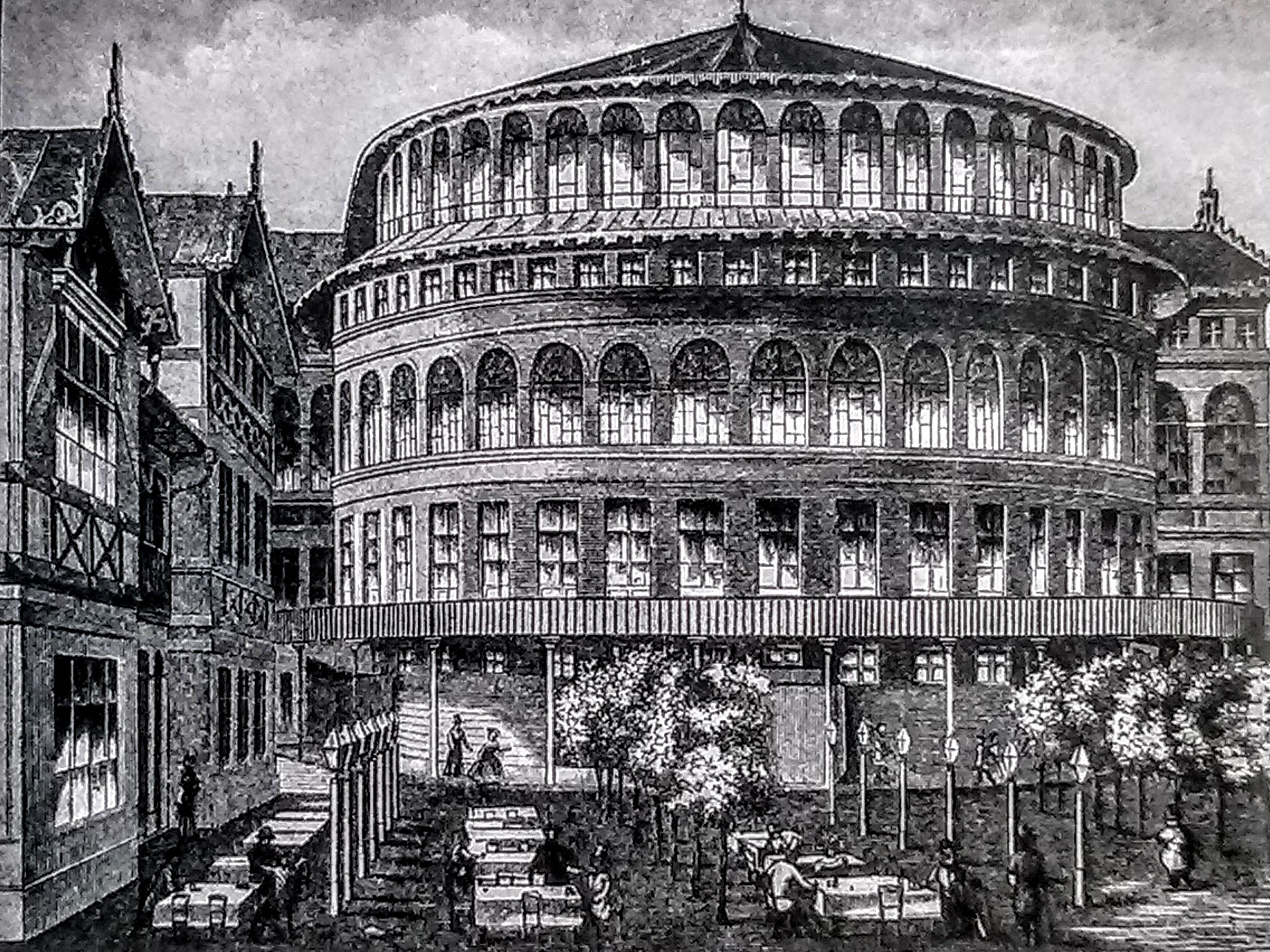
The New Town Theatre in 1885

In the mid 1860s, he briefly served as the official playwright for the New Town Theatre. He also developed an interest in French literature, doing translations and writing critiques for the magazines Politik (German) and Národního pokroku (National Progress, Czech), where he also worked as an editor. Some of his theatrical works from this period have been lost and one, Záboj (The Charge), was intended as a libretto, but was never set to music.

In 1863, he published one of his two major works, the novel Ztracený život (Lost Life), which involves the events of 1848, the repression that followed, and the fate of the revolutionary, Josef Václav Frič. The following year, he produced another novel, Z malého světa (From a Small World), the first Czech-language novel about working-class life; describing events leading up to the Weavers' Uprising of 1844. His only other surviving novel, Pani fabrikantová ('Mrs Factoryworker'), is set at the spa in Sedmihorky, a place he had visited for treatment several times. It involves a romantic affair between a working woman and a nobleman, and received little critical attention.

He died in Prague of tuberculosis on 20 September 1875, and is interred at the Lesser Town Cemetery in Prague. Streets have been named after him in Ostrava and Brno.
