= Ignát Herrmann =

Czech novelist, satirist and editor

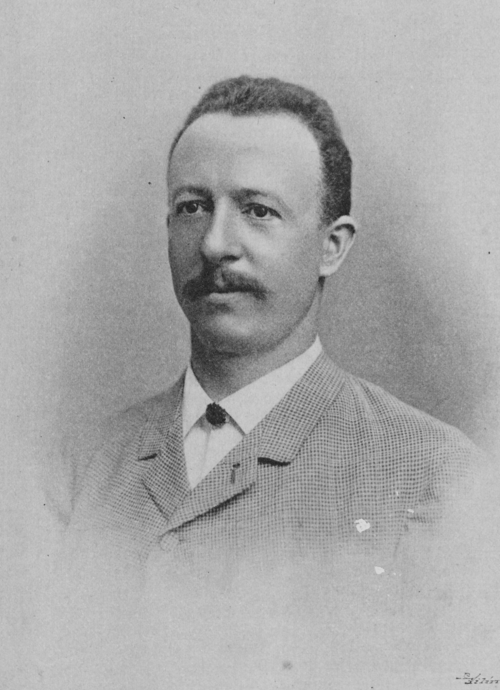
Ignát Herrmann (1895)

Ignát Herrmann (12 August 1854 in Chotěboř – 8 July 1935 in Řevnice) was an Austro-Hungarian and later Czechoslovak novelist, satirist and editor. He sometimes used the pseudonym Vojta Machatý, Švanda.

The thirteenth child of a solicitor's copyist, he attended school in Hradec Králové, then in 1868 travelled to Prague to begin a career in retail. He worked for several companies, from 1873 for the publisher Otto-Verlag, for whom he became a courtroom reporter. From 1876 to 1878 he edited the satirical magazine Paleček; in 1882 he founded his own, Švanda dudák, which he edited almost continuously until 1930. He worked for several years at a law firm before becoming, in 1885, editor of the Národní listy, for which he had been an administrator. From 1888 he was chairman of the "May Society" of Czech authors (Májovci). He edited the first edition (1892-4) of the complete works of Jan Neruda.

His literary work was closely tied to his journalism, and mostly dealt with the personalities and life of Prague. His first novel was the partly autobiographical U snědeného krámu (1890). The same year he wrote a play, Manželova přítelkyně, but it was not successful. He wrote several serial novels like Páté přes deváté and Muž bez třináctky. In Národní listy he published his most successful novel Otec Kondelík a ženich Vejvara (1898) as well as the sequel Tchán Kondelík a zeť Vejvara (1906). The main character, narrow-minded old "Papa Kondelík", is his most famous creation. His fiction has frequently been adapted for the cinema.

He wrote 387 short stories, but the only English translations are of "Childless" and "Mr Vašek." German translations are collected in Allerlei Tierchen und Leuchten (1935) and Ausgewählte Geschichten (1908). There are also a handful of Esperanto translations.

== Novels and stories ==
- Z chudého kalamáře (short stories)
- Pražské figury
- U snědeného krámu
- Pražské figury
- Domácí štěstí
- Páté přes deváté
- Humor parnassu českého
- Historie o doktoru Faustovi
- Otec Kondelík a ženich Vejvara
- Tchán Kondelík a zeť Vejvara
- Artur a Leontýnka

== Bibliography ==
- M. Hýsek. Ignát Herrmann, Prague 1934.
