= Statue of Jan Neruda, Prague =

Statue in Prague, Czech Republic

Coordinates: 50°04′59″N 14°24′08″E

Statue of Jan Neruda
- Socha Jana Nerudy (Czech)
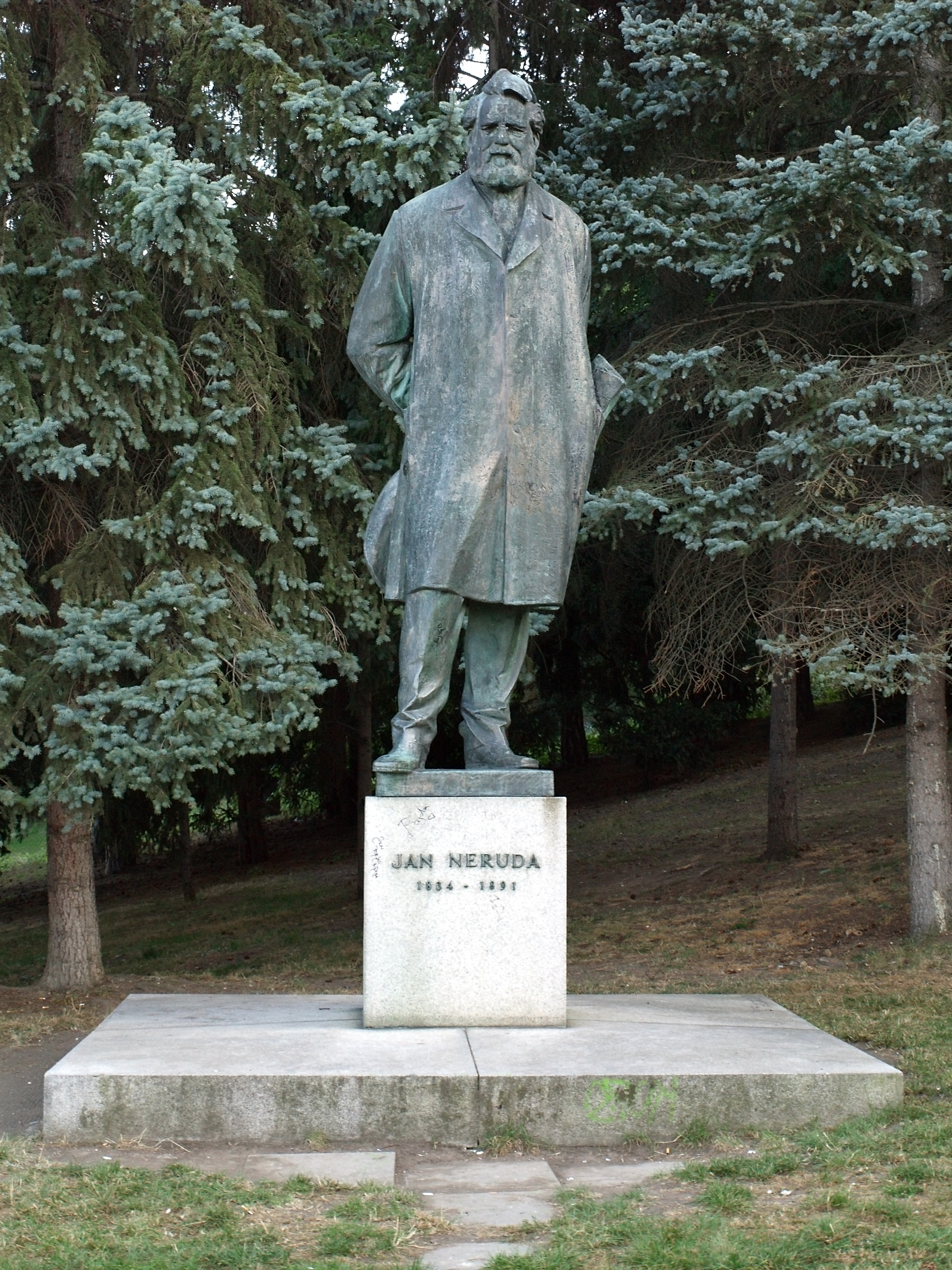
- The statue in 2009
- Year: 1970
- Type: Sculpture
- Location: Prague, Czech Republic

The statue of Czech poet and publicist Jan Neruda (Czech: Socha Jana Nerudy) is an outdoor 1970 sculpture by Jan Simota and Karel Lapka, installed at Petřín, Malá Strana in Prague, Czech Republic.
