= Even Song =

Even Song may refer to:

- "Even Song", a song by Gomez from their 2002 album In Our Gun
- Even Song, a band on Displeased Records
- "Even (Headman)", a song by Dispatch on their album Who Are We Living For?.

== See also ==
- Evensong (disambiguation)
