= Povídky malostranské =

1877 collection of short stories by Jan Neruda

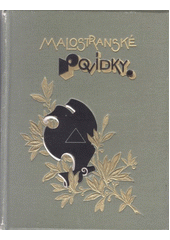
Cover of the 1902 edition.

Povídky malostranské (in English: Tales of the Lesser Quarter) is a collection of short stories by the Czech writer Jan Neruda that appeared in 1878. It is his most popular work and remains an important text in many Czech literature courses. As the title suggests, the stories take place in the Malá Strana quarter of Prague and paint a detailed image of the life 19th century Prague petty bourgeoisie and ordinary city dwellers.
