= Májovci =

The Májovci ("May School") were a significant group of Czech novelists and poets of the second half of the 19th century, who were inspired by the work of Karel Hynek Mácha, Karel Havlíček Borovský and Karel Jaromír Erben.

After the fall of Metternich's absolutism in the Revolution of 1848, there appeared on the scene a young generation preoccupied with urban life and contemporary social problems, and determined to reintroduce Czech as a literary language. Politically they promoted the cause of liberty, democracy, and social justice, fighting the reactionary Bach government and making efforts to improve the status of the Czech nation within the Austro-Hungarian Empire.

The first yearbook of the group was published in 1858. Named Máj ("May") after Mácha's great poem, it included contributions by Jan Neruda and Vítězslav Hálek, as well as Adolf Heyduk, Rudolf Mayer, Karolina Světlá, Jakub Arbes, Karel Sabina, Josef Václav Frič and Gustav Pfleger Moravský. Their verse tales were described as Byronic although the closer influence was probably Pushkin. Their efforts were to a great extent responsible for bringing Czech literature into the European mainstream.

They were major advocates of the National Theatre of Prague, for which the foundation stone was laid in 1868. Their reformist concerns were also reflected in journalistic endeavours. Newspapers and magazines associated with the Májovci include Národní listy, Čas, Lumír, and Květy.

Later groups included the Lumírovci (connected with the newspaper Lumír) and the Ruchovci (connected with the National Theatre).

== List of notable Májovci ==
- Jakub Arbes
- Josef Václav Frič
- Vítězslav Hálek
- Ignát Herrmann
- Adolf Heyduk
- Rudolf Mayer
- Jan Neruda
- Gustav Pfleger Moravský
- Karel Sabina
- Karolina Světlá
- Josef Barák
- Božena Němcová
