= Zavlekov =

- Municipality
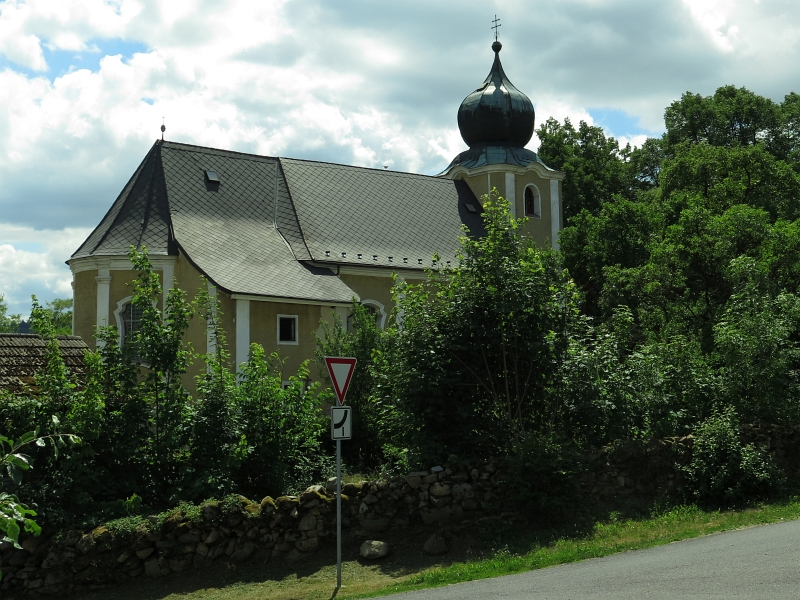
- Church of the Holy Trinity

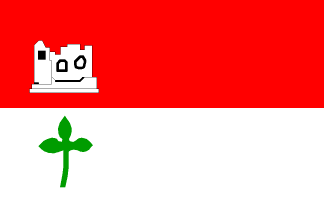
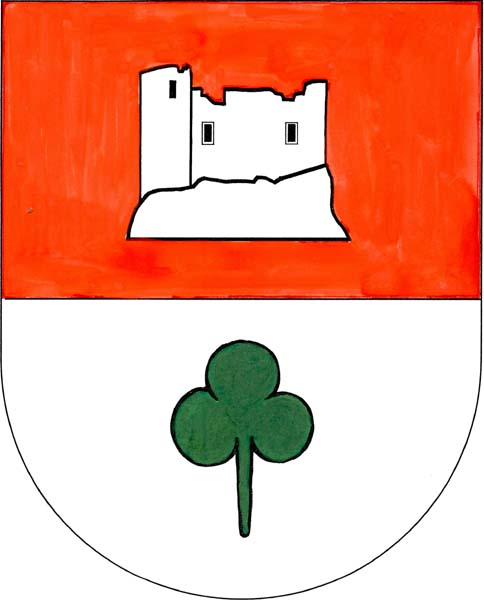
- Flag Coat of arms

- Location in the Czech Republic
- Coordinates: 49°20′15″N 13°29′26″E
- Country: Czech Republic
- Region: Plzeň
- District: Klatovy
- First mentioned: 1334

Area
  - Total: 13.45 km^{2} (5.19 sq mi)
- Elevation: 552 m (1,811 ft)

Population (2026-01-01)
  - Total: 413
  - Density: 30.7/km^{2} (79.5/sq mi)
- Time zone: UTC+1 (CET)
  - Summer (DST): UTC+2 (CEST)
- Postal codes: 340 34, 341 42
- Website: ouzavlekov.cz

Zavlekov (German: Zamlekau) is a municipality and village in Klatovy District in the Plzeň Region of the Czech Republic. It has about 400 inhabitants.

== Administrative division ==
Zavlekov consists of five municipal parts (in brackets population according to the 2021 census):

- Zavlekov (294)
- Mladice (28)
- Plichtice (52)
- Skránčice (44)
- Vlčnov (6)

== Etymology ==
The initial name of Zavlekov was probably Zavlekom, but the rare suffix -om was adapted to similar names and replaced by the common Czech suffix -ov. The name was derived from the personal name Zavlek, meaning "Zavlek's".

== Geography ==
Zavlekov is located about 15 kilometres (9 mi) southeast of Klatovy and 44 km (27 mi) south of Plzeň. It lies in the Blatná Uplands. The Úslava River flows through the municipality. The municipal territory is rich in fishponds. The largest of them is Hnačovský rybník, which, however, lies only partially in the municipality.

== History ==
The first written mention of Zavlekov is from 1334, when the village was owned by the Lords of Velhartice.

== Demographics ==
Historical population

Year	Pop.	±%
1869	1,269	—
1880	1,255	−1.1%
1890	1,164	−7.3%
1900	1,103	−5.2%
1910	1,119	+1.5%

Year	Pop.	±%
1921	1,133	+1.3%
1930	1,018	−10.2%
1950	750	−26.3%
1961	698	−6.9%
1970	586	−16.0%

Year	Pop.	±%
1980	460	−21.5%
1991	424	−7.8%
2001	413	−2.6%
2011	428	+3.6%
2021	424	−0.9%

Source: Censuses

== Transport ==
The I/22 road (the section from Klatovy to Strakonice) runs through the municipality.

== Sights ==
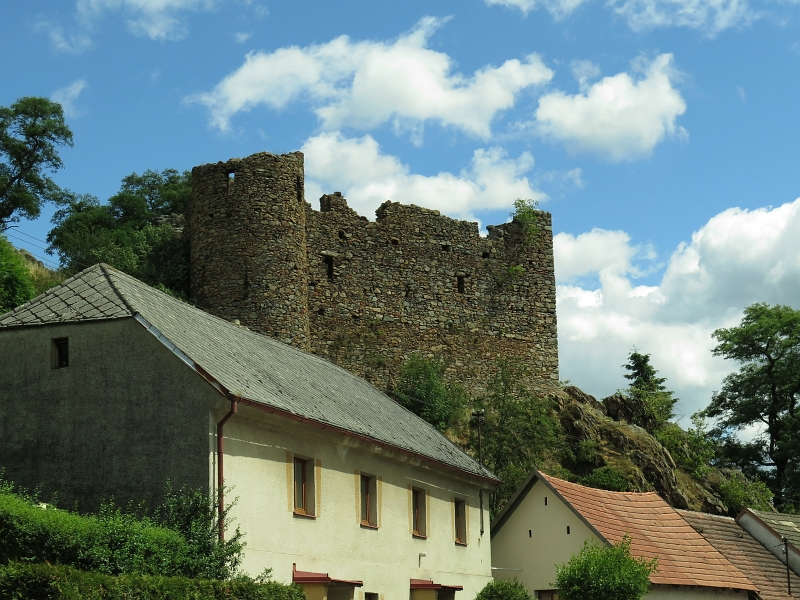
Ruin of the fortress

A landmark of Zavlekov is a ruin of the old fortress from the 14th century. A part of the residential tower-shaped palace connected to the round bastion has been preserved. The new fortress was built in the centre of the village in the second half of the 16th century. Only the Gothic portal survived from it. A granary was built from the remains of the new fortress. It is protected as a technical monument.

The most important monument is the Church of the Holy Trinity. It was built in the Baroque style in 1773 on the site of an old Gothic church.

== Notable people ==
- Rudolf Mayer (1837–1865), poet
