= Předhradí =

- Municipality
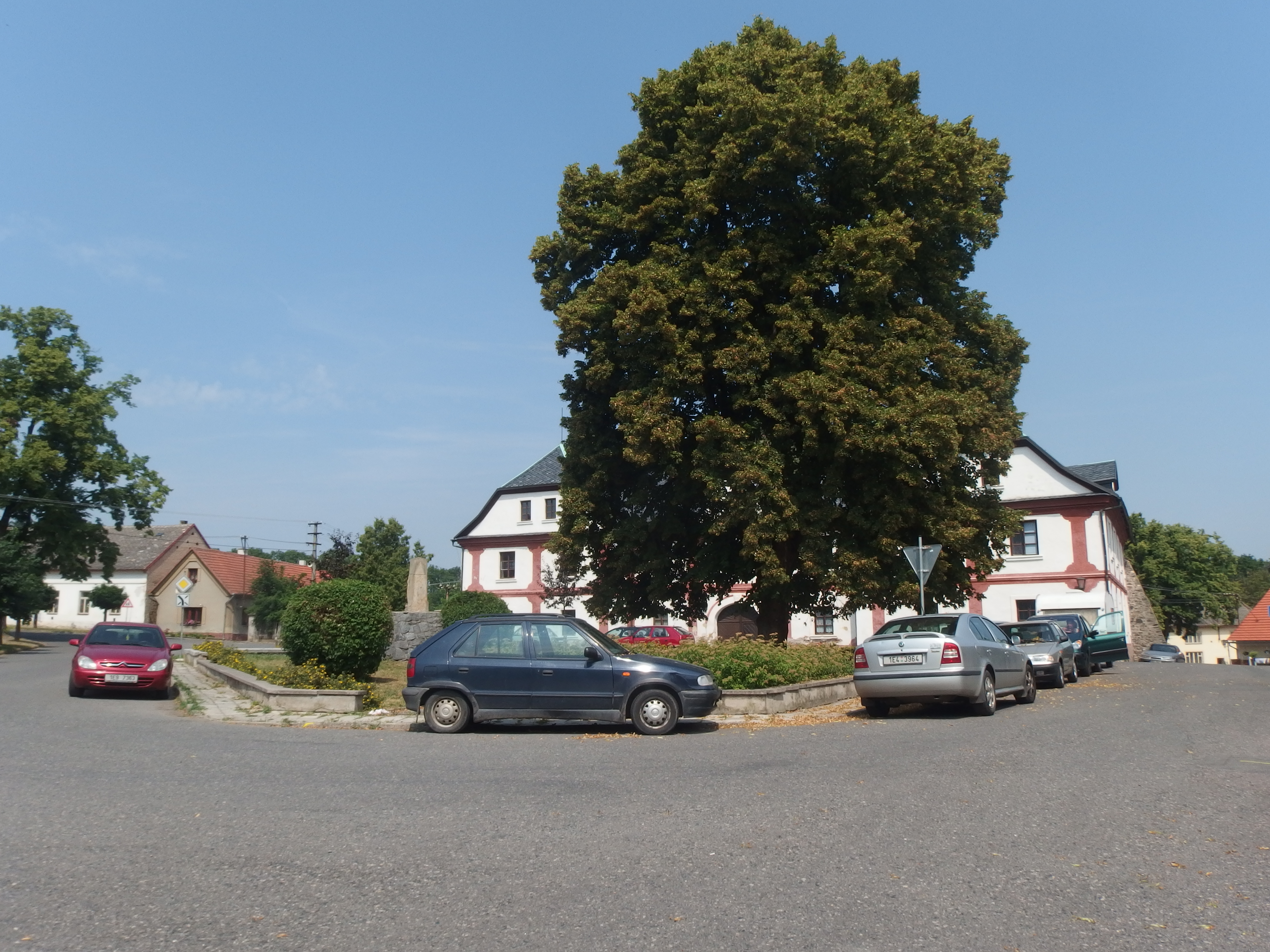
- Centre of Předhradí

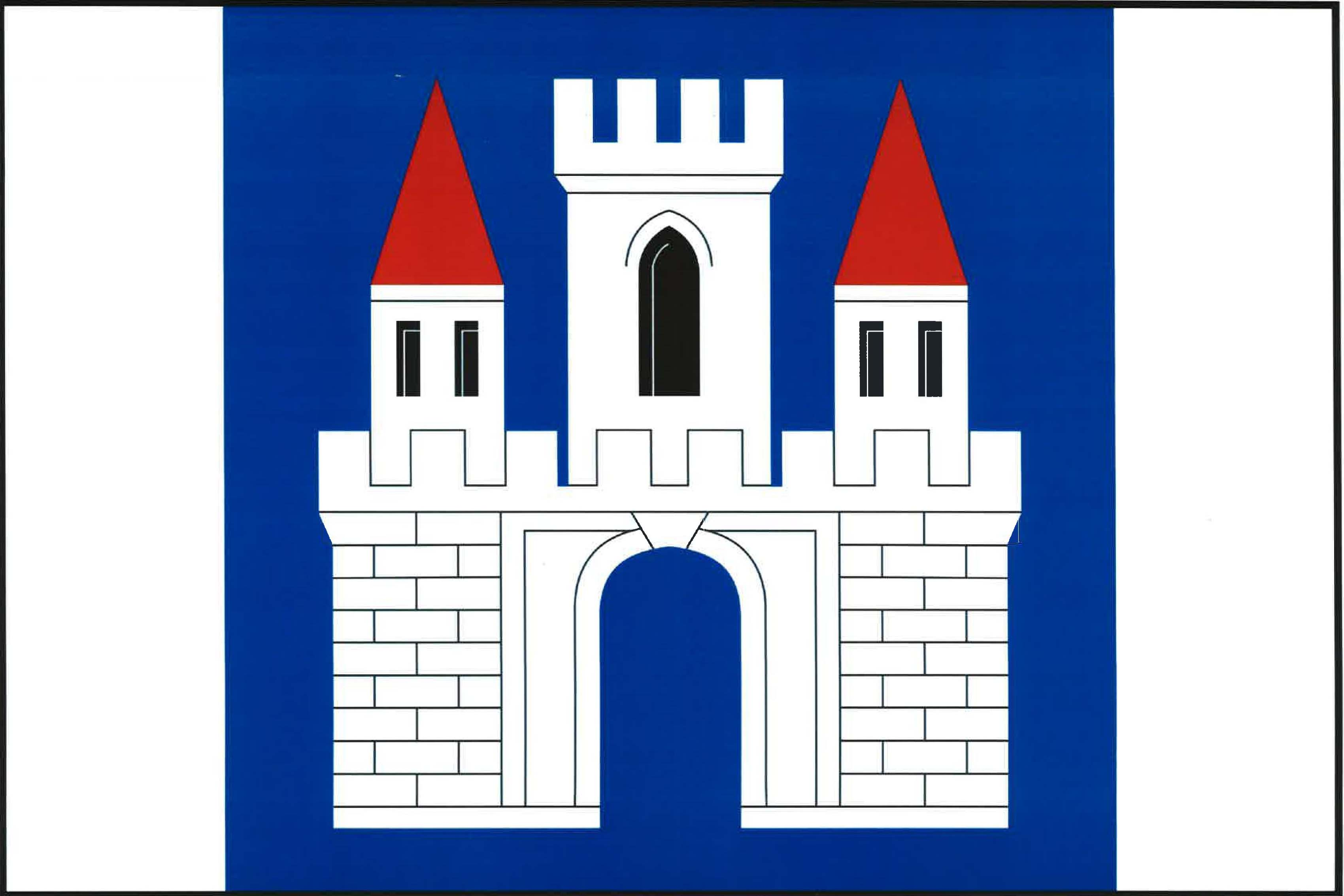
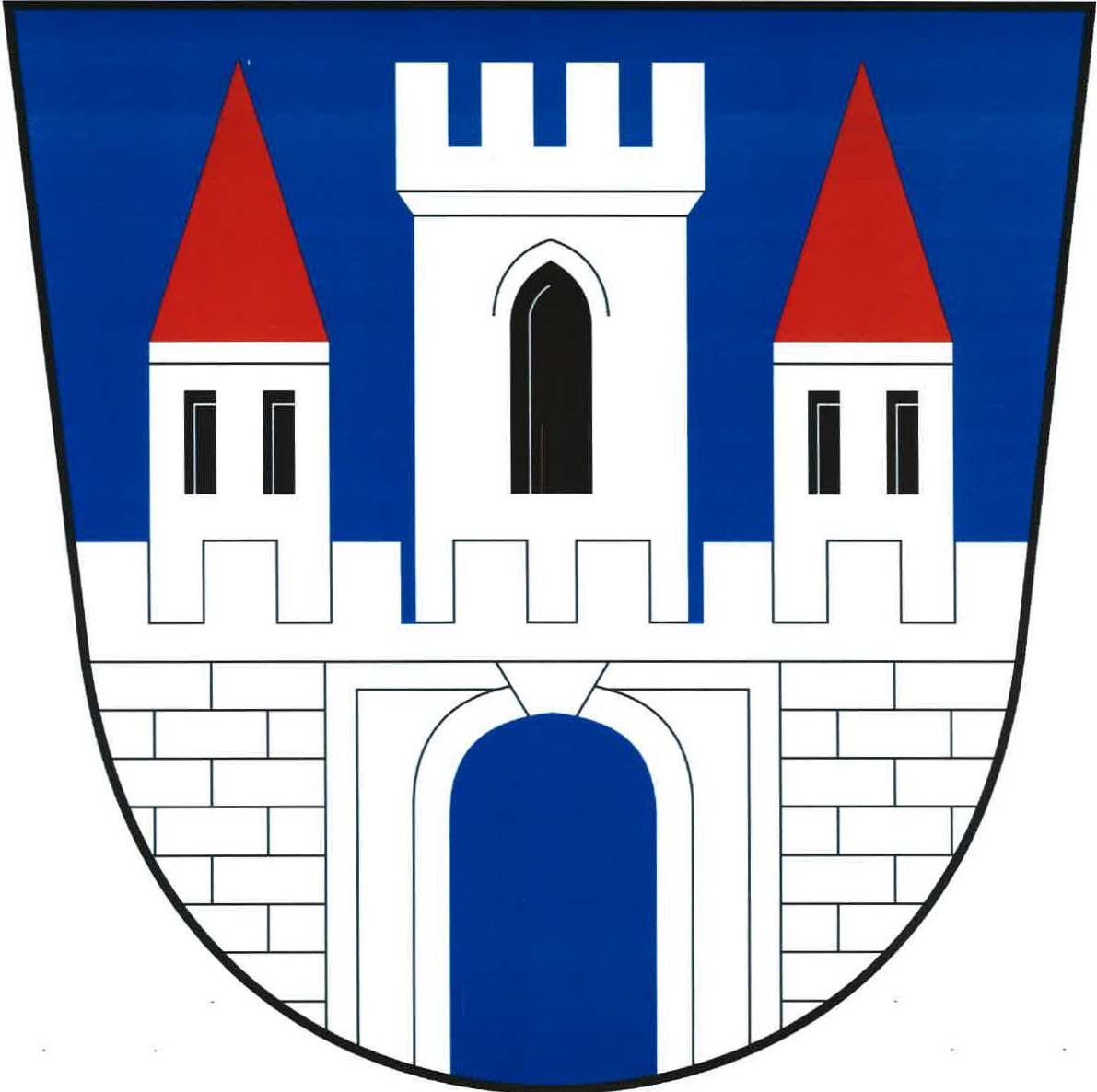
- Flag Coat of arms

- Location in the Czech Republic
- Coordinates: 49°49′54″N 16°2′18″E
- Country: Czech Republic
- Region: Pardubice
- District: Chrudim
- First mentioned: 1325

Area
  - Total: 8.33 km^{2} (3.22 sq mi)
- Elevation: 420 m (1,380 ft)

Population (2026-01-01)
  - Total: 401
  - Density: 48.1/km^{2} (125/sq mi)
- Time zone: UTC+1 (CET)
  - Summer (DST): UTC+2 (CEST)
- Postal codes: 539 73, 539 74
- Website: www.predhradi.cz

Předhradí (until 1950 Rychmburk) is a municipality and village in Chrudim District in the Pardubice Region of the Czech Republic. It has about 400 inhabitants. The historic centre with the Rychmburk Castle is well preserved and is protected as an urban monument zone.

== Administrative division ==
Předhradí consists of two municipal parts (in brackets population according to the 2021 census):

- Předhradí (360)
- Dolívka (1)

== Etymology ==
The historical German name of the local castle was Rychenburg, i.e. 'rich castle'. The name was transcribed into Czech as Rychmburk. The settlement next to the castle was alternatively called Předhradí Rychmburské (lit. 'outer castle area of Rychmburk'). In the 18th century, the settlement was given the name Radyně in an effort to replace the German name with a Czech one.

In 1950, the name of the municipality was changed to Předhradí.

== Geography ==
Předhradí is located about 21 kilometres (13 mi) southeast of Chrudim and 29 km (18 mi) southeast of Pardubice. It lies in an elevated plateau in the Iron Mountains. The highest point is at 506 m (1,660 ft) above sea level. The municipality is situated on the left bank of the Krounka River, which forms the eastern municipal border.

== History ==
Rychmburk Castle was probably built in the early 13th century. In the first half of the 14th century, it was rebuilt and extended. In 1530–1540, it was rebuilt in the Renaissance style. Among its owners belonged the noble families of Waldstein (1500–1555), Berka of Dubá (1555–1709), Kinsky (1718–1823) and Thurn und Taxis (1823–1918).

The first written mention of the settlement of Rychmburk is from 1654.

== Demographics ==
Historical population

Year	Pop.	±%
1869	613	—
1880	636	+3.8%
1890	636	+0.0%
1900	727	+14.3%
1910	687	−5.5%

Year	Pop.	±%
1921	600	−12.7%
1930	557	−7.2%
1950	450	−19.2%
1961	564	+25.3%
1970	506	−10.3%

Year	Pop.	±%
1980	527	+4.2%
1991	495	−6.1%
2001	449	−9.3%
2011	427	−4.9%
2021	361	−15.5%

Source: Censuses

== Transport ==
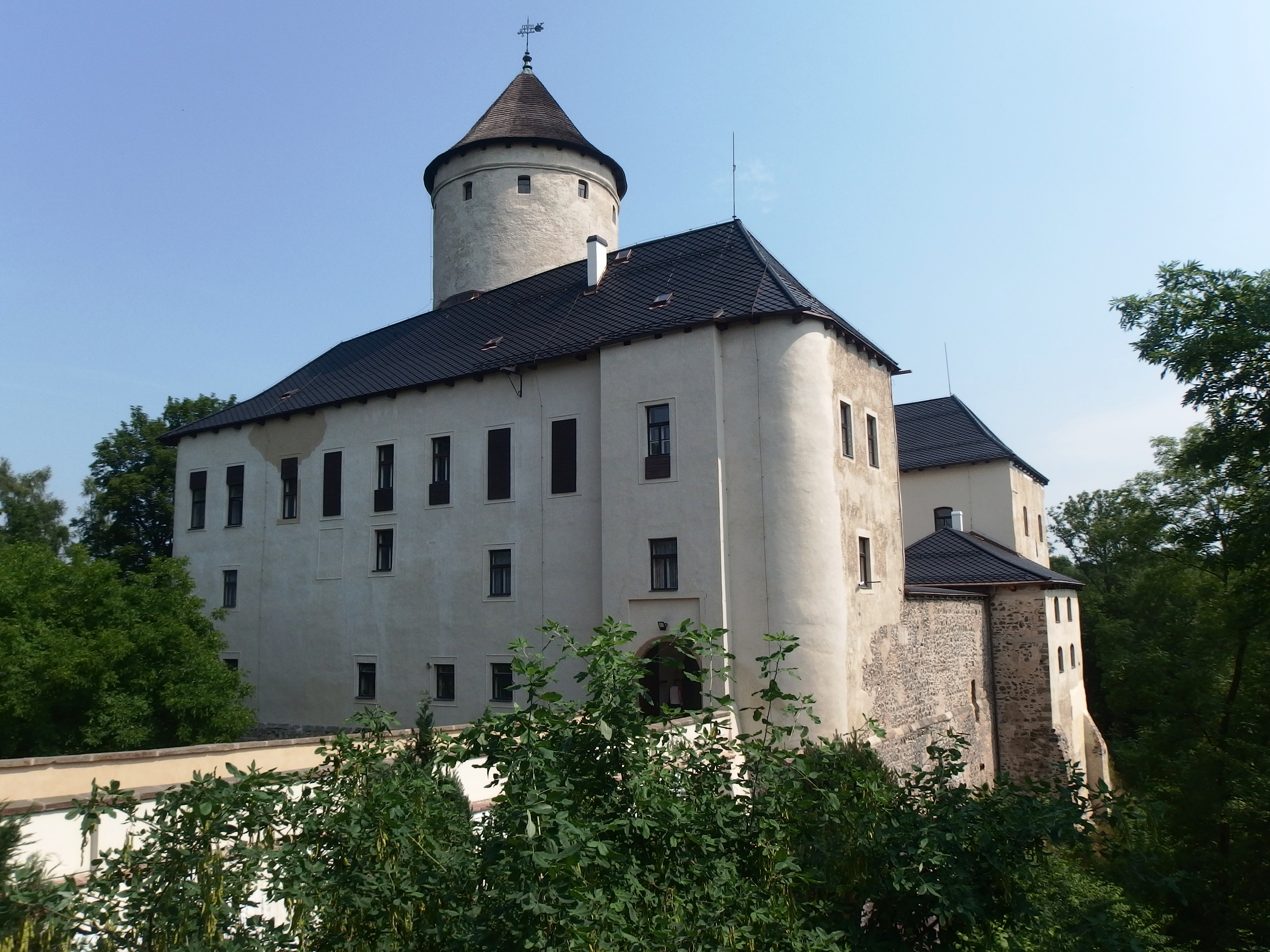
Rychmburk Castle

Předhradí is located on the railway line Svitavy–Žďárec u Skutče.

== Sights ==
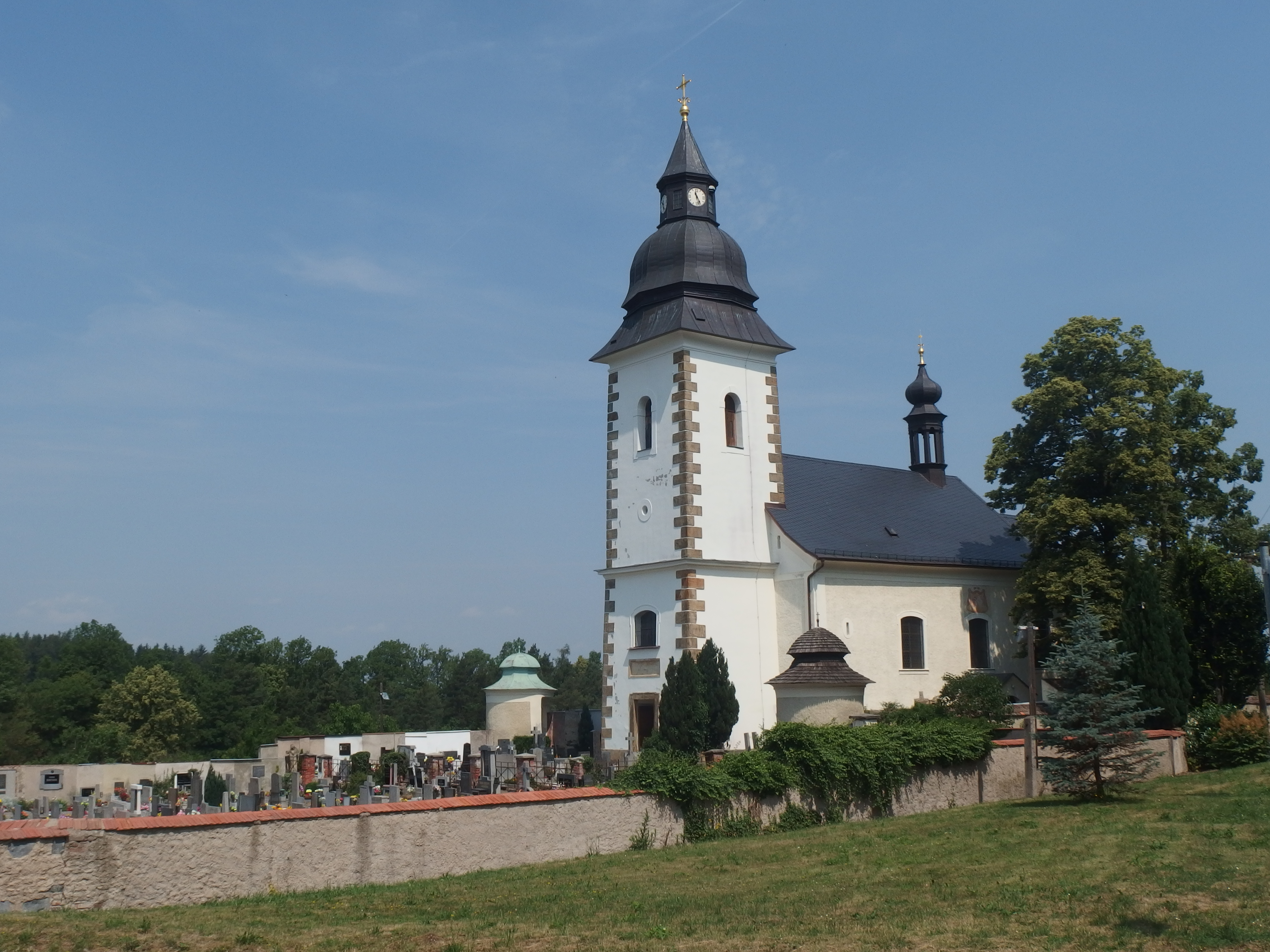
Church of Our Lady of Sorrows

Rychmburk Castle is the main landmark of Předhradí. Today the premises partly serves as retirement house. There are also several expositions (including the permanent exhibition on the history of the castle), a chapel and a concert hall. The castle tower is open to the public.

The main sight of the village is the Church of Our Lady of Sorrows. It was built in 1753. Opposite the church is the manor garden with a gazebo and a bust of Philipp Kinsky (1742–1827), the founder of the garden and the owner of the manor for more than 50 years.

== Notable people ==
- Adolf Heyduk (1835–1923), poet
