= Adolf Heyduk =

Czech poet and writer (1835–1923)

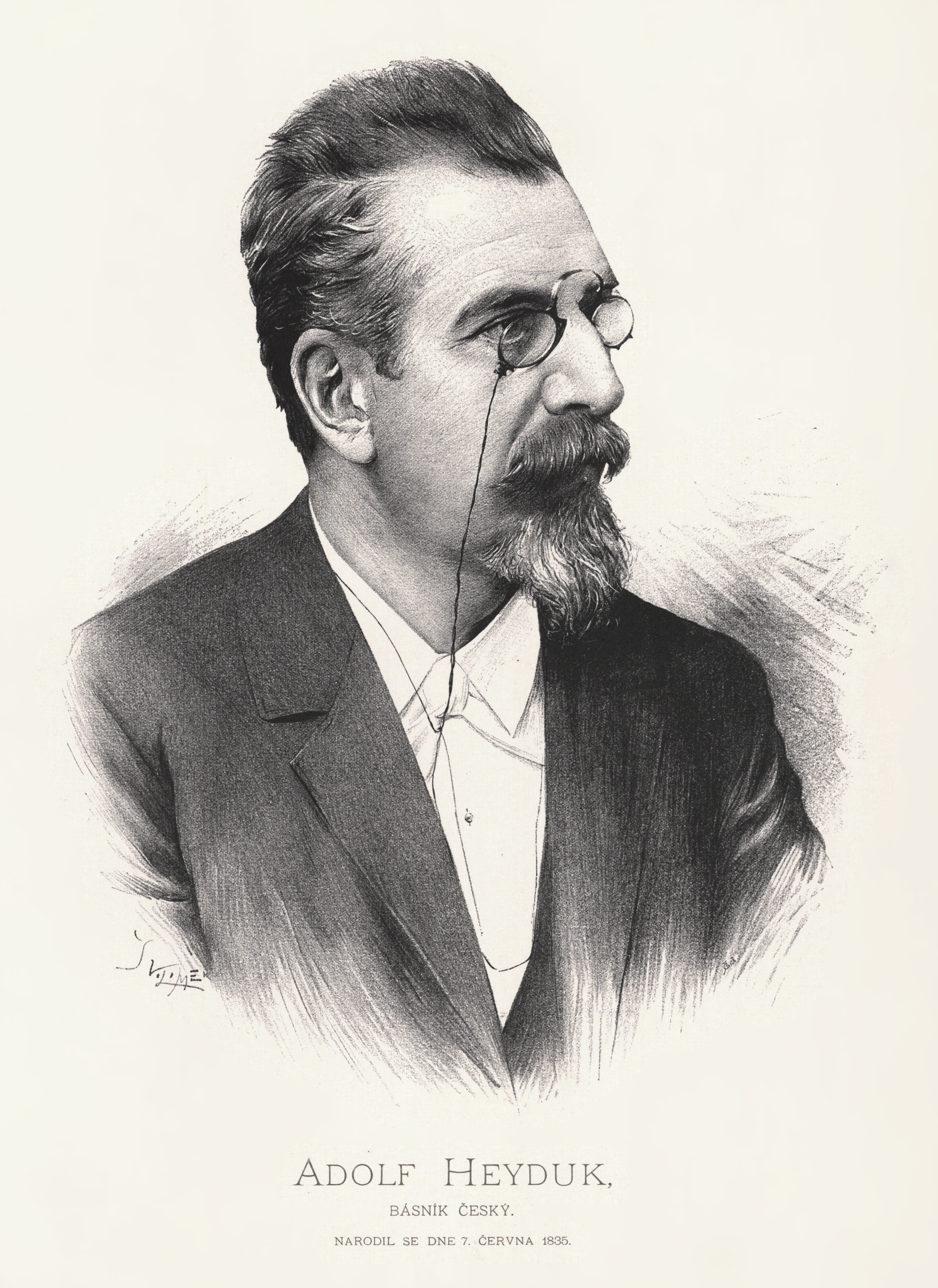
Portrait of Adolf Heyduk by Jan Vilímek

Adolf Heyduk (6 June 1835 – 6 February 1923) was a Czech poet and writer, a representative of the May School.

He is best known internationally because of his poem cycle Gypsy Melodies that were set to music by Antonín Dvořák. The most widely performed is the poignant and tender Songs My Mother Taught Me, included in the repertoire of many instrumentalists and vocalists.

== Life ==
Heyduk was born on 6 June 1835 in Rychmburk, Bohemia, Austrian Empire (today Předhradí, Czech Republic). In 1850, he began his studies at Ječná gymnasium in Prague from which he graduated in 1854. At his parents' request, he studied engineering in Brno for a year and then transferred to Prague Polytechnic. At this time, he met poet Jan Neruda, with whom he established a close friendship. Heyduk finished his studies in 1859 and became a teacher at a gymnasium. In 1860, he moved to Písek to teach drawing and engineering at the local college. He was charmed by the small town and quickly became a native. In 1876, he became the chairman of the literary section of the Umělecká beseda association.

In 1877, he married his student Emílie Reinerová, the daughter of a restaurant owner in Písek. In the following years, he became a father of two daughters. However they both died young. In 1878, his first daughter Jarmila died at the age of three months. His long-time friend Jan Neruda, who was to become her godfather, came to Písek for her christening. However, she died before the baptism, and this tragic event inspired Neruda to write Children Ballads. Heyduk's second daughter, Liduška, died at the age of four in 1884.

Heyduk had a very strong relationship with Slovakia, which he often visited and had many friends there. He also travelled to Italy and the Caucasus, where his nephew, agronomist Jaroslav Hejduk lived.

Adolf Heyduk was the only important poet of Neruda's generation who lived to see an independent Czechoslovak state. In 1920, on the occasion of his 85th birthday, he was personally visited by the president of Czechoslovakia Tomáš Garrigue Masaryk at his apartment in Písek. Heyduk died on 6 February 1923 in Písek and is buried at Vyšehrad Cemetery in Prague.

== Selected works ==
Lyric poetry

- Poems (1859) – contains the cycle Gypsy Melodies
- Karyatidy (1862)
- Poems (1865)
- Lesní kvítí (1873)
- Cymbál a husle (1876)
- V zátiší (1883)
- Písně (1884)
- Hořec a srdečník (1884)
- Zaváté listy (1886)
- Šípy a paprsky (1888)
- Na potulkách (1895)
- Nové cigánské melodie (1897)
- Ptačí motivy (1897)
- Zpěvy pošumavského dudáka (1899)
- Dumy a dojmy (1899)
- Rosa a jíní (1899)
- Parnasie (1900)
- V polích (1900)
- Černá růže (1901)
- Lotyšské motivy (1901)
- Poh.comy duše (1901)
- V samotách (1901)
- Ritornelly (1902)
- Z pouti na Kavkaz (1903)
- Cestou (1903)
- Z deníku toulavého zpěváka (1904)
- Znělky (1905)
- Od Tater a Dunaje (1910)
- Co hlavou táhlo (1910)

Epic poetry

- Dřevorubec
- Dědův .comaz
- Ptačí motivy
