= Loučim =

- Municipality
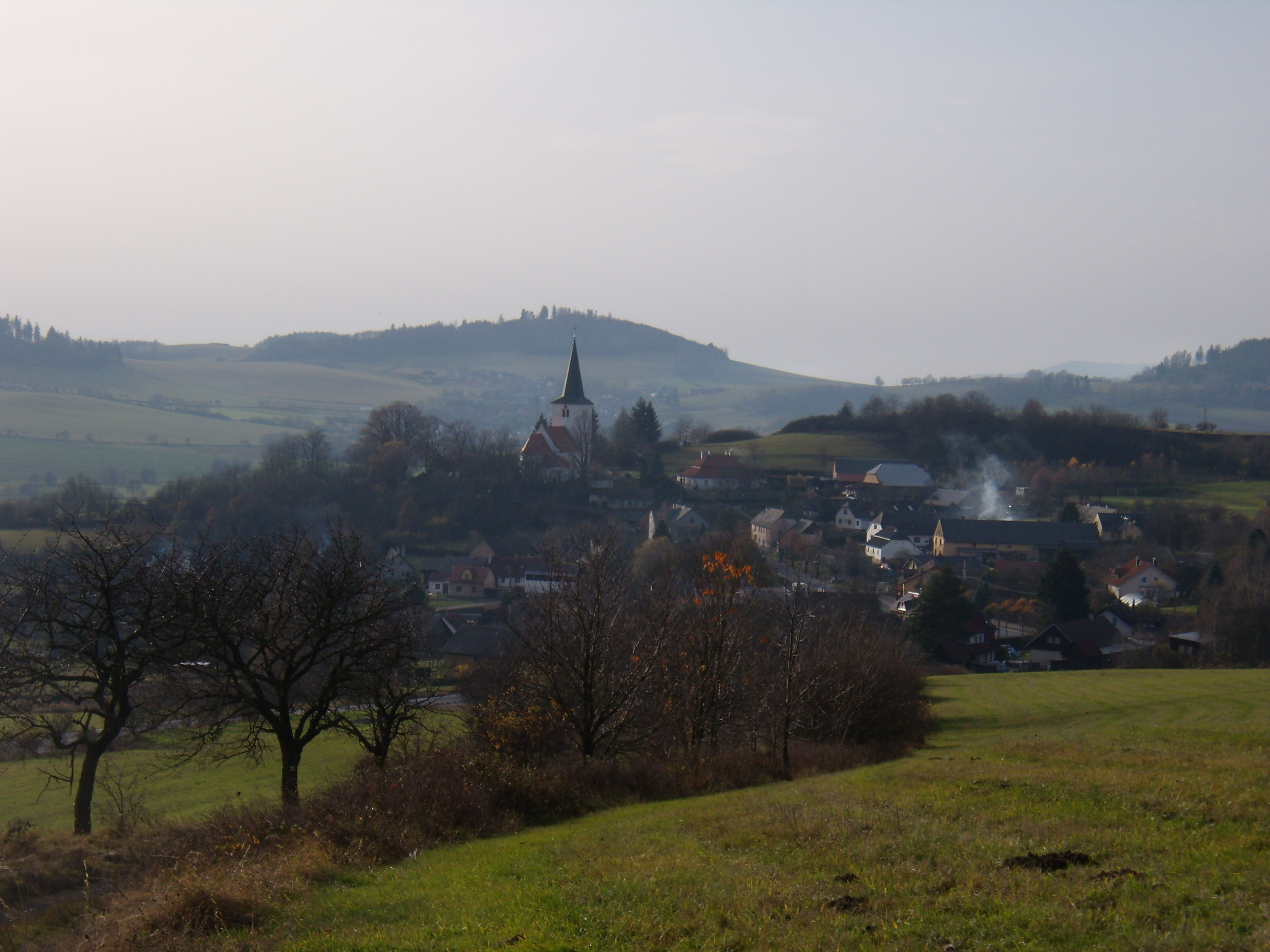
- General view

- Location in the Czech Republic
- Coordinates: 49°22′2″N 13°6′44″E
- Country: Czech Republic
- Region: Plzeň
- District: Domažlice
- First mentioned: 1357

Area
  - Total: 4.26 km^{2} (1.64 sq mi)
- Elevation: 518 m (1,699 ft)

Population (2026-01-01)
  - Total: 117
  - Density: 27.5/km^{2} (71.1/sq mi)
- Time zone: UTC+1 (CET)
  - Summer (DST): UTC+2 (CEST)
- Postal code: 345 06
- Website: www.loucim.cz

Loučim (German: Lautschim) is a municipality and village in Domažlice District in the Plzeň Region of the Czech Republic. It has about 100 inhabitants.

== Geography ==
Loučim is located about 15 kilometres (9 mi) southeast of Domažlice and 45 km (28 mi) southwest of Plzeň. It lies mostly in the Švihov Highlands. The southern part of the municipal territory extends in to the Cham-Furth Depression. The highest point is the hill Černá skála at 731 m (2,398 ft) above sea level.

== History ==
The first written mention of Loučim is from 1357. Throughout its history, the village was owned by various lower noble families.

== Demographics ==
Historical population

Year	Pop.	±%
1869	419	—
1880	381	−9.1%
1890	341	−10.5%
1900	334	−2.1%
1910	310	−7.2%

Year	Pop.	±%
1921	304	−1.9%
1930	239	−21.4%
1950	189	−20.9%
1961	185	−2.1%
1970	123	−33.5%

Year	Pop.	±%
1980	143	+16.3%
1991	131	−8.4%
2001	124	−5.3%
2011	127	+2.4%
2021	123	−3.1%

Source: Censuses

== Transport ==
The I/22 road (the section from Klatovy to Domažlice) runs through the municipality.

== Sights ==
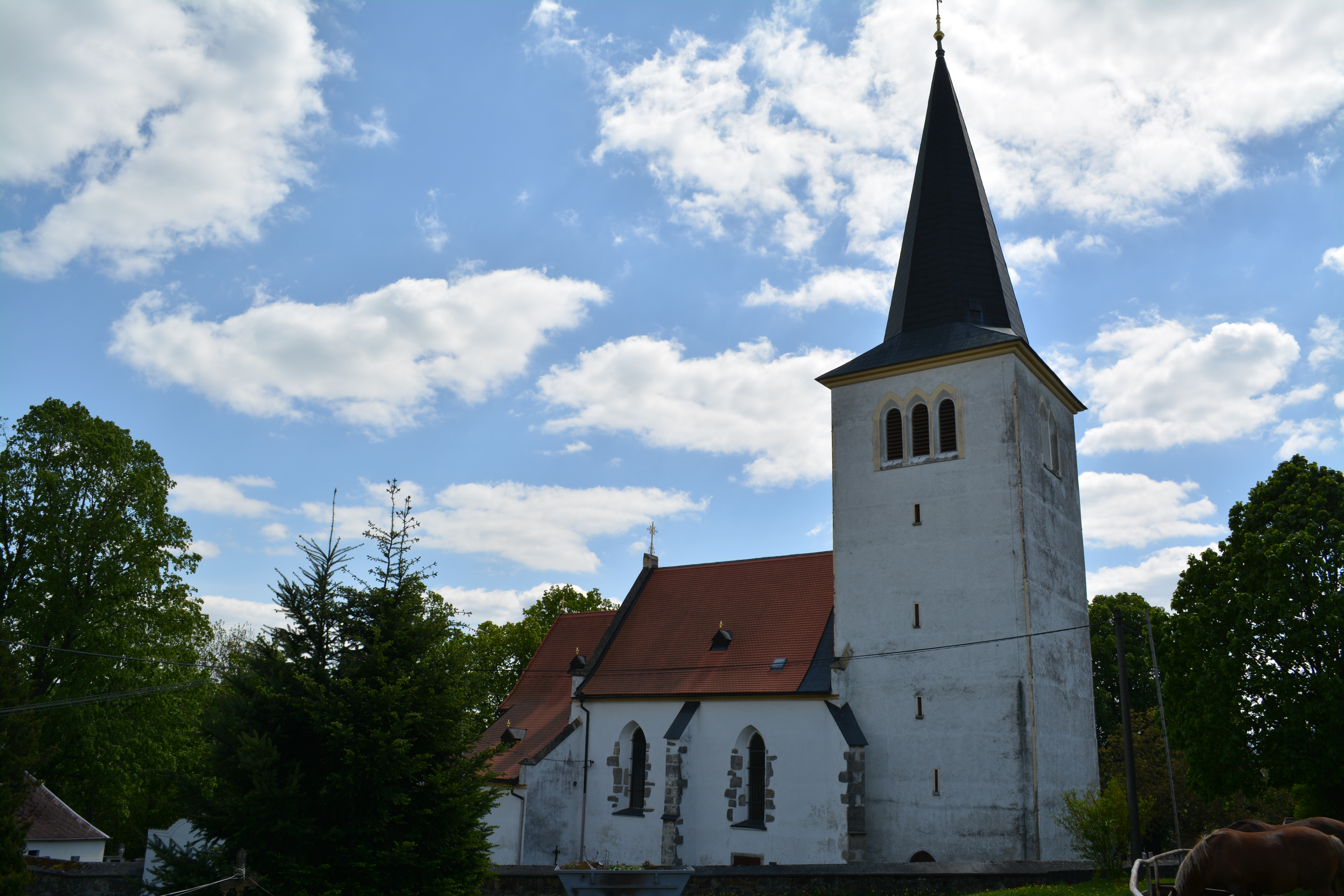
Church of the Nativity of the Virgin Mary

The main landmark of Loučim is the Church of the Nativity of the Virgin Mary. It was built in the Gothic style in the mid-14th century. In the 16th century, it was rebuilt in the Renaissance style and the tower was added. In 1760 and 1770, it was modified in the Baroque style.
