= Josef Barák =

Czech politician, journalist (1833–1883)

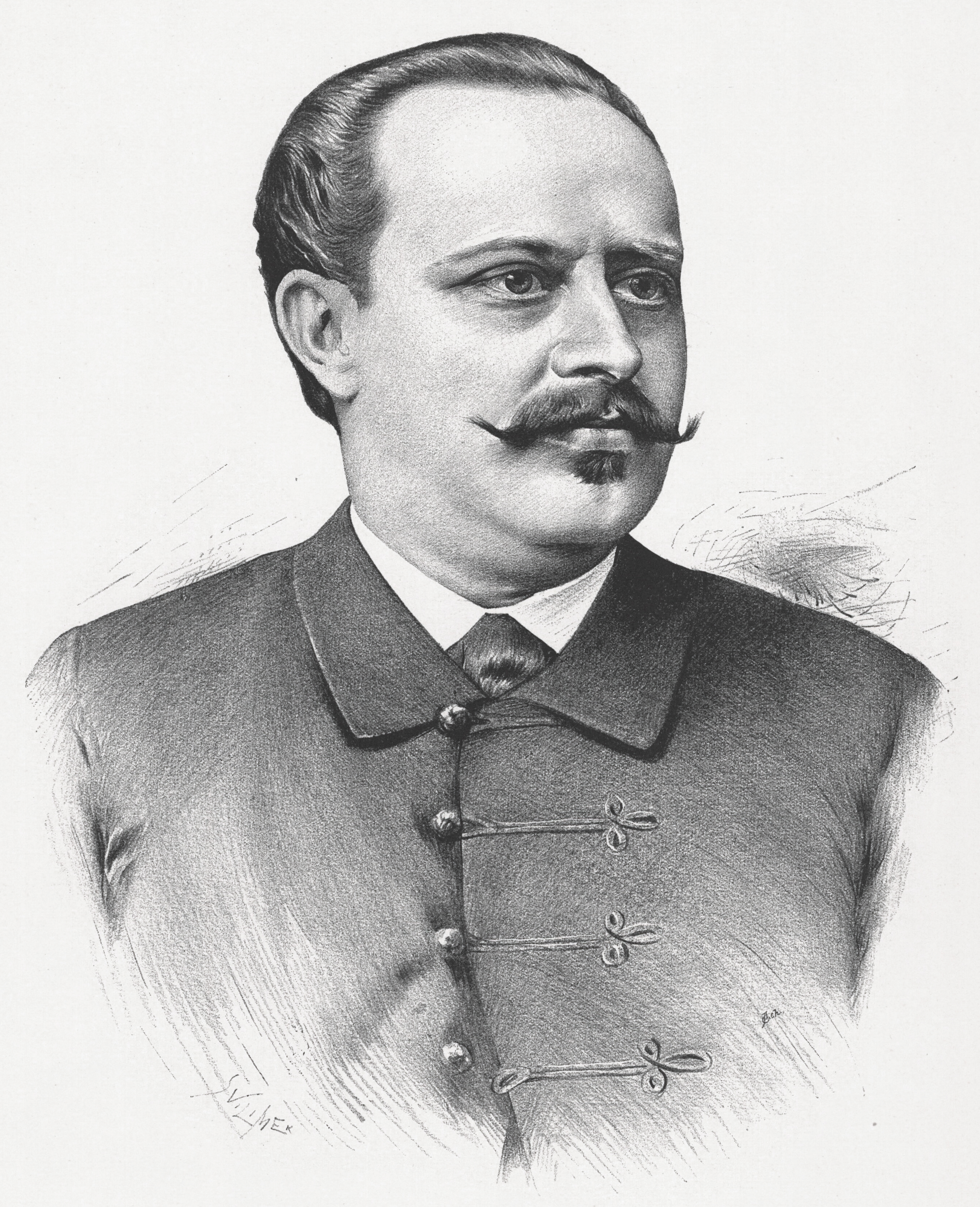
Portrail of Josef Barák by Jan Vilímek

Josef Barák (26 January 1833 in Prague – 15 November 1883 in Prague) was a Czech politician, journalist and poet. He was a member of the Májovci literary group. He became close with Jindřich Fügner; Fügner sent money to Barák when the latter was imprisoned in 1860. According to Fügner's daughter, it was the first time her father supported a Czech cause.

From 1867 to 1873, Barák published the fortnightly newspaper Svoboda ('Freedom') in Prague.

== See also ==
- List of Czech writers
