= Rudolf Mayer =

Czech poet

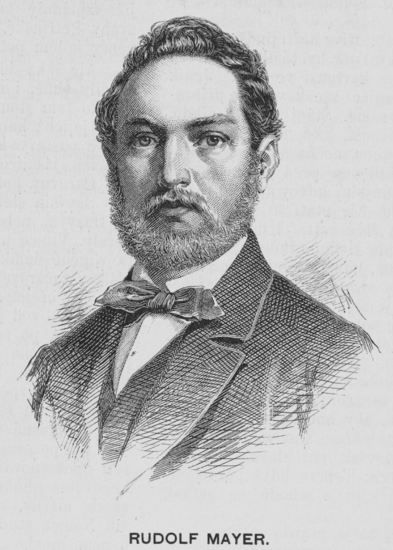
- Portrait by Josef Mukařovský
- Born: 13 October 1837; Skránčice, Bohemia, Austrian Empire
- Died: 12 August 1865 (aged 27); Loučim, Bohemia, Austrian Empire
- Occupation: Writer

Rudolf Mayer (13 October 1837 – 12 August 1865) was a Czech poet. He was a member of the Májovci group of Czech novelists, and poets and is best known for his poem "Midday" ("V poledne").
