= Karlovice (Semily District) =

- Municipality
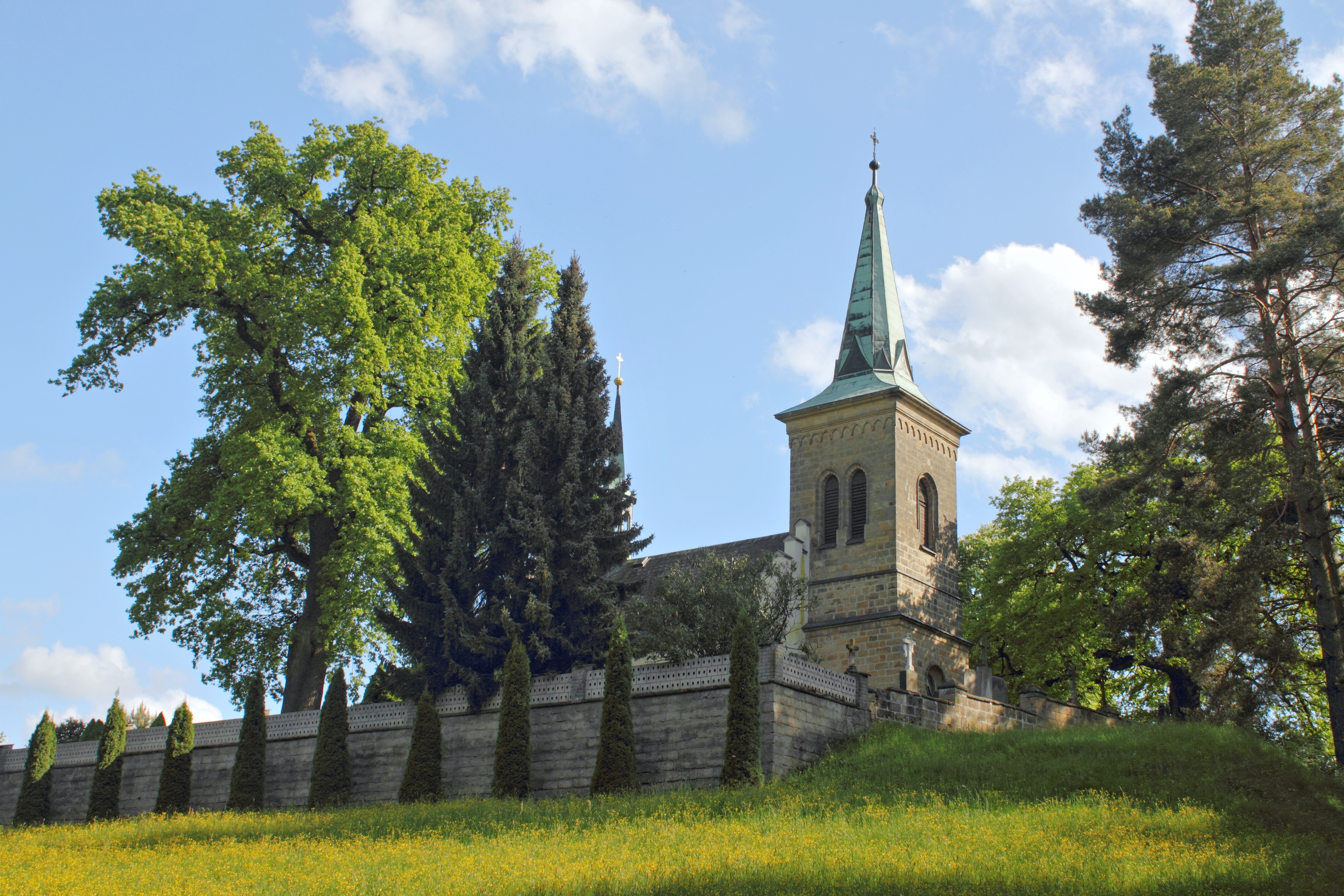
- Church of Saint George

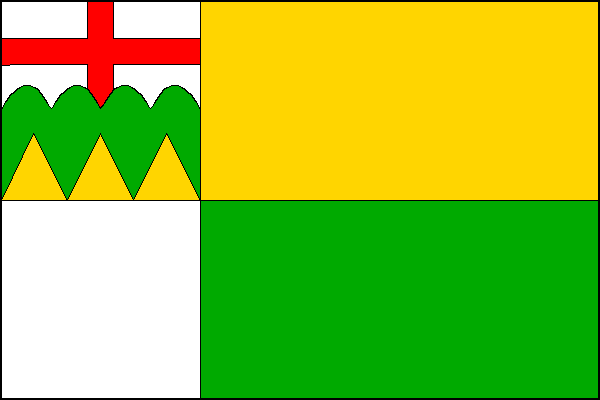
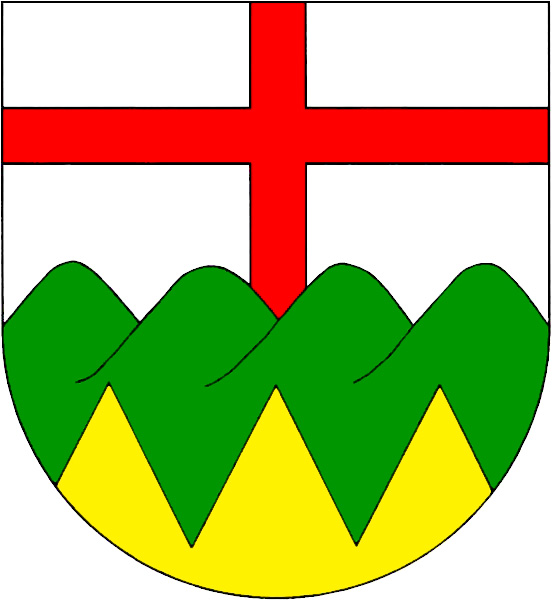
- Flag Coat of arms

- Location in the Czech Republic
- Coordinates: 50°33′46″N 15°12′41″E
- Country: Czech Republic
- Region: Liberec
- District: Semily
- First mentioned: 1543

Area
  - Total: 10.22 km^{2} (3.95 sq mi)
- Elevation: 284 m (932 ft)

Population (2026-01-01)
  - Total: 885
  - Density: 86.6/km^{2} (224/sq mi)
- Time zone: UTC+1 (CET)
  - Summer (DST): UTC+2 (CEST)
- Postal code: 511 01
- Website: www.karlovice-sedmihorky.cz

Karlovice (German: Karlowitz) is a municipality and village in Semily District in the Liberec Region of the Czech Republic. It has about 900 inhabitants.

== Administrative division ==
Karlovice consists of five municipal parts (in brackets population according to the 2021 census):

- Karlovice (47)
- Radvánovice (364)
- Roudný (85)
- Sedmihorky (194)
- Svatoňovice (83)

== Demographics ==
Historical population
Year	Pop.	±%
1869	942	—
1880	962	+2.1%
1890	994	+3.3%
1900	935	−5.9%
1910	947	+1.3%
1921	945	−0.2%
1930	1,029	+8.9%
1950	846	−17.8%
1961	749	−11.5%
1970	720	−3.9%
1980	666	−7.5%
1991	665	−0.2%
2001	672	+1.1%
2011	713	+6.1%
2021	773	+8.4%
Source: Censuses
