= Evensong (disambiguation) =

Evensong is the common name for a Christian church service originating in the Anglican tradition as part of the reformed practice of the Daily Office or canonical hours.

Evensong may also refer to:

== Religion ==
- Evening Prayer (Anglican), the Anglican liturgy of Evening Prayer, especially (but not exclusively) so called when it is sung
- Evensong (Unitarian Universalist Association), a programmed series of gatherings organized by the Unitarian Universalist Association

== Entertainment and media ==
- Evensong, a 1933 novel by Beverley Nichols
- Evensong, a 1933 Broadway play adaptation of Nichols novel, produced by Archibald Selwyn
- Evensong (film), the 1934 British musical adaptation of Beverly Nichols' novel
- "Evensong (short story)", a 1967 short story by Lester del Rey which appeared in Harlan Ellison's anthology Dangerous Visions
- Evensong, a 1999 novel by Gail Godwin
- Evensong (album), a 1970 album by Amazing Blondel
- "Evensong", a song by Robert Fripp and Brian Eno from their 1975 album Evening Star
- "Evensong", a song by Halou from their album Halou (2008)
- "Evensong", a song by The Innocence Mission from their album Umbrella (1991)
- "Evensong", a song by Yes from their album Union (1991)
- "Evensong", a song by Sarah Davachi from her 2018 album Gave In Rest

== See also ==
- Even Song (disambiguation)
