= Lhota (Přerov District) =

- Municipality
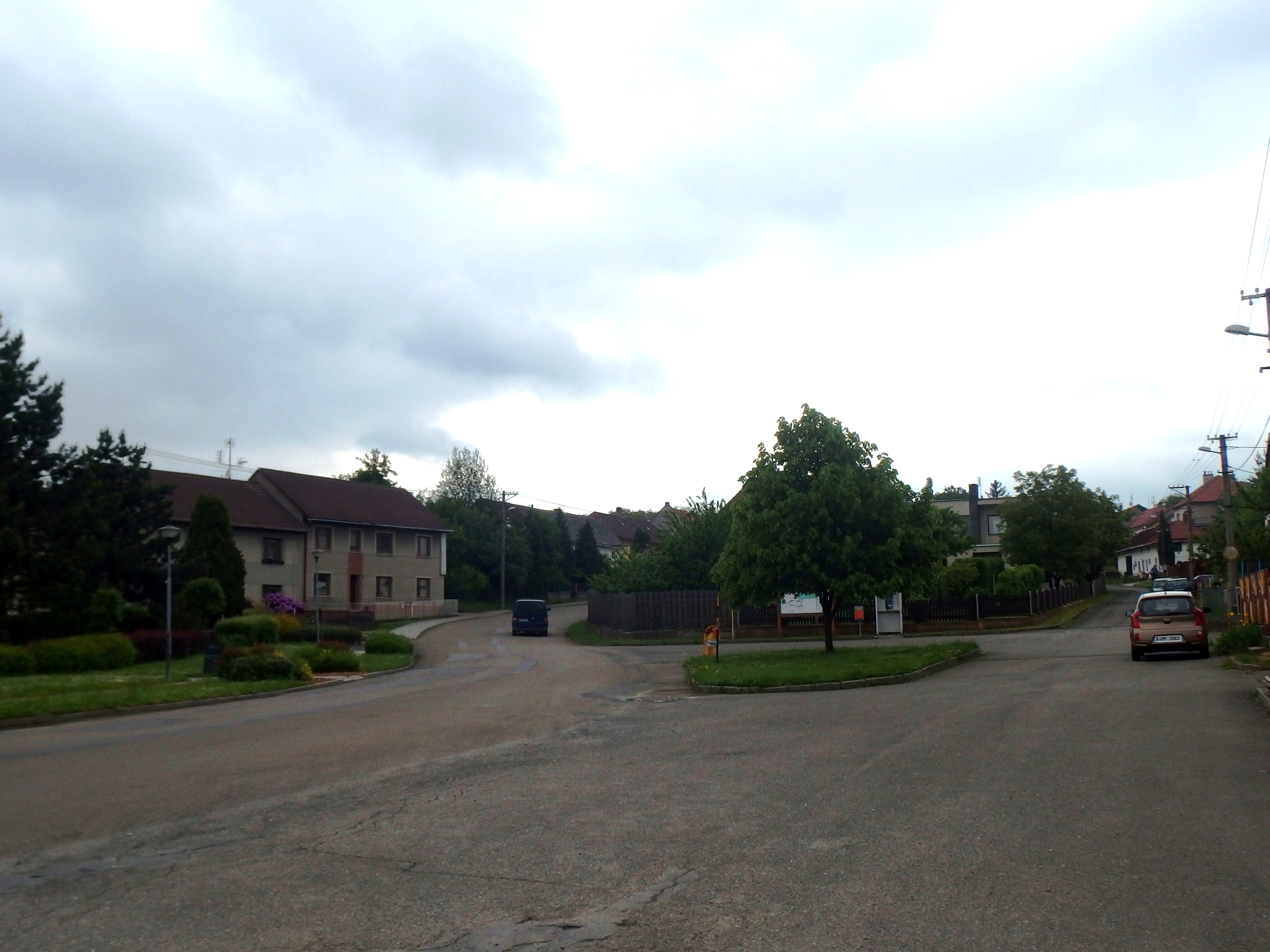
- Centre of Lhota

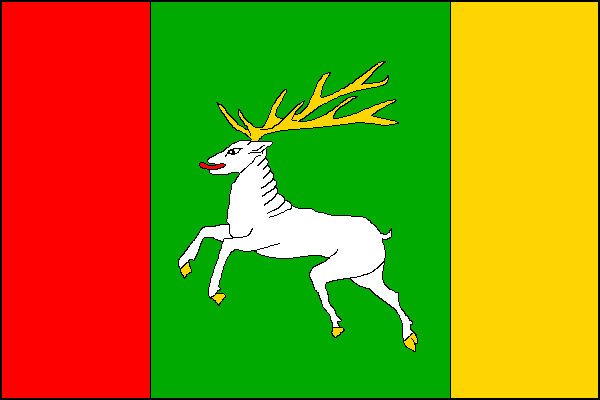
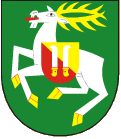
- Flag Coat of arms

- Location in the Czech Republic
- Coordinates: 49°29′52″N 17°36′53″E
- Country: Czech Republic
- Region: Olomouc
- District: Přerov
- First mentioned: 1346

Area
  - Total: 3.24 km^{2} (1.25 sq mi)
- Elevation: 340 m (1,120 ft)

Population (2026-01-01)
  - Total: 342
  - Density: 106/km^{2} (273/sq mi)
- Time zone: UTC+1 (CET)
  - Summer (DST): UTC+2 (CEST)
- Postal code: 751 31
- Website: www.lhotaulipnika.cz

Lhota is a municipality and village in Přerov District in the Olomouc Region of the Czech Republic. It has about 300 inhabitants.

Lhota lies approximately 13 kilometres (8 mi) north-east of Přerov, 29 km (18 mi) east of Olomouc, and 239 km (149 mi) east of Prague.

== Demographics ==
Historical population
Year	Pop.	±%
1869	328	—
1880	360	+9.8%
1890	351	−2.5%
1900	321	−8.5%
1910	373	+16.2%
1921	362	−2.9%
1930	388	+7.2%
1950	399	+2.8%
1961	420	+5.3%
1970	383	−8.8%
1980	406	+6.0%
1991	342	−15.8%
2001	327	−4.4%
2011	306	−6.4%
2021	298	−2.6%
Source: Censuses
