= Vítězslav Hálek =

Czech poet, publicist and writer

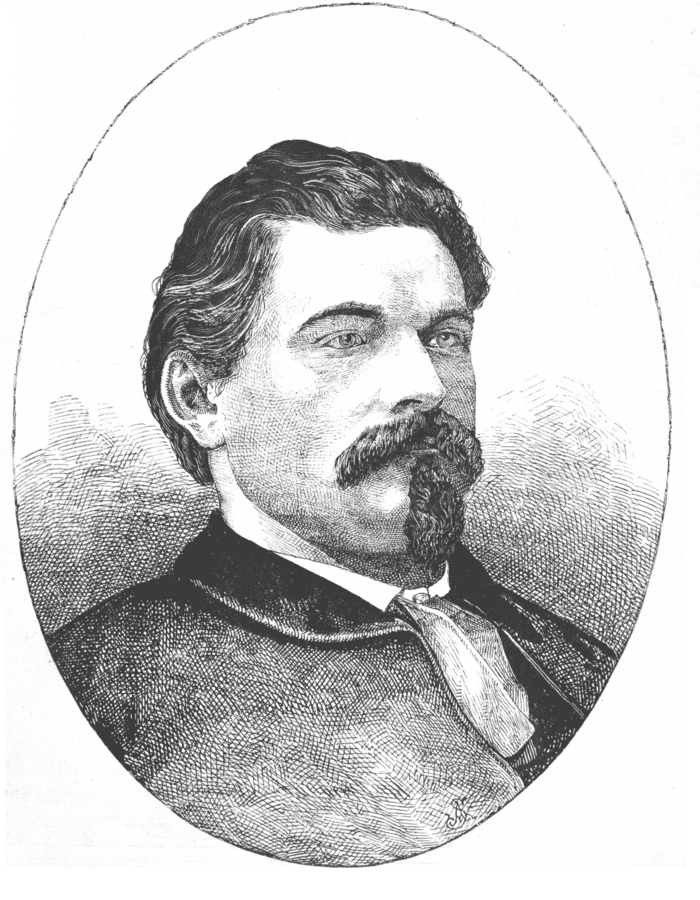
- Born: 5 April 1835; Dolínek, Bohemia, Austrian Empire
- Died: 8 October 1874 (aged 39); Prague, Bohemia, Austria-Hungary
- Resting place: Vyšehrad Cemetery, Prague
- Occupation: Poet
- Writing career
- Notable works: Večerní písně Pohádky z naší vesnice

Vítězslav Hálek (also known as Vincenc Hálek; Czech pronunciation: [ˈviːcɛslaf ˈɦaːlɛk]; 5 April 1835 – 8 October 1874) was a Czech poet, writer, journalist and dramatist. He was known for his optimistic work, which earned him fame and recognition during his lifetime.

== Life ==
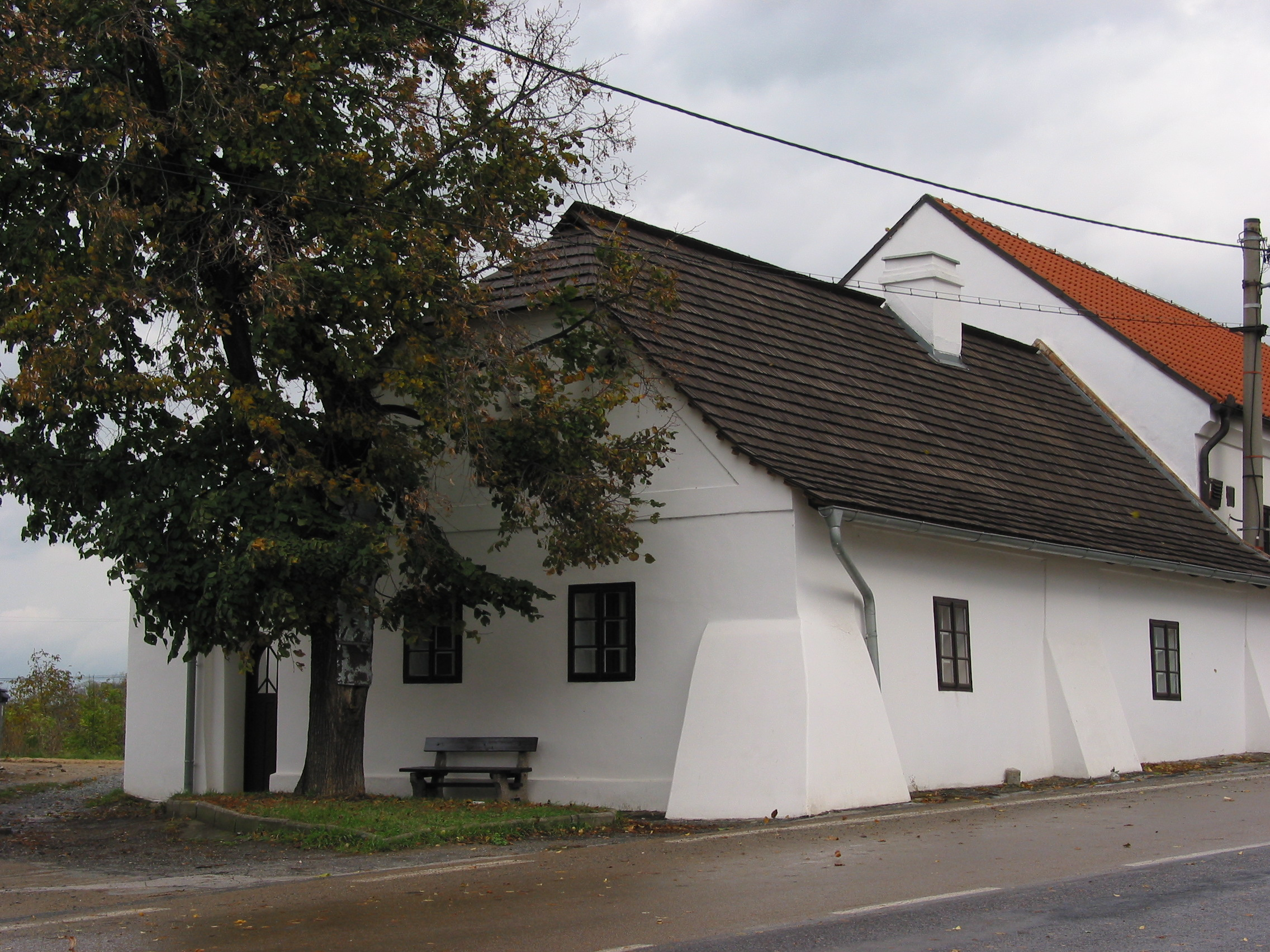
Birth house in Dolínek

Vítězslav Hálek was born on 5 April 1835 in Dolínek, Bohemia, Austrian Empire (today part of Odolena Voda in the Czech Republic). In 1841–1842, he lived in Zálezlice.

After completing his studies at a gymnasium in Prague, Hálek refused to go on to study at seminary and went to study philosophy. However, he did not finish his philosophical studies and instead decided to become a writer. He earned money for his studies as a private tutor in the wealthy family of lawyer Horáček, where he met Dorotea Horáčková (1843–1907). She became his inspiration for writing love poems. After a ten-year relationship, he married her and thus stopped having money problems. They had two sons together. The older one died shortly after birth, and the younger one, Ivan, became a renowned physician.

In 1874, Hálek caught a cold on a walking trip to the Mumlava Waterfall. He died of pneumonia in Prague on 8 October 1874, at the age of 39. He is buried at the Vyšehrad Cemetery.

== Work ==
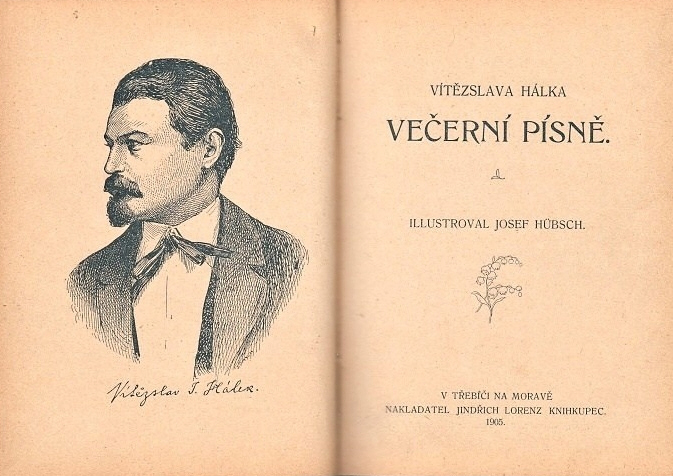
Cover and back of Večerní písně, 1905 edition

Hálek is considered one of the most important representatives of the Májovci literary group, along with Jan Neruda. In his time, his writing was very popular because it was optimistic, relaxed and easy to read. However, after his death he was criticized for the fact that his work often lacks depth of thought. In modern times, the timelessness of his themes is positively assessed and he is ranked among the leading poets in Czech literary history.

The first Hálek's work that caught the public's attention was the lyrical-epic romantic work Alfréd (1858). In 1859, he published his most famous work, a collection of lyrical love poems Večerní písně ('Evening Songs'). Beginning in 1861, he worked as an editor in Národní listy, later helping publish newspapers and journals (Lumír, Květy and also Zlatá Praha, which he founded). Hálek occasionally wrote theatre criticism. Hálek also wrote several dramas, but they were not successful, and therefore he did not even finish his last drama.

=== Notable works ===
- Alfréd, 1858
- Večerní písně ('Evening Songs'), 1859
- Muzikantská Liduška, 1861 (short story, basis for the eponymous 1940 film)
- V přírodě ('In the Nature'), 1872
- Pohádky z naší vesnice ('Fairy Tales From Our Village'), 1874
- Antonín Dvořák, Vítězslav Hálek: The Heirs of the White Mountain, Op. 30, B 134

== Honours and legacy ==
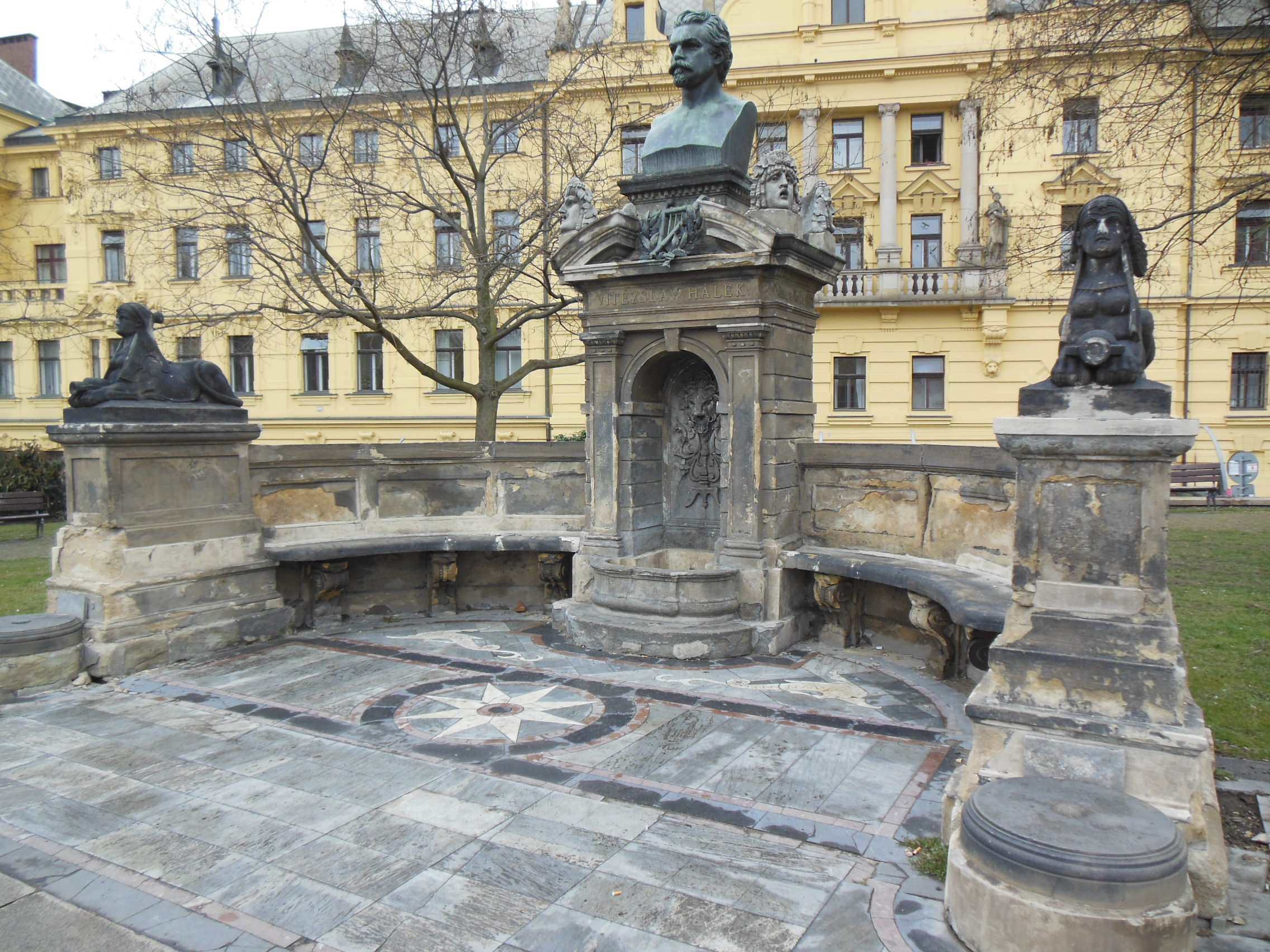
Vítězslav Hálek Memorial in Prague

There are three notable memorials of Vítězslav Hálek in the Czech Republic, considered to be high-quality works of art. One of them is located on Charles Square, the largest square in Prague. The creation was commissioned by the Umělecká beseda association and it was created by Bohuslav Schnirch in 1881. It consists of a bust of Hálek, a fountain and two stone benches with sculptures of lying sphinxes.

One of the memorials in located in Dolní Břežany-Lhota, in the immediate vicinity of the Zbraslav district of Prague where Hálek lived. It was created by Josef Václav Myslbek in 1876.

The memorial in Hálek's native village of Dolínek was created by František Vobořil in 1884–1885. It stands near the birth house of Hálek, which contains an exposition on his life and work. There is also a memorial plaque on the house, unveiled in 1878.

Dozens of cities and towns in the Czech Republic have a street named after Vítězslav Hálek, including Prague (New Town), Brno, Ostrava, Plzeň, Liberec, Olomouc, České Budějovice and Hradec Králové.
