= Jan Neruda =

Czech poet, theater reviewer, publicist, journalist and writer

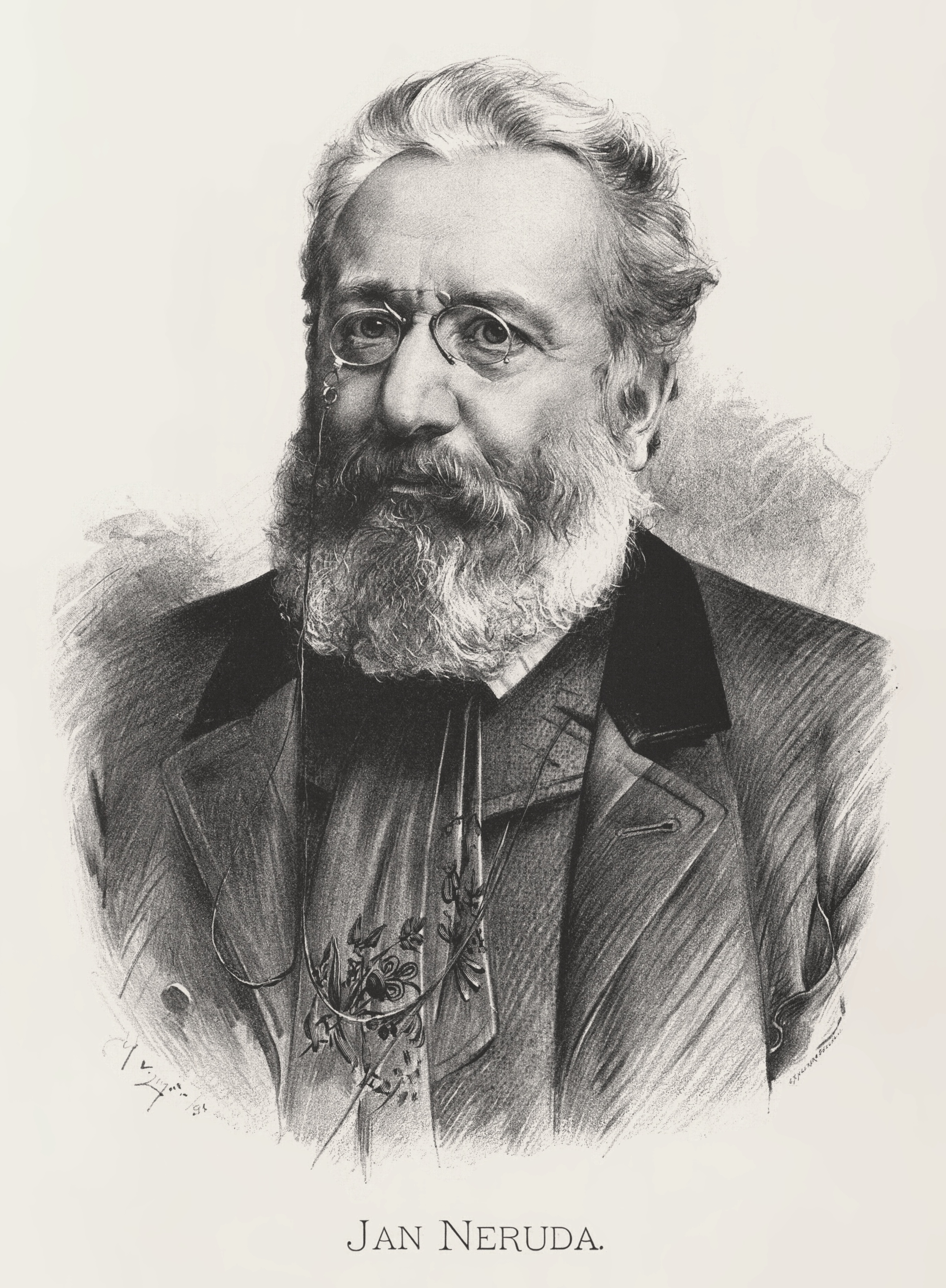
- Portrait by Jan Vilímek
- Born: Jan Nepomuk Neruda; 10 July 1834; Prague, Austrian Empire
- Died: 22 August 1891 (aged 57); Prague, Austria-Hungary
- Resting place: Vyšehrad Cemetery
- Occupations: Poet, journalist
- Spouse: Anna Holinová
- Partner: Karolína Světlá
- Writing career
- Genre: Literary realism
- Notable work: Povídky malostranské
- Movement: May school

Jan Nepomuk Neruda (Czech: [ˈjan ˈnɛpomuk ˈnɛruda]; 10 July 1834 – 22 August 1891) was a Czech journalist, writer, poet and art critic; one of the most prominent representatives of Czech Realism and a member of the "May School".

== Early life ==
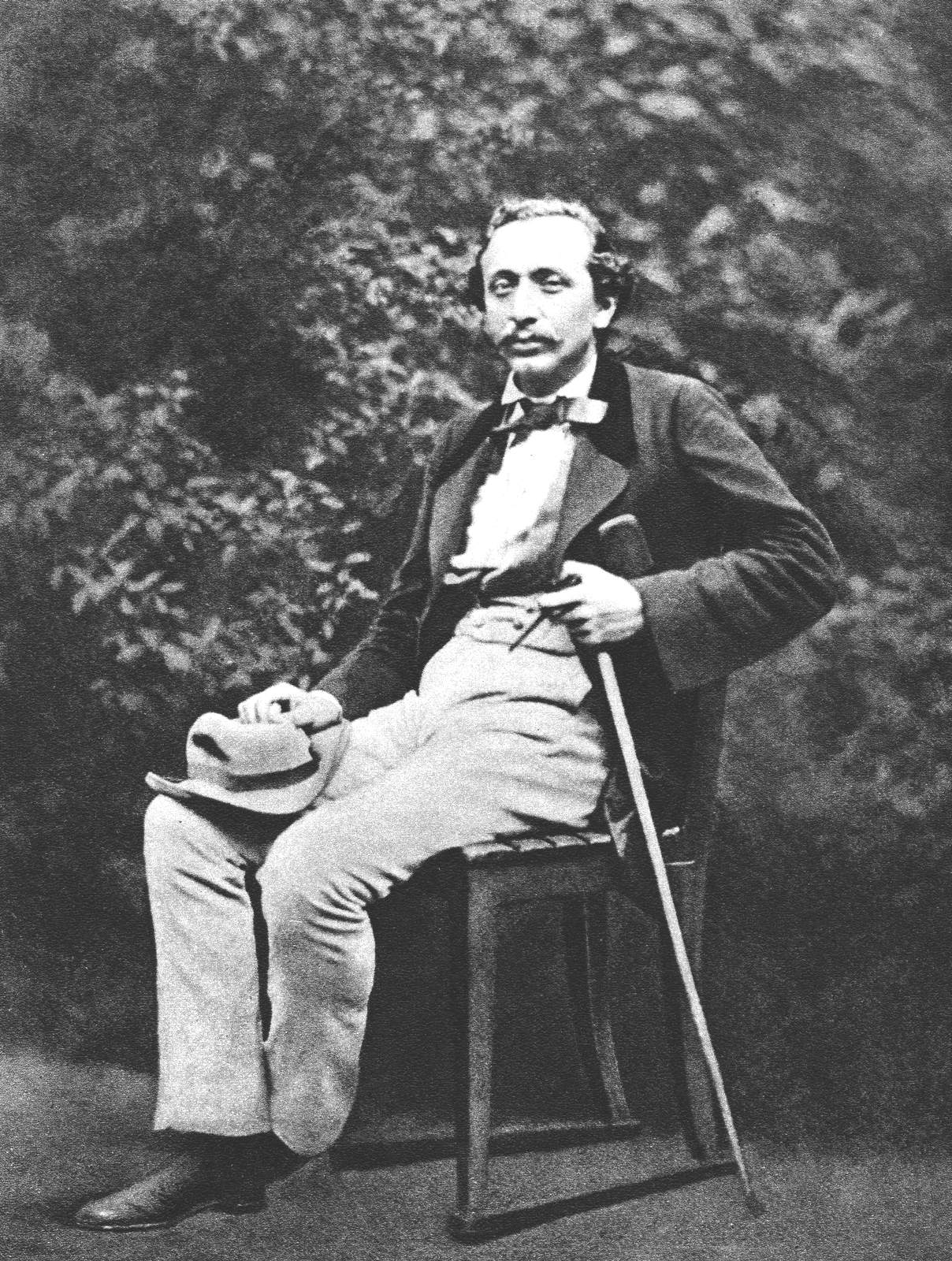
A young Neruda (date unknown)

Jan Neruda was born in Prague, Bohemia. He was son of a small grocer who lived in the Malá Strana district. They lived in Újezd Street and from 1836 to 1838, they lived in Zásmuky, where Jan's father was born. When he was four, they moved to Ostruhová Street (now called Nerudova Street in his honor), where they owned a house known as "U Dvou slunců" (At the Two Suns).

His studies began in 1845 at the local Grammar school then, in 1850, continued at the Academic Grammar School in Clementinum. His favourite writers at the time were Heine, Byron, Shakespeare, Karel Hynek Mácha and Václav Bolemír Nebeský.

After graduation he tried to study law, but he failed. He worked as a clerk for a short time, but was unhappy, so he decided to study philosophy and philology at Charles University. He then worked as a teacher until 1860, when he became a freelance journalist and writer.

He started his career at Národní listy (National Sheets). Later, he worked for Obrazy života (Pictures of Life) and Čas (Time). He also contributed to Květy (Blossoms) and Lumír.

He became the de facto leader of a generation of writers that included Karolina Světlá, Vítězslav Hálek, Adolf Heyduk and Karel Sabina; devoted to continuing the legacy of Karel Hynek Mácha. They published their works in the literary almanac Máj.

By 1871, various groups had labeled Neruda as a "Traitor to the Nation", so he decided to spend some time away; visiting Italy, Greece, France, Germany, Hungary and Egypt. He kept detailed records of these journeys, which provide an interesting testimony to his life and times, with various insights that prove him to be a good observer.

From 1883 to his death he lived on Vladislavova Street 1382/14 in New Town, Prague.

== Personal life ==
Neruda was a loner and an introvert, although he was a friend of composer Bedřich Smetana.

Neruda never married, but he had close relationships with Anna Holinová and Karolína Světlá.

Holinová was his first love. Many of his poems were meant for her. Through her father, Neruda was able to meet Božena Němcová and Karel Jaromír Erben, famous Czech nationalist writers.

His second love was Světlá, a married woman who was also a writer. They supported each other emotionally with their works. She also supported him financially. When he found himself deeply in debt, she sold a precious brooch and lent him the money. Unfortunately her husband, Petr Mužák, found out about it and forced him to give up the relationship. He also had to give him all the letters they had written to each other. These letters became the source for the movie called Příběh lásky a cti (The Story of Love and Honor). Throughout his life, the poet had been in material need, although he was an extremely prolific and respected journalist. Once a week, for example, he wrote a column for the National Papers, worked as a theater officer and literary critic, and edited several popular science journals.

He had a close relationship with his mother. Her death in 1869 greatly affected him and brought a sadder tone to his works.

== Career ==
In his work, Neruda supported the Czech National Revival and promoted Czech nationalism. He participated in all the central cultural and political struggles of his generation, and gained a reputation as a sensitive critic. Neruda became, along with Vítězslav Hálek, one of the most prominent representatives of the new literary trends.

== Death ==
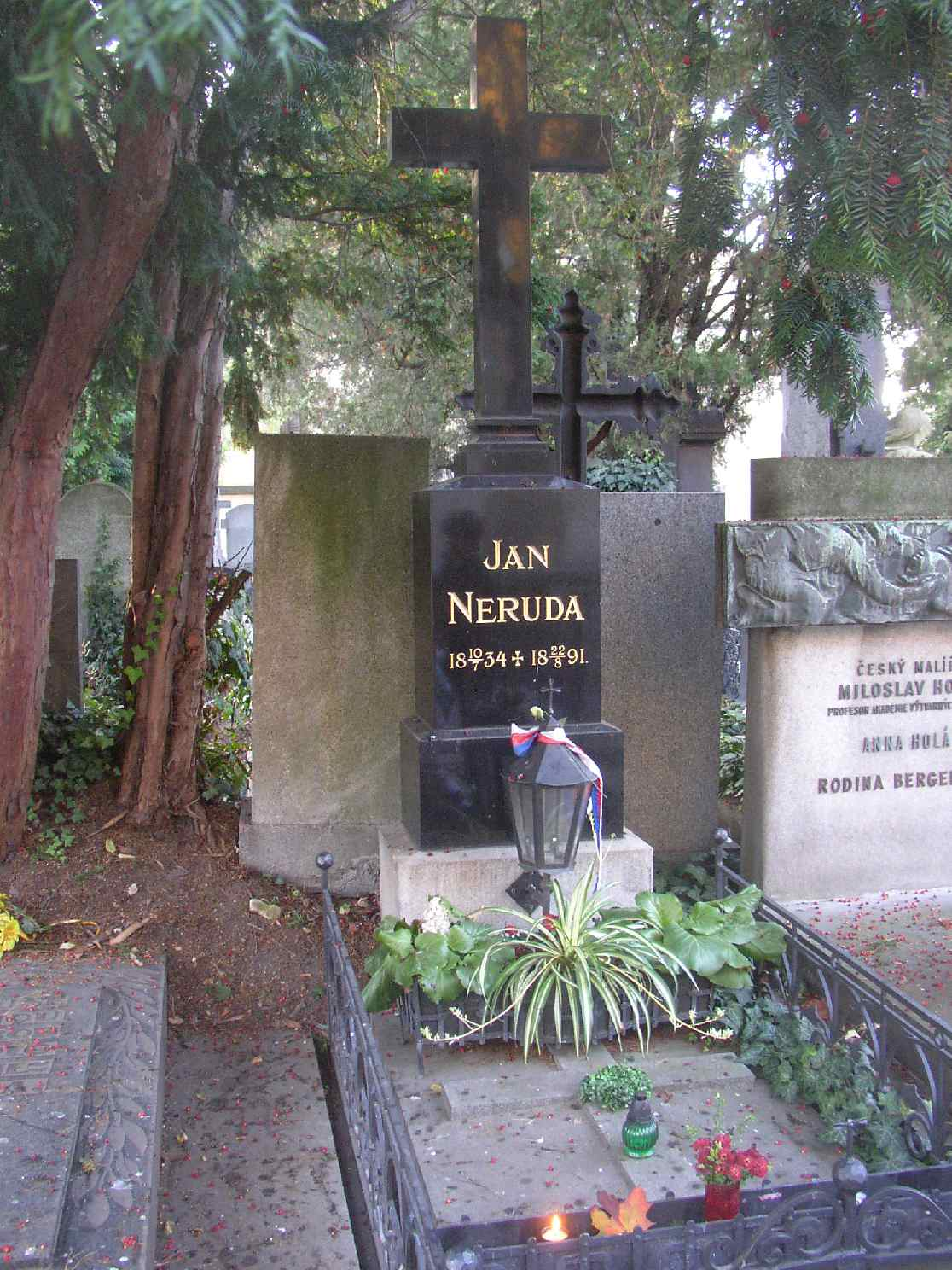
Neruda's grave.

Beginning in 1880, he suffered from a swelling of his veins, which contributed to a number of diseases that afflicted him for the rest of his life. In the winter of 1888, he shattered his kneecap when he slipped on some ice. From that time on, he relied on messengers to deliver his articles to Národní listy.

He died on 22 August 1891 from an inflammation of his digestive tract caused by intestinal cancer.

He was buried at Vyšehrad Cemetery in Prague. His funeral became the occasion for an expression of Czech nationalist sentiment.

== Works ==
=== Poetry ===
- Hřbitovní kvítí (“Graveyard Flowers”) – His first poetry. It was published in 1858. The entire book is pessimistic, skeptical and hopeless. Verses are growing out of disappointment with contemporary life, societies, the inactivity of the Nation, resistance to established morality. The social question is also addressed, the subject of poverty is treated. He does not trust love or people. Feelings of loneliness, fervor.
- Knihy veršů (“Books of Verses”) – published in 1867. He moderates his pessimism, finds the meaning of his life – in work and in sacrifice for the whole Nation. It shows love for his parents.This book is much more readable than other books, the poems are of good quality. Even here we find his gloomy social ballads. This book consists of three parts: 1. Kniha veršů výpravných (“A Book of Narrative Verses”), 2. Kniha veršů lyrických a smíšených (“A Book of Lyrical and Mixed Verses”) 3. Kniha veršů časových a příležitostných (“A Book of Time and Occasional Verses”).
- Písně kosmické (“Cosmic songs”) – published in 1878. In this books he is again discovering the meaning of his life, trying to be optimistic, responding to the development of science and technology. It celebrates cosmic bodies and human desire for knowledge. The work exhibits a materialistic understanding of the world, the universe is anthropomorphised. This work expresses feelings of the Generation called Májovci.
- Balady a romance ("Ballads and Romances)" – published between 1878 and 1883. He confuses ballads with romances so that they often sound like the opposites. The ballads often process national themes from the Bible or old legends, and the subject of mother-son relationships appears. Some of the favourite ballads or romances are for example Romance štědrovečerní (“Christmas Romance”), Romance o Karlu IV. (“Romance about Charles IV.”), Balada česká (“Czech Ballad”) or Balada o duši K. H. Borovského (“Ballad about the soul of K. H. Borovský”).
- Prosté motivy ("Plain Themes / Simple Motifs") – published in 1883. This is his intimate diary. The theme of nature is really important here. The human life is likened to a cycle of seasons. Spring = youth, summer = maturity, autumn = old age, winter = death. He describes this period.
- Zpěvy páteční ("Friday Songs") – published in 1896. This is his top work. This book came out after his death, prepared by Jaroslav Vrchlický. The life of the nation is compared to Good Friday, the author expresses the belief that a resurrection will come. It speaks of great love for the nation and reflects on national history – it turns to Hussitism. Parts of this book are V zemi kalichu (“In the country of the cup”), Anděl strážný (“Guardian angel”), Ecce homo and Láska (“Love”).

=== Prose ===
- Arabesky – This is his first book of prose, published in 1864. This is a set of short stories, whose core consists of stories from the late 1850s and early 1860s. In the forefront of these short stories there is no plot, but descriptive characteristics, reflection and dialogue. Humor, irony, sarcasm are significant features of the stories. In the foreground there are peculiar figurines that are captured in contrast to the environment they are included in. These are people from the periphery that society has eliminated. Neruda uncovers their sad and tragic moments, presenting them as full-fledged, emotionally rich. This puts him in opposition to prejudice and the conventional views of the time. Neruda uses his own experiences and familiar environments, gives the readers only cuts from the lives of characters. The stories Měla Gusto! and Za půl hodiny (“Within half an hour”), which contain sexual and erotic motifs that were taboos at the time, were added after Neruda's death.
- Různí lidé (“Different People”) – Studies and pictures of the nature and fate of the people he met abroad.
- Trhani – A novel about railroad workers.
- Pražské obrázky (“Pictures of Prague”) – This book captures the lives of the poor.
- Povídky malostránské (“Tales of the Lesser Quarter”) – This is his best-known prose work, published in 1877.The collection is considered a classic of Czech literature and a lasting part of the national educational tradition. It includes thirteen stories in which Jan Neruda portrays Prague’s Malá Strana in the early nineteenth century as a socially and linguistically diverse community. He created the picture of Prague's Lesser Quarter before 1848 on the basis of his own memories. Neruda's stories take the reader to its streets and yards, shops, churches, houses, and restaurants. It shows typical figures of the Czech Bourgeoisie. Depicting their qualities with humor, he criticizes local life. It uses the form of a novelistically integrated story, sometimes its narrative consists of a series of tiny shots of everyday life. The heroes are precisely characterized, each with a different expression. It was translated into English in 1957 by the novelist and mystery writer Ellis Peters.
- Praha (“Prague”)

=== Theatre plays ===
- Ženich z hladu (“Groom from hunger”)
- Prodaná láska (“Sold love”)
- Merenda nestřídmých
- Francesca di Rimini
- Žena miluje srdnatost
- Já to nejsem (“It’s not me”)

=== Feuilletons ===
- Žerty hravé a dravé (“Playful and predatory jokes”)
- Studie krátké a kratší (“Short and shorter studies”)
- Menší cesty (“Smaller trips”)
- Obrazy z ciziny (“Pictures from abroad”)

=== Journalism ===
- Obrazy z ciziny (“Pictures from abroad”)
- Rodinná kronika (“Family chronicle”)

== Legacy ==
- After his death, Ostruhová Street, which was the setting for many of his stories, was renamed Nerudova Street in his honor.
- The Chilean poet, Ricardo Eliecer Neftalí Reyes Basoalto, adopted the pseudonym Pablo Neruda, to express his admiration.
- Andrew J. Feustel took a copy of Cosmic Songs with him on space shuttle mission STS-125.
- Jan Neruda Grammar School is named for him.
- Statue of Jan Neruda, Prague
- 1875 Neruda (1969 QQ), a main-belt asteroid discovered in 1969 by Luboš Kohoutek is named in his honor.
- The Neruda crater on Mercury is named in honor of both him and fellow Czech, classical composer Johann Baptist Georg Neruda.
