= List of compositions by Bedřich Smetana =

Below is a list of compositions by Bedřich Smetana sorted by genre, catalogue numbers, original and English titles. JB numbers are from Tematický katalog skladeb Bedřicha Smetany (Thematic Catalogue of Works by Bedřich Smetana) by Jiří Berkovec (Prague, 1999). B. numbers are from the catalogue by František Bartoš. T. numbers are from the 1893 catalogue by Karel Teige.

Genre	JB	B	T	Composition date	Czech title (original title)	English title	Key	Scoring	Notes
Opera	1:87	124	90	1862–1863	Braniboři v Čechách	The Brandenburgers in Bohemia			in 3 acts; libretto by Karel Sabina
Opera	1:100	131	93	1863–1866	Prodaná nevěsta	The Bartered Bride (Die verkaufte Braut)			4 versions; revised 1868–1869 (B. 137 and B. 140) and 1870; libretto by Karel Sabina
Opera	1:101	133	96	1865–1867	Dalibor	Dalibor			in 3 acts; revised 1870; libretto by Josef Wenzig in Czech translation by Ervin Špindler
Opera	1:102		107	1869–1872	Libuše	Libuše			in 3 acts; libretto by Josef Wenzig in Czech translation by Ervin Špindler
Opera	1:108		109	1873–1874	Dvě vdovy	The Two Widows			in 2 acts; revised 1877; libretto by Emanuel Züngel, after Jean Pierre Félicien Mallefille's play Les deux veuves
Opera	1:104		115	1875–1876	Hubička	The Kiss			in 2 acts; libretto by Eliška Krásnohorská after the novel by Karolina Světlá
Opera	1:110		118	1877–1878	Tajemství	The Secret			in 3 acts; libretto by Eliška Krásnohorská
Opera	1:122		129	1879–1882	Čertova stěna	The Devil's Wall			in 3 acts; libretto by Eliška Krásnohorská
Opera	2:48		133	1874; 1883–1884	Viola	Viola			fragment; libretto by Eliška Krásnohorská after Shakespeare's play Twelfth Night
Orchestral	1:10	31	12	1842 ca.	Minuet	Minuet	B♭ major	for orchestra	
Orchestral	1:11	32	14	1842 ca.	Kvapík bajadér / Galopp bajadérek	Bayadere Galop	C major	for orchestra	
Orchestral	1:39	63	46	1848–1849	Velká předehra	Festive Overture (Jubel-Ouvertüre)	D major	for orchestra	Op. 4
Orchestral	1:59	92	59	1853–1854	Triumfální symfonie	Festive Symphony (Triumph-Symphonie)	E major	for orchestra	Op. 6; revised 1881
Orchestral	1:70	106	74	1857–1858	Richard III	Richard III	A minor	for orchestra	symphonic poem after the play by William Shakespeare; Op. 11
Orchestral	1:72	111	79	1858–1859	Valdštýnův tábor	Wallenstein's Camp	D major	for orchestra	symphonic poem; Op. 14; after the Wallenstein trilogy by Friedrich Schiller
Orchestral	1:79	118	82	1860–1861	Hakon Jarl	Hakon Jarl	C minor	for orchestra	symphonic poem; Op. 16; after the tragic drama by Adam Gottlob Oehlenschläger
Orchestral	1:85	123	91	1862	Doktor Faust, Předehra k loutkové hře Matěje Kopeckého	Doctor Faust, Prelude to a Puppet Play by Matěj Kopecký	C minor	for orchestra	
Orchestral	1:86	125	49	1862–1863	Našim děvám	To Our Girls	D major	for orchestra	polka; revised 1888
Orchestral	1:88	127	94	1863	Oldřich a Božena, Předehra k loutkové hře Matěje Kopeckého	Oldřich and Božena, Prelude to a Puppet Play by Matěj Kopecký	C major	for orchestra	
Orchestral	1:90	129	95	1864	Pochod k slavnosti Shakespearově	Solemn March for Shakespeare Celebrations	E major	for orchestra	Op. 20
Orchestral	1:92	132	97	1867	Fanfáry k Shakespearovu dramatu Richard III	Fanfares for Shakespeare's Richard III		for brass and timpani	
Orchestral	1:95	136	102	1868	Slavnostní předehra k položení základního kamene Národního Divadla	Solemn Prelude on the Occasion of Laying the Foundation Stone for the National Theatre	C major	for orchestra	
Orchestral	1:97	138	103	1869	Rybář	The Fisherman	E♭ major	for harmonium, harp and string orchestra	
Orchestral	1:98	139	104	1869	Libušin soud, Hudba k živému obrazu podle básně Rukopisu Zelenohorského	Libuše's Judgement, Music for a Live Picture after a Poem from the Zelená Hora Manuscript	C major	for orchestra	
Orchestral	1:112		110; 111; 113; 114; 120; 121	1872–1874; 1874; 1875; 1875; 1878; 1879	Má vlast: 1. Vyšehrad; 2. Vltava; 3. Šarka; 4. Z českých luhů a hájů 5. Tábor; 6. Blaník	My Country: 1. Vyšehrad; 2. Vltava (Die Moldau); 3. Šarka; 4. From Bohemian Woods and Fields; 5. Tábor; 6. Blaník	E♭ major E minor A minor G minor D minor D minor	for orchestra	Cycle of 6 symphonic poems
Orchestral	1:115		123	1879	Venkovanka	The Country Woman	G major	for orchestra	polka; also for piano
Orchestral	1:126		135	1882–1883	Pražský karneval: Introdukce a polonéza	The Prague Carnival	A minor	for orchestra	Introduction and Polonaise
Chamber music	1:12	35	16	1843	Fantasie na českou národní píseň „Sil jsem proso“	Fantasy on a Bohemian Song	G minor	for violin and piano	
Chamber music	1:64	96	64	1855	Klavírní Trio	Piano Trio	G minor	for violin, cello and piano	Op. 15; revised 1857, B. 104
Chamber music	1:105		116	1876	Smyčcový kvartet č. 1 „Z mého života“	String Quartet No.1 "From My Life" (Aus meinem Leben)	E minor	for 2 violins, viola and cello	
Chamber music	1:118		128	1879–1880	Z domoviny	From My Homeland (Aus der Heimat), 2 Pieces	A major G minor	for violin and piano	
Chamber music	1:124		131	1882–1883	Smyčcový kvartet č. 2	String Quartet No.2	D minor	for 2 violins, viola and cello	
Organ	1:30	52	35	1846	Šest preludií	6 Preludes	C major C minor G major G minor D major F major	for organ	
Piano	2:1	3		1831–1832	Kvapík	Galop	D major	for piano	
Piano	1:1	12	4	1840	Louisina Polka	Louisina Polka (Louise's Polka)	D major	for piano	
Piano	1:2	13	8	1840	Jiřinková Polka	Georgina Polka (Dahlia Polka)	D major	for piano	
Piano	1:3	7	5	1840	Galopp di bravoura	Galopp di bravoura	B♭ major	for piano	
Piano	1:4	22	6	1841	Impromptu	Impromptu	E♭ minor	for piano	
Piano	1:5	23	7	1841	Impromptu	Impromptu	B minor	for piano	
Piano	1:6	24	11	1842	Impromptu	Impromptu	A♭ major	for piano	
Piano	1:7	28	13	1842?	Ouvertura	Overture	C minor	for piano 4-hands	
Piano	1:8	29	15	1842?	Ouvertura	Overture	A major	for piano 4-hands	
Piano	1:9	30		1842 ca.	„Ze studentského života“ Polka	From Student Life	C major	for piano	polka; revised 1858, B. 110
Piano	1:13	27	17	1842 ca.	Duo beze slov	Duo without Words (Duet)	E major	for piano	
Piano	1:14	33	18	1843	Quadrille	Quadrille	B♭ major	for piano	
Piano	2:10	34	19	1843	Skladba bez názvu (Rhapsodie)	Untitled Piece (Rhapsody)	A♭ major	for piano	
Piano	1:16	36	20	1843–1844	Quadrille	Quadrille	F major	for piano	
Piano	1:15	38	21	1843–1844	Skladba bez nadpisu (Mazurkové capriccio)	Untitled Piece (Mazurka-Capriccio)	C♯ minor	for piano	
Piano	1:17	37	38	1843–1844	„Vzpomínka na Plzeň“ Polka	Souvenir of Pilsen (Erinnerung an Pilsen)	E♭ major	for piano	polka
Piano	1:19	40	27	1844	Bagately a impromptus: 1. Nevinnost; 2. Sklíčenost; 3. Idyla; 4. Touha; 5. Radost; 6. Pohádka; 7. Láska; 8. Nesvár	Bagatelles and Impromptus (Bagatelles et impromptus): 1. Innocence (L'innocence); 2. Dejection (L'abattement); 3. Idyll (L'idylle); 4. Longing (Le désir); 5. Happiness (La joie); 6. Fairy Tale (Le conte); 7. Love (L'amour); 8. Quarrel (La discorde)	C major A minor G major E minor D major B minor A major F♯ minor	for piano	Op. 6
Piano	1:18	39	22	1844	Valčíky	5 Waltzes	C minor A♭ major E♭ major C minor A♭ major	for piano	
Piano	1:20; 1:25; 1:21; 1:22; 1:23; 1:81			1844–1862; 1844; 1845; 1845; 1845; 1845? 1862	Šest lístků do památníku: 1. Kateřině Kolářové; 2. Alžbětě Felicii Thunové; 3. Josephini Finkové; 4. Janu Kunzovi; 5. Václavi Ulwerovi; 6. Marii Prokschové	6 Album Leaves: 1. To Kateřina Kolářová; 2. To Elizabeth Felicia Thun; 3. To Josephina Fink; 4. To Jean Kunz; 5. To Wenzel Ulwer; 6. To Marie Proksch	B major E major C minor E♭ minor A♭ major C major	for piano	
Piano	1:24	46		1845	Pensée fugitive	Pensée fugitive	D minor	for piano	
Piano		A43		1845	Pochod válečníků	March of the Soldiers	D major	for piano	
Piano		A50		1845	Venkovský pochod	Rustic March	B♭ major	for piano	
Piano		A55		1845	Triumfalní pochod	Triumphant March	E major	for piano	
Piano	1:26	47	26	1845	Skladba bez nadpisu	Untitled Piece	G minor	for 2 pianos 8-hands	
Piano	3:24	A76	35	1846	Klavírní sonáta	Piano Sonata	G minor	for piano	
Piano	1:28	50	37	1846	Polka	Polka	E♭ major	for piano	
Piano	3:18	A57	28	1846	Etuda (ve formě preludia)	Étude in Prelude Form	C major	for piano	
Piano	3:18	A58	28	1846	Etuda (ve formě písně)	Étude in Song Form	A minor	for piano	
Piano		A60	29	1846	Charakteristické variace na českou píseň „Sil jsem proso“	Variations on the Czech Song "Sil jsem proso"	G major	for piano	
Piano	1:30	52	35	1846	Šest preludií	6 Preludes		for piano 4-hands	
Piano	1:31	53	52	1847; 1855	Lesní city a dojmy: Nocturno	Forest Impressions and Emotions: Nocturne	F minor	for piano	
Piano	1:32	55	48	1847?	Allegro capriccioso	Allegro capriccioso	B minor	for piano	
Piano	1:33	54		1847?	Romance	Romance	B♭ major	for piano	revised 1883
Piano	1:34	56		1847–1848	Charakteristická skladba	Character Piece (Morceau caractéristique)	C♭ major	for piano	
Piano	1:35	57	44	1847–1848	Šest charakteristických skladeb: 1. V lese 2. Vznikající vášeň 3. Pastýřka; 4. Touha; 5. Válečník; 6. Zoufalství	6 Character Pieces: 1. In the Forest (Im Walde); 2. Rising Passion (Erwachende Leidenschaft); 3. The Shepherdess (Das Schäfermädchen); 4. Desire (Die Sehnsucht); 5. The Warrior (Der Kreiger); 6. Desperation (Die Verzweiflung)	C major C minor G major G minor D major D minor	for piano	Op. 1
Piano	1:36	58	45a	1848	Pochod pražské studentské legie	March of the Prague Student Legion (Marsch der Prager Studenten-Legion)	F major	for piano	
Piano	1:37	59	45b	1848	Pochod národní gardy	National Guard March (Nationalgarde-Marsch)	D major	for piano	
Piano	2:17	62	42	1848	Caprice	Caprice	G minor	for piano	
Piano	1:42	75		1848–1849	Lístek do památníku	Album Leaf	G minor	for piano	
Piano				1848–1850	Lístek do památníku	Album Leaf	E♭ major	for piano	
Piano				1848–1852	Lístek do památníku	Album Leaf	F♯ minor	for piano	
Piano				1848–1852	Lístek do památníku	Album Leaf	E major	for piano	
Piano				1848–1852	Lístek do památníku	Album Leaf	G♯ minor	for piano	
Piano	1:60	94	62	1848–1854	Tři salonní polky	3 Salon Polkas (3 Polkas de salon)	F♯ major F minor E major	for piano	Op. 7
Piano	1:66	101	68	1848–1857	Črty 1: 1. Preludium; 2. Idyla; 3. Vzpomínka; 4. Vytrvalá snaha	Sketches I: 1. Prelude; 2. Idyll; 3. A Memory; 4. Perseverance	F♯ minor B major A♭ major G♯ minor	for piano	Op. 4
Piano	1:67	102	68	1848–1857	Črty 2: 1. Scherzo-polka; 2. Zádumčivost; 3. Přívětivá krajina 4. Rhapsodie	Sketches II: 1. Scherzo-Polka; 2. Melancholy; 3. The Pleasant Countryside; 4. Rhapsody	F♯ major G♯ minor D♭ major F minor	for piano	Op. 5
Piano	1:44	64	41	1849	Svatební scény: 1. Svatební průvod 2. Ženich a nevěsta 3. Svatební veselí: Tanec	Wedding Scenes: 1. Wedding March; 2. The Bride and Groom; 3. Wedding Merriment: Dance	C major A♭ major A major	for piano	
Piano	1:45	77			Lístek do památníku	Album Leaf	A major	for piano	
Piano	1:46	78			Lístek do památníku	Album Leaf	B♭ major	for piano	
Piano	1:47	70	47	1849	Sonátová věta	Sonata Movement	E minor	for 2 pianos 8-hands	
Piano	1:48	72	50	1849–1850	Poklad melodií [1]: 1. Preludium; 2. Capriccio; 3. Allegro vivace	A Treasure of Melodies I (Trésor de mélodies I)	C major A minor G major	for piano	
Piano	1:49	71		1849–1850	Poklad melodií [2]: 1. Moderato; 2. Toccata; 3. Moderato; 4. Tempo di marcia	A Treasure of Melodies II (Trésor de mélodies II)	C major G major D major A major E major	for piano	
Piano	1:51	86	53	1849–1850	Šest lístků do památníku: 1. Allegro – Prélude; 2. Moderato – Chanson; 3. Vivace; 4. Allegro comodo 5. Moderato con amina 6. Andante ma non troppo	6 Album Leaves	C major A minor G major E minor D major B minor	for piano	Op. 2
Piano	1:65	100	67	1849–1850	Tři lístky do památníku: 1. Robertu Schumannovi; 2. Píseň pocestného 3. Je slyšet sykot, hukot, a svist...	3 Album Leaves: 1. To Robert Schumann; 2. Wanderer's Song; 3. Es siedet und braust	E major A major F♯ minor	for piano	Op. 3
Piano	1:53; 1:41; 1:43; 1:54; 1:52	84; 74; 76; 85; 80	30	1849–1850	Skladby psané do památníku: 1. Lístek do památníku 2. Toccatina; 3. Lístek do památníku 4. Lístek do památníku 5. Lístek do památníku 6. Lístek do památníku	Album Leaves: 1. Album Leaf; 2. Toccatina; 3. Album Leaf; 4. Album Leaf; 5. Album Leaf; 6. Album Leaf	B minor B♭ major G major B minor E♭ minor B♭ minor	for piano	
Piano	1:50	73	57	1850	Rondo pro mládež	Rondo for the Young	C major	for 2 pianos 8-hands	
Piano	1:57; 1:55; 1:56; 1:63	90; 88; 89; 93	56; 54; 55; 93	1852–1854	Polky z let padesátých	4 Polkas from the 1850s	E major G minor A major F minor	for piano	completed 1883
Piano	1:61	95	63	1854	Tři poetické polky	3 Poetic Polkas (3 Polkas poétiques)	E♭ major G minor A♭ major	for piano	Op. 8
Piano	1:62	97	65	1855?	Andante	Andante	E♭ major	for piano	
Piano	2:42	D49		1857–1858	Cid	Cid		for piano	incomplete
Piano	2:43	107	70	1858	Balada	Ballade	E minor	for piano	incomplete
Piano	1:71	109	69	1858	Vidění na plese (Polka-rhapsódie)	Ball-Vision	A minor	for piano	
Piano	1:71	109		1858	Polka	Polka	C major	for piano	revision of Vidění na plese
Piano	1:73	108	71	1858	Scherzo-etuda	Scherzo-Étude	C major	for piano	original version of Concert Étude
Piano	1:69	105	72	1858	Zvědavý, transkripce písně Franze Schuberta z cyklu Krásná mlynářka	Transcription of Schubert's Der Neugierige	B major	for piano	Op. 10; from Franz Schubert's song cycle Die schöne Müllerin
Piano	1:73	113	75	1858–1859	Koncertní etuda	Concert Étude	C major	for piano	
Piano	1:75	112	80	1859	Macbeth, skizza ke scéně „Macbeth a čarodějnice“ ze Shakespeara	Macbeth (Macbeth and the Witches)	G minor	for piano	after a scene from William Shakespeare's Macbeth
Piano	1:74	114	81	1859	Bettina Polka	Bettina Polka	C major	for piano	version 1
Piano	1:76	115	83	1859–1860	Vzpomínky na Čechy ve formě polek	Souvenir de Bohême en forme de polkas	A minor E minor	for piano	Op. 12
Piano	1:77	116	84	1859–1860	Vzpomínky na Čechy ve formě polek	Souvenir de Bohême en forme de polkas	E minor E♭ major	for piano	Op. 13
Piano	1:80	119	86	1861	Na břehu mořském, (vzpomínka) koncertní etuda	On the Seashore, Concert Étude	G♯ minor	for piano	Op. 17
Piano	1:83	121	88	1862	Koncertní fantasie na české národní písně	Fantasy on Czech Folksongs	B major	for piano	
Piano			100	1868	Z Dalibora, Fantasie na temata z opery Dalibor	Fantasy on Themes from the Opera Dalibor		for piano	
Piano			108	1873	Motivy z opery Dalibor, Potpourri	Potpourri, Themes from the Opera Dalibor		for piano	
Piano				1874	Polka z Dvou vdov	Polka from The Two Widows	C major	for piano	
Piano	1:103		112	1874–1875	Sny: Šest charakteristických skladeb: 1. Zaniklé štěstí 2. Útěcha; 3. V Čechách: Vesnický výjev 4. V salóně 5. Před hradem 6. Slavnost českých venkovanů/Selská slavnost	Dreams (Rêves): 1. Bygone Happiness (Le bonheur éteint); 2. Consolation (La consolation); 3. In Bohemia (En Bohême); 4. In the Salon (Au salon); 5. Before the Castle (Près du château); 6. Czech Peasants' Festival (La fête des paysans bohémiens)	E♭ major F minor A minor E major B minor G minor	for piano	
Piano	1:107		112/1	1877	České tance 1: 4 Polky	Czech Dances I: 4 Polkas	F♯ minor A minor F major B♭ major	for piano	
Piano	1:114		112/2	1879	České tance 2: 1. Furiant; 2. Slepička; 3. Oves; 4. Medvěd; 5. Cibulička; 6. Dupák; 7. Hulán; 8. Obkročák; 9. Sousedská; 10. Skočná / Skočrst	Czech Dances II: 1. Furiant; 2. The Little Hen; 3. Oats; 4. The Bear; 5. The Little Onion; 6. Stamping Dance; 7. The Lancer; 8. Step Dance; 9. Neighbor's Dance; 10. Leaping Dance	A minor B♭ major A♭ major C major G major D major A major E♭ major B major F major	for piano	Op. 21
Piano	1:115		123	1879	„Venkovanka“ Polka	The Country Woman	G major	for piano	polka; also for orchestra
Piano	1:117		125	1880	Andante	Andante	F minor	for piano	
Piano	1:121		130	1880	Romance	Romance	G minor	for piano	
Piano	1:74	114	81	1883	Bettina Polka	Bettina Polka	C major	for piano	version 2
Piano					Dvojitá fuga	Two-voice Fugue		for piano	
Piano					Třihlasá fuga	Three-voice Fugue		for piano	
Piano					Čtyřhlasá fuga	Four-voice Fugue		for piano	
Piano	4:4	103	85	1857, 1872		Cadenzas to Beethoven's Piano Concerto No. 3 in C minor, Op. 37		for piano	
Piano	4:1	98		1856		Cadenzas to Mozart's Piano Concerto No. 20 in D minor, KV466		for piano	
Piano	4:2	99		1856?		Cadenza to Mozart's Piano Concerto No. 24 in C minor, KV491		for piano	
Piano	4:3	130		1864?		Cadenzas to Mozart's Piano Concerto No. 27 in B♭ major, KV595		for piano	
Piano						Fragments and Sketches		for piano	
Choral				1846	Jesu meine Freude				Chorale
Choral				1846	Ich hoffe auf den Herrn				Fugue
Choral				1846	Lobet den Herrn				Introduction and Fugue
Choral				1846	Heilig ist der Herr Zebaoth				
Choral		A77		1846	Scapulis suis obumbrabit tibi dominus			for chorus, horns, strings and organ	
Choral		A78		1846	Medtabitur in mandatis tuis			for chorus, horns, strings and organ	
Choral	1:38	60		1848	Píseň svobody	Song of Liberty		for male chorus and piano	
Choral	1:78	117		1860	Píseň česká	Czech Song		for male chorus or mixed chorus	
Choral	1:84	122	89	1862	Tři jezdci	The Three Riders		for male chorus	
Choral	1:89	126	92	1863	Odrodilec	The Renegade		for male chorus	revised 1864, JB 1:91
Choral	1:94	135	99	1868	Rolnická	Farmer's Song (The Peasant)		for male chorus	
Choral	1:96		101	1868	Česká píseň	Czech Song		for chorus and piano or orchestra	revised 1878, JB 1:111
Choral	1:99		106	1870	Slavnostní sbor	Festive Chorus		for male chorus	
Choral	1:106		117	1876–1877	Píseň na moři	The Song of the Sea		for male chorus	
Choral	1:109		119	1878	Tři ženské sbory: 1. Má hvězda 2. Přiletěly vlaštovičky 3. Za hory slunce zapadá	3 Female Choruses: 1. My Star; 2. The Swallows Have Returned; 3. The Sunset over the Mountains		for female chorus	
Choral	1:119		126	1880	Věno	The Dower		for male chorus	
Choral	1:120		127	1880	Modlitba	Prayer		for male chorus	
Choral	1:123		132	1882	Dvě hesla	2 Slogans (2 Mottos)		for male chorus	
Choral	1:125		134	1883	Naše píseň	Our Song		for male chorus	
Vocal	3:25	A70	32	1846	Pohled mé dívky			for voice and piano	
Vocal	3:25	A71	33	1846	Sbohem!	Farewell!		for voice and piano	
Vocal	1:27	49	34	1846	Bolest odloučení			for voice and piano	
Vocal	1:29	51	40	1846	Vyzvání			for voice and piano	
Vocal	1:53	91	58	1853	Jaro lásky			for voice and piano	
Vocal	1:93	134	98	1867	O Gustave, můj králi			for voice and piano	
Vocal	1:116		124	1879	Večerní písně: 1. Kdo v zlaté struny zahrát zná 2. Nakamenujte proroky!; 3. Mně zdálo se 4. Hej, jaká radost v kole 5. Z svých písní trůn ti udělám	Evening Songs: 1. He Who Can Play the Golden Strings; 2. Do Not Stone the Prophets!; 3. I Once Dreamed; 4. Oh, What Joy When Dancing; 5. I'll Build You a Throne from My Songs		for voice and piano	words by Vítězslav Hálek

== See also ==
- List of operas by Bedřich Smetana
