= String Quartet No. 1 (Smetana) =

Composition by Bedřich Smetana

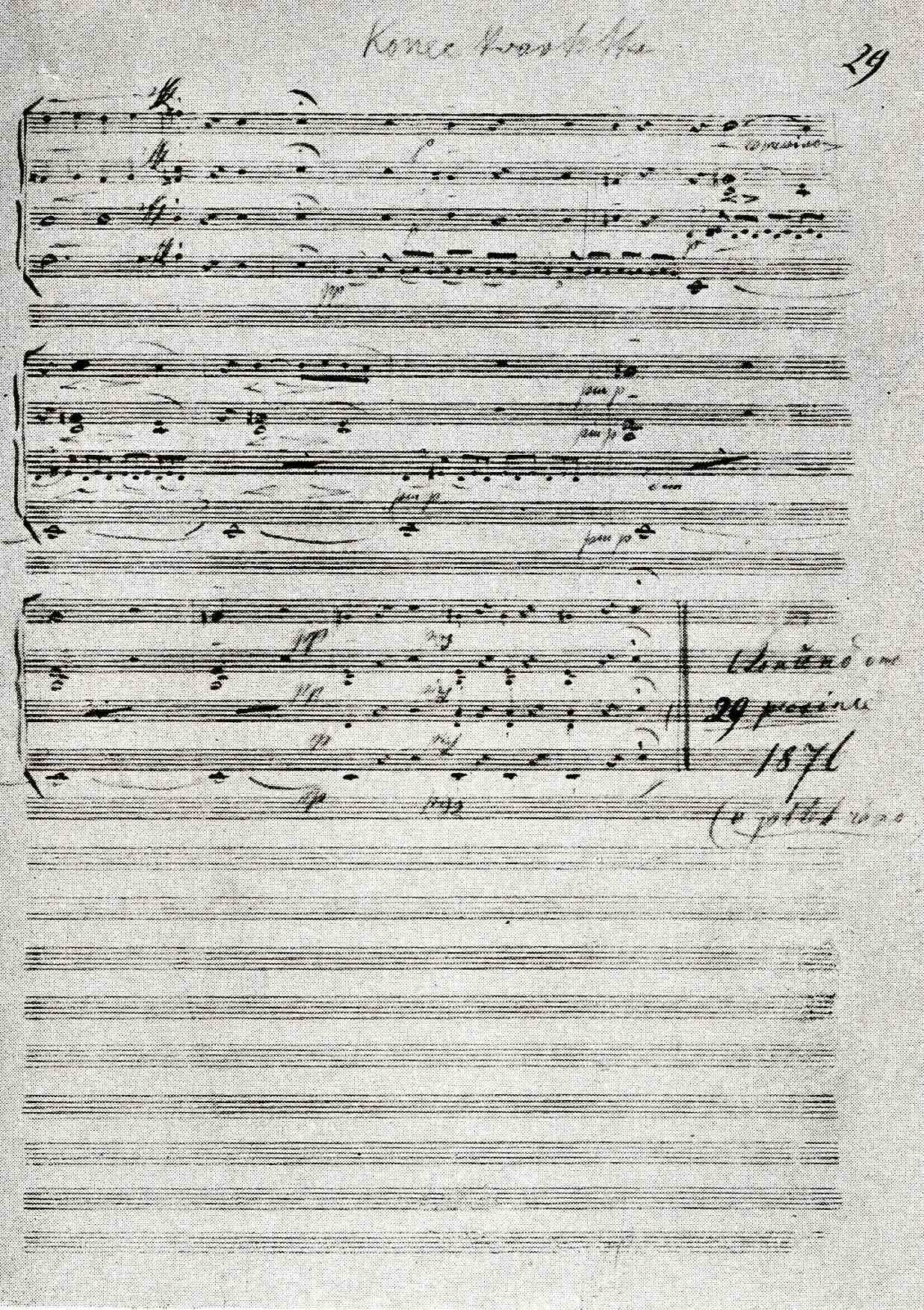
The last page of the autograph score of Smetana's first string quartet

String Quartet No. 1 ("From My Life", Czech: "Z mého života") in E minor, written in 1876, is a four-movement chamber composition by Czech composer Bedřich Smetana. It is an autobiographical work with nationalistic elements and was published in 1880 by František Augustin Urbánek in Prague. It was given a private premiere in 1878 in Prague, with Antonín Dvořák as violist, and its public premiere took place on 29 March 1879, performed by Ferdinand Lachner, Jan Pelikán, Josef Krehan and Alois Neruda. Smetana was a complex figure in his time, straddling his Austro-Hungarian upbringing coupled with his ethnic Czech background. His first quartet encompasses the politics and culture that resulted from that upbringing.

== Background ==
=== Autobiography ===
At an unknown point in Smetana’s life, he contracted syphilis—in 1874, at 50 years old, his health began to swiftly decline. After a gradual decrease in his hearing, he became completely deaf by October of that year. It is widely believed that his deafness was caused by syphilis. After becoming deaf, Smetana moved in 1876 from Prague to Jabkenice. He still hoped that the condition would not be permanent. In the autumn of that year, he began to compose a new work. It was to be his intimate confession, a work depicting the course of his life. Included in the work was a high-pitched E natural which mimicked the ringing in his ears. He completed the composition on 29 December 1876. In a letter to his friend Josef Srb-Debrnov, Smetana formulated the work's ideological conception and the features of the individual movements. Smetana endured many hardships throughout his life, and these hardships inspired him to write music. For example, his daughter's death was the inspiration to write his Piano Trio in G minor, while the death of his first wife, Catherine, was the inspiration for the third movement of his String Quartet No. 1. The work was published in 1880 by Fr. Urbánek in Prague.

=== Nationalism ===
Though he was known for his orchestral and operatic works, in his last years, Smetana’s From My Life (Quartet No. 1) was played more frequently than his other works. His chamber music was seen as less of a threat perhaps because much of his other work held political undertones of Czech nationalism. While his Quartet No. 1 was not overtly political, it honored his Czech roots with the polka featured in the second movement.

Before 1848, in Czech lands, most of the bourgeoisie spoke German as their first language. Smetana's parents spoke mostly Czech at home and German in their professional life. Smetana himself studied in schools, where education was provided in German and struggled to master the Czech language later in life. His music is often held as the beginning and premier of distinctively Czech music.

== Structure ==
The cycle consists of four movements:

1. Allegro vivo appassionato
2. Allegro moderato à la Polka
3. Largo sostenuto
4. Vivace

Smetana described the first movement as a romantically driven sketch of his youth as an artist. He also wrote of the movement’s forewarning of the future, as well as a longing for the indefinable. Smetana described the second movement as a polka holding nationalistic tones. The movement depicts his youth as a lover of dance—Smetana held this love from the early age of 6. The third movement was composed as a tribute to his first wife, whom Smetana pronounced his “first love.” The last movement entails Smetana’s loss of hearing and the decay of his health, containing a held E natural which mimicked the ringing in his ears. In his letter, Smetana understood his First Quartet to take on an unconventional form.

The work is semi-autobiographical and consists of sketches of periods from Smetana's life, as is suggested by its subtitle Z mého života ("From My Life"). Its notable features include a prominent viola solo at the very beginning of the first movement, and a high, sustained harmonic E on the first violin in the last movement, which represents the ringing in his ears that presaged Smetana's deafness, although the actual ringing was a chord in A-flat major.

The prominent viola solo in the first movement, as well as the significant use of viola throughout, uniquely captures the sense of foreboding and the rich romanticism entailed throughout the movement.

A performance of the full work lasts around 28 minutes.

== Use in film ==
The dramatic opening of the first movement was featured in the 1992 film Sneakers at a concert which the characters attend.

== Orchestral version ==
George Szell orchestrated the piece in the mid-twentieth century to bring it to new audiences. This version is rarely played, but orchestral recordings exist and it was performed at the BBC Proms in 2012.

== See also ==
- String Quartet No. 2 (Smetana)

== See also ==
- List of compositions by Bedřich Smetana
