= Alois Neruda =

Czech cellist

Alois Neruda (baptised Alois Jan; 20 June 1837 – 25 January 1899) was a Czech cellist.

== Life ==
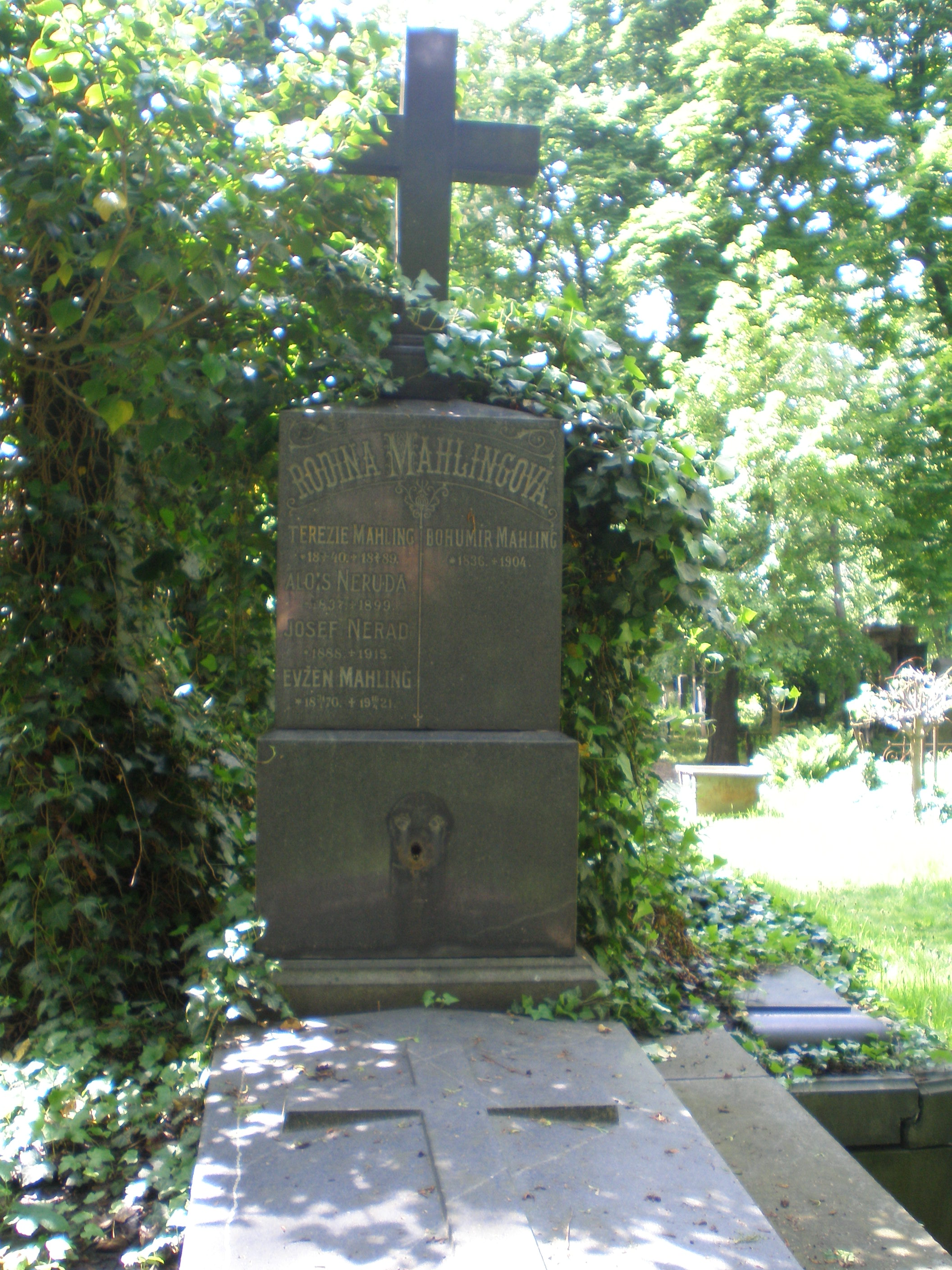
Neruda's grave at the Olšany Cemetery

Neruda was born on 20 June 1837 in Kostelec nad Labem. His father was the composer and singing teacher Josef Neruda (1804–1876). He won a demanding competition for the position of solo cellist of the Provisional and the National Theatre there, having worked in this position for 26 years. During his time in Prague, Neruda became close friends with Bedřich Smetana, who often entrusted him with the premiere interpretation of his compositions, considering Neruda to be one of the best instrumentalists in Prague. In 1879, Neruda played in the premiere performance of Smetana's quartet "From My Life", and in 1884 Neruda was the cellist for the premiere of Smetana's second string quartet. Alois Neruda often performed with Antonín Dvořák in his chamber compositions, and was the cellist in numerous premiere performances of Dvořák's works; Dvořák composed a Polonaise in A major for Neruda. Josef Nešvera and Heinrich von Kàan-Albést also dedicated works to Neruda.

He died on 25 January 1899 in Prague, and was buried at the Olšany Cemetery in Prague.
