= Bettina Smetanová =

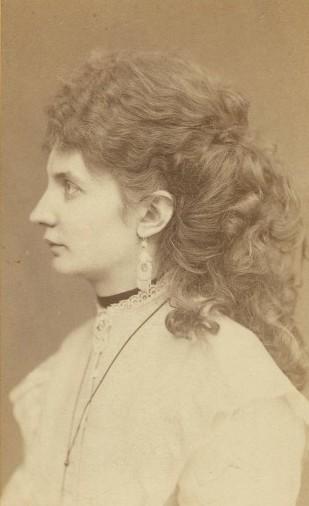
Bettina Smetanová

Bettina Smetanová (née Ferdinandiová; 9 November 1840 – 14 December 1908) was the second wife of Bedřich Smetana.

== Life ==
She was baptised Barbora Marie. Her father, Franz (František) Ferdinandi (1799–1878) was the administrator of the estate in Obříství from 1841, where in 1849 he purchased the homestead of Lamberk as a family residence. With his wife Barbara, née Pelzová (1805–1883), he had eight children.

The youngest of seven daughters was Barbora (Bettina), born at Černé Budy.

She became related to Smetana through the marriage of her sister Albertina to Bedřich's younger brother, Karel Smetana. Bedřich Smetana was a widower when he met Bettina in July 1859; he fell in love with her and proposed to her. Bettina, who was 16 years younger than him, agreed, but requested a one-year delay. Their wedding took place on July 10, 1860, in Obříství, after which they departed for Smetana's final year in Sweden.

From the marriage two daughters were born, Zdenka (1861–1936, married name Heydušková) and Božena (1863–1941, married name Grafová). Bettina's mother tongue was German, by which she initially communicated with Smetana. Only after the final settlement in Bohemia (1862) did both of them change to speaking Czech.

Smetana wrote musical pieces for her: Bettina polka (JB 1:74), Souvenir de Bohême en forme de polkas, op. 13 (JB 1:77) and Evening Songs (JB 1:116) on the words of Vítězslav Hálek.

In 1876 the family moved from Prague to Jabkenice, the home of her stepdaughter, Smetana's eldest daughter Žofie.

She died in 1908 in Luhačovice, where she was buried in the local cemetery.

== Bibliography ==
- Bartoš, František. Smetana ve vzpomínkách a dopisech. (tr. "Smetana in Memories and Letters") 9th ed. Prague: SNKLHU, 1954.
- Čapková, Běla. Z jabkenické myslivny. (tr. "From the Jabkenice hunting lodge"). 2nd edition, Prague: Supraphon, 1968/1982.
- Hnilička, Alois. Z rodinné korespondence Smetanovy. Příspěvek k povahopisu paní Bettiny Smetanové. (tr. "From the Smetana family correspondence. Contribution to the character profile of Mrs. Bettina Smetana.") Hudební revue. 1913/14, roč. 7, Vol. 6–7, pp. 291–297.
- Holzknecht, Václav. Bedřich Smetana. Život a dílo. (tr. "Bedřich Smetana. Life and work.") 2nd edition, Prague: Panton, 1984. ISID216470
- Očadlík, Mirko. Ženy v životě Bedřicha Smetany. (tr. "Women in the life of Bedřich Smetana") 1st edition, Prague: Vyšehrad, 1941.
- Pistoriusová, Blažena. Josef Jiránek. Vzpomínky a korespondence s Bedřichem Smetanou. Umělecký a lidský portrét ve vzpomínkách, korespondenci a současné kritice. (tr. Memories and correspondence with Bedřich Smetana. Artistic and human portrait in memories, correspondence and contemporary criticism") 2nd edition, Prague: SNKLHU, 1957.
- Séquardtová, Hana. Bedřich Smetana. 1st edition, Prague: Editio Supraphon, 1988.
- Smolka, Jaroslav. Osudové lásky Bedřicha Smetany. (tr. "The Fateful Loves of Bedřich Smetana") 1st edition, Prague: Media Bohemica, 1998.
