= List of operas by Bedřich Smetana =

This is a list of operas by the Czech composer Bedřich Smetana (1824–1884). All premieres took place in Prague.

== List ==
| B | T | Title | Subdivisions | Libretto | Composition date | Première date | Theatre |
|---|---|---|---|---|---|---|---|
| 124 | 90 | The Brandenburgers in Bohemia (Braniboři v Čechách) | 3 acts | Karel Sabina | 1862–1863 | 5 January 1866 | Provisional |
| 143 | 93 | The Bartered Bride (Prodaná nevěsta; German: Die verkaufte Braut) | 3 acts | Karel Sabina | 1863–1866, revised 1869 and 1870 | 30 May 1866 | Provisional |
| 133 | 96 | Dalibor | 3 acts | Josef Wenzig (Czech translation: Ervín Špindler) | 1865–1867, revised 1870 | 16 May 1868 | New Town |
| | 107 | Libuše | 3 acts | Josef Wenzig (Czech translation: Ervin Špindler) | 1869–1872 | 11 June 1881 | National |
| | 109 | The Two Widows (Dvě vdovy) | 2 acts | Emanuel Züngel, after Jean Pierre Félicien Mallefille's play Les deux veuves | 1873–1874, revised 1877 | 27 March 1874 | Provisional |
| | 115 | The Kiss (Hubička) | 2 acts | Eliška Krásnohorská, after the novel by Karolina Světlá | 1875–1876 | 7 November 1876 | Provisional |
| | 118 | The Secret (Tajemství) | 3 acts | Eliška Krásnohorská | 1877–1878 | 18 September 1878 | New Czech Theatre |
| | 129 | The Devil's Wall (Čertova stěna) | 3 acts | Eliška Krásnohorská | 1879–1882 | 29 October 1882 | New Czech Theatre |
| | 133 | Viola | | Eliška Krásnohorská, after Shakespeare's play Twelfth Night | 1874, 1883–1884 (fragment) | 15 March 1900 (concert version), 11 May 1924 (staged) | National (1924) |
