= Piano Trio in G minor (Smetana) =

1855 composition by Bedřich Smetana

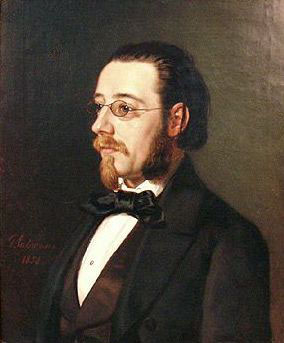
Oil portrait of Bedřich Smetana by Geskel Saloman (1854)

The Piano Trio in G minor, Op. 15, for piano, violin, and cello, was written in 1855 by Bedřich Smetana initially as his Opus 9. Following some revision, he had finished and premiered the revised work in Sweden in 1858. The work was then officially published in 1880. This piece was dedicated to the memory of his eldest daughter, Bedřiška. This work features paraphrases and quotations of his previous Piano Sonata in G minor JB 3:24 (1846). This work takes approximately 28–32 minutes to perform.

== Structure ==
This piano trio consists of three movements:

=== I. Moderato assai ===
The first movement (3/4, G minor) follows a sonata form beginning with a seven-measure violin solo that is in the lowest register (sul G, on the G string) that starts on the dominant. These seven measures will indicate the first theme that will also be featured in the development of the work. The second theme is introduced in measure 48 featuring the cello (with piano accompaniment). This theme can be identified as more diatonic in contrast to the first, and it is expanded on in the Più Animato section of the movement. There is a Tempo Rubato section that will lead to the Recapitulation that has the first theme abridged by the Violin solo once again. This piece ends with a Coda that is an elaboration of the first theme reiterated in the Tonic. This movement ends with three sforzandi that have varying inversions of G Minor.

=== II. Allegro, ma non agitato ===
The second movement (2/4, G minor) is most reminiscent to a scherzo featuring two trios, but identified as Alternativo I and II. Similar to the beginning of the first movement, the piano and cello (instead of the violin) start on the note D, and make their way to the tonic much quicker with three ascending notes highlighting a harmonic minor. The piano then starts the first theme in the anacrusis to measure 9. In the first Alternativo, both the cello and violin have similar thematic material during their respective espressivos that are both repeated twice. In the second Alternativo, a sharp contrast is made in volume as all three instruments have a much louder chordal texture featuring a new rhythmic motive (dotted eighth/sixteenth) included. This second Alternativo is a premonition to the funeral march in the final movement. As the final reiteration of the A-section returns, there is a chromatic interjection quoting from the first movement before ending in the key of G major.

=== III. Presto ===
The final movement (6/8, G minor) is the movement most strikingly similar to Smetana's Sonata in G minor (4th movement, Finale molto vivace). The first theme and the two-versus-three figures are nearly identical. The scoring accommodates the violin and cello as accompaniment figures to the piano until the arrival of the second theme. The second theme starts initially with the cello quoting a variant of the second theme of the first movement. The violin plays a variation of this, followed by the piano's cadenza-like variation. After this, the second theme takes another form in the "Più mosso" section that transitions back to the first "two-versus-three" theme. After a more chordal version of the first theme, there is a reiteration of the second theme which has more of an improvisatory like accompaniment provided by the piano. Following the additional "Più mosso" section, the piano starts playing the first theme in a more block-chord format which will then transition the ensemble into a short funeral march written in 2/4 and 6/8. After this march, the second theme is reiterated one last time in the major mode with arpeggios as textural accompaniment. The piece concludes as the first theme is reiterated with an altered ending in the key of G major.

== Reception ==
There were mixed feelings in the initial 1855 premiere, but Franz Liszt had enjoyed it separately when paying a visit to Smetana in Bohemia. Motivated by Liszt's endorsement, Smetana revised his work to a much warmer reception in Sweden. He would go on to publish his work in 1880.

== Discography ==
- Lev Oborin, piano; David Oistrakh, violin; Sviatoslav Knushevitsky, cello (studio recording, Moscow, 1950)
- Daniil Trifonov, piano; Leonidas Kavakos, violin; Gautier Capuçon, cello; Verbier Festival, Switzerland, 2016; Deutsche Grammophon
