= String Quartet No. 2 (Smetana) =

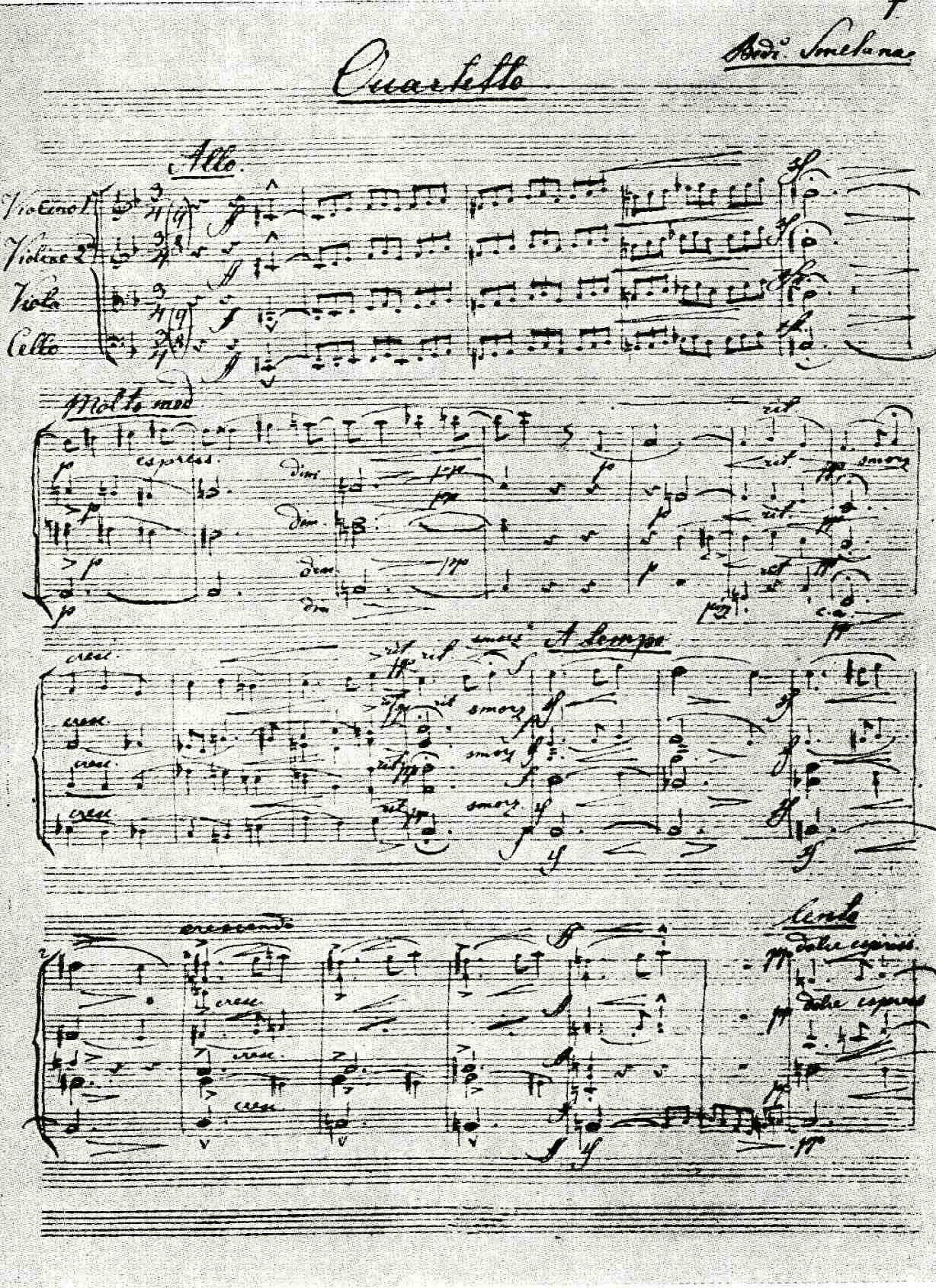
The first page of the autograph score of Smetana's second string quartet

Bedřich Smetana's String Quartet No. 2 in D minor is a chamber composition for string quartet. It is Smetana's second and final quartet, written between 1882 and 1883.

== Background ==
In June 1882, after composing the monumental cycle Má vlast, the operas Tajemství (The Secret), Čertova stěna (The Devil's Wall) and other works, Smetana began thinking about the creation of his second string quartet. A month later, he finished the first movement. In a letter to his friend Josef Srba, the deaf and dejected composer presents the difficulties with the work, his misgivings and fears. He continued work very slowly, and the whole composition was not finished until 12 March 1883. Several minor changes were made after the work was completed. Smetana attended the first non-public performance in the spring (April?) of 1883. The first public performance took place on 3 January 1884, at the Konvikt Hall in Prague, performed by Ferdinand Lachner, Julius Raušer, Josef Krehan and Alois Neruda.

The quartet was published posthumously, in 1889.

== Structure ==
The composition consists of four movements:

1. Allegro
2. Allegro moderato
3. Allegro non più moderato, ma agitato e con fuoco
4. Presto

Smetana said that the second quartet takes up from where his first finished: "...after the catastrophe, it represents the turbulence of music in a person who had lost his hearing". The musical construction and language are entirely new and unusual. Its discontinuities and sudden outbursts caused even Smetana himself doubts; he wrote of the first movement, "It has a very unusual form and is difficult to understand. A kind of breakdown prevails throughout the movement and will cause, so it seems to me, the players extreme difficulty."

At first, the composition was received by listeners and critics with hesitation, even with objections. However, thanks to many successful interpretations (by, for example, the Czech Quartet, the Smetana Quartet, and the Janáček Quartet), the quartet is now highly regarded within Czech music history and culture.
