= Viola (opera) =

19th-century opera fragment by Bedřich Smetana

- Opera by Bedřich Smetana
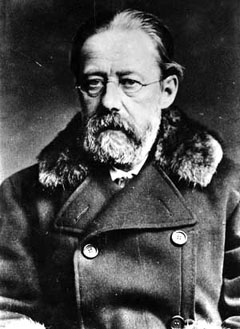
- The composer around 1883
- Librettist: Eliška Krásnohorská
- Language: Czech
- Based on: Shakespeare's play Twelfth Night
- Premiere: 11 May 1924; National Theatre, Prague

Viola is an unfinished romantic opera by Bedřich Smetana. The libretto was written by Eliška Krásnohorská, and is based on Shakespeare's play Twelfth Night. The composer did some work on it in 1874 and then came back to it in 1883, when he only managed to orchestrate a few scenes; the opera was left incomplete upon Smetana's death in 1884.

== Performance history ==
A concert performance (of the unfinished work) was given on 15 March 1900 and it was staged at the Prague National Theatre on 11 May 1924.

== Roles ==
Roles, voice types
Role	Voice type
Orsino, Duke of Illyria	tenor
Viola, twin sister to Sebastian	mezzo-soprano
Sebastian, twin brother to Viola	soprano
Olivie	mezzo-soprano
Tobiáš	baritone
Ondřej	tenor
Malvolio	baritone
Marie	soprano
Šašek	baritone
Antonio, a captain	bass
Marko, an old fisherman	bass

== Recordings ==
- 1982, Zdeněk Košler (conductor), Prague National Theatre Orchestra and Chorus; Jiří Pokorný (Piano), Marie Veselá, Drahomíra Drobková, Dalibor Jedlička, Jaroslav Horáček, Miroslav Švejda, Karel Hanuš
