= Jabkenice =

- Municipality
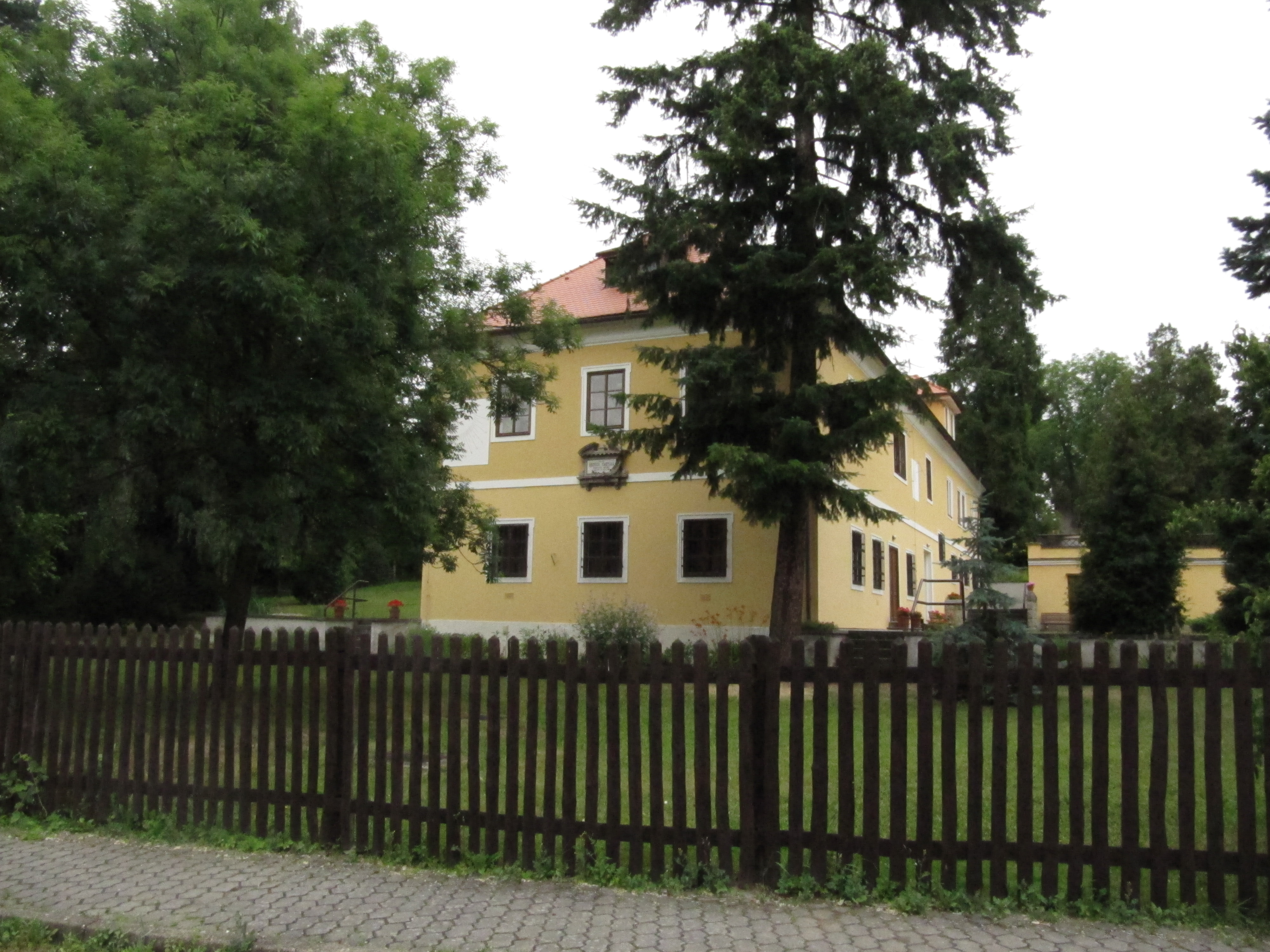
- Memorial of Bedřich Smetana

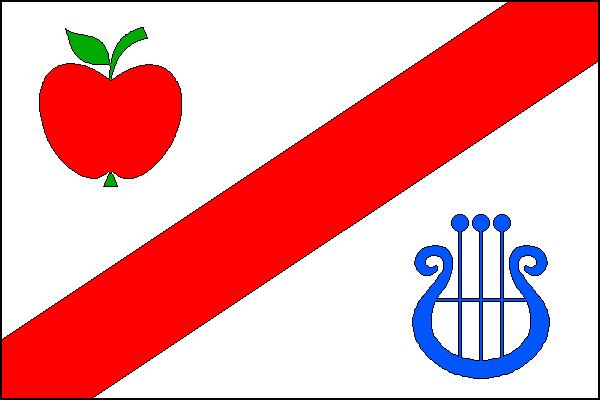
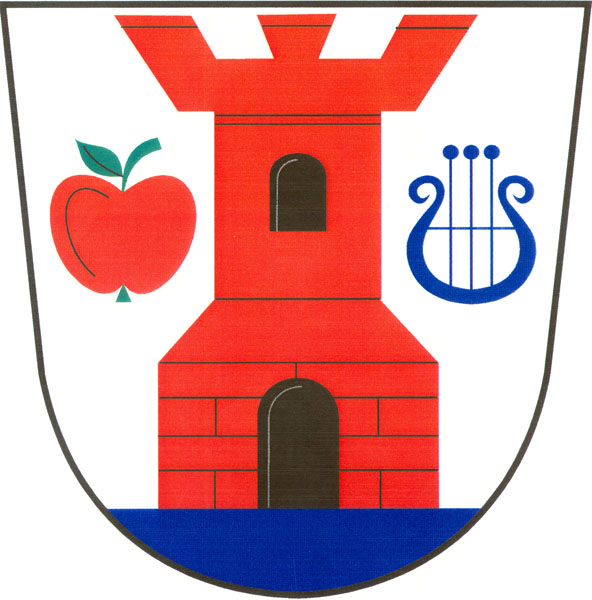
- Flag Coat of arms

- Location in the Czech Republic
- Coordinates: 50°19′27″N 15°0′53″E
- Country: Czech Republic
- Region: Central Bohemian
- District: Mladá Boleslav
- First mentioned: 1352

Area
  - Total: 11.86 km^{2} (4.58 sq mi)
- Elevation: 230 m (750 ft)

Population (2026-01-01)
  - Total: 495
  - Density: 41.7/km^{2} (108/sq mi)
- Time zone: UTC+1 (CET)
  - Summer (DST): UTC+2 (CEST)
- Postal code: 294 45
- Website: www.jabkenice.cz

Jabkenice is a municipality and village in Mladá Boleslav District in the Central Bohemian Region of the Czech Republic. It has about 500 inhabitants.

== Etymology ==
The name was probably derived from the Czech words jablko ('apple') and jabloň ('apple tree').

== Geography ==
Jabkenice is located about 12 kilometres (7 mi) south of Mladá Boleslav and 41 km (25 mi) northeast of Prague. It lies in a flat landscape in the Jizera Table. The brook Jabkenický potok flows through the municipality and supplies a system of fishponds.

== History ==
The first written mention of Jabkenice is from 1352. From 1924 to 1950, it was called Jablkynice.

== Demographics ==
Historical population

Year	Pop.	±%
1869	437	—
1880	480	+9.8%
1890	524	+9.2%
1900	517	−1.3%
1910	478	−7.5%

Year	Pop.	±%
1921	514	+7.5%
1930	498	−3.1%
1950	399	−19.9%
1961	437	+9.5%
1970	435	−0.5%

Year	Pop.	±%
1980	401	−7.8%
1991	387	−3.5%
2001	372	−3.9%
2011	374	+0.5%
2021	468	+25.1%

Source: Censuses

== Transport ==
There are no railways or major roads passing through the municipality.

== Sights ==
The main landmark of Jabkenice is the Church of the Nativity of the Virgin Mary. It is a Gothic cemetery church from the 13th century. Next to the church is a separate wooden bell tower.

Jabkenice Lodge next to a large game park was built for the Thurn und Taxis family as the seat of the forestry office. The building became known as the last residence of Bedřich Smetana, who wrote some of his most famous works here. Today, the Bedřich Smetana Memorial with a museum about his life and work is located here.

== Notable people ==
- Bedřich Smetana (1824–1884), composer; lived and worked here in 1875–1884
