= List of compositions by Josef Bohuslav Foerster =

Below is a list of compositions by Josef Bohuslav Foerster sorted by genre, opus number, date of composition, original and English titles.

Genre	Opus	Composition date	Czech title (original title)	English title	Scoring	Notes
Opera	41	1890–1891	Debora	Debora		in 3 acts; libretto by Jaroslav Kvapil after Salomon Hermann Mosenthal
Opera	50	1895–1897	Eva	Eva		in 3 acts; libretto by the composer after the 1889 play Gazdina roba by Gabriela Preissová
Opera	60 (68)	1902–1904 revised 1906	Jessika	Jessika		in 3 acts; libretto by Jaroslav Vrchlický after The Merchant of Venice by William Shakespeare
Opera	100	1917	Nepřemožení	The Invincible Ones		in 4 acts; libretto by the composer; first sketches date from 1906
Opera	122	1921–1922	Srdce	The Heart		in 2 acts with prologue and epilogue; libretto by the composer
Opera	158	1935–1936	Bloud	The Fool (a.k.a. The Simpleton)		in 7 scenes; libretto by the composer based on the 1885 short story Two Old Men by Leo Tolstoy
Melodrama	21	1889	Tři jezdci	The Three Riders	for narrator and piano	words by Jaroslav Vrchlický
Melodrama	30a	1897	Amarus	Amarus	for narrator and piano	words by Jaroslav Vrchlický
Melodrama	31	1890–1895	Faustulus	Faustulus		
Melodrama	34		Legenda o svaté Julii	The Legend of St. Julia	for narrator and piano	words by Jaroslav Vrchlický
Melodrama	40b	1905	Norská ballada	Norwegian Ballad	for narrator and piano	words after the novel Román o věrném přátelství Amise a Amila by Julius Zeyer
Melodrama	111a	1921	Tří králové	Three Kings	for narrator and piano	words by Josef Václav Sládek
Melodrama	111d	1921	Mše biskupa Turpina	The Mass of Bishop Turpin	for narrator and piano	words by Jaroslav Vrchlický
Melodrama	149a	1942–1943	Carçamon	Carçamon	for narrator and piano	words by Henry A. Beers in translation by Josef Václav Sládek
Melodrama	149b		Pan učitel	The Teacher	for narrator and piano	words by Renata Horaová
Melodrama	155a	1934	Romance štědrovečerní	A Christmas Eve Romance	for narrator and piano	words by Jan Neruda
Melodrama		1936	Stín	The Shadow	for narrator and piano	
Melodrama	162	1940	Tří melodramy: 1. Cikánské děcko 2. Laň; 3. Sníh	3 Melodramas: 1. The Gypsy Child; 2. The Doe; 3. Snow	for narrator and piano	1.~2. words by Josef Václav Sládek; 3. words by Jaroslav Vrchlický
Melodrama	176a	1934	Kejklíř	The Juggler	for narrator and piano or orchestra	words by Otokar Fischer; orchestrated in 1949
Incidental music	35	1897	Princezna Pampeliška	Princess Dandelion		for the play by Jaroslav Kvapil
Incidental music	64	1901	Šípková Růženka	Sleeping Beauty		
Incidental music	62	1906	Trilogie o Simsonovi	Simson Trilogy		for the dramatic poem by Jaroslav Vrchlický
Incidental music			Strakonický dudák	The Bagpiper of Strakonice		for the play by Josef Kajetán Tyl; for voices and orchestra
Incidental music	116e	1922	Večer Tříkrálový	Twelfth Night		for the play by William Shakespeare
Incidental music	116f	1927	Julius Caesar	Julius Caesar		for the play by William Shakespeare
Orchestral	–	1884	Slovanská fantazie	Slavonic Fantasy	for orchestra	
Orchestral	7	1884	V horách	In the Mountains	for chamber orchestra	Suite
Orchestral	9	1887–1888	Symfonie č. 1 d moll	Symphony No. 1 in D minor	for orchestra	
Orchestral	–	1891	Suita c moll	Suite in C minor	for orchestra	
Orchestral	25		Při západu, Dvě notturna	At Sunset, 2 Nocturnes	for orchestra	
Orchestral	29	1892–1893	Symfonie č. 2 F dur	Symphony No. 2 in F major	for orchestra	
Orchestral	36	1894–1895	Symfonie č. 3 D dur „Život“	Symphony No. 3 "Life" in D major	for orchestra	
Orchestral	44	1900	Mé mládí	My Youth	for orchestra	Symphonic poem
Orchestral	54	1905	Symfonie č. 4 c moll „Veliká noc“	Symphony No. 4 "Easter Eve" in C minor	for orchestra	
Orchestral	55	1903	Cyrano de Bergerac	Cyrano de Bergerac	for orchestra	Suite
Orchestral	58	1895	Tragická ouvertura	Tragic Overture	for orchestra	
Orchestral	59	1903	Večer v Belmontu	Evening in Belmont	for orchestra	
Orchestral	70	1907	Slavnostní předehra	Festive Prelude	for orchestra	
Orchestral	76	1908–1909	Ze Shakespeara: 1. Introduzione; 2. Perdita; 3. Viola; 4. Lady Mackbeth; 5. Katharina, Petruchio a Eros	From Shakespeare: 1. Introduction; 2. Perdita; 3. Viola; 4. Lady Macbeth; 5. Katherina, Petruchio and Eros	for orchestra	Suite
Orchestral	83	1909	Legenda o štěstí	Legend of Happiness	for orchestra	
Orchestral	84	1911	Jaro	Spring	for orchestra	
Orchestral	93	1912	Jaro a touha	Springtime and Desire	for orchestra	Symphonic poem
Orchestral	124	1923	Jičínská suita	Jičín Suite	for orchestra	also for piano
Orchestral	141	1924–1929	Symfonie č. 5 d moll	Symphony No. 5 in D minor	for orchestra	
Concertante	88	1910–1911	Houslový koncert č. 1 c moll	Concerto No. 1 in C minor	for violin and orchestra	
Concertante	104	1925–1926	Houslový koncert č. 2 d moll	Concerto No. 2 in D minor	for violin and orchestra	
Concertante	143	1930	Koncert pro violoncello a orchestr	Concerto	for cello and orchestra	
Concertante	183b	1945–1946	Capriccio pro sólovou flétnu a malý orchestr	Capriccio	for flute and chamber orchestra	
Chamber music	3	1886	Smyčcový kvintet	String Quintet	for 2 violins, viola, cello and double bass	
Chamber music	8	1883	Klavírní trio č. 1 f moll	Piano Trio No. 1 in F minor	for violin, cello and piano	
Chamber music	15	1888	Smyčcový kvartet č. 1 E dur	String Quartet No. 1 in E major	for 2 violins, viola and cello	
Chamber music	10	1889	Houslová sonáta h moll	Sonata in B minor	for violin and piano	
Chamber music	35a	1897	Princezna Pampeliška, Suita pro housle a klavír	Princess Dandelion, Suite	for violin and piano	after the incidental music for the play by Jaroslav Kvapil
Chamber music		1894	Allegro giocoso pro smyčcové kvarteto	Allegro giocoso	for 2 violins, viola and cello	
Chamber music	38	1894	Klavírní trio č. 2 B dur	Piano Trio No. 2 in B♭ major	for violin, cello and piano	
Chamber music	39	1893	Smyčcový kvartet č. 2 D dur	String Quartet No. 2 in D major	for 2 violins, viola and cello	
Chamber music	45	1898	Sonáta pro violoncello a klavír č. 1 f moll	Sonata No. 1 in F minor	for cello and piano	
Chamber music	61	1907	Smyčcový kvartet č. 3 C dur	String Quartet No. 3 in C major	for 2 violins, viola and cello	revised 1913
Chamber music	92	1914	Ballata pro housle a klavír	Ballade	for violin and piano	
Chamber music	95	1909	Dechový kvintet	Woodwind Quintet	for flute, oboe, clarinet, bassoon and horn	
Chamber music	105	1919–1921	Klavírní trio č. 3 a moll	Piano Trio No. 3 in A minor	for violin, cello and piano	
Chamber music	128	1925	Fantasie pro housle a klavír	Fantasie	for violin and piano	
Chamber music	130	1926	Sonáta pro violoncello a klavír č. 2 c moll	Sonata No. 2 in C minor	for cello and piano	
Chamber music	138	1928	Komorní hudba pro klavír a smyčcový kvartet	Chamber Music	for 2 violins, viola, cello and piano	
Chamber music	147	1931	Nonet: variace o dvou thematech	Nonet: Variations on Two Themes	for flute, oboe, clarinet, bassoon, horn, violin, viola, cello and double bass	
Chamber music	154	1934	Dvě impromptu pro housle a klavír	2 Impromptus	for violin and piano	
Chamber music	167	1940	Zbirožská suita pro violu a klavír	Zbiroh Suite	for viola and piano	
Chamber music	177	1943	Sonata quasi una fantasia pro housle a klavír	Sonata quasi una fantasia	for violin and piano	
Chamber music	182	1944	Smyčcový kvartet č. 4 F dur	String Quartet No. 4 in F major	for 2 violins, viola and cello	
Chamber music	183a	1944	Malá suita pro dvoje housle	Little Suite	for 2 violins	
Chamber music	–	1945	Elegie pro housle sólo	Elegie	for violin solo	manuscript
Chamber music		1950–1951	Smyčcový kvartet č. 5 F dur „Vestecký“	String Quartet No. 5 "Vestec" in F major	for 2 violins, viola and cello	
Chamber music	183	published posth. 1953	Malá suita pro troje housle	Little Suite	for 3 violins	
Chamber music			Melodie	Melodie	for cello and piano	
Harmonium	6	1896	Čtyři skladby	4 Pieces	for harmonium	
Organ	14	1896	Fantasie C dur	Fantasie in C major	for organ	
Organ	135	1927	Impromptu	Impromptu	for organ	
Piano	4	1887	Jarní nálady	Spring Moods	for piano	3 Pieces
Piano	5	1885	Allegro a Scherzo	Allegro and Scherzo	for piano	
Piano	17	1885	Miniatury	Miniatures	for piano	
Piano	18b	1890	Listy z mého deníku	Pages from My Diary	for piano	
Piano	33		Lyrické skladby	Lyric Pieces	for piano 4-hands	
Piano	47	1898	Snění	Dreaming	for piano	
Piano	49	1902	Růže vzpomínek	Roses of Memories	for piano	Cycle of 6 piano pieces
Piano	79	1904	Hudba večera	Evening Music	for piano	
Piano	52	1905	A jabloně kvetly	And Apple Trees Were in Bloom	for piano	
Piano	48	1906	Taneční skicy	Dance Sketches	for piano	
Piano	73	1907–1909	Imprese	Impressions	for piano	
Piano	72	1908–1909	Skladby pro mého synáčka	Compositions for My Son	for piano	
Piano	98	1912	Erotovy masky	Masks of Eros	for piano 4-hands	
Piano	124	1924	Jičínská suita o čtyřech větách	Jičín Suite	for piano	in 4 movements; also for orchestra
Piano	129	1926	Osenická suita	Osenice Suite	for piano	
Piano		1926	Stopy ve sněhu, 2 nálady ve snazším slohu	Footprints in the Snow: 2 Easy Mood Pieces	for piano 4-hands	
Piano	136	1927	Črty uhlem	Charcoal sketches	for piano	Cycle of piano pieces
Piano	142		Notturno fantastico, dvě klavírní skladby pro levou ruku	Notturno fantastico, 2 Pieces	for piano left-hand	
Piano	153b	1939	Den	Day	for piano	
Vocal	2	1882	Pět písní ve slohu národním: 1. Na tej našej střeše 2. Rostó, rostó konopě za cestó 3. Proč, kalino, v struze stojíš?; 4. Rozmarýn; 5. Děvečko chudobná	5 Songs in Folk Style	for voice (baritone) and piano	
Vocal	11	1886–1888	Písně jarní a podzimní	Songs of Spring and Autumn		
Vocal	12	1888	Petrklíče, Čtyři písně: 1. Jako čerstvá ze studánky 2. Když jsme prvně sami byli 3. S petrklíčem 4. Louky, háje už se stměly	Primroses, 4 Songs	for soprano and piano	words by Josef Václav Sládek, John Paulsen and Svatopluk Čech
Vocal	22	1895	Čtyři písně	4 Songs	for medium voice and piano	
Vocal	23		Erotikon, 4 písně pro vyšší hlas a klavír: 1. To jen mi dej 2. V máji 3. Jen víru měj 4. Jak čarné je	Erotikon: 4 Songs	for high voice and piano	
Vocal	24	1890–1895	Tři písně	3 Songs	for voice and piano	1. folk text 2. words by Karl Stieler; 3. words by Jaroslav Vrchlický
Vocal	26	1896	Polní květy	Wild Flowers		
Vocal	27	1895	Tři písně	3 Songs	for medium voice and piano	
Vocal	32		Vzpomínky	Souvenirs		
Vocal	42		Písně soumraku: 1. Ta láska 2. Opuštěná; 3. Jak krásný ten svět 4. Lesem; 5. Zřím krásnou ruku jak v struny hrá 6. Modlitba	Twilight Songs	for voice and piano	1.~5. translations by Karel Burian; 1. words by Rainer Maria Rilke; 2. words by Ernst Eckstein; 3. words by Heinrich Heine; 4. words by Martin Greif; 5. words by Paul Verlaine; 6. words by Jaroslav Vrchlický
Vocal	43		Nachtviolen			4 Lieder aus dem Zyklus Eine Liebe von G. Falke
Vocal	46	1899–1900	Láska	Love: Song Cycle	for voice and piano	words by Gustav Falke in translation by Josef Theurer and Karel Burian
Vocal	60		Čtyři písně: 1. Na loutnu 2. Jarní den 3. Snílkové; 4. Ballada	4 Songs	for voice and piano	1. words by Johann Friedrich Rochlitz; 2. words by Carl Siebel (1836–1868); 3. words by Paul Bornstein; 4. words by Hedda Rzach Sauer (1875–1953)
Vocal	65		Sen jarní noci: 1. Z jara 2. Pozdrav; 3. Nesmím ji milovat 4. Má Lilie; 5. Marii; 6. Marné sny 7. Vhoď v moje srdce kotvu 8. Zvuky a bolesti	A Spring Night's Dream	for voice and piano	words by Robert Hamerling
Vocal	69	1900–1902	Zářivé dni: 1. Zářivé dni 2. Snění; 3. Útěcha noci 4. Domů	Brilliant Days	for voice and piano	words by Ludwig Jacobowski (1868–1900)
Vocal	78		Mučenka, 6 písní	Passionflower: 6 Songs	for voice and piano	
Vocal	81	1909	Démon láska	The Devil Love	for voice and piano	words by Jaroslav Vrchlický
Vocal	85	1910	Písně na slova K. H. Máchy: 1. Večerní zvon 2. Jarní píseň	Songs on Words by Mácha	for voice and piano	words by Karel Hynek Mácha
Vocal	90		Bílé růže, 4 písně	White Roses: 4 Songs	for voice and piano	words by Jaroslav Kvapil
Vocal	91	1912	Dvě písně s violou a klavírem	2 Songs	for voice, viola and piano	
Vocal	96	1914	Milostné písně na slova Rabindranátha Thákura: 1. Ó netaj v srdci 2. Každý den 3. Mé srdce 4. Já světa vzala květ 5. Lásko má	Love Songs on Words by Rabindranath Tagore	for voice and piano or orchestra	words by Rabindranath Tagore
Vocal	97	1915	Drei Lieder aus der Kriegszeit: 1. Und die Kugel traf 2. Draußen im weiten Krieg; 3. Nacht im Felde	3 Songs from the War	for medium voice and piano	1. words by Gustav Falke; 2. words by Christian Morgenstern; 3. words by Ernst Lothar
Vocal	101	1910	Pohádka o dlouhé touze, soubor 15 písní na slova Josefa Merhauta: 1. Notturno I 2. Nové jaro 3. Jste duše silná 4. Cestou; 5. Notturno II; 6. Notturno III; 7. Vždy v ráno jarní 8. Červený slunečník 9. Notturno IV; 10. Hvězdy; 11. Píseň beze slov 12. Notturno V 13. Podzim; 14. Mlhy; 15. Notturno poslední	Fairy-Tale of a Long Craving: 15 Songs	for voice and piano	words by Josef Merhaut (1863–1907)
Vocal	107	1914–1918	Čisté jitro, 3 zpěvy pro sólový hlas a orchestr	Pure Morning: 3 Songs	for voice and orchestra	words by Otokar Březina, Antonín Sova and František Xaver Šalda
Vocal	109a	1911	Dva motivy z Jana Nerudy	2 Motifs of Jan Neruda	for voice and piano	words by Jan Neruda
Vocal	109b	1897–1912	Tři modlitby	3 Prayers	for voice and piano	words by Maurice Maeterlinck, Paul Fleming and Mikhail Lermontov
Vocal	125a		Dva žalmy	2 Psalms	for medium voice and organ (or harmonium, or piano)	
Vocal	126		Co zpívá večer, Cyklus písní		for voice and piano	
Vocal	127	1897–1898	Zpívající noc	A Night for Singing		
Vocal	132	1924	Kvetoucí magnólie, 5 písní	Flowering Magnolia: 5 Songs	for voice and piano	words by Vítězslav Hálek
Vocal			Ó, jen se dívej		for voice and piano	
Vocal			Oči		for voice and piano	
Vocal			V deštivé chvíli	In a Rainy Time	for voice and piano	
Vocal		1927	Ballada horská	Mountain Ballad	for voice and piano	words by Jan Neruda
Vocal	142	1932–1940	Šest zpěvů	6 Songs	for voice and piano	
Vocal	144		1. Vyrovnání; 2. Tam na oltáři 3. V Indickém moři 4. Břízy; 5. Oblačný pták 6. Tak bude stát		for voice and piano	
Vocal	157		1. Dolorosa; 2. Sursum corda		for voice, violin, cello and organ	2. words by Karel Bohdan Ort
Vocal			Ježíšek	Father Christmas		
Vocal	161	1937	Šest písní na básně A.S. Puškina: 1. Já měl vás rád 2. Své sny jsem přežil 3. Prozaik a básník 4. Do alba 5. Ptáček; 6. Elegie	6 Songs on Poems of Alexander Pushkin	for medium voice and piano	words by Aleksander Pushkin in translation by Petr Křička
Vocal	163	1939	Tři notturna: 1. Notturno; 2. Měsíčná noc 3. Všecky smutky pominou	3 Nocturnes: 1. Notturno; 2. Moonlit Night; 3. All Sadness Passes	for voice, cello and piano	1. words by the composer 2. words by František Xaver Svoboda; 3. words by Jan Rokyta
Vocal	165a	1941–1942	Šest písní na slova českých básníků: 1. Notturno; 2. Vzpomínka; 3. Polibky; 4. Oblaka; 5. Jak Drahokam; 6. Dej ...	6 Songs on Words of Czech Poets	for voice and piano	1.~2. words by Josef Václav Sládek; 3. words by Jaroslav Vrchlický; 4. words by Jaroslav Kvapil; 5.~6. words by Jaroslav Vrchlický
Vocal	180	1943	Poslední písně F.X. Svobody	The Last Songs of František Xaver Svoboda	for voice and piano	words by František Xaver Svoboda
Vocal	181	1938	Tři zpěvy	3 Songs: 1. Hudba; 2. In memoriam Alexandry Čvanové; 3. Pobídka	for voice and orchestra	1. words by Jaroslav Vrchlický; 2. words by Jaroslav Vyplel; 3. words by František Xaver Šalda
Vocal	184	1945–1946	Rozmarné písně	Whimsical Songs	for voice and piano	
Vocal	186	1945	U bran štěstí	At the Gates of Happiness	for voice and piano	words by Josef Václav Sládek
Vocal	189	1948	Písně červnových dnů: 1. Ty's klid a mír 2. Večer v Lužanech; 3. Nad kolébkou 4. Kdyby Bůh byl chtěl 5. Za dvacet let 6. Píseň Luciova	Songs of June Days	for voice and piano	words by the composer, William Shakespeare and Josef Václav Sládek
Vocal			Praze, 3 písně: 1. Město usíná 2. Láska; 3. Praze	To Prague: 3 Songs	for voice and piano	1. words by Nina Tučková; 2. words by Karel Toman; 3. words by Jan Grmela
Choral	13	1889	Hymnus andělů	Hymn of the Angels	for mixed chorus and orchestra	words by Svatopluk Čech
Choral	16	1889	Tři smíšené sbory	3 Mixed Choruses	for mixed chorus	words by Josef Václav Sládek
Choral	18		Tři starosvětské písničky: 1. Soumrak; 2. Dudák; 3. Rychtář	3 Old-World Songs	for male chorus	
Choral	19	1889	Tři selské písně	3 Village Songs	for male chorus	words by Josef Václav Sládek
Choral	20	1889	Dva mužské sbory: 1. Až já budu v hrobě spát 2. Dá-li Bůh	2 Male Choruses	for male chorus	words by Josef Václav Sládek
Choral	30	1889	Česká píseň	Czech Song	for mixed chorus	words by Jaroslav Kvapil
Choral	32		Tě Boha chválíme, ambrosianský chvalozpěv (in falso bordone)		for mixed chorus and organ	
Choral	37	1894–1897	Devět mužských sborů: 1. Oráč; 2. Mé orné půdy každý hon 3. Píseň jarní 4. Velké, širé, rodné lány 5. Polní cestou 6. Skřivánkovi; 7. Z osudu rukou 8. Stav si, vlaštovičko, hnízdo 9. Když jsme se loučili	9 Male Choruses	for male chorus	one edition erroneously designated Op. 47; 1. words by Karel Dostál-Lutinov; 2. words by Josef Václav Sládek; 3. words by Jaroslav Kvapil; 4.~9. words by Josef Václav Sládek
Choral	56	1891–1892	Stabat Mater	Stabat Mater	for mixed chorus, orchestra and organ	
Choral	57		Dva ženské čtverozpěvy: 1. Panna; 2. Fialy	3 Female Quartets	for 4 female voices and piano	
Choral	63	1901–1907	Šest mužských sborů : No. 3 Hymnus	6 Male Choruses	for double male chorus	3. words by Josef Václav Sládek
Choral	68	1932	Písně k svatým patronům českým	Songs for Czech Patron Saints		
Choral	71	1901	Modlitba na moři	Prayer to the Sea	for mixed chorus	words by Moritz von Strachwitz and Vladimír Hornof
Choral	74		Dva ženské čtverozpěvy: 1. V koutečku u zdi 2. Tiše	3 Female Quartets	for 4 female voices and piano	words by Josef Václav Sládek
Choral	77	1898; 1909	Dva sbory pro smíšené hlasy s průvodem klavíru: 1. Skon; 2. Jarní noc	2 Choruses: 1. Passing; 2. Jarní noc	for mixed voices and piano	1. words by Heinrich Heine in translation by Václav Juda Novotný
Choral	82	1885	Tři dvojzpěvy	3 Duets		
Choral	86	1910	Svatý Václave!	Saint Wenceslas!	for male chorus	words by Josef Václav Sládek
Choral	87	1910–1911	Ženské sbory: 1. Posvěcení noci 2. Most vzdechů	Female Choruses: 1. Blessing of the Night; 2. Bridge of Sighs	for female chorus and orchestra	1. words by Christian Friedrich Hebbel; 2. words by Thomas Hood in translation by Josef Václav Sládek
Choral	89		Dětské sbory: 1. Lesní studánka 2. Krokodýl; 3. Pes a kotě 4. Oříšek; 5. Rodičům	5 Children's Choruses	for children's chorus a cappella	1. words by Josef Václav Sládek; 2. words by Karel Toman; 3.~5. words by Josef Václav Sládek
Choral	94	1913–1916	Pět mužských sborů na církevní texty	5 Male Choruses on Church Texts	for male chorus	
Choral	102	1920–1921	Devět mužských sborů	9 Male Choruses	for male chorus	words by Josef Václav Sládek and Jaroslav Vrchlický
Choral	108	1918	Mrtvým bratřím	To the Dead Brothers	for soloists, mixed chorus, orchestra and organ	biblical words, and by Karl Gerok, Josef Merhaut, Jaroslav Vrchlický and Rabindranath Tagore
Choral	110	1919–1920	Co podzim dal			
Choral	112	1920–1921	Vzhůru, spáči! No. 4 Pražské zvony No. 5 Večerní obraz No. 6 Ledová královna No. 6 Život	Arise, Sleepers! No. 4 The Bells of Prague No. 5 Evening Picture No. 6 The Ice Queen No. 6 Life	for mixed chorus and orchestra (or piano)	words by Josef Václav Sládek
Choral	114	1920–1923	Zpěvy večera: 1. Na podzim 2. Do památníku 3. Vzkaz do hor 4. Prosba o pokoj 5. Za matkou 6. Syn; 7. Večer; 8. Ženci	Evening Songs	for male chorus	
Choral	115		Bílá, červená, modrá: tři ženské sbory	White, Red, Blue: 3 Female Choruses	for female chorus a cappella	
Choral	117	1913	Čtyři bohatýři	Four Heroes	for mixed chorus and orchestra	words by Josef Václav Sládek
Choral	118		Sluncem a stínem	In Sun and Shadow		
Choral	119	1919	Česká píseň mešní	Czech Mass Song		
Choral	121	1900	No. 3 Ze země jsem na zem přišel No. 4 Gethsemane		for mixed chorus	16th century words
Choral	123	1923	Glagolská mše	Glagolitic Mass	for mixed chorus and organ	
Choral	125	1923–1924	Duchovní písně	Spiritual Songs		
Choral	131	1925–1926	Missa in honorem S. Francisci Assisiensis		for mixed chorus and organ	
Choral	134	1927–1928	Oblačný pták	Cloud Bird	for mixed chorus	words by Rudolf Krupička
Choral	140	1928	Svatý Václav, Kantáta o třech dílech	Saint Wenceslas, Cantata in 3 parts	for soloists, chorus, orchestra and organ	words by Antonín Klášterský
Choral	145	1930–1931	Sborové písně	Choral Songs		
Choral	146	1931	Te Deum	Te Deum		
Choral	151b	1936	Srdci mému	To My Heart	for mixed chorus and orchestra (or piano)	words by Karel Hynek Mácha
Choral	157	1936	Hymnus k Panně Marii	Hymn to the Virgin Mary		
Choral	159	1936	Máj	May	for baritone, narrator, male chorus and orchestra	words by Karel Hynek Mácha
Choral	160		Betlehem	Bethlehem	for mixed chorus, violin, cello, harp (or piano) and organ (or harmonium)	words by the composer after an old chorale
Choral	164	1932	Matičce	To Mother		
Choral	166		Pět zpěvů pro dětský nebo ženský sbor a klavír	5 Songs	for children's or female chorus and piano	
Choral	168	1941	Smuteční písně	Songs of Mourning		
Choral	169		Tři sbory pohřební	5 Funeral Choruses	for male chorus	
Choral	170	1940	Missa in honorem Sanctissimae Trinitatis	Missa in honorem Sanctissimae Trinitatis	for mixed chorus and organ	
Choral	171	1925–1944	Dvanáct sborů pro mužské hlasy na básně J. V. Sládka	12 Choruses on Poems of J.V. Sládek	for male chorus	words by Josef Václav Sládek
Choral	173	1944	Píseň bratra Slunce	Song of Brother Sun, Cantata	for baritone, male chorus and orchestra	words by Saint Francis of Assisi and Albert Vyskočil
Choral	175	1933–1940	Šest sborů pro smíšené hlasy : No. 5 Kukačka volá	6 Choruses	for mixed chorus	words by Taras Shevchenko, Josef Hora, Rudolf Krupička, Eugen Stoklas
Choral	178	1939	Tři sbory pro ženské hlasy a klavír	3 Female Choruses	for female chorus and piano	
Choral	185	1948	Missa in honorem Beatae Mariae Virginis	Missa in honorem Beatae Mariae Virginis		
Choral	187	1943–1945	Kantáta 1945	Cantata 1945	for soprano, baritone, mixed chorus and orchestra	words by Maria Rafajová and Bohumil Mathesius
Choral	188	1947	Missa in honorem S. Adalberti	Missa in honorem S. Adalberti	for mixed chorus and organ	
