= Jaroslav Vrchlický =

Czech lyrical poet (1853–1912)

- Portrait of Jaroslav Vrchlický by Jan Vilímek
- Born: Emil Bohuslav Frída; 17 February 1853; Louny, Austrian Empire
- Died: 9 September 1912 (aged 59); Domažlice, Austria-Hungary
- Resting place: Slavín
- Education: Charles University
- Occupation: Writer
- Spouse: Ludmila Podlipská
- Children: Eva Vrchlická
- Relatives: Bedřich Frida (brother); Božena Fridová (sister-in-law); Sofie Podlipská (mother in law); Myrtil Frída (great-nephew)
- Writing career
- Notable works: Selské ballady (poetry collection); Noc na Karlštejně (play)

Jaroslav Vrchlický (Czech pronunciation: [ˈjaroslav ˈvr̩xlɪtskiː]; 17 February 1853 – 9 September 1912) was a Czech lyrical poet. He was nominated for the Nobel prize in literature eight times.

== Life ==
He was born Emilius Jakob Frida in Louny. He lived ten years with his uncle, a pastor near Kolín. Here he attended the first years of primary school from 1857 to 1861), and the briefly in Kolín from 1861 to 1862. He studied at a grammar school in Slaný from 1862, where he was a classmate of Václav Beneš Třebízský, also in Prague and in 1872 graduated from Klatovy.

Guided by his uncle's example, Vrchlický joined after graduating from the Prague Archbishop's seminary. But in 1873, he transferred to the Faculty of Arts of Charles-Ferdinand University in Prague, where he studied history, philosophy and Romance philology. During his studies he studied with historian Ernest Denis. His first literary work was printed by editor Sofie Podlipská.

In Prague, he formed friendships with Zikmund Winter, Josef Václav Sládek and Alois Jirásek. They formed the group Lumírovci.

From 1875, he worked as a secretary and tutor to the sons of noble family Montecuccoli-Laderchi, first in Merano, and later Livorno. After returning briefly he worked at the pedagogical institute in Prague in Manor Street. Through the intercession of Leopold, Count von Thun und Hohenstein, in 1877 he was appointed secretary of the Prague Czech Polytechnic, and later became a professor of modern science and was awarded an honorary doctorate.

In 1901 he, along with Antonín Dvořák, was knighted, and Austrian Emperor Franz Joseph I. appointed him a member of the Upper House of the Imperial Council in Vienna. Vrchlický defended the requirement of universal suffrage. He was a member of the Royal Academy of Padua, a member of the Polish Society of Paris and also an honorary citizen of many Czech towns. In 1893 he was appointed professor of European literature at Charles University. He was also a member of the Czech Academy of Sciences and Arts (appointed by the Emperor 20 April 1890). At that time (1903–1904) he also became acquainted with Milan Rastislav Štefánik.

He also wrote epic poetry, plays, prose and literary essays and translated widely from various languages, introducing e.g. Dante, Goethe, Shelley, Baudelaire, Poe, and Whitman to Czech literature. He was one of the main voices in Lumír magazine from 1851.

Vrchlický's life was the subject of a 1997 novel, Za trochu lásky....

== Critical reputation ==
During and even after his life, Vrchlický was never universally positively acknowledged. His foreign orientation became a source of criticism in the late 1870s, he was deemed to be overlooking local thematic and, in effect, the needs of the Czech national life. Eliška Krásnohorská recognized his poetic talent, but had objections to the romantic utilization of foreign sources, which, in her view, didn't contribute to the fight for national independence.

At the beginning of the 1890s, a time when he was considered to be the greatest Czech poet and received numerous official awards, he came into conflict with the younger generation of poets and literary critics, who saw his works as superficial, lacking in originality and heavy with clichés. He was viewed as a symbol of the past, which he took very hard. Examples of these critics are (the three years older) Tomáš Garrigue Masaryk, who only viewed him as a good translator, and F. X. Šalda.

Only in the last period of his artistic creation, when he managed to once more create unconventional verse, was he acknowledged by the younger generation of S.K.Neumann and K.Toman. The generation following (e. g. Viktor Dyk, Lev Blatný and Jaroslav Seifert) subsequently fully understood the merit of his work. Today he is often viewed as one of the greatest Czech poets of all times.

== Works ==
Vrchlický's expansive work contains about 270 volumes, including over 80 poetry collections and 50 plays. Vrchlický tried to prove that Czech is a language that can express everything. He wanted to write poetry that would be comparable to other European works and move the Czech literature to a higher level.

=== Poetry ===
==== Lyric poetry ====
Vrchlický's early poetry expresses his perception of life through natural motifs. It deals with love experiences, youthful pessimism and artistic self-doubt. His reflections are shown in natural imagery, his poems praise the ideals of art and beauty. It is represented mainly by the collections:

- Z hlubin (1875) - mainly love poetry
- Vittoria Colonna (1877) - praise of love and work of aging Michelangelo
- Rok na jihu (1878) - natural and love poetry
- Symfonie (1878) - reflection and loneliness

Romantic and intimate poetry forms an important part of Vrchlický's work. This poetry, initially full of pagan mythology, later very personal, has woman at its focal point. He convincingly expressed all subtleties of romantic relationship and marital and family happiness. It is represented by:

- Eklogy a písně (1880)
- Dojmy a rozmary (1880)
- Poutí k Eldorádu (1882)
- Co život dal (1883)
- Jak táhla mračna (1885)
- Čarovná zahrada (1888)
- Dni a noci (1889)

Some of his collections contain very complicated stanza forms, which he used to enrich Czech poetry. Complex composition is very notable in:

- Hudba v duši (1886) – a combination of sestinas with oriental ghazals and ballades.
- Moje sonáta (1893)
- Zlatý prach (1886 a 1897) – collection consisting of two parts written in different periods, the main form is rondeau

Collections of sonnets form a separate category, which he wrote throughout his life. There is no common theme, but all depict his feeling and emotions:

- Sonety samotáře (1885)
- Nové sonety samotáře (1891)
- Poslední sonety samotáře (1896)

1890s works share a common theme of Vrchlický's existential crisis and express the feelings of melancholy, pessimism, disillusionment and resignation:

- Hořká jádra (1889)
- Brevíř moderního člověka (1891)
- Bodláčí z Parnasu (1893)
- Ẻ morta (1894, 1893)
- Okna v bouři (1894)
- Písně poutníka (1895)
- Než zmlknu docela (1895)
- Pavučiny (1897)
- Skvrny na slunci (1897)

Vrchlický's late works show calm, balance and a new belief in the meaning of life and work. After the previous weakening of creativity his poetry became less pathetic and hasty. The verse is simpler and more melodic.

- Fanfáry a kadence (1906)
- Korálové ostrovy (1908)
- Strom života (1909)

==== Epic poetry ====
- Zlomky epopeje (1878 – 1906)

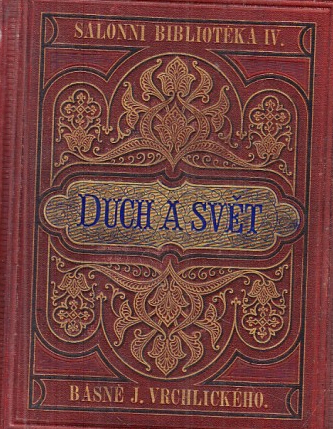
Duch a svět, the first collection belonging to Zlomky epopeje

Freely composed cycle of both epic and lyric poems which tries to depict the advancement of humanity and path towards humanism. The vast poetry collections which contain all most all of Vrchlický's epic poetry are not chronologically sorted.

=== Prose ===
Vrchlický wrote prose only occasionally and mostly short stories.

- Povídky ironické a sentimentální (1886)
- Barevné střepy (1887)
- Nové barevné střepy (1892)
- Loutky (1908) – autobiographical

=== Drama ===
His plays were written for the National Theatre in Prague, which was constructed in his thirties (1881). He wrote more than 30 dramas, some of them as verse drama. He also wrote several librettos with stories from Czech history or foreign literature.

==== Plays ====
- Czech Trilogy – historical plays from Přemyslid dynasty era
1. Drahomíra (1882) Available online
2. Bratři (1889)
3. Knížata (1903) Available online
- Comedy
1. V sudu Diogenově (1883) – single-act romantic comedy about Alexander the Great
2. Soud lásky (1887) – set in 1341 Avignon
3. Pietro Aretino (1892) – renaissance Italian poet is the protagonist, set in Venice
4. A Night at Karlstein (play) – comedy from the Czech environment, which reached high popularity. Based on the false legend, that Charles IV, Holy Roman Emperor forbade presence of women in the Karlštejn castle; made into film in 1973 by Zdeněk Podskalský (A Night at Karlstein (film))
- Historical plays
1. Julián Apostata (1885) – a tragedy about the demise of the ancient world
2. Exulanti (1886) – a story from the post Battle of White Mountain period
3. Smrt Odyssea (1882)
4. Hippodamie (1888–1891) – trilogy, made into music by Zdeněk Fibich

==== Librettos ====
- Svatá Ludmila – set to music as oratorium by Antonín Dvořák
- Jessika – based on Shakespeare's The Merchant of Venice set to music by J. B. Foerster
- Armida – opera by Antonín Dvořák
- Bouře – opera by Zdeněk Fibich
