= Symphony No. 8 (Dvořák) =

Symphony by Antonín Dvořák

- by Antonín Dvořák
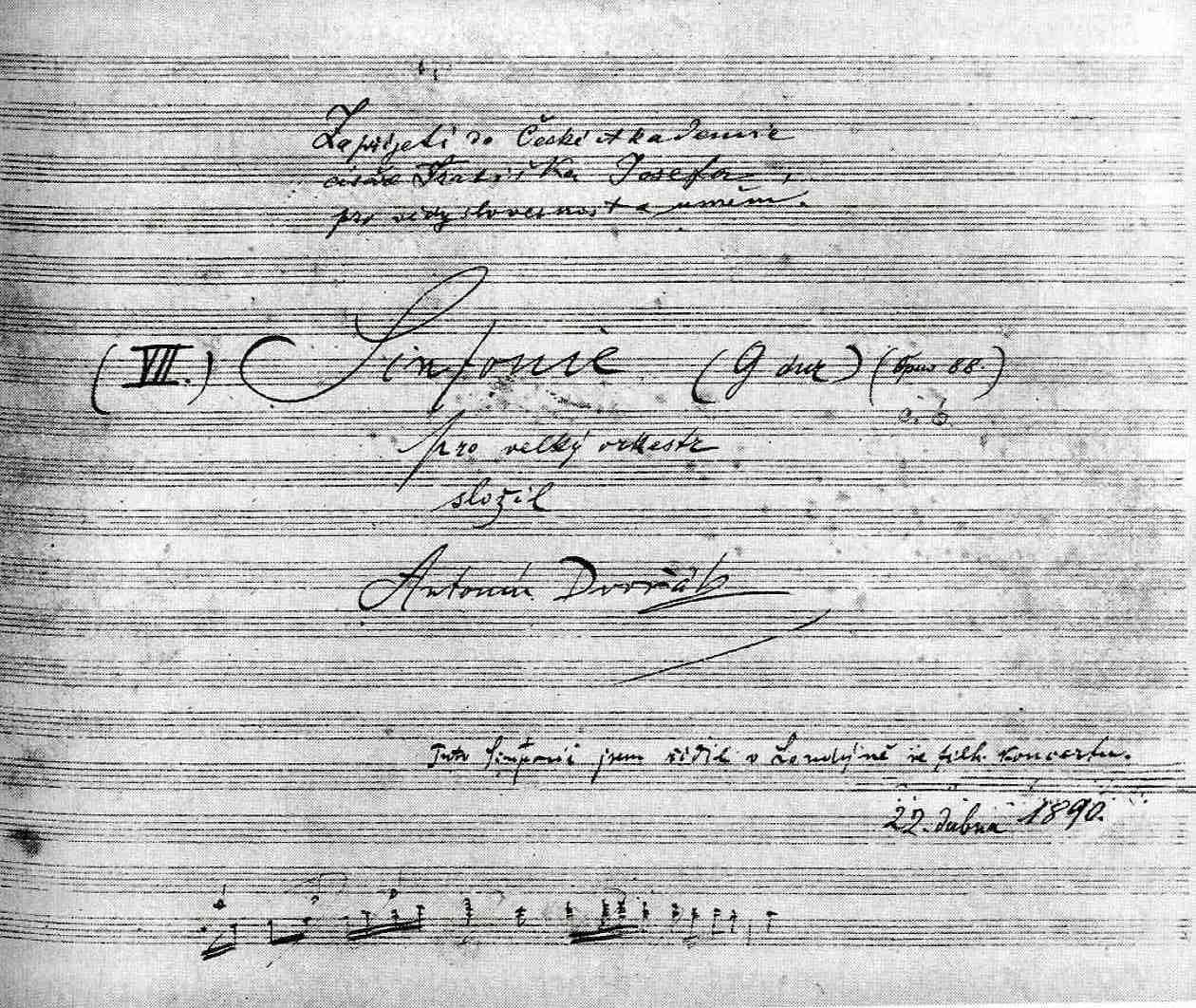
- Title page of the autograph score
- Key: G major
- Catalogue: B. 163
- Opus: 88
- Style: Romantic
- Composed: 26 August – 8 November 1889: Vysoká u Příbramě
- Dedication: Bohemian Academy of Science, Literature and Arts
- Published: 1890
- Duration: c. 36 minutes
- Movements: 4
- Scoring: Orchestra

Premiere
- Date: 2 February 1890
- Location: Prague
- Conductor: Antonín Dvořák
- Performers: Orchestra of the National Theatre

The Symphony No. 8 in G major, Op. 88, B. 163, is a symphony by Antonín Dvořák, composed in 1889 at Vysoká u Příbramě, Bohemia, on the occasion of his election to the Bohemian Academy of Science, Literature and Arts. Dvořák conducted the premiere in Prague on 2 February 1890. In contrast to other symphonies of both the composer and the period, the music is cheerful and optimistic. It was originally published as Symphony No. 4.

== History ==
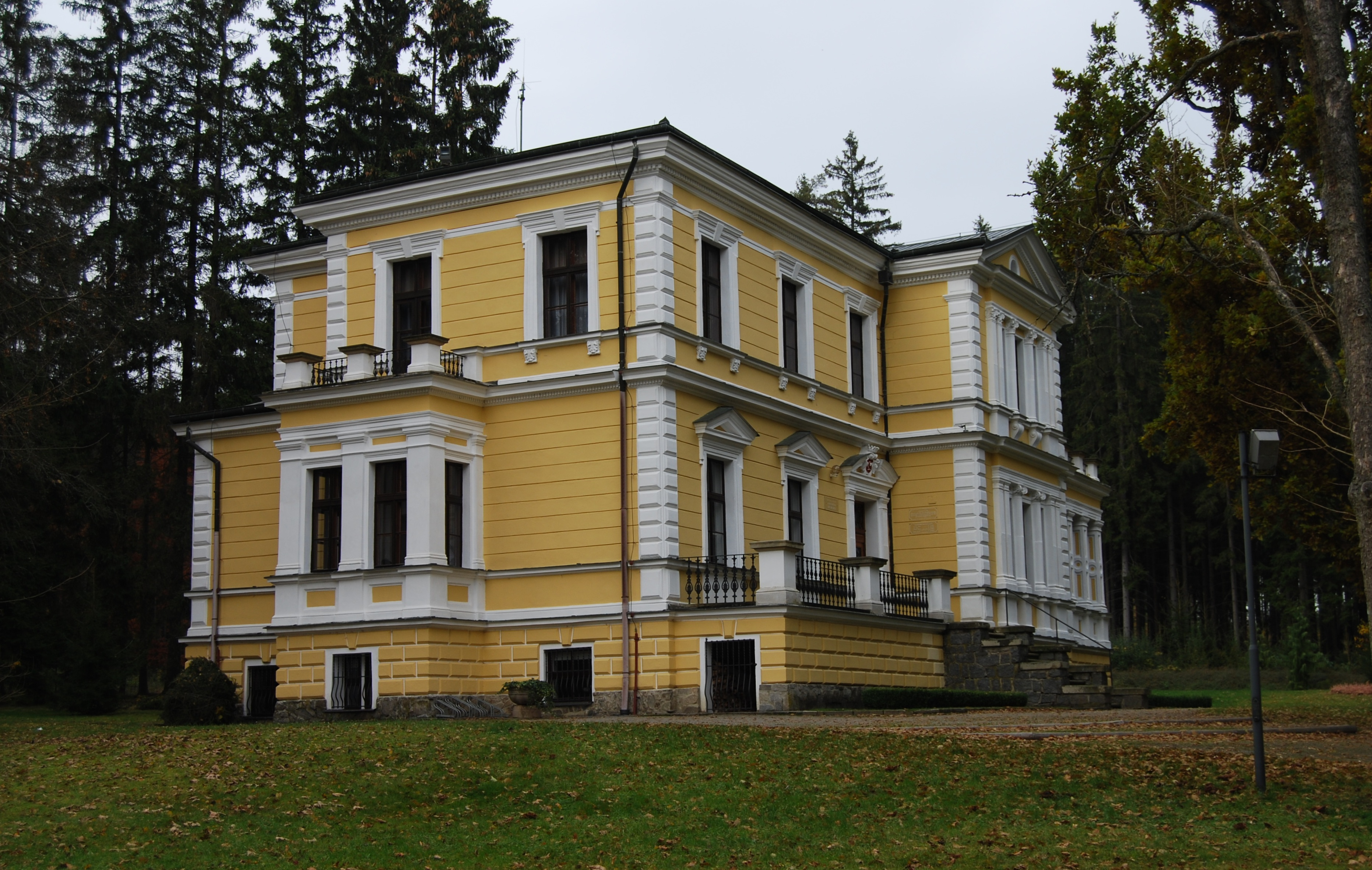
Dvořák's summer residence, where he composed the symphony

Dvořák composed and orchestrated the symphony within the two-and-a-half-month period from 26 August to 8 November 1889 at his summer resort in Vysoká u Příbramě, Bohemia. The score was composed on the occasion of his admission to Prague Academy and dedicated "To the Bohemian Academy of Emperor Franz Joseph for the Encouragement of Arts and Literature, in thanks for my election." Dvořák conducted the premiere in Prague on 2 February 1890.

Dvořák tried to achieve a marked difference to his Symphony No. 7, a stormy romantic work. No. 8 would be: "different from the other symphonies, with individual thoughts worked out in a new way". The Eighth is cheery and lyrical and draws its inspiration more from the Bohemian folk music that Dvořák loved.

== Structure and scoring ==
I. Allegro con brio

II. Adagio

III. Allegretto grazioso

IV. Allegro
DuPage Symphony Orchestra, conducted by Barbara Schubert

Dvořák kept the typical format of a symphony in four movements, but structured them in an unusual way. All movements show a remarkable variety of themes, many of them based on Bohemian material. Occasionally the development of the themes seems like improvisation.

1. Allegro con brio (G minor → G major)
2. Adagio (E♭ major → C minor → C major)
3. Allegretto grazioso – Molto vivace (G minor → trio and coda in G major)
4. Allegro ma non troppo (G major)

The work is scored for two flutes (2nd doubling piccolo), two oboes (1st doubling cor anglais), two clarinets (in A and B♭), two bassoons, four horns, two trumpets, three trombones, tuba, timpani, and strings.

The orchestration of piccolo and cor anglais is unusual in this symphony. The piccolo only sustains a long note in unison with the flute at the exposition of the first movement and the cor anglais only plays a short but exposed phrase during the second recapitulation of the main "bird call" theme, also in the first movement. In some editions, the second oboe doubles on cor anglais rather than the 1st oboe as indicated in most scores.

A typical performance of the symphony lasts about 36 minutes, making it one of Dvořák's shorter symphonies.

=== I. Allegro con brio ===
The first movement is a powerful and glowing exposition characterized by liberal use of timpani. It opens with a lyrical G minor theme in the cellos, horns, clarinets and first bassoon with trombones playing pianissimo accompaniment, and violas and double basses pizzicato. This gives way to a "bird call" flute melody, reaching the symphony's key of G major.

Writing about a performance by the National Symphony Orchestra, Peter Laki notes that the development section "works up quite a storm." In the recapitulation, the second main theme is played by the English horn, two octaves lower than in the exposition. The movement ends with a "short but very energetic coda."

=== II. Adagio ===
Despite being marked Adagio, the second movement moves along at quite a reasonable speed. It begins with the strings playing the main theme of the movement and ending very softly, following with a similar motion in the oboes and flutes; the clarinets answer, and this conversation continues, including a strong interjection by the strings. The dialogue between the woodwinds dies down and leads into theme being stated by the first flute and oboe, over light clarinets, bassoons, and first horn, descending C major scales in the violins, pizzicato violas and cellos, and gentle quavers in the basses. A similar statement of the theme is echoed by a violin solo, which ends in cheerful and satisfying double stops. The orchestra then plays a variant of the theme boldly. Much of the movement is development of this same theme.

Similar to Beethoven's Pastoral Symphony, the music is inspired by the tranquil landscapes, depicting a summer's day, interrupted by a thunderstorm.

=== III. Allegretto grazioso – Molto vivace ===
Most of the third movement is a melancholy waltz in 3/8 time. Near the end, the meter changes to 2/4, and the music ends in a manner not unlike that of the second movement. The first notes of the Trio section (G major) are used in the Coda in 2/4. The movement is not the typical minuet or scherzo, but an "intermezzo" akin to the third movements of the First and Second Symphonies by Brahms. In contrast to the "sweet and languid waltz" of the first theme, the second, "functioning as a 'trio,' sounds more like a Bohemian folk dance".

=== IV. Allegro ma non troppo ===
The finale, formally a "complex theme-and-variations", is the most turbulent movement. It begins with a fanfare of trumpets. Conductor Rafael Kubelik said in a rehearsal: "Gentlemen, in Bohemia the trumpets never call to battle – they always call to the dance!" The music progresses to a beautiful melody which is first played by the cellos. The tension is masterfully built and finally released at approximately two minutes into the piece, with a cascade of instruments triumphantly playing the initial theme at a somewhat faster pace.

A central contrasting episode is derived from the main theme. From there the movement compellingly progresses through a tempestuous middle section, modulating from major to minor several times throughout. After a return to the slow, lyrical section, the piece ends on a chromatic coda, in which brass and timpani are greatly prominent.

Laki summarises: "Dvorák's handling of form is indebted to Beethoven and Brahms, but he filled out the form with melodies of an unmistakably Czech flavor and a joviality few composers at the time possessed. The variations vary widely in character: some are slower and some are faster in tempo, some are soft (such as the virtuosic one for solo flute), and some are noisy; most are in the major mode, though the central one, reminiscent of a village band, is in the minor. The music is always cheerful and optimistic."

== Performances and publication ==
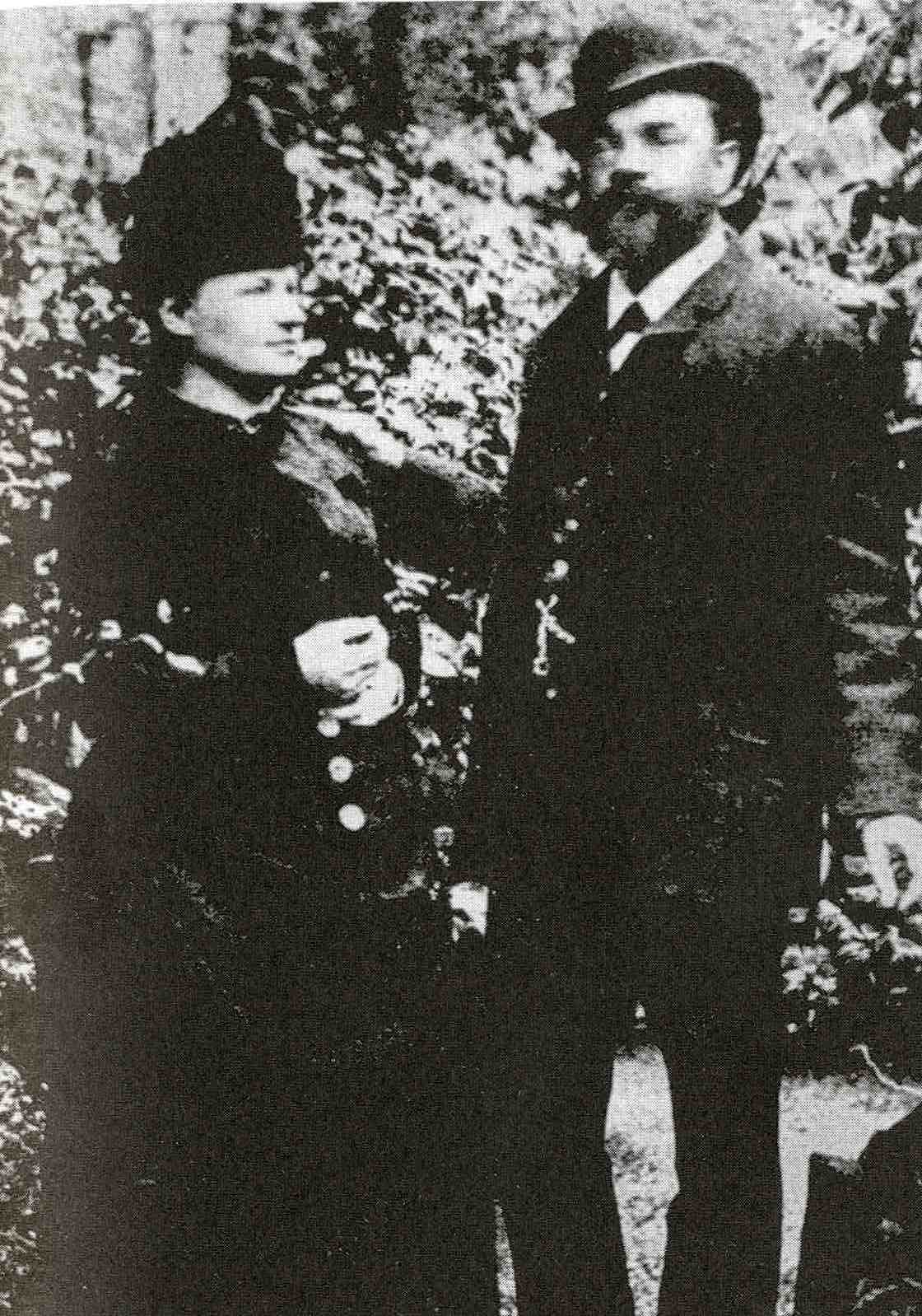
The composer with his wife Anna in London, 1886

The composer conducted the orchestra of the National Theater in Prague in the first performance on 2 February 1890, as part of the concert 13. Populäres Konzert der Künstlerressource (13th popular concert of the artists' resource). After the successful premiere, he conducted the work again on 7 November 1890 in a Museumskonzert in Frankfurt and the following year in Cambridge, on the night before his being awarded an honorary doctorate. The symphony was performed several times by the Royal Philharmonic Society during his sixth trip to the United Kingdom.

Hans Richter conducted the first performances in Vienna and London. He wrote after the concert in Vienna to the composer: "An dieser Aufführung hätten Sie gewiß Freude gehabt. Wir alle haben gefühlt, daß es sich um ein herrliches Werk handelt: darum waren wir alle auch mit Enthusiasmus dabei. […] Der Beifall war warm und herzlich." (You would have enjoyed this performance very much. We all felt that it is a great work, therefore we all were enthusiastic. [...] The applause was warm and cordial.)

Dvořák had the London firm of Vincent Novello publish the symphony in 1890, because he had disagreements with his regular publisher Fritz Simrock, who was more interested in shorter works as moneymakers. Simrock wanted to publish the movement titles and the composer's name in German, which Dvořák refused as a "proud Bohemian". Because of the country of its first publication, this symphony has occasionally been known as the "English" symphony, though "it would be more correct to call it the 'Czech', at least in comparison with its predecessor in D minor which was modelled more on Brahms."

== Performance history ==
List of performances during Dvořák's life.

- Prague, Austria-Hungary: 2 February 1890, conducted by Dvořák himself at Rudolfinum
- London, Great Britain: 24 April 1890, conducted by Dvořák himself at St James's Hall
- Frankfurt, German Empire: 7 November 1890, conducted by Dvořák himself
- Cambridge, Great Britain: 15 May 1891, conducted by Dvořák himself
- Vienna, Austria-Hungary: 4 January 1891, conducted by Hans Richter
- Chicago, United States: 12 August 1893, conducted by Dvořák himself at the World's Columbian Exposition
- London, Great Britain: 19 March 1896, conducted by Dvořák himself

== Sources ==
- Christoph Hahn, Siegmar Hohl (eds.), Bertelsmann Konzertführer. Bertelsmann Lexikon Verlag, Gütersloh/Munich 1993, ISBN 3-570-10519-9
- Annette Retinski, Alfred Beaujean, Harenberg Konzertführer: der Schlüssel zu 600 Werken von 200 Komponisten: mit 800 CD-Empfehlungen der "FonoForum"-Redaktion, fourth edition. Harenberg Kommunikation, Dortmund, 1998. ISBN 3-611-00535-5.
- Hansjürgen Schaefer: Konzertbuch Orchestermusik A-F. VEB Deutscher Verlag für Musik, Leipzig 1958.
