= Karolina Světlá =

Czech writer (1830–1899)

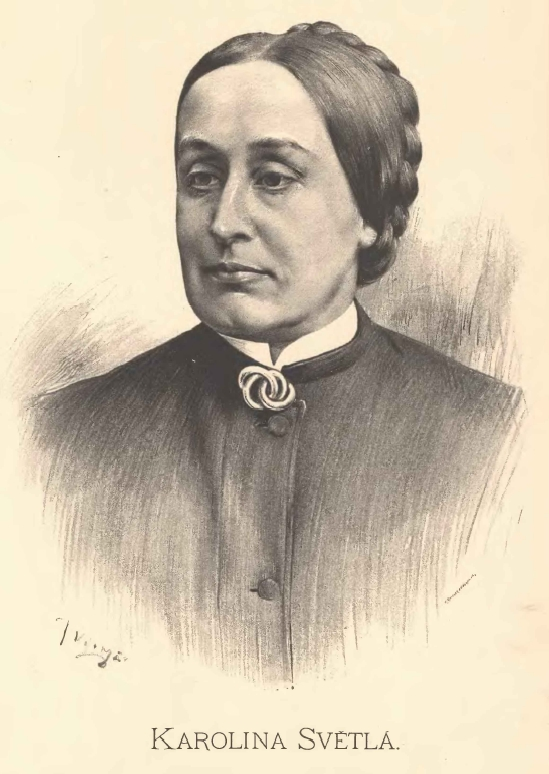
- Portrait of Karolina Světlá by Jan Vilímek
- Born: Johana Nepomucena Rottová; 24 February 1830; Prague, Bohemia, Austrian Empire
- Died: 7 September 1899 (aged 69); Prague, Bohemia, Austria-Hungary
- Resting place: Olšany Cemetery
- Occupation: Writer
- Relatives: Sofie Podlipská (sister)
- Writing career
- Genre: Literary realism
- Notable works: Vesnický román Kříž u potoka
- Movement: Májovci

Signature
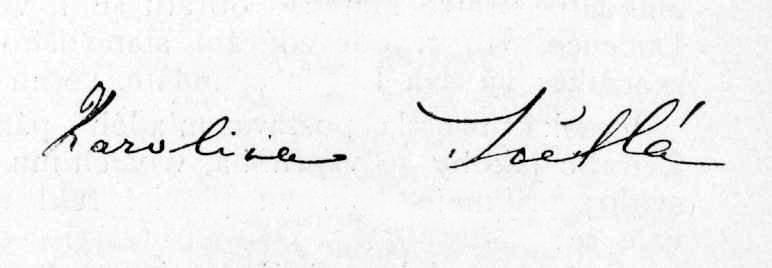

Karolina Světlá (born Johana Nepomucena Rottová; 24 February 1830 – 7 September 1899) was a Czech writer and feminist. She is among the most important Czech female writers of the 19th century.

== Life ==
She was born Johana Nepomucena Rottová on 24 February 1830 in Prague, into the family of a merchant. Although she received an education in French and German, she became a Czech patriot. She became a friend of Božena Němcová, an important Czech female writer and one of the figures of the Czech National Revival. In 1852, she married her teacher of music Petr Mužák (1821–1892). Němcová and Mužák helped her find her way back to the Czech language. She had a daughter, who died in 1853, and that was the impetus for moving from Prague to Světlá (today Světlá pod Ještědem), where her husband was born.

She lived in Světlá from 1853 to 1865. In 1858, Johana Mužáková used the pseudonym Karolina Světlá for the first time. She chose this pseudonym after the village of Světlá and after her niece Karolina (born in 1853), who also lived in Světlá. In the 1860s, Karolina Světlá had a short affair with her friend Jan Neruda.

In 1875, Světlá contracted an eye disease that gradually worsened and left her almost blind. She dictated her works to her niece and her maid. She spent her last decade alone in her apartment in the U kamenného stolu historical house at Charles Square in Prague. Karolina Světlá died on 7 September 1899 in Prague. She is buried at Olšany Cemetery.

== Work ==
Světlá was associated with the literary Májovci group. She introduced Eliška Krásnohorská to literature and feminism. She edited the magazine Ženské listy, which was established by Krásnohorská in 1873.

Her first novel Vesnický román ("A Village Novel") was published in 1867. Her work Kříž u potoka (1868) was adapted into a film of the same name in 1921. Both Vesnický román and Kříž u potoka are valued for the elaborate psychology of the characters and the escalation of the dramatic plot. Her other works include the novels Nemodlenec (1873) and Kantůrčice (1876), which are characterised by the struggle of female heroines against their restrictive environment.

== Family ==
Světlá's sister, Sofie Podlipská, also became a writer.

== Legacy ==
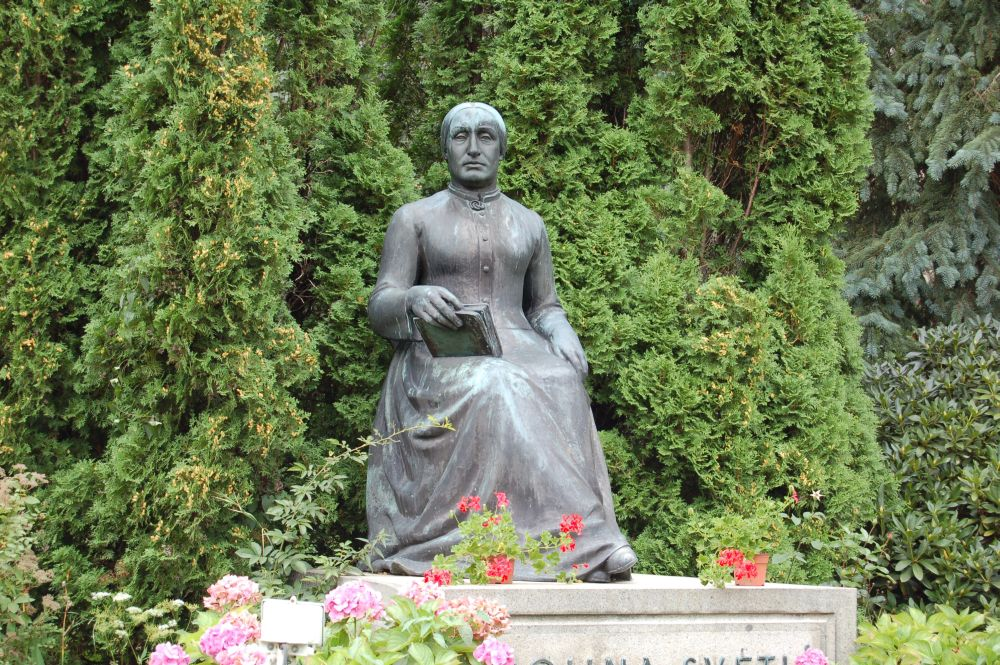
Monument of Karolina Světlá in Světlá pod Ještědem

In the central part of the park on Charles Square in Prague is a memorial with a bust of Karolina Světlá. The work was created in 1910 by Gustav Zoula according to a design by Josef Fanta. It is protected as a cultural monument.

In 1931, the monument of Karolina Světlá was raised in Světlá pod Ještědem, also protected as a cultural monument.

In 1980, Josef Špičák wrote a book called Karolina Světlá, dealing with Světlá's life, work and legacy.

Dozens of cities and towns in the Czech Republic have a street named after Karolina Světlá, including Prague (Old Town), Brno, Ostrava, Plzeň, Liberec, Olomouc, České Budějovice and Hradec Králové.

Life and personal things of Karolina Světlá are presented in a museum in Český Dub, a town near Světlá pod Ještědem.

A literary festival bearing Karolina Světlá's name is held annually in Světlá pod Ještědem. It is stylised in the spirit of the 19th century.
