= Ženské listy =

Women's magazine in Prague (1873–1926)

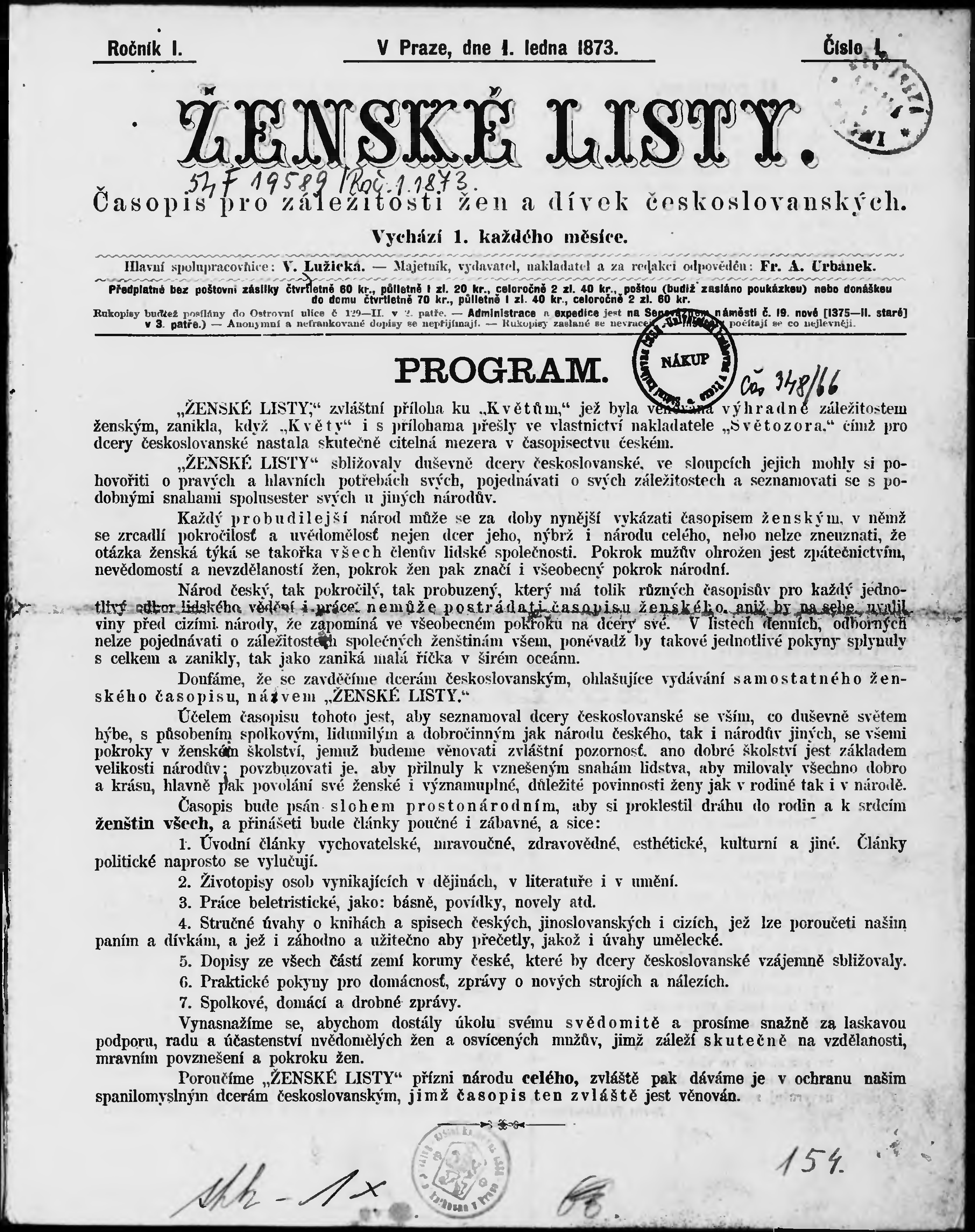
- Cover page dated January 1873
- Categories: Women's magazine
- Frequency: Monthly
- Founder: Eliška Krásnohorská
- Founded: 1873
- Final issue: 1926
- Based in: Prague
- Language: Czech

Ženské listy (Czech: Women's Pages) is one of the early women's magazines published in Prague between 1873 and 1926. It provided a synthesis of feminism and nationalism.

== History and profile ==
Ženské listy was established by Eliška Krásnohorská in 1873 and was an organ of the Women's Manufacturing Society. The magazine was published by the Society on a monthly basis.

Eliška Krásnohorská was in charge of the magazine until 1912. Karolina Světlá was among the editors of Ženské listy. Jindřiška Flajšhansová replaced Eliška Krásnohorská as editor-in-chief of the magazine.

The magazine acted as a platform for Czech women to express their views. It supported women's emancipation, but it approached this issue from a nationalistic perspective. Throughout its existence Ženské listy did not become close to any political party. The magazine folded in 1926 due to poor financial conditions.
