= Za trochu lásky... =

Book by František Kožík

Za trochu lásky... is a Czech novel, written by František Kožík and published in 1997. The story revolves around the life and relationships of 19th-century poet and playwright, Jaroslav Vrchlický.

The book's title (For a little love...) is taken from one of Vrchlický's poems.
