= Jindřiška Flajšhansová =

Czech teacher, editor and women's rights activist

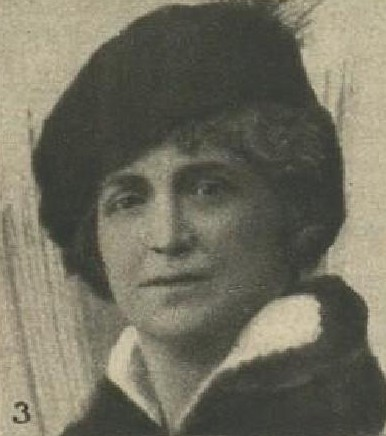
- Flajšhansová, prior to 1931
- Born: Jindřiška Kakšová; 4 September 1868; Sedlčany, Bohemia
- Died: 30 May 1931 (aged 62); Prague, Czechoslovakia
- Other names: Jindra B. Flajšhansová, Jindřiška Kakšová
- Occupations: Teacher, writer, activist
- Years active: 1889–1931

Jindřiška Flajšhansová (4 September 1868 – 30 May 1931) was a Czech teacher, editor, and women's rights activist. Trained as a teacher, when she married, Flajšhansová was forced to give up the profession. She turned her attention to the issues of disability and women's concerns. Becoming an advocate for people with sight difficulties, she supported the use of braille and edited the Czech Blind Press. From 1910, she served as the head of the Czech Women's Industrial Association until 1931 and the primary editor of Ženské listy from 1912 until it folded in 1926. She was instrumental in the erection of a monument in Charles Square to honour Eliška Krásnohorská, who founded the first girls' gymnasium in the Austro-Hungarian Empire.

== Early life and education ==
Jindřiška Kakšová was born on 4 September 1868, in Sedlčany, in the Kingdom of Bohemia, to Marie (née Sršňová) and Ludvík Pravoslav Kakš. Her mother was a personal friend of Jan Neruda and after her marriage, he became a life-long family friend, as well as her correspondent. Her father was a lawyer, and practised in Slaný. He also dabbled in theatre and wrote librettos. Her brother, Jan, was also musical but studied law. Kakšová had few options to further her education at the time and decided to study teaching. She graduated from the Czech Institute for the Education of Female Teachers in Prague around 1889.

== Career ==
Upon her graduation, Kakšová taught for five years before marrying Václav Flajšhans in 1894. Because of legislation which existed at the time, married women were not allowed to continue teaching. After the birth of her two children, Jindřiška and Jan, Flajšhansová began working as a journalist and editor for various associations and charitable organisations. She was concerned about teaching for blind and partially-sighted people and became an advocate for the use of braille in education. Joining the Czech Association of the Blind, she became a vice-president of the organisation and worked as the editor of the Czech Blind Press. The organisation's office was in the same building as the Czech Women's Industrial Association (Czech: Ženského výrobního spolku českého), bringing Flajšhansová into contact with Eliška Krásnohorská, who founded the first girls' gymnasium in the Austro-Hungarian Empire. Krásnohorská, who also founded the association and its journal, Ženské listy, recruited Flajšhansová to join the Czech Women's Industrial Association.

In 1910, when declining health forced Krásnohorská to retire, Flajšhansová became the chair of the Czech Women's Industrial Association. Within two years, she also became the editor of Ženské listy. Besides publishing original articles in the journal, Flajšhansová translated works from other authors working in the women's movement internationally. The focus of the magazine was to publish literary works from women authors and provide practical educational advice on running a household, medicine and hygiene, training and employment. As World War I was approaching, the magazine increasingly focused on politics. Flajšhansová, as a pacifist, advocated for peaceful solutions. As the war continued, the magazine did not face censorship like other feminist publications, as it espoused largely conservative views. It increasingly became a survival manual on how to get through the war.

Despite the financial struggles that continued to plague the organisation and the magazine, Flajšhansová refused to allow it to become affiliated with any specific political party. In 1921, she tried to resign from the editorship and pass the job over to Maryša Šárecká and Pavla Moudrá, but the change was unsuccessful. From 1923, she was able to have František Sekanina take on most of the editorial duties. She finally stepped away from editing the journal in 1926, when it ceased publication, because of a lack of funding. That year, Krásnohorská died and Flajšhansová began pressing for a monument to be installed in Charles Square in her honour.

== Death and legacy ==
Flajšhansová died suddenly on 30 May 1931, the day before the monument to Krásnohorská was to be unveiled. Both women were honoured during the dedication ceremony, which took place on 31 May. She was remembered for her dedication to issues which impacted women and girls and her work to preserve the memory of Krásnohorská.
