= Nemodlenec =

Novel by Karolina Světlá

Nemodlenec (Czech for "not praying man") is a Czech novel, written by Karolina Světlá. It was first published in 1873.
