= Světlá pod Ještědem =

- Municipality
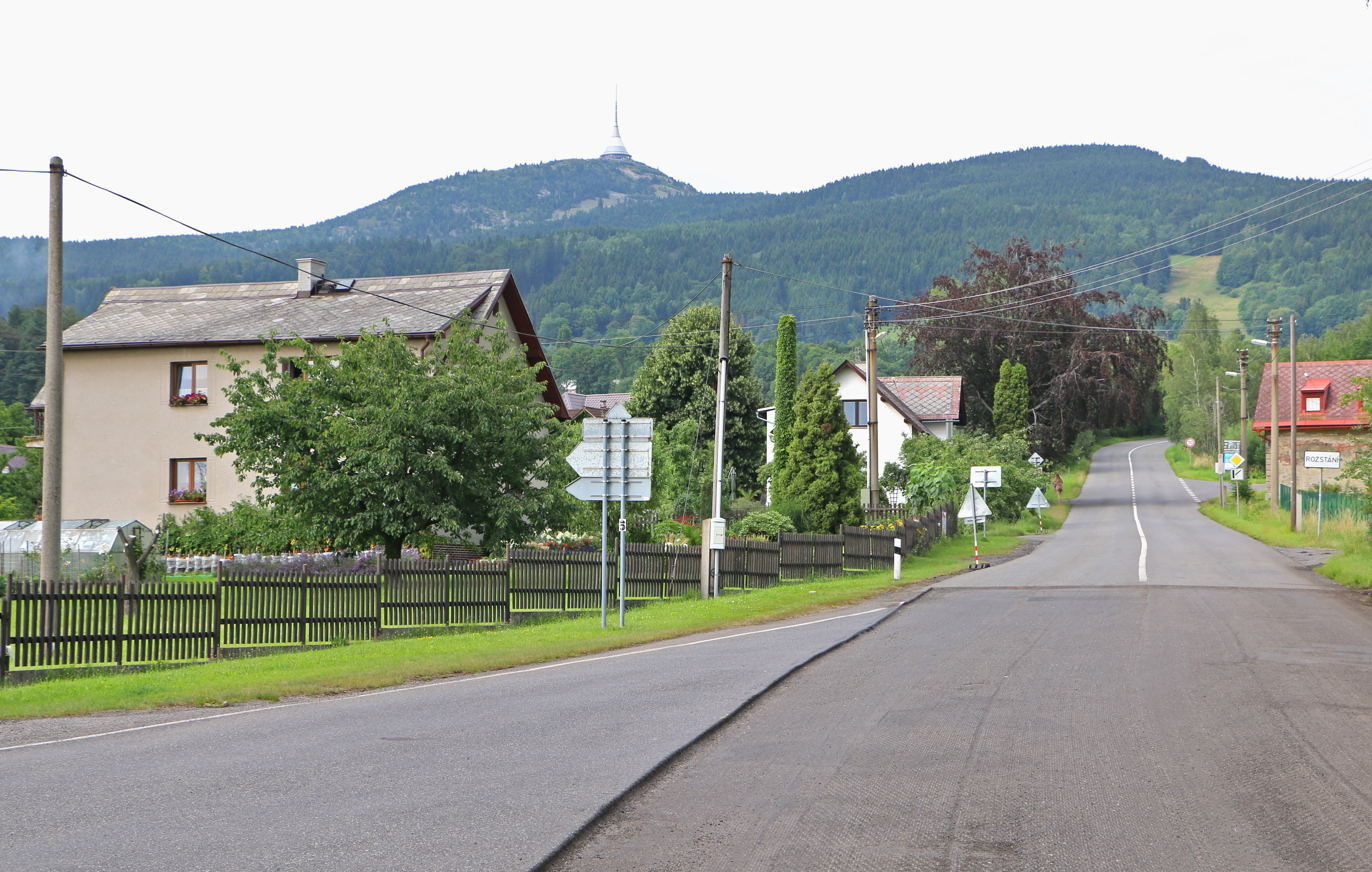
- Main road in the municipality

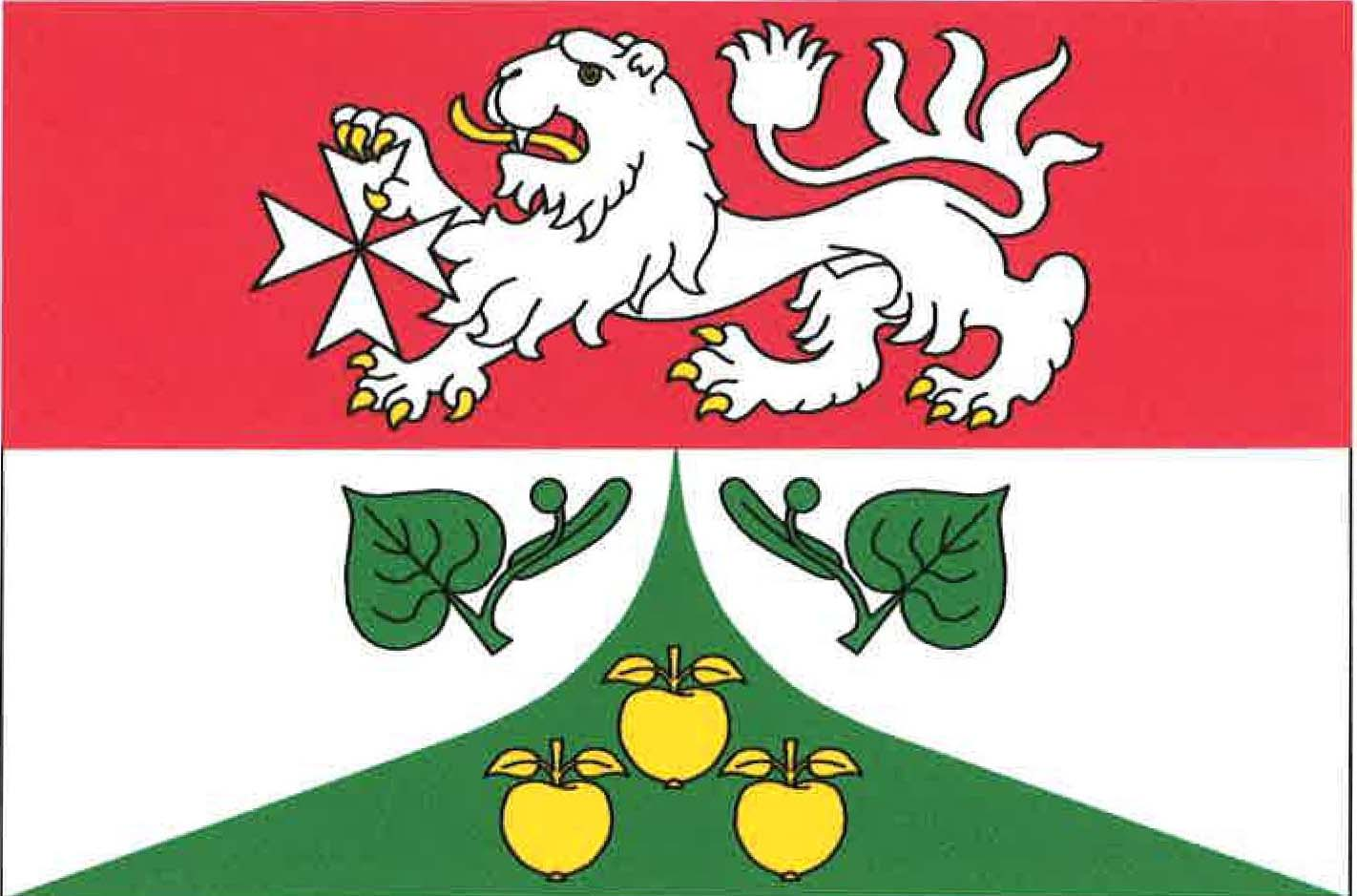
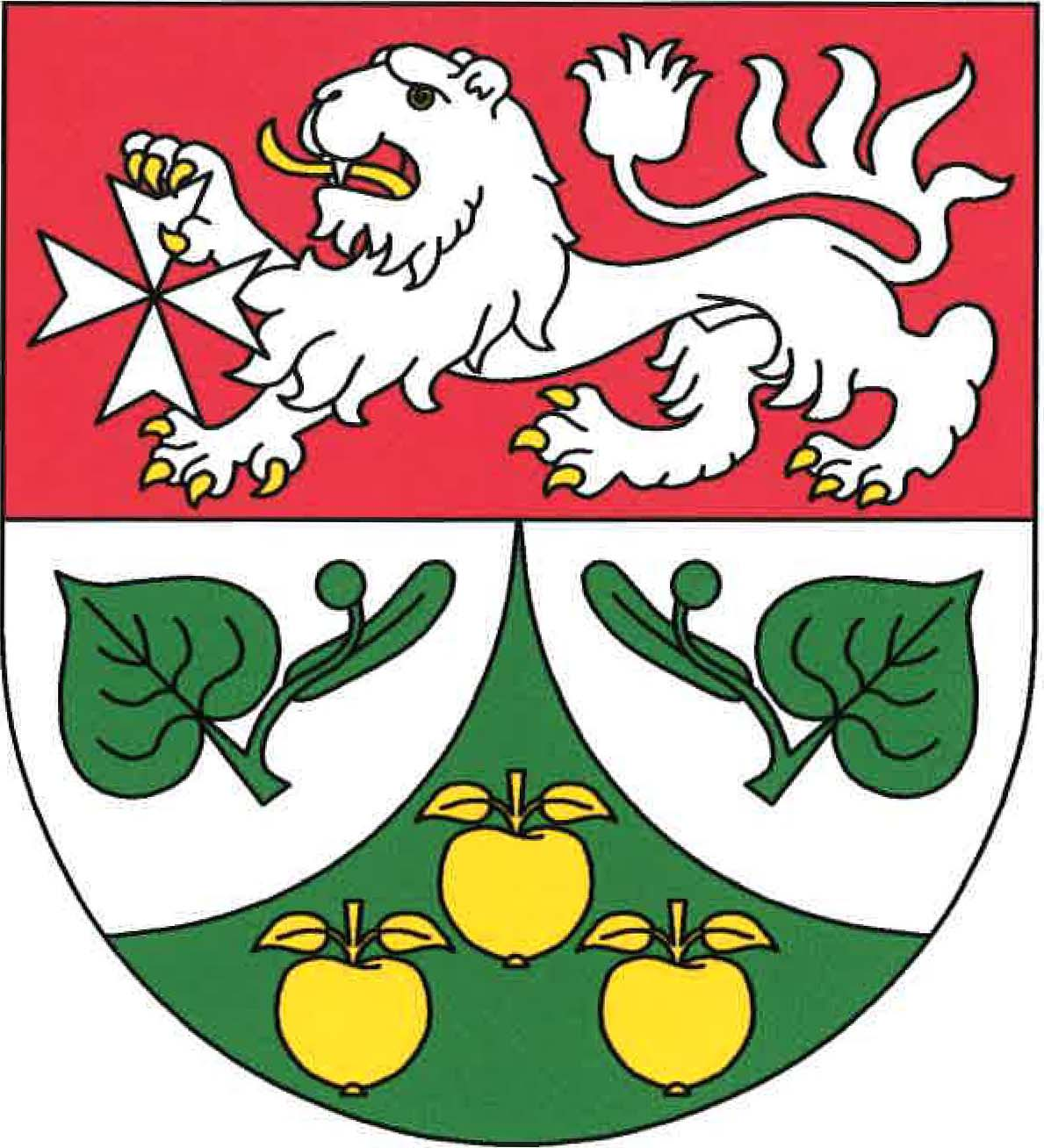
- Flag Coat of arms

- Location in the Czech Republic
- Coordinates: 50°42′41″N 14°59′10″E
- Country: Czech Republic
- Region: Liberec
- District: Liberec
- First mentioned: 1291

Area
  - Total: 13.20 km^{2} (5.10 sq mi)
- Elevation: 545 m (1,788 ft)

Population (2026-01-01)
  - Total: 972
  - Density: 73.6/km^{2} (191/sq mi)
- Time zone: UTC+1 (CET)
  - Summer (DST): UTC+2 (CEST)
- Postal code: 463 43
- Website: www.svetlapodjestedem.cz

Světlá pod Ještědem is a municipality and village in Liberec District in the Liberec Region of the Czech Republic. It has about 1,000 inhabitants.

== Administrative division ==
Světlá pod Ještědem consists of eight municipal parts (in brackets population according to the 2021 census):

- Světlá pod Ještědem (82)
- Dolení Paseky (150)
- Hodky (148)
- Hoření Paseky (77)
- Jiříčkov (101)
- Křižany (3)
- Rozstání (371)
- Vesec (19)

== Etymology ==
The name Světlá is derived from the Czech adjective světlá, meaning 'light', 'bright'. The suffix pod Ještědem means 'below Ještěd'.

== Geography ==
Světlá pod Ještědem is located about 6 kilometres (4 mi) southwest of Liberec. In lies on the border between the Ještěd–Kozákov Ridge and Ralsko Uplands. The highest point is near the top of the Ještěd mountain at 1,008 m (3,307 ft) above sea level. There are springs of several streams on the slopes of the Ještěd within the municipality, including the secondary spring of the Ploučnice River.

== History ==
The first written mention of Světlá pod Ještědem is from 1291.

== Demographics ==
Historical population

Year	Pop.	±%
1869	1,760	—
1880	1,810	+2.8%
1890	1,828	+1.0%
1900	1,931	+5.6%
1910	1,867	−3.3%

Year	Pop.	±%
1921	1,707	−8.6%
1930	1,791	+4.9%
1950	1,094	−38.9%
1961	1,064	−2.7%
1970	948	−10.9%

Year	Pop.	±%
1980	778	−17.9%
1991	724	−6.9%
2001	790	+9.1%
2011	901	+14.1%
2021	951	+5.5%

Source: Censuses

== Transport ==
There are no railways or major roads passing through the municipality.

== Sights ==
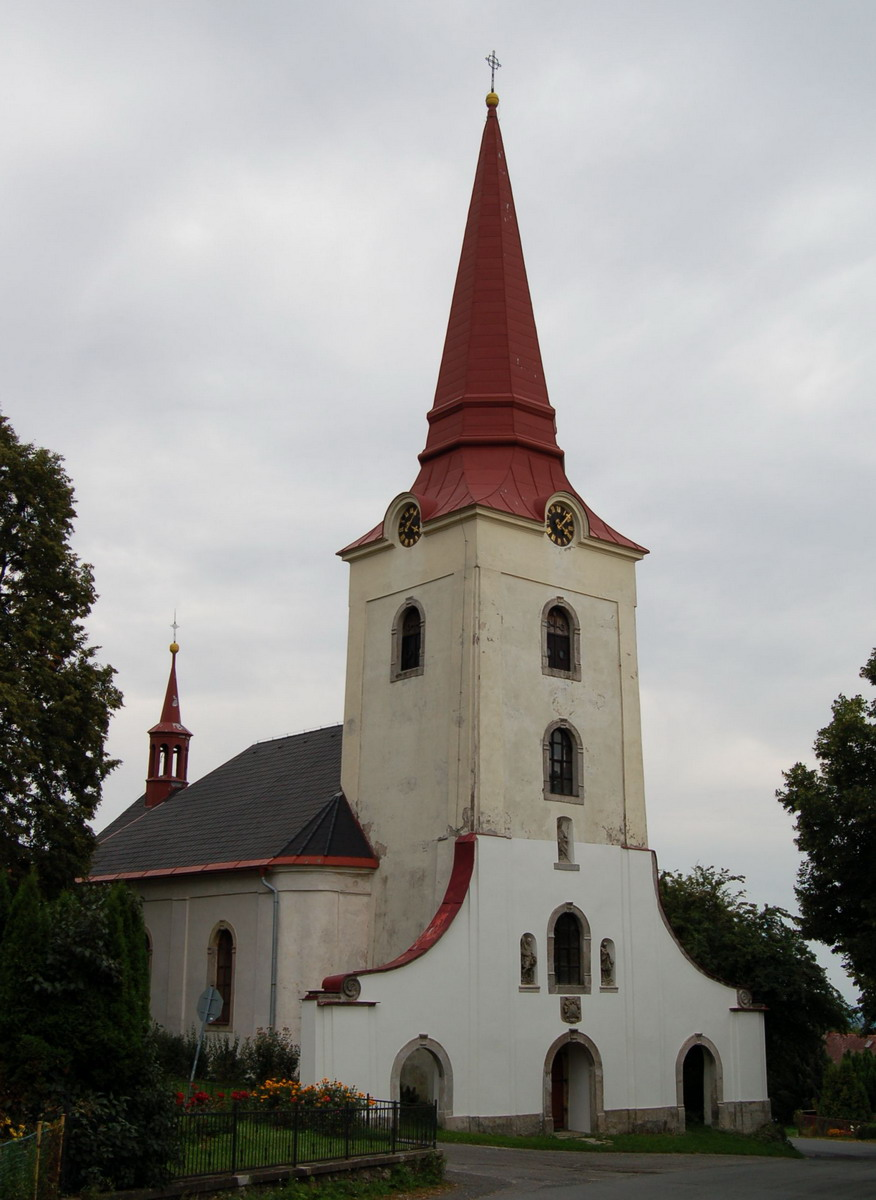
Church of Saint Nicholas

The main landmark of Světlá pod Ještědem is the Church of Saint Nicholas. The Baroque church was built in 1643 and reconstructed in 1678 and 1717. In 1725–1730, the church was partly rebuilt and extended, and the tower was raised.

A notable sculptural work is the monument of the writer Karolina Světlá, raised in 1931. She lived here from 1853 to 1865 and chose her pseudonym according to the name of the village.

== Notable people ==
- Karolina Světlá (1830–1899), writer; lived here in 1853–1865
