= Eliška Krásnohorská =

Czech feminist author (1847 –1926)

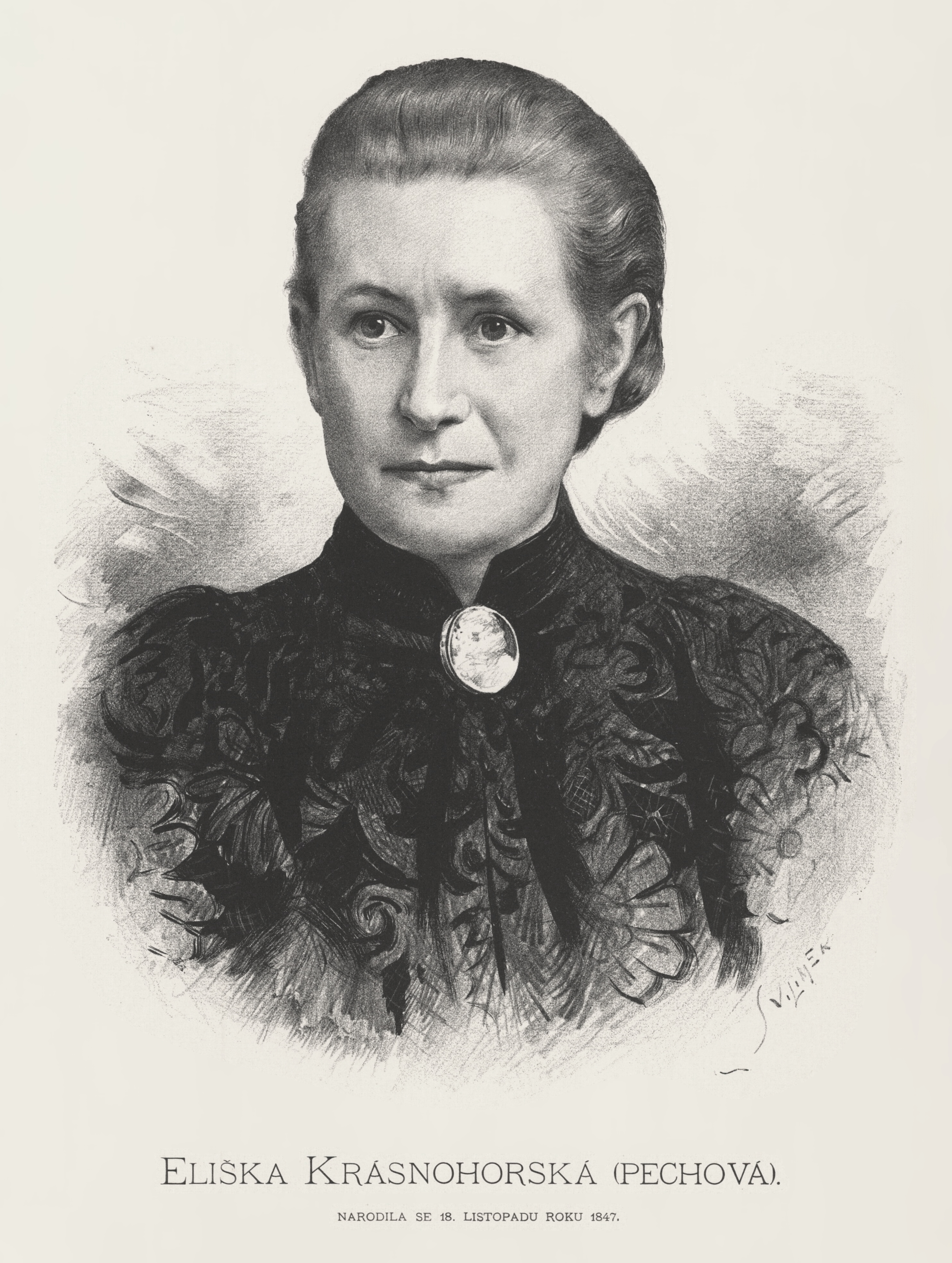
- Portrait of Eliška Krásnohorská by Jan Vilímek
- Born: Alžběta Pechová; 18 November 1847; Prague, Austrian Empire
- Died: 26 November 1926 (aged 79); Prague, Czechoslovakia
- Resting place: Olšany Cemetery
- Occupation: Writer

Eliška Krásnohorská (18 November 1847, in Prague – 26 November 1926, in Prague) was a Czech feminist author. She was introduced to literature and feminism by Karolína Světlá. She wrote works of lyric poetry and literary criticism, however, she is usually associated with children's literature and translations, including works by Pushkin, Mickiewicz and Byron.

Krásnohorská wrote the libretti for four operas by Bedřich Smetana: The Kiss, The Secret, The Devil's Wall and Viola. She also wrote the libretto for Zdeněk Fibich's opera Blaník. In 1873, she founded the women's magazine Ženské listy, which she headed until handing it over to Jindřiška Flajšhansová in 1912.

In 1890 Krásnohorská founded the Minerva School in Prague, the first gymnasium for girls in the Austro-Hungarian Empire. Its language of instruction was Czech.
