= Josef Václav Sládek =

Czech poet

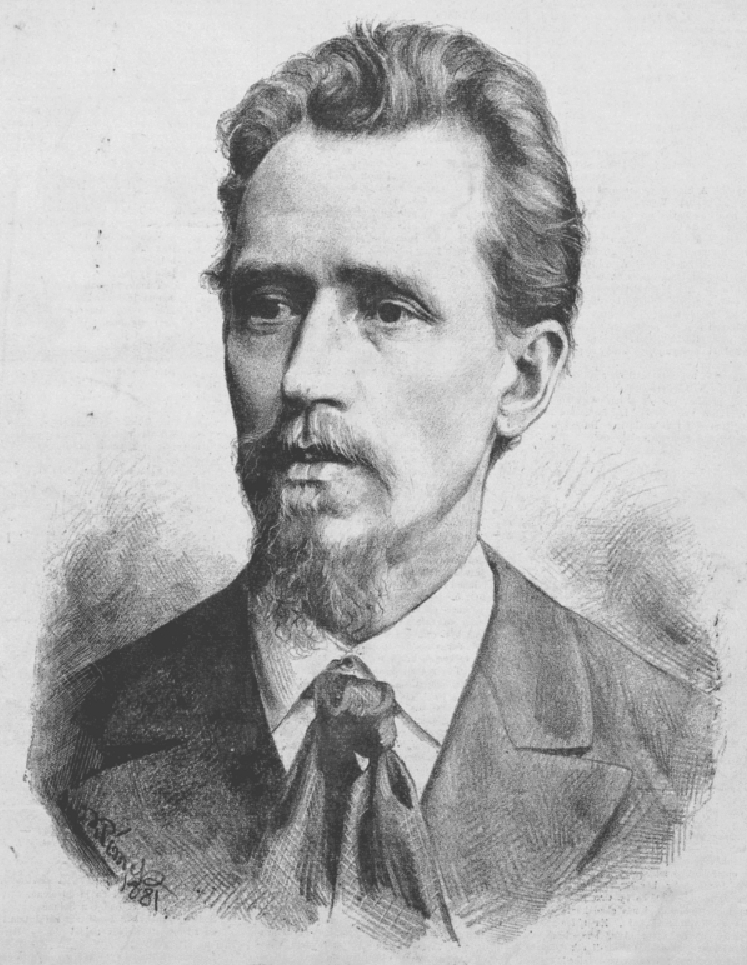
Painting of Sládek by Jan Vilímek

Josef Václav Sládek (27 October 1845 – 28 June 1912) was a Czech poet, journalist and translator. He was a member of the literary group Lumírovci, and a pioneer of children's poetry in Czech lands.

== Life ==
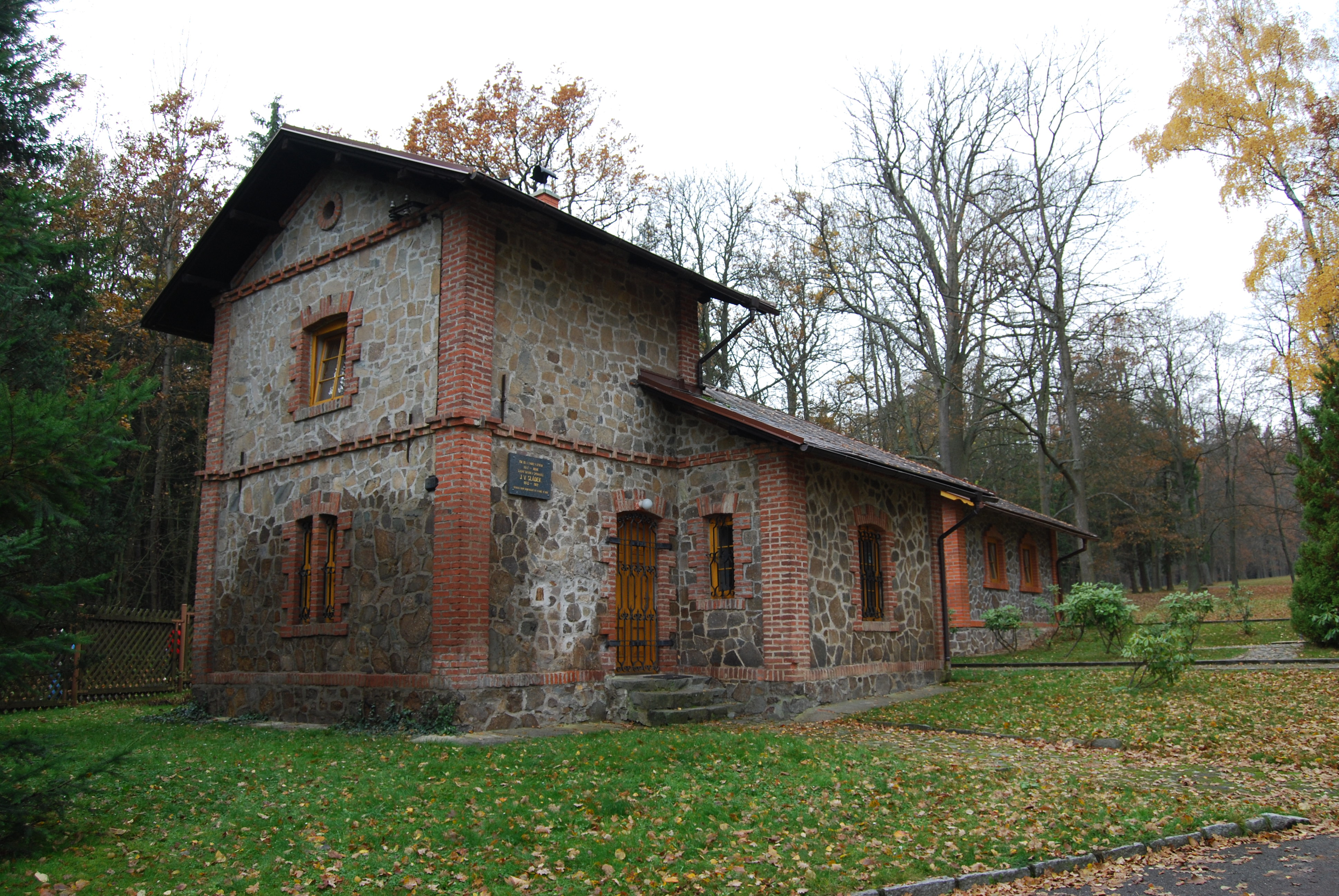
House in Vysoká u Příbramě where Sládek lived from 1897 to 1898

Josef Václav Sládek was born on 27 October 1845 in Zbiroh. In 1865, he graduated from the Academic Gymnasium in Prague. In 1867, he came to be suspected by the Austro-Hungarian police of supporting the Czech opposition movement against the monarchy. In 1868 he moved to United States, where he spent two years working as a laborer. He was interested in the fate of indigenous peoples and black people. He described his American experience in a collection of poems (titled Poems) and in one prose work (American images). His stay in the United States influenced him significantly. Throughout the rest of his life he focused on translating Anglo-American literature. He translated 33 plays by William Shakespeare and other works by Burns, Longfellow, Harte, Byron, Coleridge etc. A less well-known fact is that Sládek translated the Czech anthem Kde domov můj into English.

Sládek was a good friend of Antonín Dvořák and from 1897 to 1898 lived in Vysoká u Příbramě close to Dvořák. His poems were set to music by Karel Bendl and Josef Bohuslav Foerster.

Sládek died on 28 June 1912 in Zbiroh. He is buried in the Slavín tomb at Prague's Vyšehrad Cemetery.

== Works ==
=== Poetry ===
- Básně (1875)
- Jiskry na moři (1880)
- Světlou stopou (1881)
- Na prahu ráje (1883)
- Ze života (1884)
- Sluncem a stínem (1887)
- Selské písně (1890)
- České znělky
- Starosvětské písničky (1891)
- Směska (1891)
- České písně (1892)
- V zimním slunci (1897)
- Nové selské písně
- Za soumraku (1907)
- Léthé a jiné básně (1908)
