= Sofie Podlipská =

Czech writer (1833 –1897)

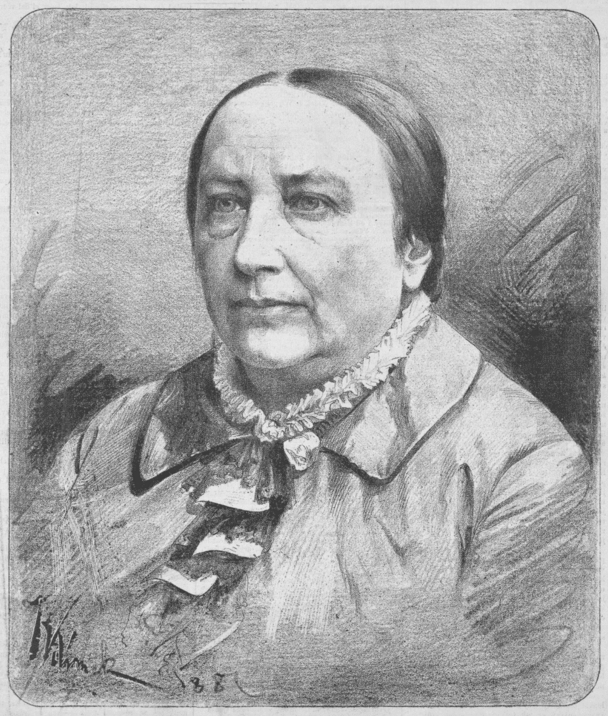
Sofie Podlipská

Sofie Podlipská, née Rottová (15 May 1833 in Prague – 17 December 1897 in Prague) was a Czech writer and the sister of Karolina Světlá. Sofie Podlipská mostly wrote historical novels, juvenile works, and feminist literature. She also had an interest in Theosophy and helped found the "American Ladies' Club." The name had no geographical meaning instead the word "American" was to designate it, as modern and for progress. Her work emphasized motherhood and morality.
