= Vysoká u Příbramě =

- Municipality
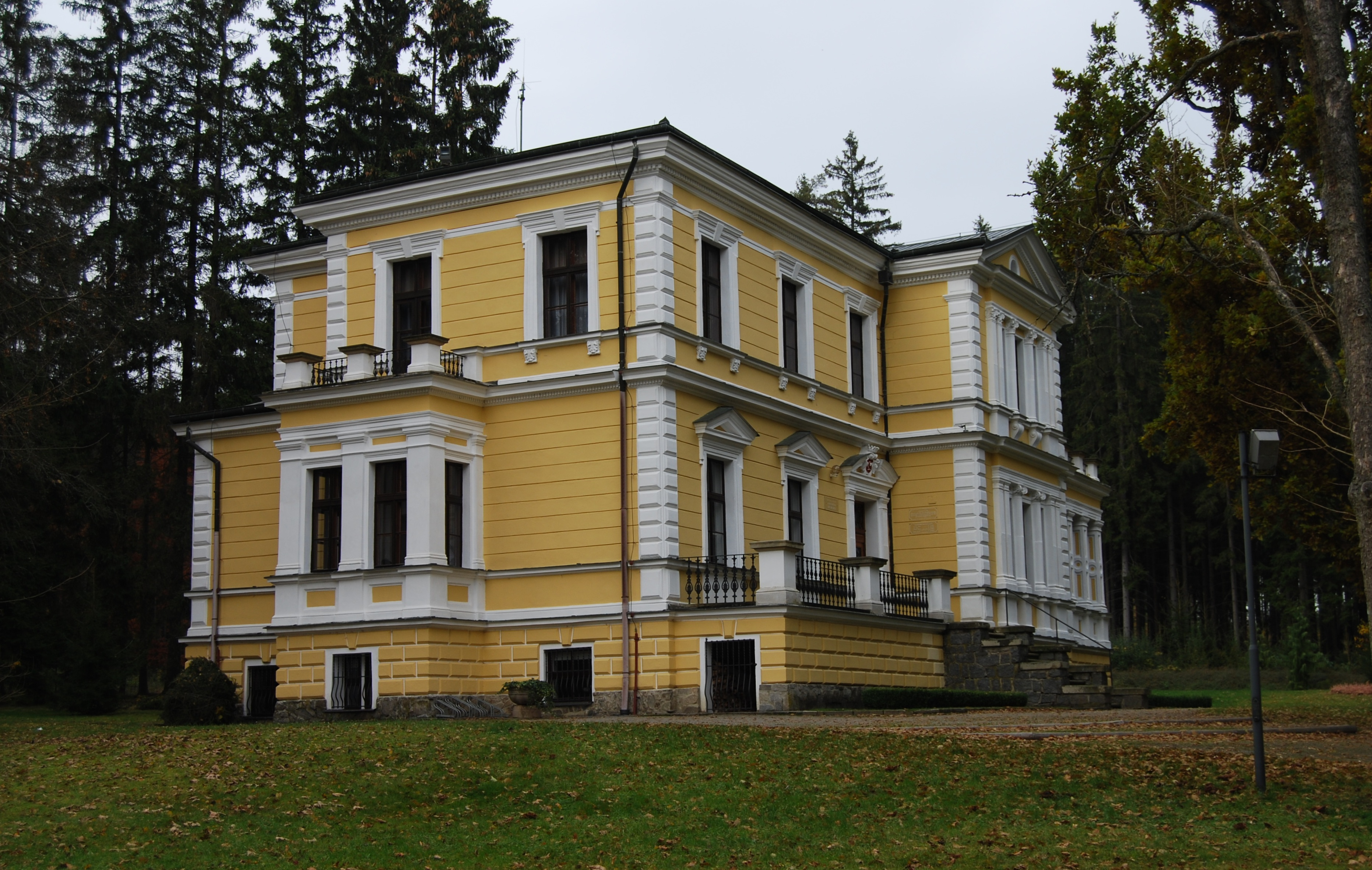
- Vysoká u Příbramě Castle

- Flag Coat of arms

- Location in the Czech Republic
- Coordinates: 49°38′3″N 13°56′54″E
- Country: Czech Republic
- Region: Central Bohemian
- District: Příbram
- First mentioned: 1367

Area
  - Total: 4.87 km^{2} (1.88 sq mi)
- Elevation: 575 m (1,886 ft)

Population (2026-01-01)
  - Total: 365
  - Density: 74.9/km^{2} (194/sq mi)
- Time zone: UTC+1 (CET)
  - Summer (DST): UTC+2 (CEST)
- Postal code: 262 42
- Website: www.vysokaupribrame.cz

Vysoká u Příbramě is a municipality and village in Příbram District in the Central Bohemian Region of the Czech Republic. It has about 400 inhabitants.

== Etymology ==
Vysoká is a common Czech toponym, meaning 'high'. It was usually the name of a hill or forest (referring to its higher altitude), which was then transferred to the village, but sometimes the village itself was named that way. The suffix u Příbramě means 'near Příbram'.

== Geography ==
Vysoká u Příbramě is located about 5 kilometres (3 mi) southwest of Příbram and 55 km (34 mi) southwest of Prague. It lies in the Brdy Highlands. The highest point is the hill na Skále at 633 m (2,077 ft). The Litavka River flows through the municipality. There are several small fishponds in the municipal territory.

== History ==
The first written mention of Vysoká u Příbramě is from 1367.

== Demographics ==
Historical population

Year	Pop.	±%
1869	562	—
1880	615	+9.4%
1890	635	+3.3%
1900	635	+0.0%
1910	573	−9.8%

Year	Pop.	±%
1921	477	−16.8%
1930	413	−13.4%
1950	282	−31.7%
1961	298	+5.7%
1970	277	−7.0%

Year	Pop.	±%
1980	239	−13.7%
1991	259	+8.4%
2001	254	−1.9%
2011	341	+34.3%
2021	346	+1.5%

Source: Censuses

== Transport ==
There are no railways or major roads passing through the municipality.

== Sights ==
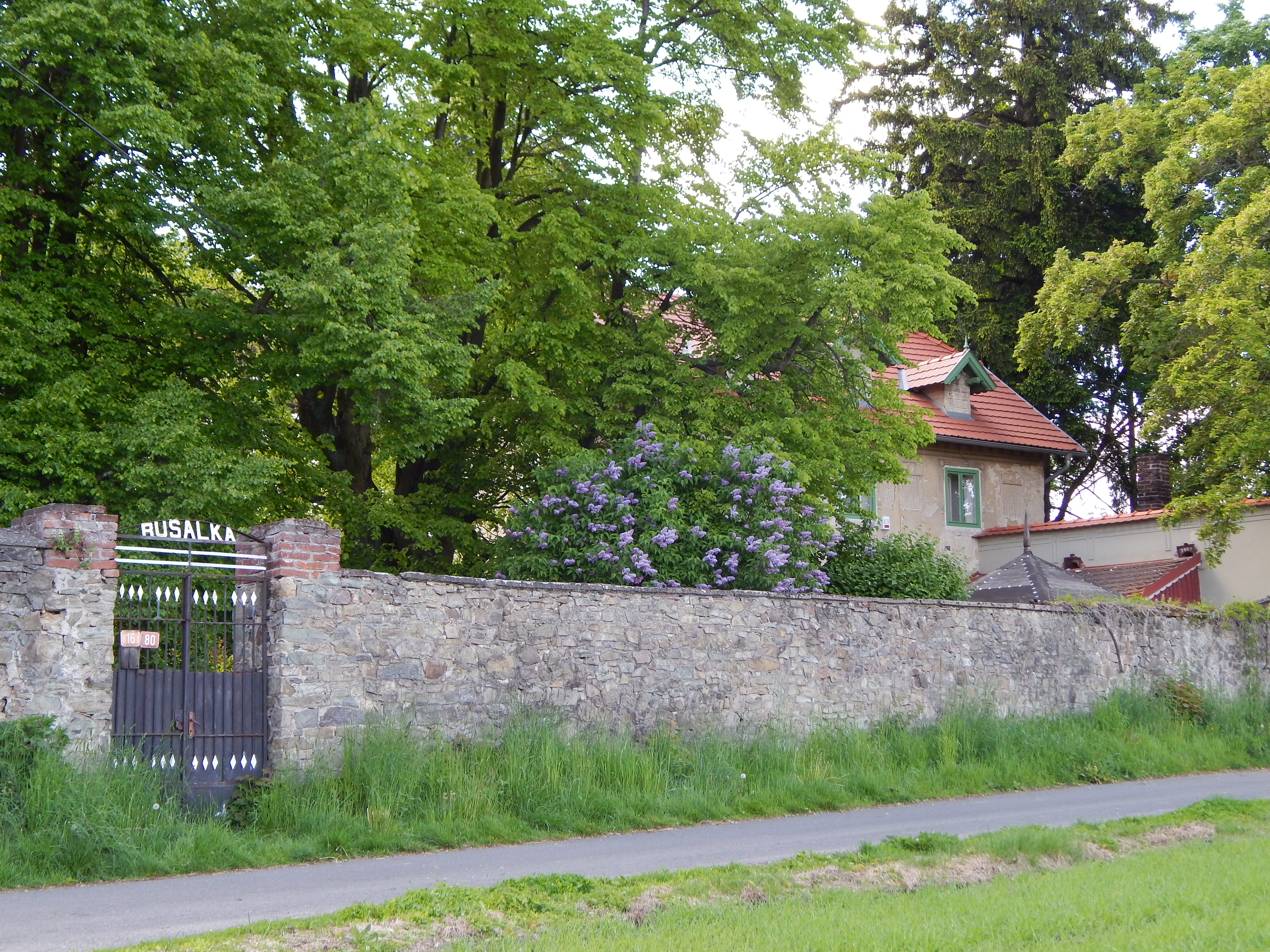
Vila Rusalka

The main landmark of Vysoká u Příbramě is the Vysoká u Příbramě Castle. It was built in the Neo-Renaissance style in 1877. The castle is best known as a place where the composer Antonín Dvořák visited his brother-in-law Václav Kounic during summers. The castle is surrounded by a large landscape park that includes the fishpond Rusalčino jezírko, which inspired Dvořák to write his most famous opera, Rusalka. Today the castle houses the Memorial to Antonín Dvořák, which is a museum dedicated to Dvořák's life and work.

Dvořák's summer residence was a villa, which is today known as Vila Rusalka. Dvořák lived and worked here in summers in the last twenty years of his life. The villa was built by rebuilding an old granary in 1884. In 1908, it was modified in the Art Nouveau style. It is also a protected cultural monument.

== Notable people ==
- Antonín Dvořák (1841–1904), composer; lived and worked here in summers in 1884–1904
