= Neruda (surname) =

Neruda (Czech pronunciation: [ˈnɛruda]; feminine: Nerudová) is a Czech surname. Notable people with the name include:

- Alois Neruda (1837–1899), Czech cellist
- Danuše Nerudová (born 1979), Czech economist
- Franz Xaver Neruda (1843–1915), Czech-Danish cellist, son of Josef Neruda
- Freedom Neruda (born 1956), Ivorian journalist
- Jan Neruda (1834–1891), Czech journalist, writer and poet
- Johann Baptist Neruda (c. 1707–1780), Czech composer
- Josef Neruda (1807–1875), Czech organist, great-grandson of Johann Baptist Neruda
- Maria Neruda (1838–1911), Czech-Swedish violinist, daughter of Josef Neruda
- Pablo Neruda (1904–1973), Chilean poet, writer and socialist politician, Nobel laureate for Literature
- Wilma Neruda (1838–1911), Czech violinist, daughter of Josef Neruda

== See also ==
- Neruda (disambiguation)
