= Neruda =

Neruda may refer to:

== People ==
- Neruda (surname), a list of people with the surname
  - Alois Neruda (1837–1899) Czech cellist
  - Jan Neruda (1834–1891), Czech journalist, writer, and poet
  - Johann Baptist Georg Neruda (Czech: Jan Křtitel Jiří Neruda; c. 1708–c. 1780), classical Czech composer
  - Josef Neruda (1804–1876), Czech composer (associated with a celebrated Czech Polka) and singing teacher (taught Teresa Stolz)
  - Josef Neruda (1807–1875), Moravian organist and music teacher
  - Pablo Neruda (1904–1973), Chilean poet-diplomat and politician
  - Wilma Neruda (1839–1911), Czech violinist

== Arts and entertainment ==
- Neruda (album), 1983 studio album by Canadian band Red Rider
- Quilapayún Chante Neruda, 1983 compilation music album by Quilapayún
- Neruda, 2004 album by jazz artist Luciana Souza featuring the work of Pablo Neruda
- Neruda (film), 2016 Chilean film about Pablo Neruda

== Astronomy ==
- 1875 Neruda, a main-belt asteroid
- Neruda (crater), a crater on Mercury

== Other uses ==
- Neruda (genus), a subgenus of the butterfly genus Heliconius, in the family Nymphalidae
