= Anna Norrie =

Swedish opera singer

Anna Norrie in a 1903 production of Sköna Helena (La belle Hélène)

Anna Hilda Charlotta Norrie née Petterson (1860–1957) was a Swedish actress and operetta singer. After training under Julius Günther at the Sockholm Conservatory, she took singing lessons with Fritz Arlberg. She was engaged by the Nya teatern in 1882 where she performed leading operetta roles. But it was not until 1887 at the Vasa Teatern that she reached her peak, gaining popularity as La belle Hélène or Le petit duc. Until her retirement in 1920, she was acclaimed as the operetta prima donna of the North, singing on tour in Helsinki, Bremen, Leipzig, Hannover and Berlin. During the First World War years, she moved to Copenhagen where she ran the literary cabaret Edderkoppen which closed in 1919.

== Early life ==
Born in Stockholm on 7 February 1860, Anna Hilda Charlotta Pettersson was the daughter of the restaurateur Anna Christina Pettersson and the physician Samuel Magnus Axel Könsberg. In 1891, she married the Danish theatre director William Good Norrie (1866–1946) and in 1909, the actor Anton Frithiof de Verdier (1878–1954). When she was 17, she was admitted to the Stockholm Conservatory where she studied voice under Julius Günther. She was later a pupil of the opera singer Fritz Arlberg for voice and of the actor Emil Hillberg for drama.

== Career ==
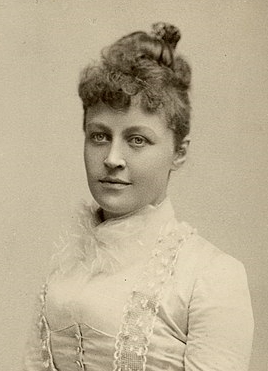
Anna Norrie (1884)

Norrie initially performed as an actress at the Nya Teatern where in 1882 she made her début as Antoinette in Édouard Pailleron's play L'Étincelle (in Swedish Gnistan). When she played the male role of Lars Hjortsberg in Karl Wetterhoff's En repetition på Tillfälle gör tjufven, she sang a ballad so well that she was engaged by the theatre to perform a series of operetta roles. Among these were Offenbach's La fille du tambour-major (Tamburmajorens dotter) and Carl Millöcker's Der Bettelstudent in which she demonstrated her tomboy charms and her comic abilities. In 1883, after further study under the demanding opera singer Signe Hebbe, she was highly acclaimed for her performance in Victorien Sardou's Le Roi Carotte. As a result, she was able to spend the next three years singing in operettas at Södra Teatern and Djurgårdsteatern.

Silent footage of Norrie performing an aria from Sköna Helena in 1903

In 1887, Norrie embarked on a long engagement at the Vasa Theatre where she gained a reputation as the leading operetta prima donna of the North. She achieved considerable success in La belle Hélène, La Grande-Duchesse de Gérolstein, Barbe-bleue, Fatinitza, Le petit duc, Orphée aux enfers and many others. She was equally successful on her tours to Helsinki, Bremen, Leipzig, Hannover and Berlin. Although she formally retired from the stage in 1920, on occasion she appeared in speaking parts. For example in 1932 she played Queen Desideria in Herbert Grevenius's Den förste Bernadotten at the Stockholm Concert Hall.

When she was 73, she turned to teaching, basing her approach on the strict rules of enunciation and movement she had learnt from Hebbe. Among her many students were Signe Hasso, Ingrid Bergman, Gunn Wållgren, Sif Ruud, Gerd Hagman, Viveca Lindfors, Birgitta Valberg, Anita Björk, Margaretha Krook, Yvonne Lombard, Ingrid Thulin, Gunnar Björnstrand, Sven Lindberg, Ulf Palme, Ingvar Kjellson, Jarl Kulle, Jan-Olof Strandberg and Max von Sydow.

Anna Norrie died in Stockholm on 13 July 1957 and was buried in Solna's Norra begravningsplatsen.
