= Janet Milne Rae =

Scottish novelist and missionary (1844–1933)

- Born: Janet Gibb; 8 July 1844; Willowbank, Aberdeen, Scotland
- Died: 24 April 1933 (aged 88)
- Other name: Mrs. Milne Rae
- Occupations: novelist, missionary
- Known for: middlebrow novels
- Spouse: Rev. George Milne Rae
- Children: four, including Lettice Milne Rea (novelist), Olive Rae (actress)
- Parents: Alexander Gibb (father); Margaret Smith (mother)

Janet Milne Rae (née Gibb; 8 July 1844 – 24 April 1933), usually known as Mrs. Milne Rae, was a Scottish novelist and missionary born in Willowbank, Aberdeen. She began writing fiction while living in India, starting with Morag: A Tale of Highland Life in 1872.

== Life ==
Janet Gibb lost her mother, Margaret Smith, at the age of 12 and her civil engineer father, Alexander Gibb, at the age of 20. She married a graduate of the University of Aberdeen, Rev. George Milne Rae, and the couple went out as missionaries to Madras, India. Her husband taught at the University and Madras Christian College. They returned to Edinburgh in about 1891.

In Scotland, George Milne Rea published The Syrian Church in India (1892) and Connection between Old and New Testaments (1904) and was prominent in the United Free Church of Scotland. In the first of those books, he argued against the theory that St Thomas the Apostle had preached in India, explaining the assertion as an example of a tradition migrating with the people who believed in it, the Nestorians. He died in 1917. Mrs Milne Rae died in Edinburgh in 1933. She is buried in Dean Cemetery with her husband and three of their children.

The Milne Raes had four children, of whom the third, Lettice Milne Rea (1882–1959), was likewise a novelist and local historian. Their eldest daughter, Olive Rae (1878–1933), became an Edwardian musical comedy actress in London and on tour in Britain.

== Works ==
Rae began to write "middlebrow" novels and shorter works of fiction while she was in India, her first being Morag: A Tale of Highland Life.

Her works include:

- Morag: A Tale of Highland Life (London: James Nesbit & Co., 1872)
- Geordie's Tryst: A Tale of Scottish Life (London: RTS, 1874)
- Marion's Story; or, Softly All My Years (London: Hodder and Stoughton, 1879)
- Hartleigh Towers: A Story of English Life (London: W. Isbister, 1880)
- Dan Stapleton's Last Race (London: Marshall Japp & Co., c. 1881)
- Rinaultrie (T. Nelson & Sons, 1887)
- Bride Lorraine (London: Leisure Hour Monthly Library, c. 1905)
- The Testing of Clem (London: RTS, 1909)
- A Bottle in the Smoke: A Tale of Anglo-Indian Life (London: Hodder & Stoughton, 1912)
- The Whipping Boy, etc. (Gay & Hancock, 1914)
- The Awakening of Priscilla (Stirling: Drummond's Twopenny Stories, 1929)

She was also the editor of The Life Beautiful. A Selection of Passages from Faber (1907).
