= Ludvig Schytte =

Danish composer, pianist, and teacher

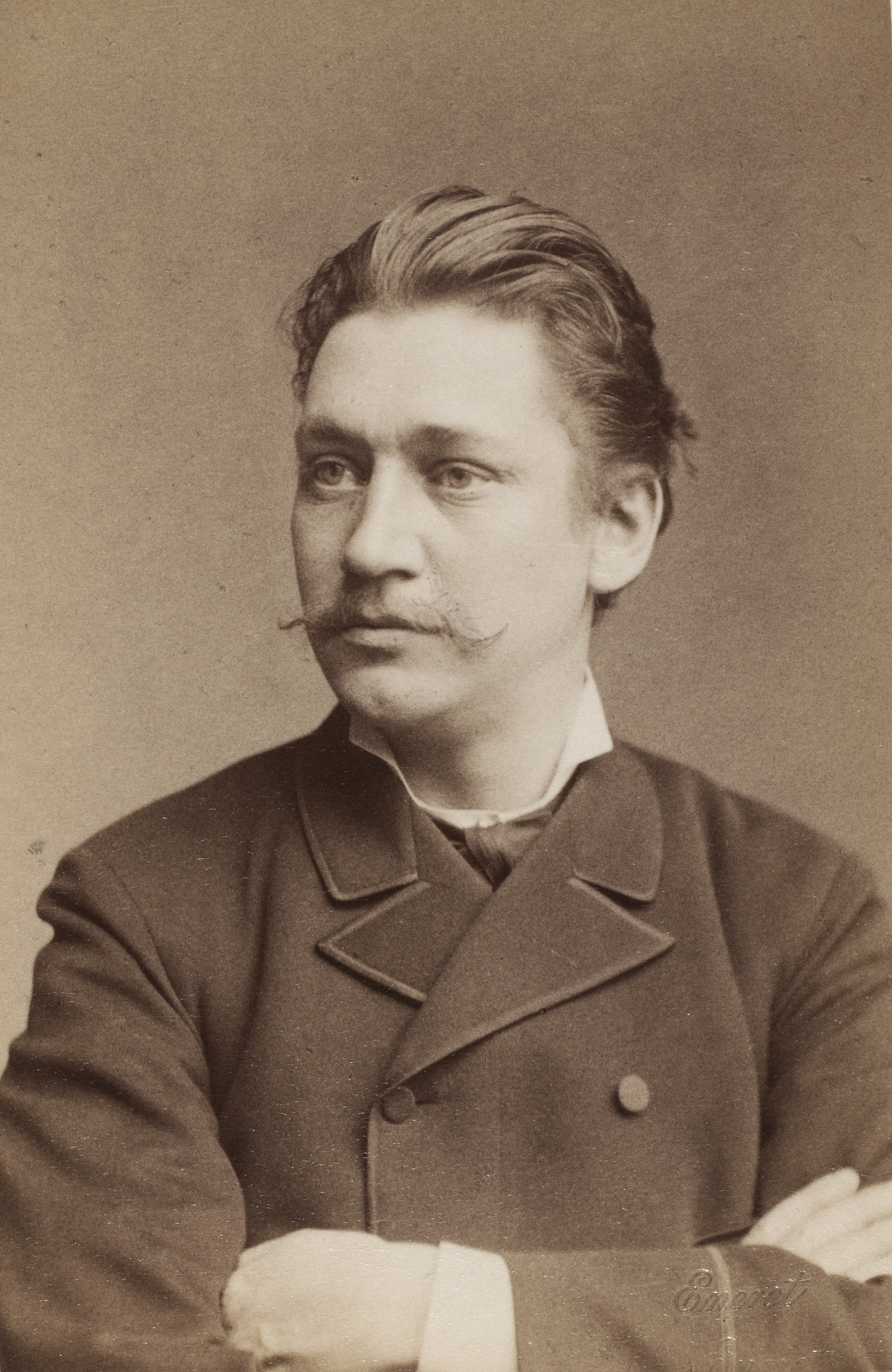
Ludvig Schytte

Ludvig Schytte (28 April 1848 – 10 November 1909) was a Danish composer, pianist, and teacher.

Born in Aarhus, Denmark, Schytte originally trained as a pharmacist. He studied with Niels Gade and Edmund Neupert. In 1884, he travelled to Germany to study with Franz Liszt. Schytte lived and taught in Vienna between 1886 and 1907 and spent the last two years of his life teaching in Berlin, where he died. His daughter Anna Schytte was also a composer and pianist.

Schytte composed a Piano Concerto in C-sharp minor, Opus 28, and a Sonata in B-flat, among numerous other piano works. He also wrote two operas: Hero (25 September 1898 in Copenhagen) and Der Mameluk (22 December 1903 in Vienna). His shorter works are still used today as educational studies for piano students.

== Literature ==
- School of modern pianoforte virtuosity (Schule des höheren Klavierspiels: technische Studien bis zur höchsten Ausbildung). Edited by Moriz Rosenthal and Ludvig Schytte. Berlin, ca. 1890.
- Die Schule des modernen Klavierspiels ... School of Modern Pianoforte Playing. A Collection of Studies as Introduction to Modern Harmony, Melody, Rhythm and Style. Op. 174, etc. London: A. Lengnick & Co, 1912.
