= Albert Mallinson =

British organist and composer

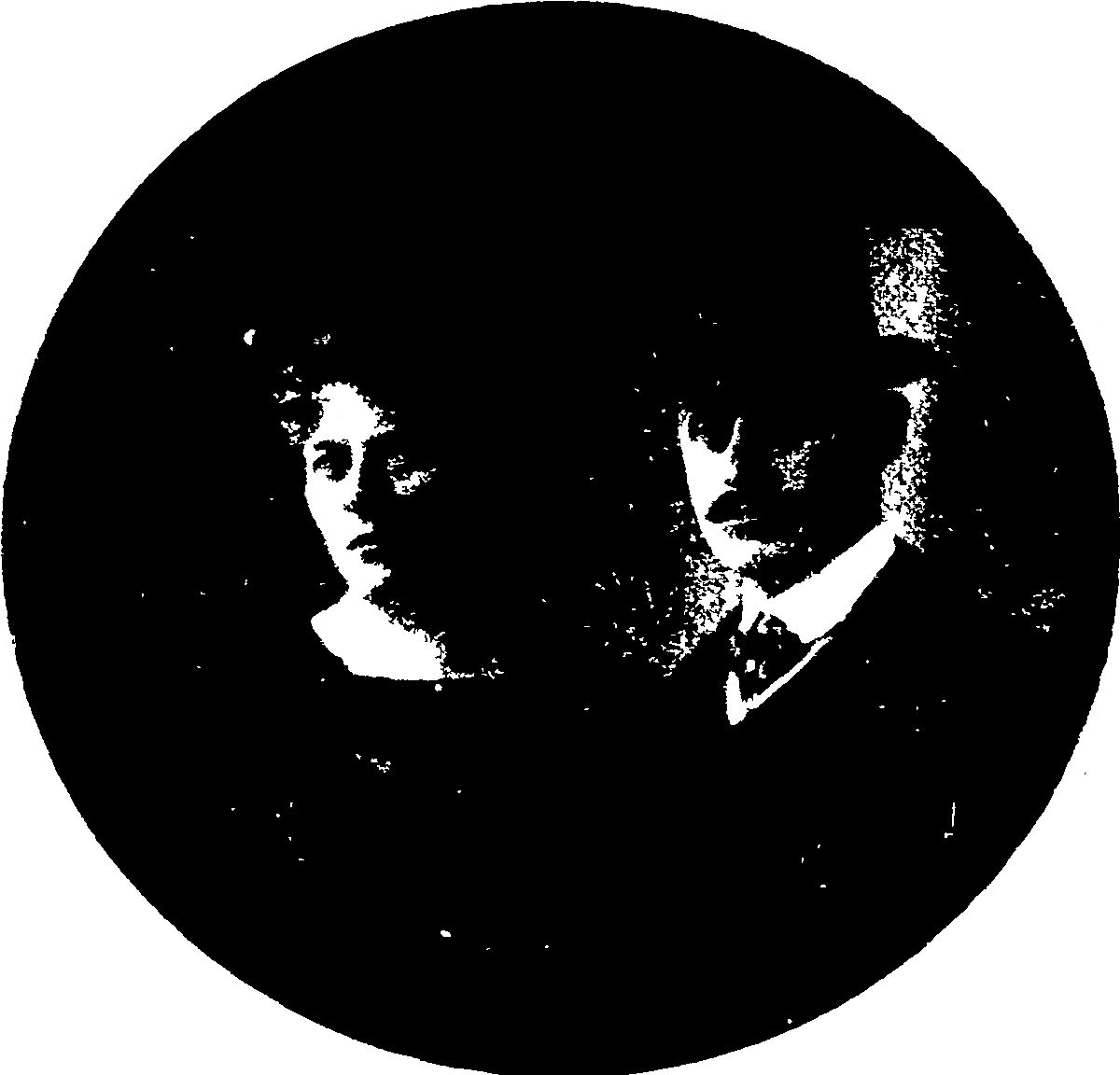
Albert Mallinson and his wife Anna Sophie Balmson Steinhauer in 1908

Albert Mallinson (13 November 1870 – 5 April 1946) was a British organist and composer who wrote 400 songs, a cantata, some chamber and orchestral pieces and church music but whose work is largely forgotten today.

== Early life ==
James Albert Mallinson was born in Leeds in Yorkshire in 1870 to Harriet Ann née Thompson (1828–1890) and James Mallinson (1824–1890), a cloth dresser and milliner. He commenced his musical career as an organist, being at the age of 17 simultaneously organist to the late Hon. Mrs. Emily Meynell-Ingram at Temple Newsam, organist and choirmaster at St. Chad's Church in Leeds, and deputy organist at Leeds Parish Church. Prior to this he had studied under Dr. Creser, late organist of the Chapel Royal, St. James's. At the age of 18 he had produced at concerts given by himself at Leeds, a quartet for piano and strings, and a trio for piano and strings. In consequence of ill-health he was compelled to seek a warmer climate, and for some years from 1891 resided in Australia, where he devoted himself to composition, with occasional concerts and teaching.

== Musical career ==
He held various appointments as organist in Melbourne and while in Australia his dramatic work Tegner's Drapa based on the work by Longfellow, for solo-voice, chorus and orchestra, was performed by the Melbourne Liedertafel and the Sydney Philharmonic, and his ballad for male chorus, 'The Battle of the Baltic' by the Royal Metropolitan Liedertafel. While touring in New Zealand he met the soprano Anna Sophie Balmson Steinhauer (1858–1949), a widow and celebrated Danish lieder singer whom he married in 1894 and returning to Europe toured Denmark and Germany with her, giving song-recitals. The couple also later made several tours in Australia, South Africa and Scandinavia. The two regularly appeared on the concert platform together when he would accompany his wife in concerts dedicated in part or entirely to his compositions. In February 1900 the soprano Olive Rae gave a recital at the Steinway Hall in which she sang three songs by Mallinson. On 22 November 1901 Steinhauer and Mallinson gave the first of several concerts at the Bechstein Hall to feature a selection of Mallinson's works (including his song cycle 'My Garden') in addition to little heard works from the Scandinavian composers Peter Heise and Fritz Arlberg.

He composed over 400 songs. A Freemason, in 1904 he was initiated into the Lodge of Honour and Friendship No. 1266 in Blandford in Dorset, where he was then living. In 1904 he and his wife performed some of his songs before Queen Alexandra at Buckingham Palace, and in 1905 he gave recitals of his own compositions at Dresden. In 1906 he gave a series of seven recitals at the Bechstein Hall in London, the programmes of which were exclusively devoted to songs of his own composition, sung by his wife and Ada Crossley. From 1898 to 1903 Mallinson held the post of private organist to Viscount Portman. A series of organ recitals given by him, on the beautiful Cavaille-Col organ in Jesus Church, Copenhagen, aroused exceptional interest among musicians in that city. From 1904 he resided at Dresden, where he acted as organist at the English Church. He was an admirable accompanist, and visited London every year to give a series of song-recitals together with his wife, which were among the principal events of the musical season. His pieces 'Four by the Clock' and 'We Sway Along the Ridges' were played at the Promenade Concerts at the Royal Albert Hall in 1910.

In his latter years James Albert Mallinson lived at Elsinore in Denmark and here he died in 1946. In his will he left £10,658 9s 4d to his widow.

A recording of his 'New Year Song' sung by the contralto Ada Crossley accompanied by Christopher H. H. Booth on the piano was released on the album From Melba to Sutherland: Australian Singers on Record released by Decca in 2016.

== Selected songs ==
- A birthday (Text: Christina Georgina Rossetti)
- Abendstunde
- A garden is a lovesome thing (Text: T. E. Brown)
- All the breath and the bloom of the year (Text: Robert Browning)
- A Lament for the Summer
- Auf Wiedersehen (Text: James Russell Lowell)
- Autumn
- A wild rose (Text: Alfred Austin)
- Baby
- Bed in Summer (Text: Robert Louis Stevenson)
- Blue Eyes of Spring (in Lyrics from other lands : eight songs) (Text: Anonymous after Heinrich Heine)
- Boy Johnny (Text: Christina Georgina Rossetti)
- Canoe Song
- Daybreak (Text: Henry Wadsworth Longfellow)
- Divination by a Daffodil
- Dream of a blessed spirit (Text: William Butler Yeats)
- Ein Geburtstag (Text: Anonymous after Christina Georgina Rossetti)
- Eldorado (Text: Edgar Allan Poe)
- Elëanore (Text: Eric Mackay)
- Float, little boat
- Four by the Clock (Text: Henry Wadsworth Longfellow)
- From my arm-chair (Text: Henry Wadsworth Longfellow)
- Gloriana
- In the Appleboughs
- Intra Muros
- Life's Rose (Text: W. E. Henley)
- My Garden (song cycle)
- My Heart, the Bird of the Wilderness (Text: Rabindranath Tagore)
- My Love's like the red, red Rose
- New Year Song
- On the Way to Kew (Text: William Ernest Henley)
- Over the Western Sea (Text: William Ernest Henley)
- Seven Songs (Text: Christina Georgina Rossetti)
- Sing! Break into Song
- Slow horses, slow (Text: Thomas Westwood)
- Snowflakes
- Songs of Lesbos (six songs) (Text: Sappho)
- The Golden Rose of Mitylene (eleven songs) (Text: Sappho)
- The Old Bridge at Florence (Text: Henry Wadsworth Longfellow)
- There is a Measure Set to all Things Mortal
- There is a Medler-Tree
- There lies the warmth of summer (Text: H. Harper after Heinrich Heine)
- The sunrise wakes the lark to sing (Text: Christina Georgina Rossetti)
- To an Isle in the Water (Text: William Butler Yeats)
- To me at my fifth-floor window (Text: William Ernest Henley)
- Violet
- We Sway Along the Ridges (Text: William Ernest Henley)
- What comes? (Text: Christina Georgina Rossetti)
- When e'er I gaze within thine eyes (Text: Anonymous after Heinrich Heine)
