= Mohelno =

- Market town
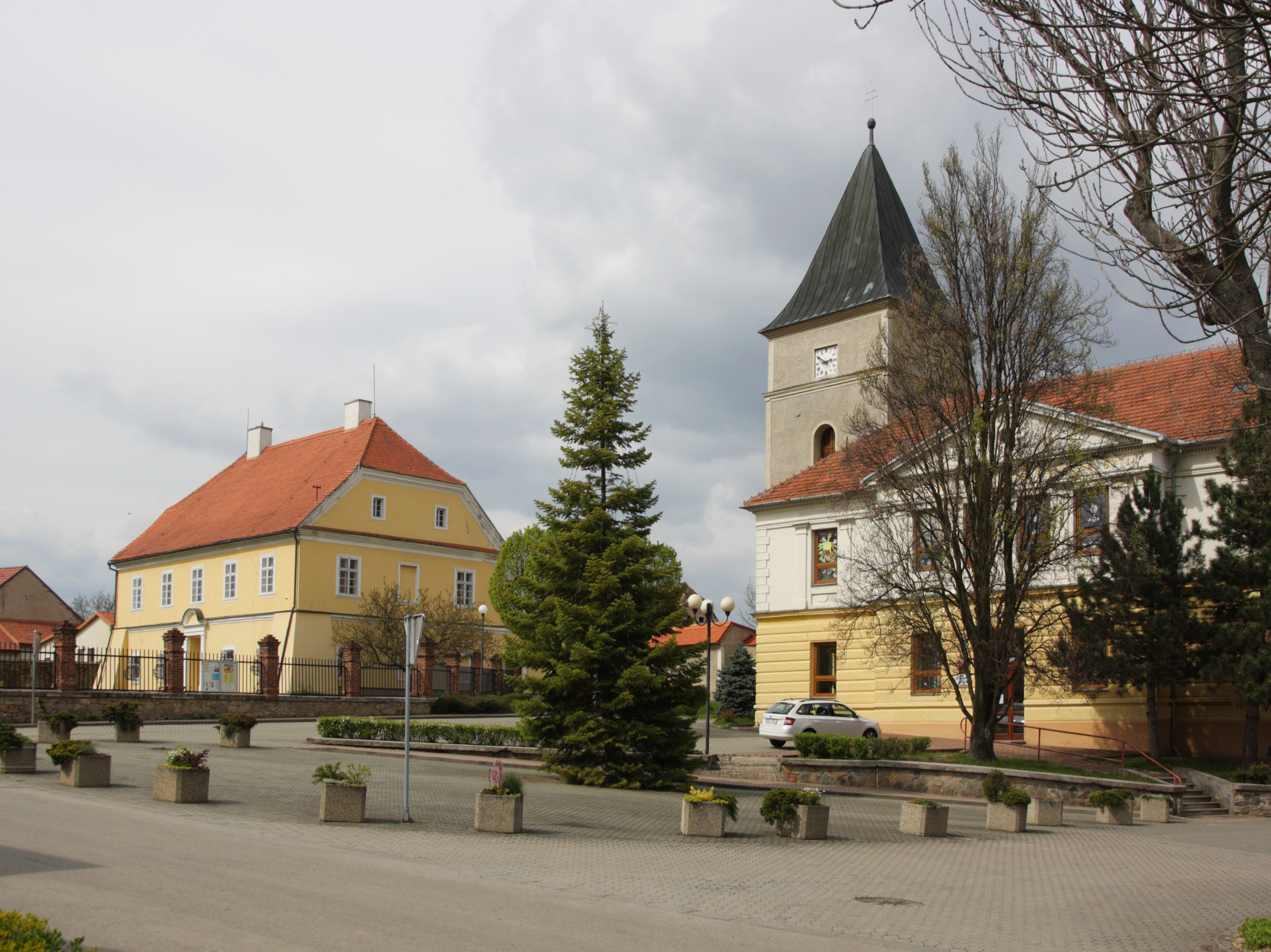
- Town square

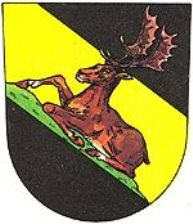
- Flag Coat of arms

- Location in the Czech Republic
- Coordinates: 49°6′51″N 16°11′25″E
- Country: Czech Republic
- Region: Vysočina
- District: Třebíč
- First mentioned: 1234

Area
  - Total: 17.53 km^{2} (6.77 sq mi)
- Elevation: 345 m (1,132 ft)

Population (2026-01-01)
  - Total: 1,383
  - Density: 78.89/km^{2} (204.3/sq mi)
- Time zone: UTC+1 (CET)
  - Summer (DST): UTC+2 (CEST)
- Postal code: 675 75
- Website: mohelno-obec.cz

Mohelno (Czech pronunciation: [ˈmoɦɛlno]) is a market town in Třebíč District in the Vysočina Region of the Czech Republic. It has about 1,400 inhabitants.

== Geography ==
Mohelno is located about 25 kilometres (16 mi) southeast of Třebíč and 31 km (19 mi) southwest of Brno. It lies in the Jevišovice Uplands. The highest point is at 452 m (1,483 ft) above sea level. The market town is situated on the left bank of the Jihlava River, which forms the southern municipal border, and on the shore of the Mohelno Reservoir, built on the Jihlava.

Most of the Mohelenská hadcová step National Nature Reserve, which is located along the Jihlava River, lies in the territory of Mohelno. The reserve is protected for scree forests and serpentinite heat-loving oak forests, and related fauna and flora.

== History ==
The oldest archaeological finds proving Slavic settlement date from the 11th and 12th centuries. The first written mention of Mohelno is in a deed of Moravian Margrave Přemysl from 1234. In the years 1237–1349, the royal burgrave was based in Mohelno and the county offices were located here. From 1527, the village was part of the Náměšť estate.

== Demographics ==
Historical population

| Year | Pop. | ±% |
|---|---|---|
| 1869 | 1,098 | — |
| 1880 | 1,171 | +6.6% |
| 1890 | 1,185 | +1.2% |
| 1900 | 1,278 | +7.8% |
| 1910 | 1,306 | +2.2% |

| Year | Pop. | ±% |
|---|---|---|
| 1921 | 1,403 | +7.4% |
| 1930 | 1,521 | +8.4% |
| 1950 | 1,338 | −12.0% |
| 1961 | 1,537 | +14.9% |
| 1970 | 1,524 | −0.8% |

| Year | Pop. | ±% |
|---|---|---|
| 1980 | 1,487 | −2.4% |
| 1991 | 1,401 | −5.8% |
| 2001 | 1,429 | +2.0% |
| 2011 | 1,368 | −4.3% |
| 2021 | 1,307 | −4.5% |

Source: Censuses

== Transport ==
There are no railways or major roads passing through the municipality.

== Sights ==
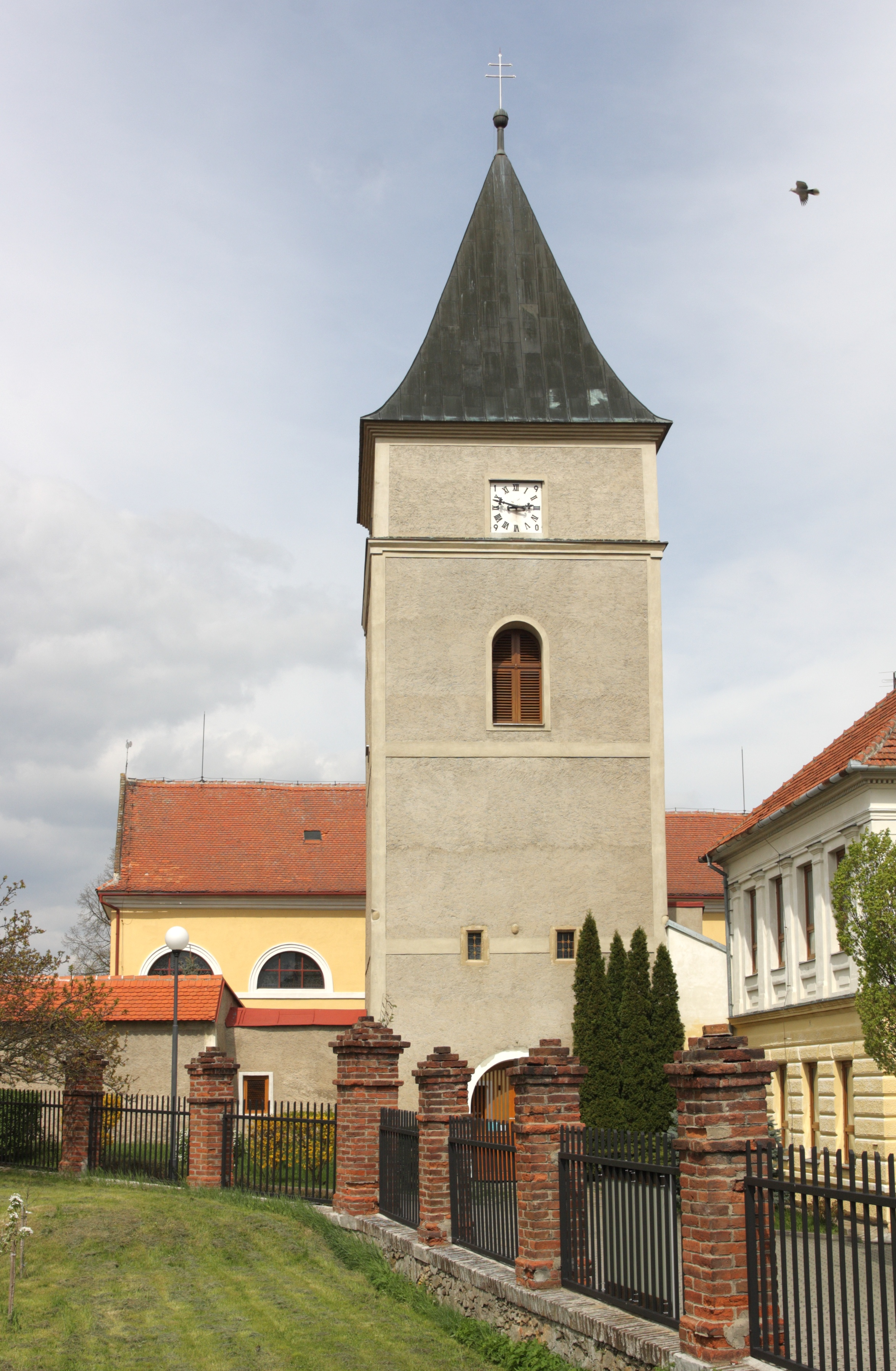
Bell tower

The main landmark is the Church of All Saints. It is a Neoclassical building with a Gothic core. The church area consist of the church, a rectory and a separate bell tower.

== Notable people ==
- Josef Neruda (1807–1875), organist and music teacher
