= Olive Rae =

Scottish soprano and actress (1878–1933)

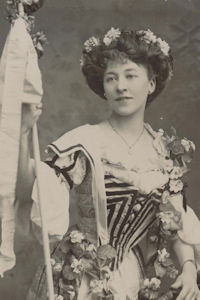
Olive Rae as the May Queen in Merrie England (1902)

Olive Margaret Milne Rae (1878–1933) was a Scottish soprano concert singer and actress who appeared in comic opera and Edwardian musical comedy in London and on tours of the British provinces. During her brief stage career, she played the May Queen during the original production of Merrie England (1902) and created the roles of Titania in A Princess of Kensington (1903) and Lady Violet in The Earl and the Girl (1903–04).

== Early life ==
Rae was born in Madras in India in 1878, the oldest of four children of the Rev. George Milne Rae D.D. (1840–1917) and Janet née Gibb (1844–1933) who had gone out as missionaries to Madras where her father taught at the university and at Madras Christian College. Her mother, writing as Janet Milne Rae, was a Scottish novelist. By 1891 the family had returned to Edinburgh, Scotland, where Olive Rae lived with her parents and siblings Maitland Milne Rae (1880–1961) Lettice Milne Rae (1882–1959) and Grace Milne Rae (1886–). During this period, her father published The Syrian Church in India (1892) and Connection between Old and New Testaments (1904), and was prominent in the United Free Church of Scotland. Rae studied in Paris under Jacques Bouhy; The Tatler later commented that "her style and method certainly do the famous Parisian teacher and his pupil infinite credit."

== Career ==
Rae made her first public appearances in Oxford, while her London début was at the Salle Érard on 27 February 1900 in her own recital, in which her performance was described as "fresh, clear soprano ... much taste ... great distinctness". She followed this later the same year with an appearances at the Steinway Hall and the Derby Temperance Hall with the bass Sydney Poyser, when they were both praised "for the charm and intelligence of their performances". Rae's command of multiple languages meant she was as comfortable in Massenet's "Si tu veux, Mignonne" as Brahms's "Feldeinsamkeit", as well as in three songs by British composer Albert Mallinson. She went on to sing with the Bath Orpheus Glee Society and at several other provincial venues. In December 1901 she and Poyser made their début at the prestigious Bechstein Hall in London. with the reviewer of The Tatler writing of her:

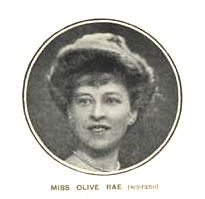
Olive Rae in 1901

Miss Rae's voice is a bright and flexible soprano of most sympathetic quality, which she uses with great taste and intelligence. She gave an admirable rendering of a dozen songs in French, German, Italian, and English, revealing a quite remarkable purity of enunciation and no little distinction of style. Miss Rae is still very young, and in addition to her accomplishments as a singer she has a singularly bright and attractive personality.

She joined the D'Oyly Carte Opera Company at the Savoy Theatre, replacing Joan Keddie as the May Queen during the original production of Merrie England (1902), continuing in the role during the following 14-week tour of the provinces and again in the subsequent revival at the Savoy (November 1902 to January 1903). Next Rae created the role of Titania in A Princess of Kensington (1903) at the Savoy, continuing in the role in the subsequent tour commencing in May 1903. After this, she left D'Oyly Carte and created the small role of Lady Violet in The Earl and the Girl at the Adelphi Theatre and the Lyric Theatre (1903–04). While performing in this musical in the evenings, she played the Princess in 23 matinee performances of Little Hans Andersen at the Adelphi Theatre.

After this, she returned to her family in Scotland, where she gave concerts, for example at St Andrews in 1909. In 1911 she listed her occupation as "Concert Singer", at which time she was living alone near Kensington Square in London. She never married.

Rae died in Edinburgh in 1933 aged 55 and was buried there with her parents and two of her siblings in the Dean Cemetery.
