= Sher-Gil (crater) =

Crater on Mercury

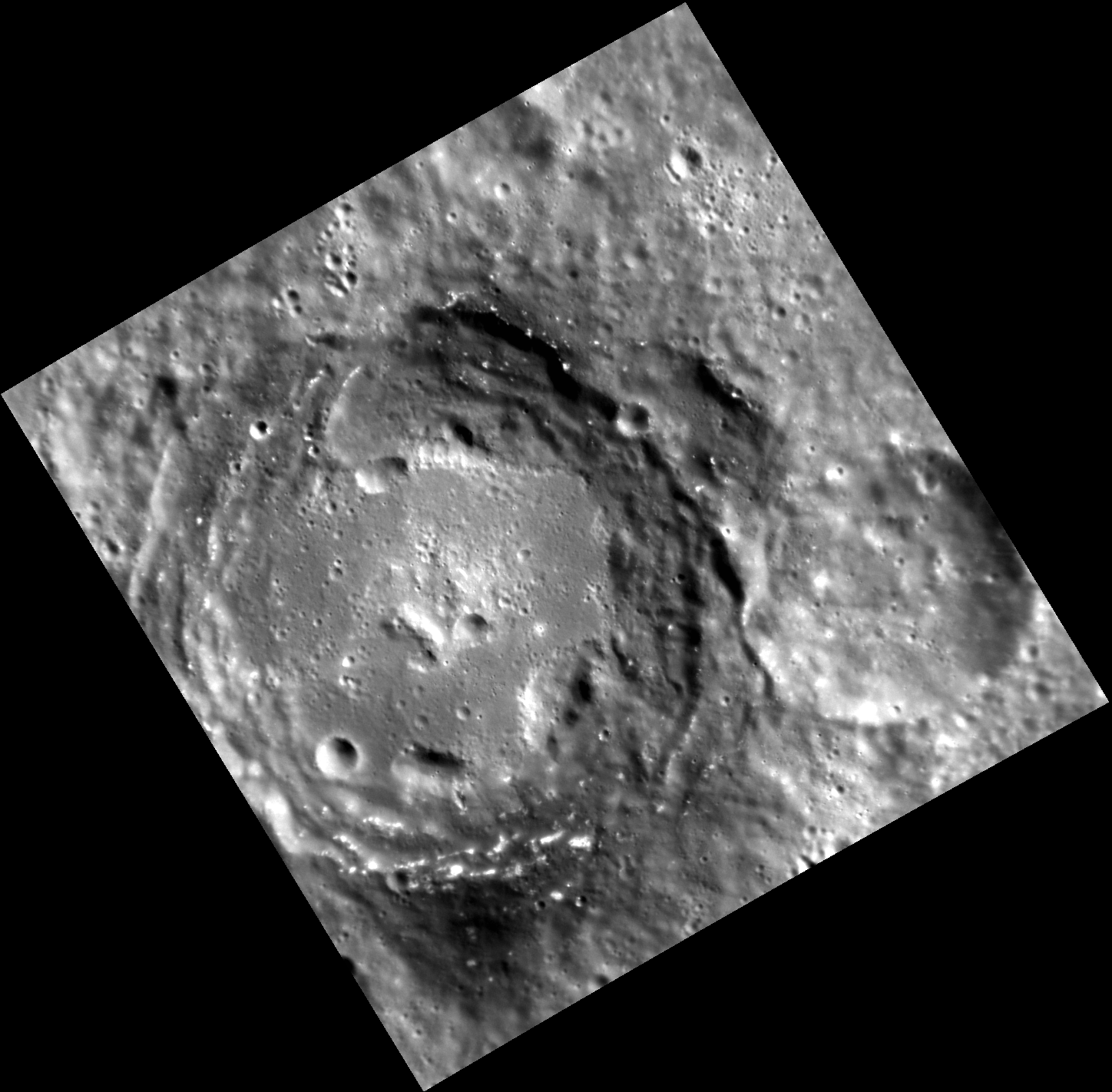
- MESSENGER image
- Planet: Mercury
- Coordinates: 45.26°S 225.26°W
- Quadrangle: Neruda
- Diameter: 77 km (48 mi)
- Eponym: Amrita Sher-Gil

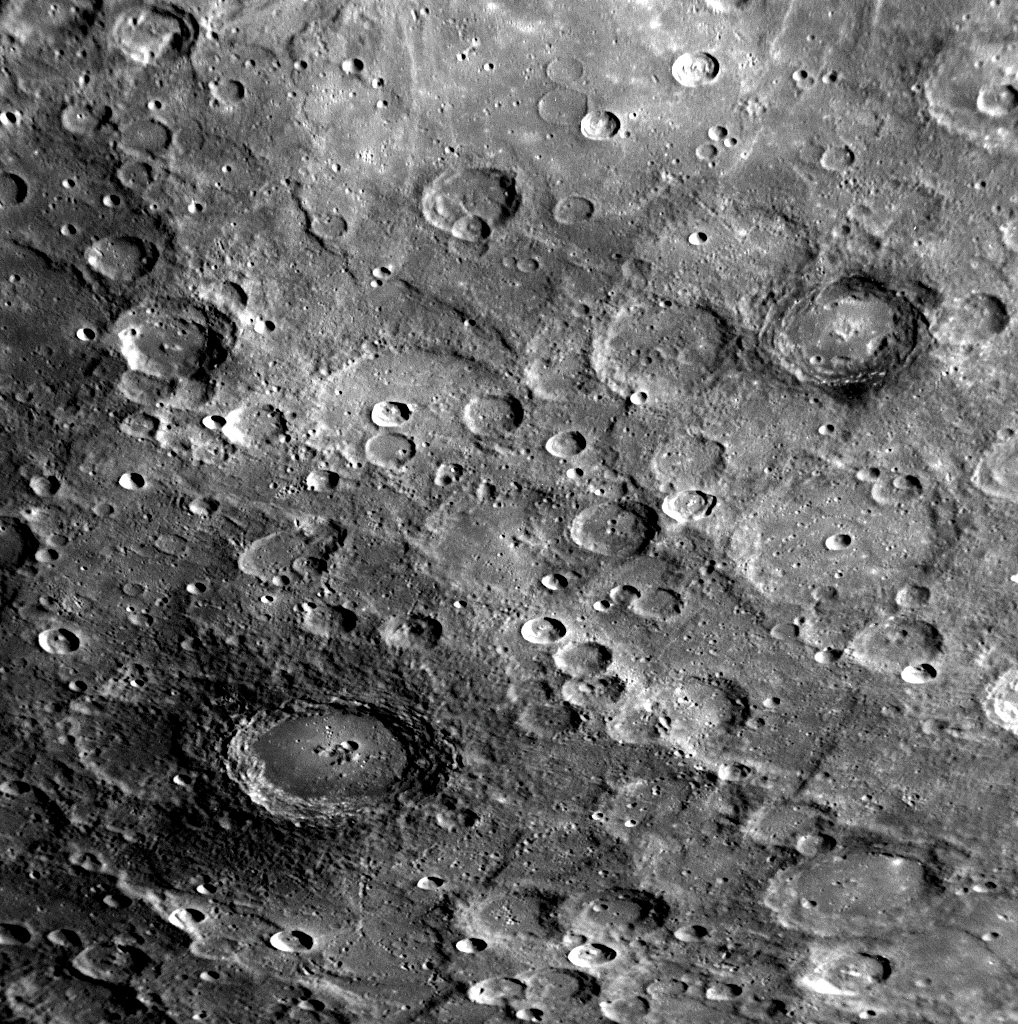
Neruda and Sher-Gil craters

Sher-Gil is a crater on Mercury, named by the International Astronomical Union in 2016 after the Indian painter Amrita Sher-Gil. Hollows are present. To its southwest is Neruda crater.

Irregular depressions within the crater are evidence of explosive volcanism.
