= Anna Schytte =

Danish composer, pianist, and teacher

Anna Johanne Schytte, also known as Anna Jutta Schytte (20 November 1877 - 16 March 1953) was a Danish composer, pianist, and teacher who performed throughout Europe and recorded for Welte Mignon reproducing pianos.

Schytte was born in Copenhagen. Her father and first music teacher was the composer Ludwig Schytte. Later, she studied music with Ove Christensen, Franz Neruda and Julius Rontgen in the Netherlands, and with Alfred Reisenauer and Ignaz Friedman in Germany.

Schytte gave piano performances in Amsterdam, Denmark (as the soloist in her father’s piano concerto), Germany (at the Leipzig Gewandhaus under conductor Arthur Nikisch), London, Paris (at the Salle Pleyel) and Stockholm. She performed with the Brussels Quartet and the Bohemian String Quartet, and taught in Copenhagen. She recorded her father’s Berceuse op. 26, Nr. 7, for Welte Mignon.

Schytte composed at least one piece for piano, Capriccietto, A Study in Staccato. Both her father and Ignaz Friedman dedicated compositions to her: Four Preludes, Opus 61 by Friedmann, and Petit Preludes, Opus 65 by Ludwig Schytte.
