= Alfred Reisenauer =

German musician (1863–1907)

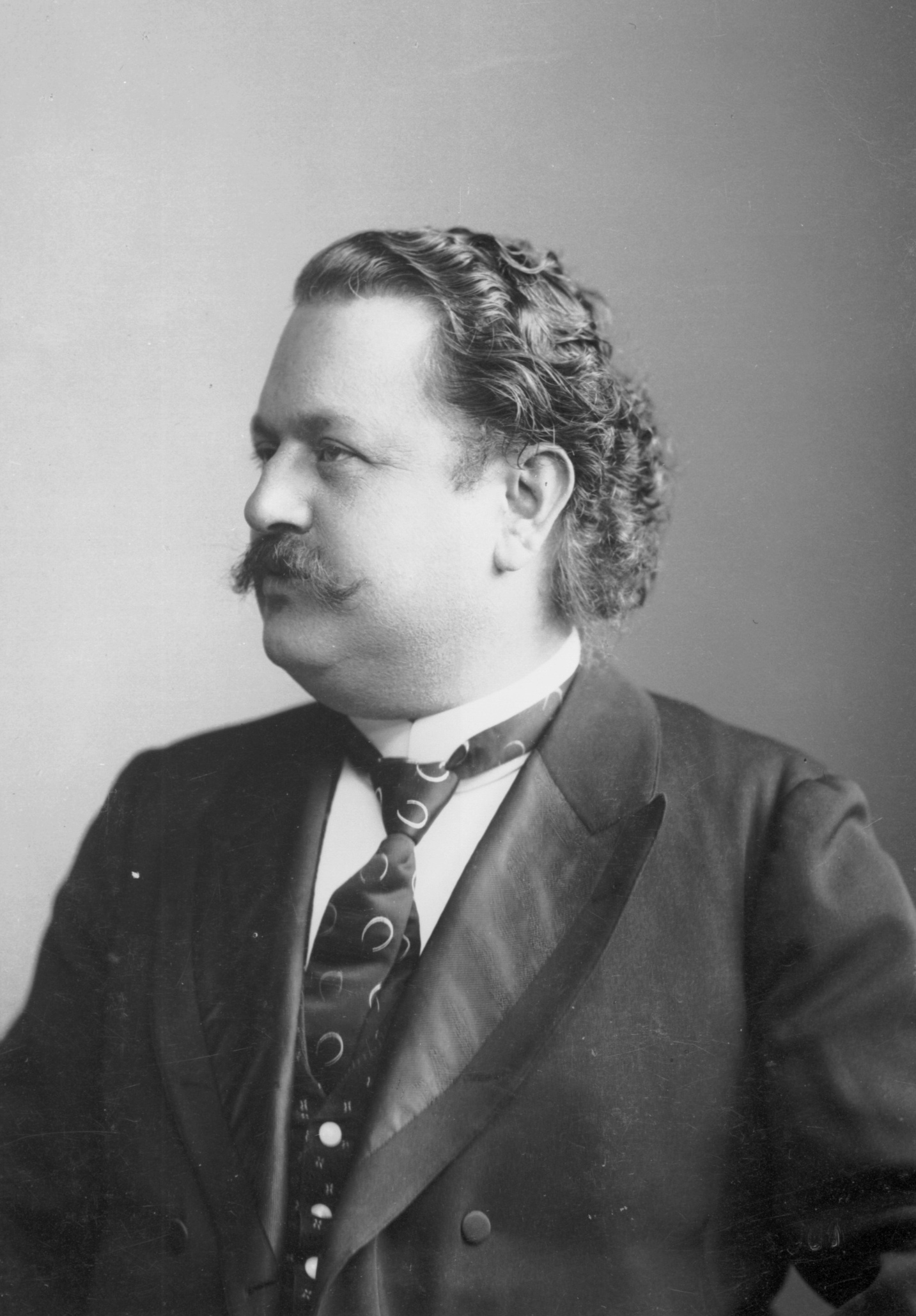
Portrait by J. C. Schaarwächter

Alfred Reisenauer (1 November 1863 – 3 October 1907) was a German pianist, composer, and music educator.

== Biography ==
Reisenauer was born in Königsberg. He was a pupil of Louis Köhler and Franz Liszt. As one of the most important piano teachers and players of his time, Reisenauer became principal professor of piano at the Sondershausen Conservatory in 1885. He was in Liszt's household when Liszt died in 1886 and was a torchbearer at the side of the coffin during the funeral procession. After beginning to teach piano at the Leipzig Conservatory in 1900, he was eventually appointed director of the same institution where his students included Sigfrid Karg-Elert, Sergei Bortkiewicz, Anatol von Roessel, and Anna Schytte.

Reisenauer led a highly successful career as a pianist, especially in Germany and Russia, and was well known for his sensitive playing, especially of Schumann. He also made a speciality of Liszt's virtuosic piano music. Starting in 1886 he toured Central Asia and Russia as far east as Siberia. On 10 April 1905, he recorded ten piano pieces for the Welte-Mignon player piano for M. Welte & Sohn at the Popper Studio in Leipzig. Reisenauer also set numerous lieder to music.

He was known to suffer from stage fright and sometimes appeared to be drunk on stage during a concert. He died suddenly at Liepāja (known in Germany as Libau) in 1907 during a concert tour.
