= Johann Baptist Neruda =

Czech conductor and violinist c.1708–c.1780

Johann Baptist Georg Neruda (Czech: Jan Křtitel Jiří Neruda, c. 1708 – c. 1780) was a Czech classical composer, violinist and cellist.

== Life ==
Neruda's dates of birth and death are only approximations (1708 according to the Grove Dictionary, other sources list 1707 or 1710). He was born in Rosice in Bohemia (today the Czech Republic), but it is unclear in which Rosice (either in Rosice near Chrudim or in today's part of Pardubice) to a well-respected musical family.

After spending his earlier years gaining a good reputation as a violinist and conductor in Prague and German lands, Neruda became Konzertmeister of the Dresden court orchestra. He died in Dresden around 1780. His sons Antonín and Ludvík were also members of Staatskapelle Dresden. Organist Josef Neruda was his great-grandson. Cellist Franz Xaver Neruda was his great-great-grandson. Violinists Wilma Neruda and Maria Neruda were his great-great-granddaughters.

== Works ==
His compositional output includes eighteen symphonies, fourteen instrumental concertos (including a trumpet and a bassoon concerto), sonatas, sacred works and an opera Les Troqueurs. One of the composer's most significant works is the Concerto for Solo Horn, 2 Violins, Violas with Basso continuo written for Johann Georg Knechtel.. The piece, which is in the key of E♭ major, is played using only the high register. Nowadays, it is rarely performed on anything other than an E-flat or B-flat trumpet.

Incidentally, the horn, named "corno da caccia" (hunting horn), for which Neruda wrote the piece, is not to be confused with the 4-valved corno da caccia, played by trumpet players, which has recently been given the same name. Horns are played using a conical mouthpieces while trumpets – and the modern Corno da caccia as well – are played using semi-spherical mouthpieces.

The manuscript for this piece is in the National Library in Prague, along with several other unusual works for brass instruments.

== Legacy ==
The Neruda crater on Mercury is named in honour of both him and fellow Czech, the poet, journalist, writer and art critic Jan Neruda.

== Bibliography ==
- Neruda, Johann Baptist Georg; Annegret Rosenmüller (2006). Sei sonate a tre für Violino I, Violino II und Basso continuo. Beeskow: Ortus. OCLC 70912463.
- Ottenberg, Hans-Günter; Zdenka Pilková (1984). The Symphony in Dresden: ten symphonies. New York: Garland. ISBN 0-8240-3850-9. Contains a symphony in A written between 1745 and 1770 by Neruda (name given as Jan Křtitel Jiří Neruda)
