= Fritz Arlberg =

Swedish singer and composer

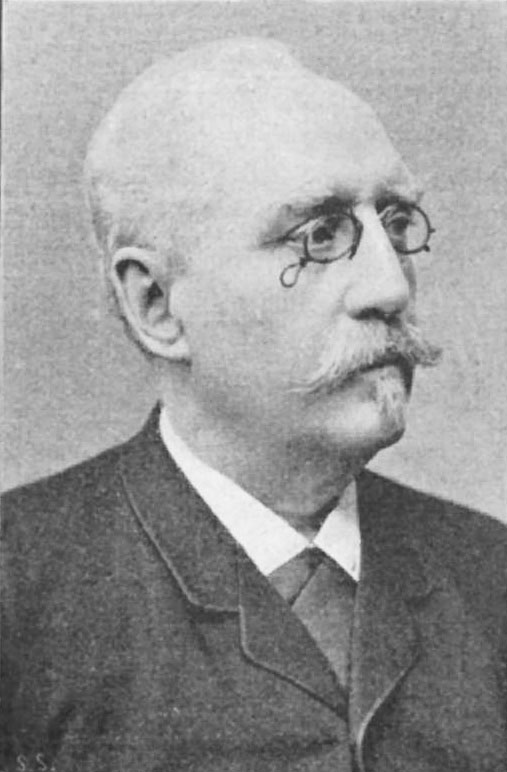
Fritz Arlberg c1896

Fritz Georg Efraim Arlberg (21 March 1830 – 21 February 1896) was a Swedish baritone, teacher, composer, opera singer, translator of opera libretti and member of the Royal Swedish Academy of Music.

== Biography ==
Arlberg in the 1870s

Arlberg was born in Leksand in 1830, the son of Georg Arlberg and Margareta Lovisa Salmark. He became a student at Uppsala University in 1848 from where he graduated in 1852. He then worked for a time as an official, among others, in the Chamber College. He commenced writing musical compositions from early in his career and during his time at Uppsala he attracted attention through his singing voice. Arlberg studied singing with Julius Günther and the German tenor Wieser. He débuted at the Mindre teatern in Stockholm in 1854 as Farinelli, but soon transitioned to the Royal Swedish Opera where he débuted as Figaro in The Marriage of Figaro and had employment there from 1858 to 1874. From 1860 to 1864 he was also sub-director and from 1864 to 1865 director at the Royal Swedish Opera. However, he left there in 1874 owing to some ill-treatment and instead took up employment at the Opera in Christiania, where he stayed until 1877. He appeared as a guest-singer at several theatres in Stockholm during this period, and until 1883, when he gave up his singing career. He then worked as a singing teacher, first in Stockholm and then in Copenhagen and finally in Christiania from 1894, where he died in 1896.

He was also active as a composer and writer. He translated and edited a number of operatic texts, including Rienzi and The Flying Dutchman. He also became one of the champions in Sweden for the works of Richard Wagner.

Arlberg was elected as member No. 420 of the Royal Swedish Academy of Music on 24 January 1868.

In 1868 he married the violinist Maria Neruda, sister of the cellist Franz Xaver Neruda and the violinist Wilma Neruda, and was the father of Hjalmar Arlberg. He also had a daughter, Judith, with the sculptor Ida Ericson-Molard.

In 1901 his Der Asra Op. 8 No. 3 was performed at the Promenade Concerts at the Royal Albert Hall by Albert Mallinson and his wife, the Swedish soprano Anna Sophie Steinhauer. He died in Christiania, then in Sweden.

== Theatre ==
=== Selected roles ===
Year	Role	Production	Theatre
1867	Nélusko, a slave	L'Africaine; Giacomo Meyerbeer	Royal Swedish Opera
1868	Jesper Swedberg	Lejonet vaknar Frans Hedberg	Royal Dramatic Theatre
1875	Count Almaviva	The Marriage of Figaro; Wolfgang Amadeus Mozart and Lorenzo da Ponte	Christiania Theatre
1875	Giorgio Germont, Alfredo's father	La traviata Giuseppe Verdi and Francesco Maria Piave	Christiania Theatre
1875	William Tell	William Tell; Gioacchino Rossini, Victor-Joseph Étienne de Jouy and Hippolyte Louis Florent Bis	Christiania Theatre
1878	Montlandry	Le Petit Duc; Henri Meilhac and Ludovic Halévy	Mindre teatern
1879	Gringoire	Niniche; Marius Boullard, Alfred Hennequin and Albert Millaud	Djurgårdsteatern
1880	Montlandry	Le Petit Duc; Henri Meilhac and Ludovic Halévy	Nya teatern

== Selected compositions ==
- In the Woods (symphonic poem)
- Solo Songs
- Offertorium
- Dreams (liederen)

Orchestral works in one movement:

- I skogen Tone Poem for Orchestra opus 10

Mixed choir a cappella

- Här har ljufva vännen vandrat ("Här den älskade har framgått")
- Tre svenska Folkvisor set for five-part choir

Voice and piano:

- Sten Sture, ballad for one voice and piano opus 7
- Svärmeri, Träumen

Voice and orchestra

- Opus 2: Zwei Lieder vom Tode
- Opus 3: Tägliche Übungen für Frauenstimme
- Opus 5: Songs at the piano (1870)
- Opus 6: Songs at the piano
- Opus 7: Sten Sture, ballad for tenor, baritone and orchestra(1875)
- Opus 8: Songs at the piano (1875)
- Opus 9: Folkeviser with piano
- Opus 10: I skogen, symphonic poem for orchestra (1877)
- Opus 11: Songs at the piano
- Opus 13: Waltz-etude for alto and piano
- Opus 14: Vier Lieder (to a text by Heinrich Heine)
- Opus 15: Song at Luthersfesten (choir with organ or piano) (1885)
- Opus 16: Vocalises
- Opus 17: Selmas tankar i våren

Piano:

- Album Leaves, Feuille d'Album

Translation of libretti by:

- Hin ondes läros pand: an opera by Johan August Söderman (1856)
- I Marocko: an opera by Joseph Dente (1866)
- Riccardo: an opera by Johan Herman Berens (1869)
- Rienzi: an opera by Richard Wagner
- The Flying Dutchman: an opera by Richard Wagner
