= Julius Günther =

Swedish singer and conductor

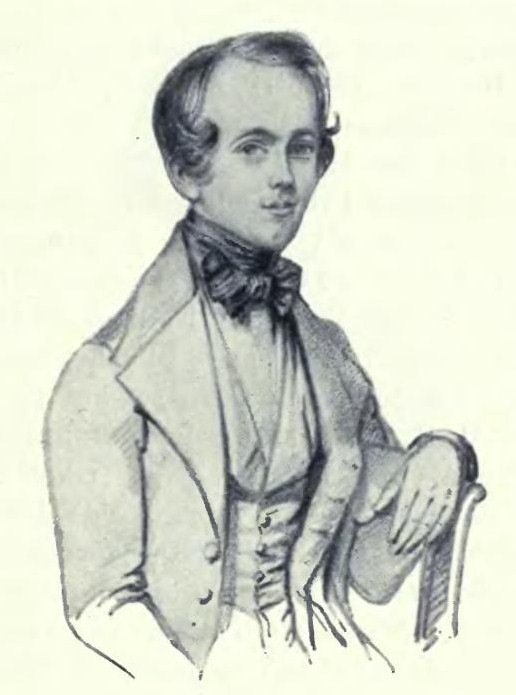
Julius Günther, after a drawing by Maria Röhl 1839. Image from Nils Personne: Svenska Teatern VIII (1927).

Julius Günther (1 March 1818 – 22 March 1904) was a Swedish opera singer, choral conductor and voice teacher in Stockholm.

== Biography ==
Julius Günther was born in Gothenburg, the son of organist Georg Günther. He began a career with the Älvsborg Regiment, but after becoming a commissioned officer, he left to pursue a career as a singer instead. He made his debut as Fra Diavolo in Fra Diavolo by Auber in 1838. Günther sang as a tenor at the Theatre Royal from 1839 to 1856, and established a career with an emphasis on French and Italian repertoire. He quickly became a popular singer because of a pleasant and reliable voice. In the early 1840s, he often sang with Swedish singer Jenny Lind, and by 1844 they became romantically linked. According to Jenny Lind's 1891 Memoir, she and Günther became engaged to marry in the spring of 1848 just before Lind returned to England. However, the two broke off the engagement in October of the same year. The existence of the engagement has been disputed.

Günther studied from 1846 to 1847 with Manuel Garcia in Paris, conducting, during that time, a brief but successful career in that city. Afterward, he returned to a position at the Royal Swedish Opera, where he sang for a further decade, though also making international appearances. From 1850 to 1862, he worked as a vocal coach, teaching the baritone and composer Fritz Arlberg, among others. Günther worked as a teacher at the Royal Conservatory of Music from 1858 to 1901 where he was appointed a professor in 1864. He also taught from 1901 to 1902 at the Opera School. He served as conductor of the New Harmonic Society from 1860 to 1878, and was elected as a member of the Royal Academy of Music in 1841. Günther died in Stockholm.
