= Josef Neruda =

Moravian organist and music teacher

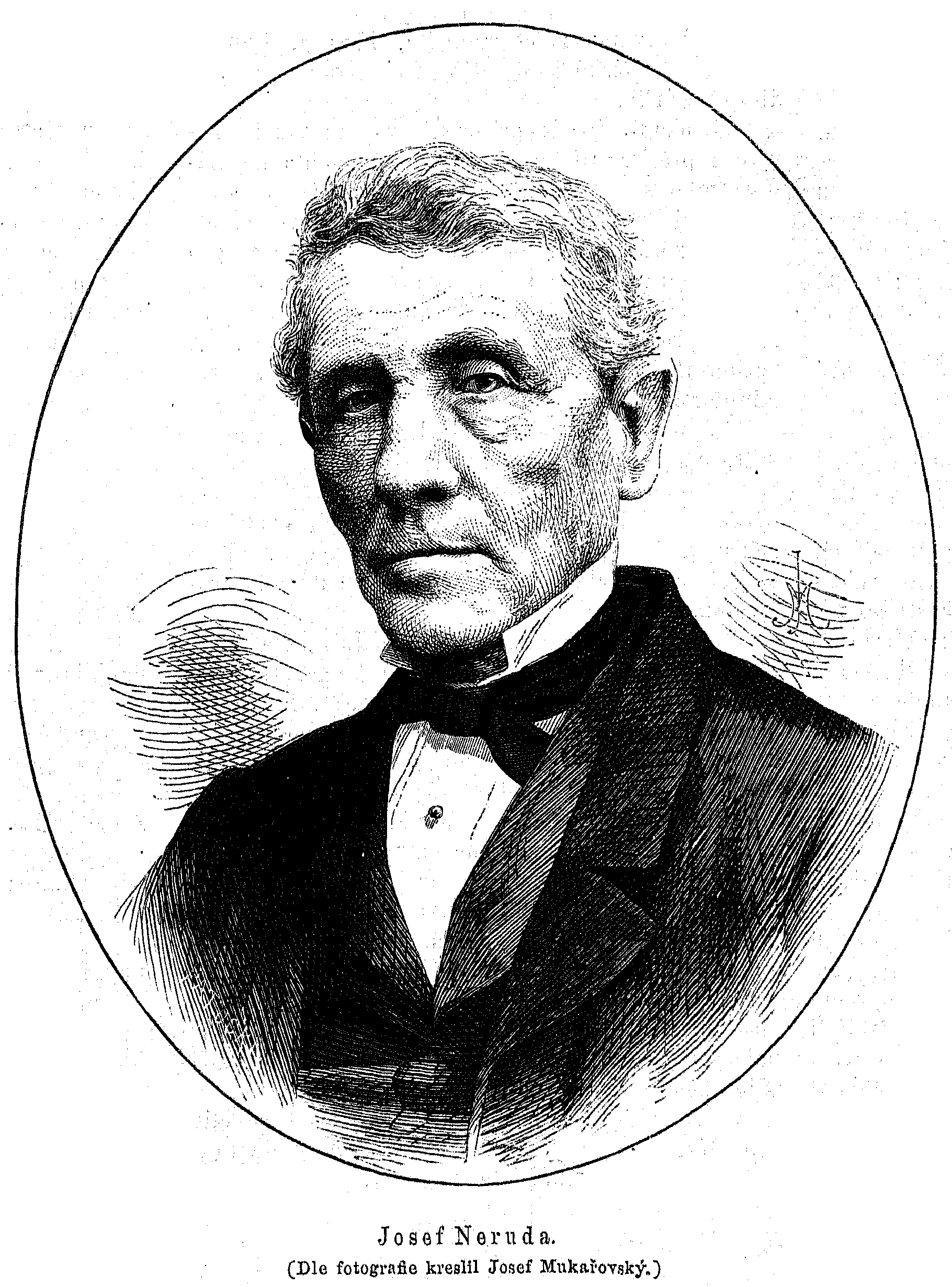
- Josef Neruda; portrait by Josef Mukařovský
- Born: January 16 1807; Mohelno
- Died: February 18 1875; Brno
- Known for: Organist and music teacher

Josef Neruda (16 January 1807, Mohelno – 18 February 1875, Brno) was a Moravian organist and music teacher. Josef was a great-grandson of the composer Johann Baptist Georg Neruda.

== Life ==
Josef Neruda learned the basics of organ playing in the Rajhrad monastery. In his youth, he was a teacher assistant in Náměšť nad Oslavou, besides this he played in Haugwitz chapel and taught piano in Olomouc. In 1832, he accepted an offer to become the minister organist in Brno. He kept this position for 36 years.

== Family ==
Josef Neruda had musically talented children. He toured all over the Europe with some of them under the name Neruda Quartet.

- Amálie Neruda (married Wickenhauser, 1834–1890), a pianist and a teacher, one of her students was Leoš Janáček
- Viktor Neruda (1836–1852), a cellist, died during the Russian concert tour in Saint Petersburg
- Wilma Neruda, Lady Hallé (1838–1911), a virtuoso violinist, married conductor Charles Hallé
- Maria Neruda (1840–1920), a violinist, married the singer and composer Fritz Arlberg
- Franz Xaver Neruda (1843–1915), a cellist who later became professor at the conservatories in Saint Petersburg and Copenhagen
- Olga Neruda (1858–1945), a pianist.
