= Maria Neruda =

Czech-Swedish violinist (1840–1920)

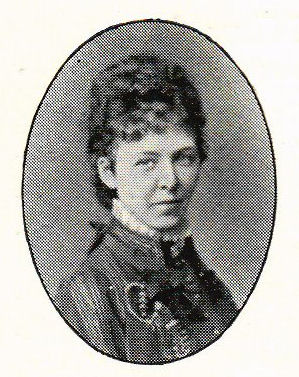
Maria Neruda

Anna Marie Rudolfina Neruda (also known as Maria Arlberg or Madame Arlberg-Neruda; 26 March 1840 – 7 November 1920) was a Czech-Swedish violinist.

== Biography ==
Born in Brno, Moravia, then part of the Austrian Empire, Neruda came from a musical family. Her grandfather was the noted Bohemian composer Johann Baptist Georg Neruda (1708–1780), and her father, Josef Neruda (1807–1875), was the organist of the cathedral of Brno. One of five children of Josef Neruda, she was the sister of the violinist Wilma Neruda and the cellist Franz Xaver Neruda.

In 1868 in Stockholm she married the opera singer Fritz Arlberg and with him had a son, the singer and actor Hjalmar Arlberg (1869–1941). She ended her career at her marriage and after made only a few appearances.

Maria Neruda died in Copenhagen in 1920.

== Career ==
She studied with her father and in 1859 joined a family group known as the Neruda Quartet, composed of various Neruda children including older sister Wilma. She performed with her siblings in, among other venues, London (1849), St. Petersburg and Stockholm (1861).

== Sources ==
- Neruda, 1. Vilhelmina (Wilma) Marie Františka in the Nordic Family Book (second edition, 1913)
- Neruda, 1. Vilhelmina in the Nordic Family Book (second edition supplement, 1925)
- Anna Maria Rudolfina Neruda-Arlberg in Adolf Lindgren and Nils Personne, Swedish Portrait Gallery (1897), volume XXI. Tone artists and scenic artists
