= Neruda (crater) =

Crater on Mercury

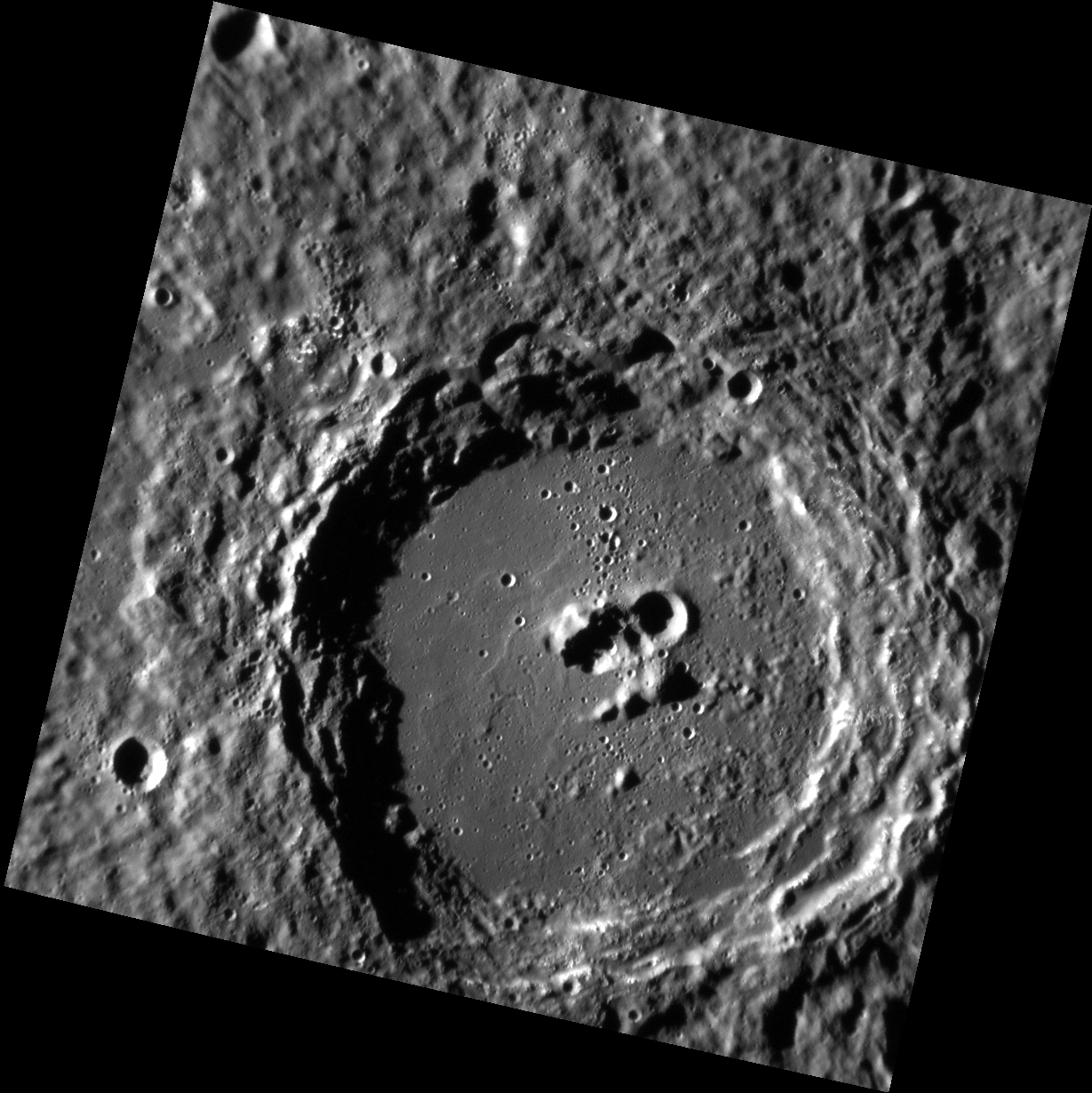
- MESSENGER image of Neruda, the namesake of the Neruda quadrangle
- Feature type: Central-peak impact crater
- Location: Neruda quadrangle, Mercury
- Coordinates: 52.6°S 234.2°W
- Diameter: 112 km (70 mi)
- Eponym: Pablo Neruda

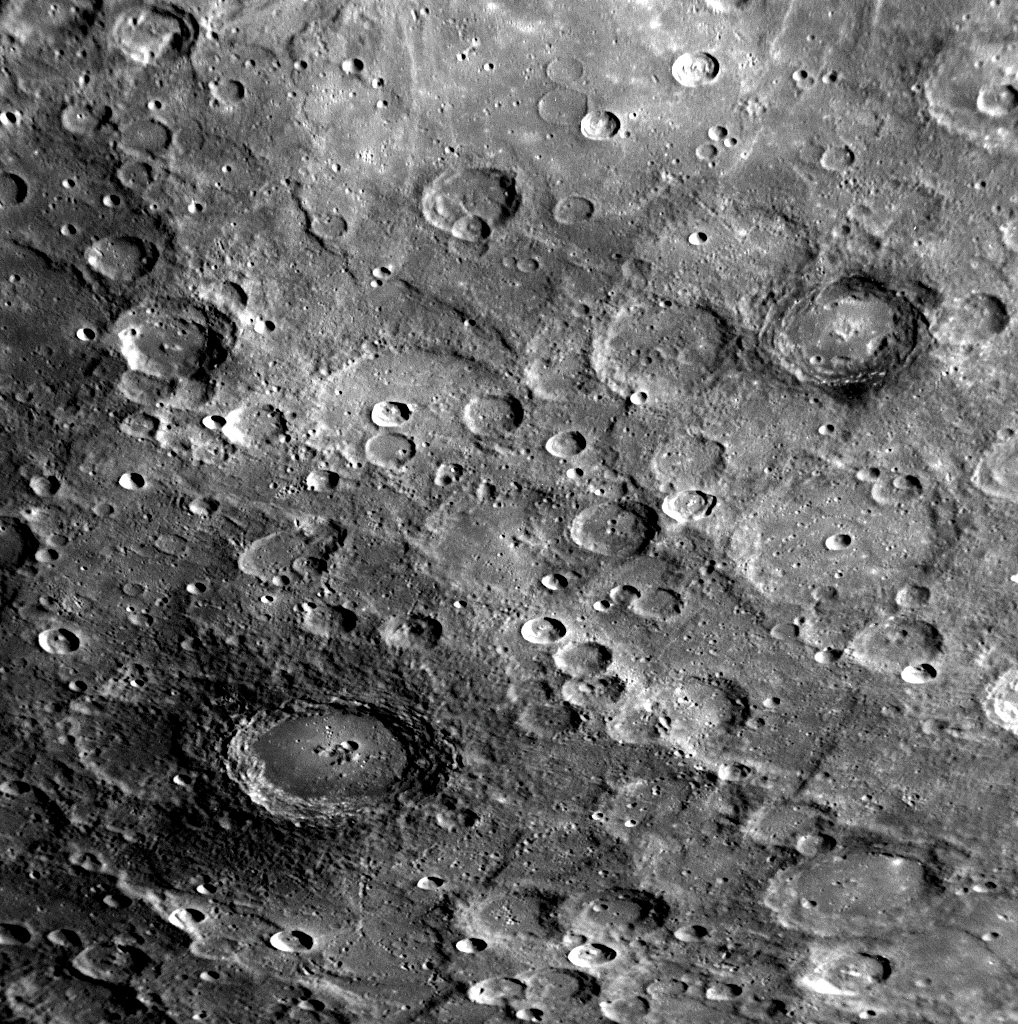
Neruda and Sher-Gil craters

Neruda is a crater on Mercury. It has a diameter of 112 kilometers. Its name was adopted by the International Astronomical Union (IAU) in 2008. Neruda was formerly named for the Chilean poet Pablo Neruda, who lived from 1904 to 1973. In 2022, in order to oppose bias in planetary naming, it was reattributed to be named for Czech poet, journalist, writer, and art critic Jan Neruda, who lived from 1834 to 1891, and Czech classical composer Johann Baptist Georg Neruda, who lived from circa 1708 to circa 1780.

To the northeast of Neruda is Sher-Gil crater. Further to the northwest are Grainger and Beckett craters.
