= Franz Xaver Neruda =

Czech-Danish cellist and composer

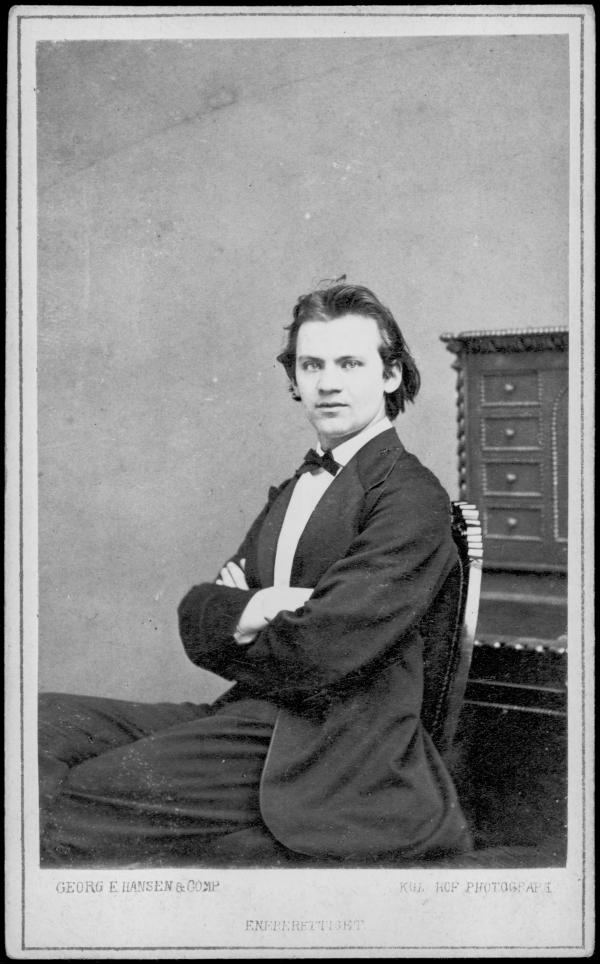
Franz Xaver Neruda

Franz Xaver Neruda (or František) (3 December 1843 – 19 March 1915) was a Czech-Danish cellist and composer of Moravian origin.

== Life ==
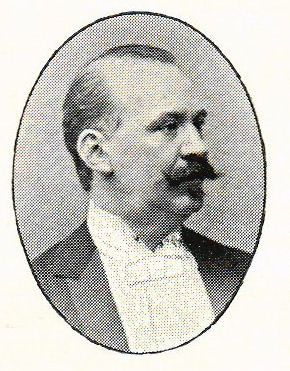
Franz Xaver Neruda in later life

Franz Xaver Neruda was born in Brno into a musical family. He was the fifth child of the organist of Brno Cathedral Josef Neruda. He grew up in Vienna and first learned violin with father (from 1852) and after the death of his brother Viktor, who played cello, he learned playing it himself. With his father and four siblings he performed through Europe in the Neruda Quartet and also as a soloist. In 1859, he studied cello for half a year with Adrien-François Servais.

Later Neruda became a member of the royal chapel in Copenhagen. On 3 December 1868, he founded there a chamber music society and the next year, he was named royal chamber musician. In 1869, he married ballet dancer Camilla Cetti. After engagements in London and Manchester, he moved back to Copenhagen until he became appointed by Anton Rubinstein as a successor of cello professor Karl Davydov at the Saint Petersburg Conservatory. In 1891, he was appointed conductor of the Stockholm music society and in 1892, conductor of the Copenhagen music society, succeeding Niels Gade and Emil Hartmann. In 1893, he was cello professor at the Copenhagen conservatory. His students there included composer Anna Schytte. After his death, Carl Nielsen succeeded him as a director of the Copenhagen music society and he composed a Prologue for recitation and orchestra In memoriam Franz Neruda.

His sister Wilma Neruda was a famous violinist while another sister Maria Neruda, also a violinist, married the singer and composer Fritz Arlberg.

== Works ==
His major works include five cello concertos, four quartets and three orchestral works. He wrote also many small pieces for piano, organ, cello, violin and some songs. The Cello Concerto No. 2 in D minor, Op. 59 has remained in the cello repertoire. Cello concertos No. 1 in E minor, Op. 57, No. 3 in A major, Op. 60 and No. 5 in G major, Op. 66 were premiered in May 2005 by cellist Beate Altenburg and Anhaltische Philharmonie Dessau under Golo Berg. The CD released on this occasion remains the only widely available recording with his works.

== See also ==
- List of Danish composers

== Other resources ==
- He has a several page entry in Kraks Blå Bog / Register 1910-1988 / (in Danish)
