= Wilma Neruda =

Czech musician (1839–1911)

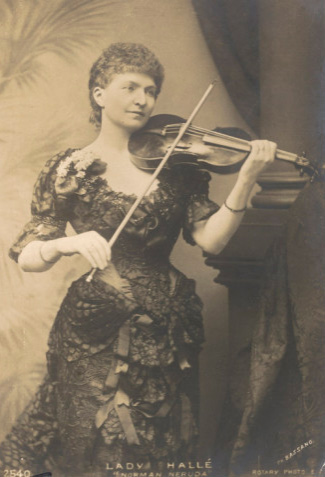
- Neruda circa 1900
- Born: 29 March 1839; Brno, Moravia, Austrian Empire
- Died: 15 April 1911 (aged 72); Berlin, Germany
- Occupations: Violinist, musician, teacher

Wilhelmine Maria Franziska Neruda (Czech: Vilemína Nerudová), also known as Wilma Norman-Neruda and Wilma, Lady Hallé, was a Czech virtuoso violinist, chamber musician, and teacher.

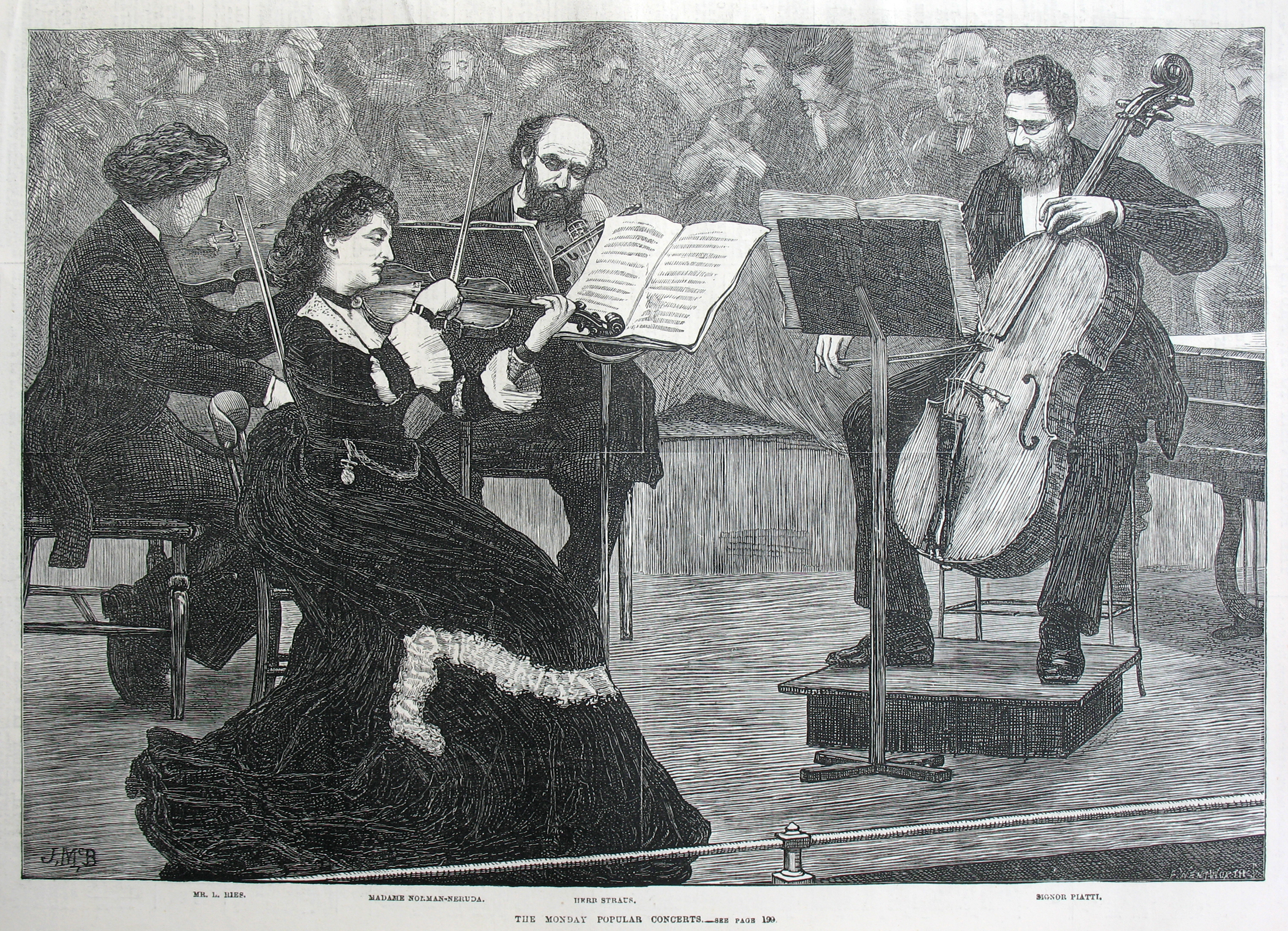
Neruda performing with the Joachim Quartet

== Life and career ==
Born in Brno (Brünn), Moravia, then part of the Austrian Empire, Neruda came from a musical family. Her great-great-grandfather was the noted Bohemian composer Johann Baptist Georg Neruda (1708–1780), and her father, Josef Neruda (1807–1875), was the organist of the cathedral of Brno. Her father taught her piano, yet she desired to play the violin. At the time, the violin was considered better suited for men, and therefore it was uncommon for women to study the violin. Josef caught his daughter playing on her older brother's violin in secret, and was so surprised at her natural ability that he allowed her to study violin instead.

Neruda, like many other influential musicians of the 19th century, was a child prodigy. Several of her siblings, including Maria Neruda and Franz Xaver Neruda, were also child prodigies in their own right, and pursued professional musical careers in adulthood. During her career as a child prodigy, Neruda's birth year was reported in different years, between 1838 and 1840. Lying about the age of a child musician wasn't uncommon; the appearance of being younger made their talents seem more impressive. Recently, Encyclopedia of Brno History reports the date of birth 29 March 1838, according to her home law document and the record in the parish registry.

The family moved to Vienna, where she studied with Leopold Jansa (1795–1875), a professor at the University of Vienna. Jansa apparently overheard Wilma playing the violin while visiting the Neruda household and insisted she study violin with him, despite her age and gender. She made her first public appearance as a solo violinist in Vienna at the age of seven, playing a violin sonata by Johann Sebastian Bach. The talented Neruda children began touring Europe performing programs of chamber music. These concerts were received with considerable enthusiasm, and audiences especially favored Wilma's technical facilities and musical maturity. Around the age of 11, Neruda made her solo debut with the London Philharmonic Orchestra, performing a violin concerto by Charles August de Bériot.

Neruda married Swedish musician Ludvig Norman (1831–1885) in Stockholm in 1864 and had two sons, Franz Ludvig and Felix Wilhelm Waldemar. Their marriage would unfortunately prove to be an unhappy one; although, as a devout Catholic, Neruda did not believe in divorce. As their relationship further deteriorated, Neruda moved to London. The remainder of their marriage would be spent apart, until Ludvig Norman's death in 1885.

Following the death of her first husband in 1885, Neruda married the German-English pianist and conductor Charles Hallé (1819–1895) in 1888. The two had met and performed together years prior on various chamber music tours, and stayed in regular correspondence. When he was knighted later in 1888, Wilma Neruda adopted the title Lady Hallé. Neruda's second marriage would be happy, but unfortunately short. Charles and Lady Hallé toured as a piano and violin duo with great success, in Europe, South Africa and Australia.

Throughout her life, Wilma Neruda was an avid chamber musician. Following some encouragement from Henri Vieuxtemps, she joined a Monday Popular Concert series in London with a string quartet, where she led from the first violin position except for when her lifelong friend Joseph Joachim was visiting and took this position. One of her regular collaborators at the concert series was the pianist Anna Mehlig who played with her chamber music by Schumann, Haydn, Rheinberger, Mendelssohn and Rubinstein.

Tragedy would strike Neruda's life at the end of the 19th century. In 1895, shortly after returning to London following a tour in South Africa with Lady Hallé, Charles Hallé died suddenly. He was internationally acclaimed, and his death was considered a great loss, especially to the British public. The British government gifted Lady Hallé a Palazzo in Asolo, Italy, where she moved to live with her son, Ludvig, who was an alpinist. Yet again, a sudden and tragic death would affect Neruda: Ludvig died in a tragic accident in 1898 while climbing in the Dolomites. Despite the loss of her second husband and son, she embarked on a tour in the United States and Canada the year following Ludvig's death in 1899 and reportedly wore black during her performances there, as a tribute to her late son.

At the age of sixty, she decided to retire from concertizing and subsequently moved to Berlin to begin a teaching career. In an interview, she revealed she had only studied with one master, Leopold Jansa, and discouraged anyone from seeking study with multiple teachers: "I thoroughly disapprove of the system of changing schools so prevalent just now. One master should only train and develop the flexible, impressionable growth of interpretation, so that the young shoots in the form of impressions may not wander adrift in the ocean of infinity."

Neruda spent the last years of her life traveling between London and Berlin. Queen Alexandra appointed her Violinist to the Queen in 1901. She died in 1911 in Berlin, aged 72.

== Legacy ==
Due to Neruda's tremendous success as an international soloist, the subsequent 20th century saw an explosion in the number of female violinists. Henri Vieuxtemps, Pablo de Sarasate, James Scott Skinner, and Niels Gade dedicated compositions to her, among other composers.

Neruda was a first-rate soloist, and her performances were met with considerable critical acclaim. While touring as a soloist in Russia, the 14-year-old Neruda performed at the same concert as a 17-year-old Henryk Wieniawski in Moscow. Neruda was given a bouquet from Henri Vieuxtemps, and the audience gave her an enthusiastic ovation. Wieniawski became jealous and attempted to come back onstage to prove he was the superior violinist, but was restrained by some individuals, including a Russian general. Wieniawski prodded the general with his bow to move out of his way, a serious affront that led to Wieniawski's immediate dismissal from Moscow. Such a disrespectful act to a high-ranking military individual could have brought a far worse punishment. Nevertheless, Neruda regularly performed works by Wieniawski throughout her career.

While Neruda owned multiple violins, she performed most regularly on a Stradivarius violin from 1709. "Lady Hallé" Stradivarius (as it is known today) was previously owned by Heinrich Wilhelm Ernst, before falling into her hands.

Joseph Joachim was a great admirer of Neruda's violin playing; in 1870 he wrote to his wife "I like her very much...Her playing is more to my taste than that of any other contemporary – unspoilt, pure and musical." He also said regarding Neruda's playing: "People will think more of her, and less of me." Joachim and Neruda performed Bach's Double Violin Concerto together at a St James' Hall Monday Popular Concert in April 1892. Both Joachim and Neruda were life-long friends, and held much respect for one another. Neruda performed at Joachim's memorial service following his death in 1907.

In A Study in Scarlet by Sir Arthur Conan Doyle, Sherlock Holmes (himself a violinist) attends a solo performance given by Neruda, where afterwards he raves about her bow control. Some sources suggest that Conan Doyle's novel was the inspiration for the pen name adopted by Chilean poet Pablo Neruda, instead of it being inspired by Czech writer Jan Neruda.

== Name changes ==
Wilma Neruda was known to the public by several different names throughout her life, including (in chronological order): Wilhelmine Maria Franziska Neruda, Wilma Neruda, Wilma Norman-Neruda, and Lady Hallé. As was common practice, most of her name changes were reflections of her marriages. She retained Norman-Neruda even after the death of her first husband, Ludvig Norman.
