= Bartered =

Bartered may refer to:

- Barter, a method of exchanging or trading by which goods or services are directly exchanged for other goods or services without using a medium of exchange
- The Bartered Bride, an 1866 comic opera by Bedřich Smetana
  - The Bartered Bride discography
- The Bartered Bride (1932 film), 1932 German film directed by Max Ophüls based on the comic opera

== See also ==
- Barter (disambiguation)
- Bride-buying
