= Josef Srb-Debrnov =

Josef Srb-Debrnov (18 September 1836 – 1 September 1904) was a Czech music historian and writer.

== Life ==
He was born Josef Srb on 18 September 1836 in the village of Debrno in Bohemia, Austrian Empire (today part of Dolany nad Vltavou, Czech Republic). He studied history and Slavic philology at the Charles-Ferdinand University in Prague and worked as a teacher, tutor, and clerk in a savings bank.

He loved music from his childhood at school in Minice, when he began to sing. In addition to his day-to-day job, he devoted himself increasingly to music, until he gave up other professions and became fully involved in organizing musical life, including as a co-founder, long-time executive (1864–1865 and 1876–1891) and key organizer of the activities of the Prague singing association Hlahol. He became a widely recognized music historian. He used the name Josef Debrnov or Josef Srb-Debrnov for his literary works. He contributed to music magazines in Bohemia and abroad, while also devoting himself to music criticism, compiled a handbook on instrumentation, wrote a History of Music in Bohemia and Moravia (1891), and created musical entries for Otto's Educational Dictionary. His extensive dictionary of Czech and foreign musical artists has survived in manuscript form.

He also turned his hand to composing, writing pieces for choirs, and for cello.

He was one of Bedřich Smetana's closest friends towards the end of the composer's life, and was also friends with Karel Bendl, Antonín Dvořák and many others. His apartment in Jircháře became the venue for the first performances of many works by contemporary composers, where he often performed as a cellist.

During his occasional visits to Prague, Bedřich Smetana lived at 12 V Jirchářích Street (the so-called house at the Three Peonies) with Srb-Debrnov, with whom he stayed twenty-six times over the course of four years. He kept scores of almost all of his works in his apartment, and he also played his first string quartet From My Life, which was first performed there with Antonín Dvořák as a violist.

During the fire at the National Theatre, he saved and then kept autographs of Smetana's operas. He also devoted himself to creating texts for musical works, both originals, especially choruses, and translations. For Smetana he translated the librettos of The Bartered Bride, The Kiss, The Two Widows; other translations included Dvořák's Vanda, Bendl's Lejla, rendered into German. He died after a long illness in Prague on 1 September 1904 and was buried in the Vyšehrad Cemetery.

== Selected works of music history ==
- Dějiny konservatoře pražské, ('History of the Prague Conservatory'), Prague, 1878
- Varhanická škola v Praze, ('Organ School in Prague'), Dalibor, vol. III, 1881, pp. 213–215
- Instrumentace: stručný návod ku poznání nástrojův hudebních s dodavkem o hudbě komorní: s notovými příklady skladatelův českých, ('Instrumentation: a brief guide to the knowledge of musical instruments with a supplement on chamber music: with musical examples by Czech composers'), Prague, 1883
- Poslední rok života B. Smetany, ('The last year of B. Smetana's life'), Dalibor, vol. VII, 1885, pp. 177-180
- Památník pražského Hlaholu, Sest. s Ferd. Tadrou, ('Memorial of Prague Glagolitic, Sest. with Ferd. Tadra'), Prague, 1886
- Dějiny hudby v Čechách a na Moravě, ('History of Music in Bohemia and Moravia'), Prague, 1891
- Z deníků Bedřicha Smetany, ('From the diaries of Bedřich Smetana'), Prague, 1902
- Slovník hudebních umělců slovanských ('Dictionary of Slavic Musicians'), manuscript, 5 volumes

== Literature ==
- Čeleda, Jaroslav (1945). Smetanův druh sděluje [Smetana's friend tells: the life and work of Josef Srba-Debrnov] (in Czech). Prague: Ed. Menšl. p. 230.
