= Dolany nad Vltavou =

- Municipality
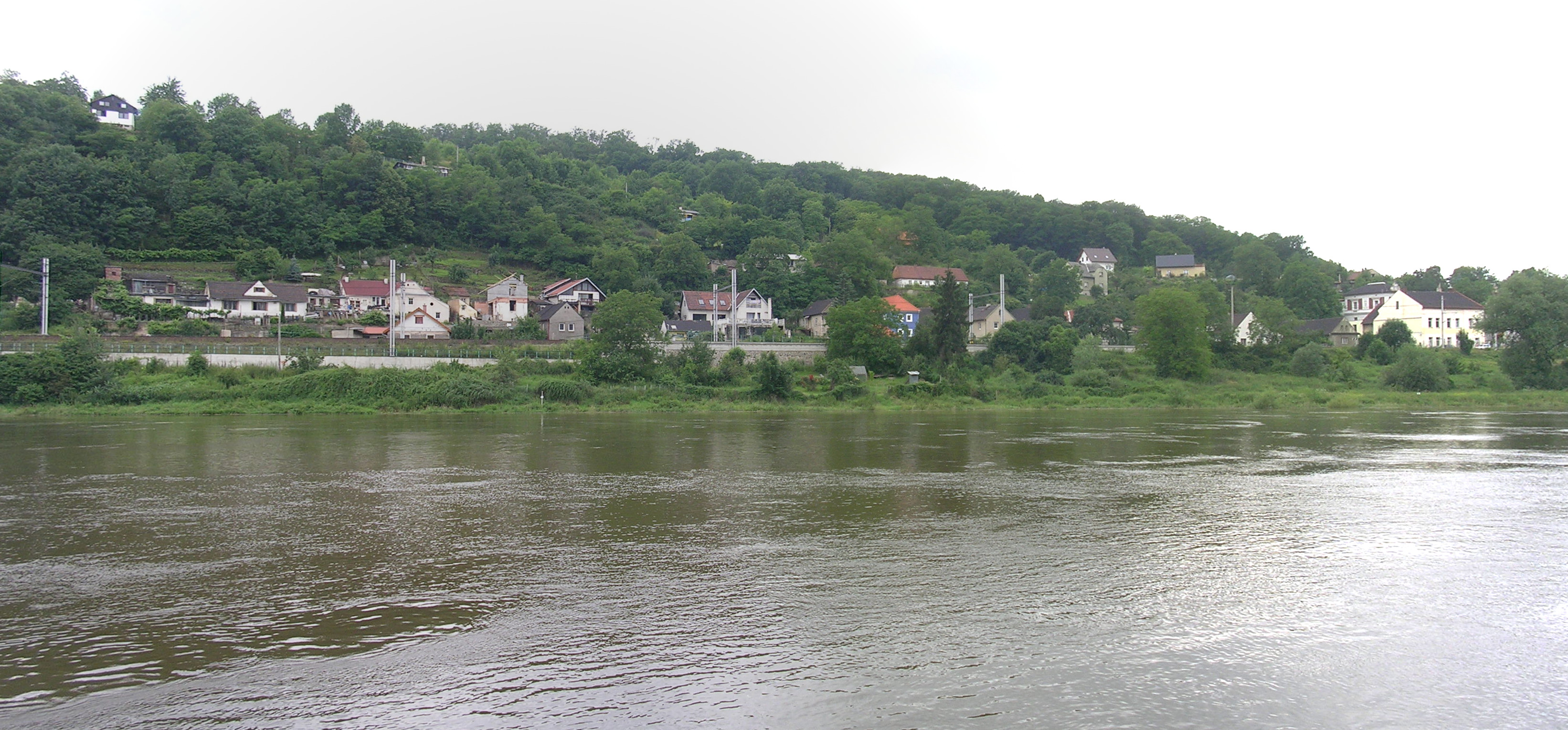
- Look over the Vltava

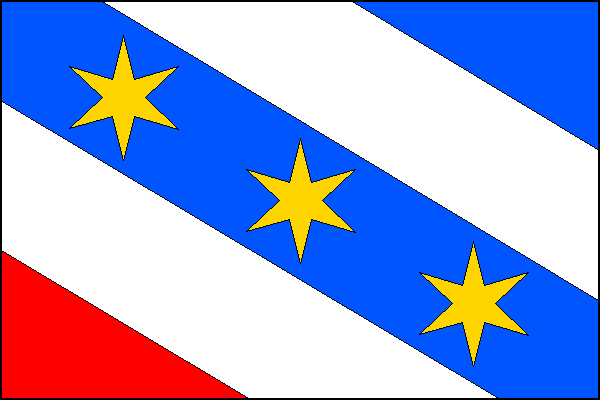
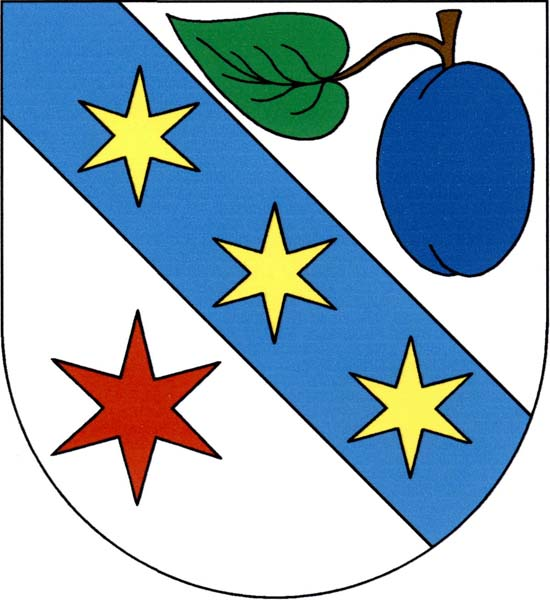
- Flag Coat of arms

- Location in the Czech Republic
- Coordinates: 50°13′20″N 14°20′59″E
- Country: Czech Republic
- Region: Central Bohemian
- District: Mělník
- First mentioned: 1318

Area
  - Total: 5.50 km^{2} (2.12 sq mi)
- Elevation: 192 m (630 ft)

Population (2026-01-01)
  - Total: 939
  - Density: 171/km^{2} (442/sq mi)
- Time zone: UTC+1 (CET)
  - Summer (DST): UTC+2 (CEST)
- Postal code: 278 01
- Website: www.dolany.cz

Dolany nad Vltavou (until 2016 Dolany) is a municipality and village in Mělník District in the Central Bohemian Region of the Czech Republic. It has about 900 inhabitants.

== Administrative division ==
Dolany nad Vltavou consists of two municipal parts (in brackets population according to the 2021 census):

- Dolany nad Vltavou (860)
- Debrno (73)

== Etymology ==
The name Dolany is derived from the Czech word důl (in Old Czech written as dól), i.e. 'valley'. In 2016, the municipality changed its name to Dolany nad Vltavou ('Dolany upon the Vltava').

== Geography ==
Dolany nad Vltavou is located about 17 kilometres (11 mi) southeast of Mělník and 13 km (8 mi) north of Prague. It lies in the Prague Plateau. The municipality is situated on the left bank of the Vltava River, in the place where the rocky valley of the Vltava ends and begins a plain typical for the confluence of the rivers Vltava and Elbe. The highest point of the municipality is at 273 m (896 ft) above sea level.

== History ==
The first written mention of Dolany is from 1318. Debrno was first mentioned in 1437.

== Demographics ==
Historical population

| Year | Pop. | ±% |
|---|---|---|
| 1869 | 582 | — |
| 1880 | 606 | +4.1% |
| 1890 | 648 | +6.9% |
| 1900 | 742 | +14.5% |
| 1910 | 728 | −1.9% |

| Year | Pop. | ±% |
|---|---|---|
| 1921 | 809 | +11.1% |
| 1930 | 920 | +13.7% |
| 1950 | 855 | −7.1% |
| 1961 | 830 | −2.9% |
| 1970 | 780 | −6.0% |

| Year | Pop. | ±% |
|---|---|---|
| 1980 | 718 | −7.9% |
| 1991 | 646 | −10.0% |
| 2001 | 685 | +6.0% |
| 2011 | 838 | +22.3% |
| 2021 | 933 | +11.3% |

Source: Censuses

== Transport ==
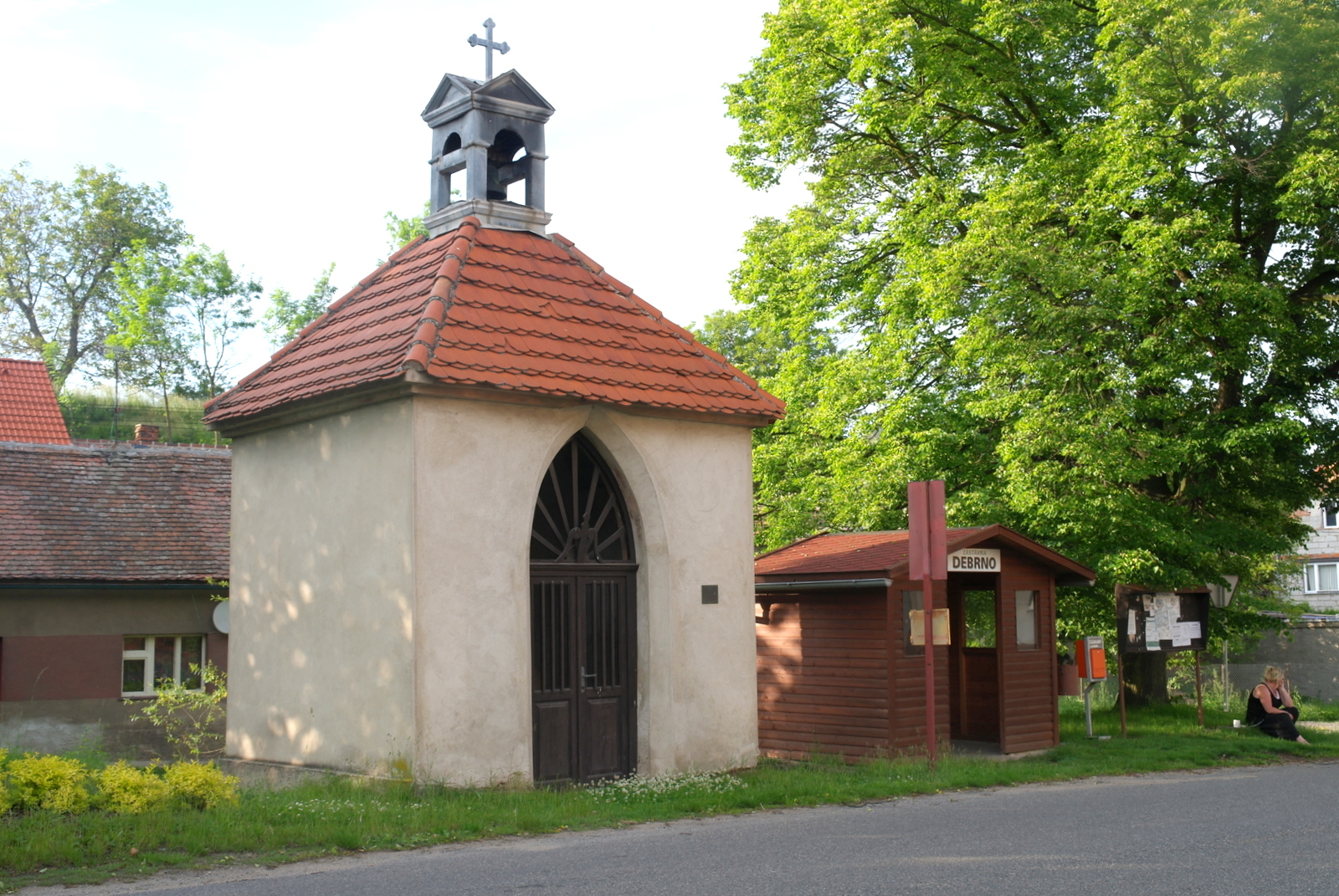
Centre of Debrno

Dolany nad Vltavou is located on the railway line Prague–Ústí nad Labem.

== Sights ==
The historic centre of the village of Debrno is well preserved and protected as a village monument zone. There are homesteads from the end of the 18th and beginning of the 19th century, with modifications from the turn of the 19th and 20th centuries.

== Notable people ==
- Josef Srb-Debrnov (1836–1904), music historian and writer
