= Barter (disambiguation) =

Barter may refer to:

== Business ==
- Barter, a type of trade, either between individuals or organizations, using goods and services rather than money.

== Music ==
- Barter 6, by Young Thug, 2015

== People ==
- Barter (surname)

== Places ==
- Barter Island in Alaska
