= Lejla (opera) =

Lejla is an 1868 Czech-language opera by Karel Bendl.

== Recordings ==
- "Ó ještě čekat...V líbezném klínu" (from Lejla) Ivan Kusnjer (baritone)
