= Karel Bendl =

Czech composer (1838–1897)

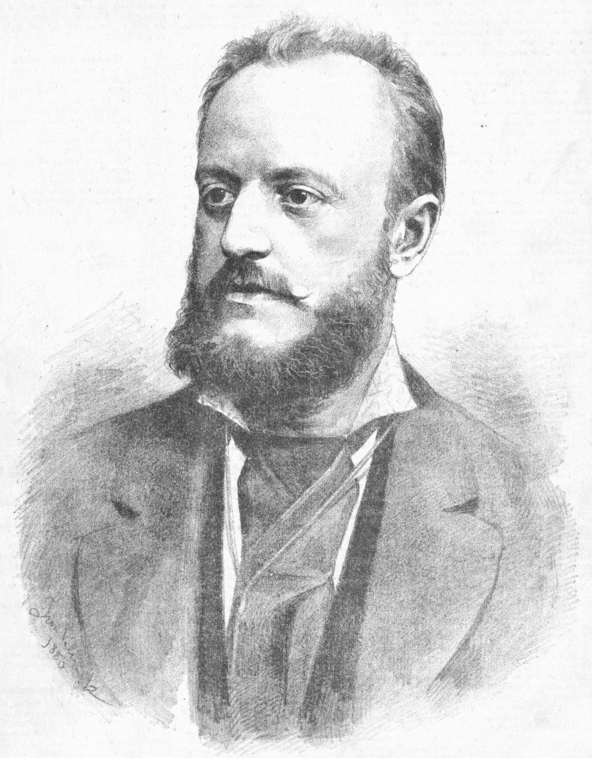
- Portrait of Karel Bendl by Jan Vilímek
- Born: 1838-04-16
- Died: 1897-09-20
- Other names: Podskalský
- Occupations: Composer, Conductor

Karel Bendl, or German: Karl Bendl, pseudonym: Podskalský (16 April 1838, Prague, Bohemia, Austrian Empire – 20 September 1897, Prague) was a Czech composer.

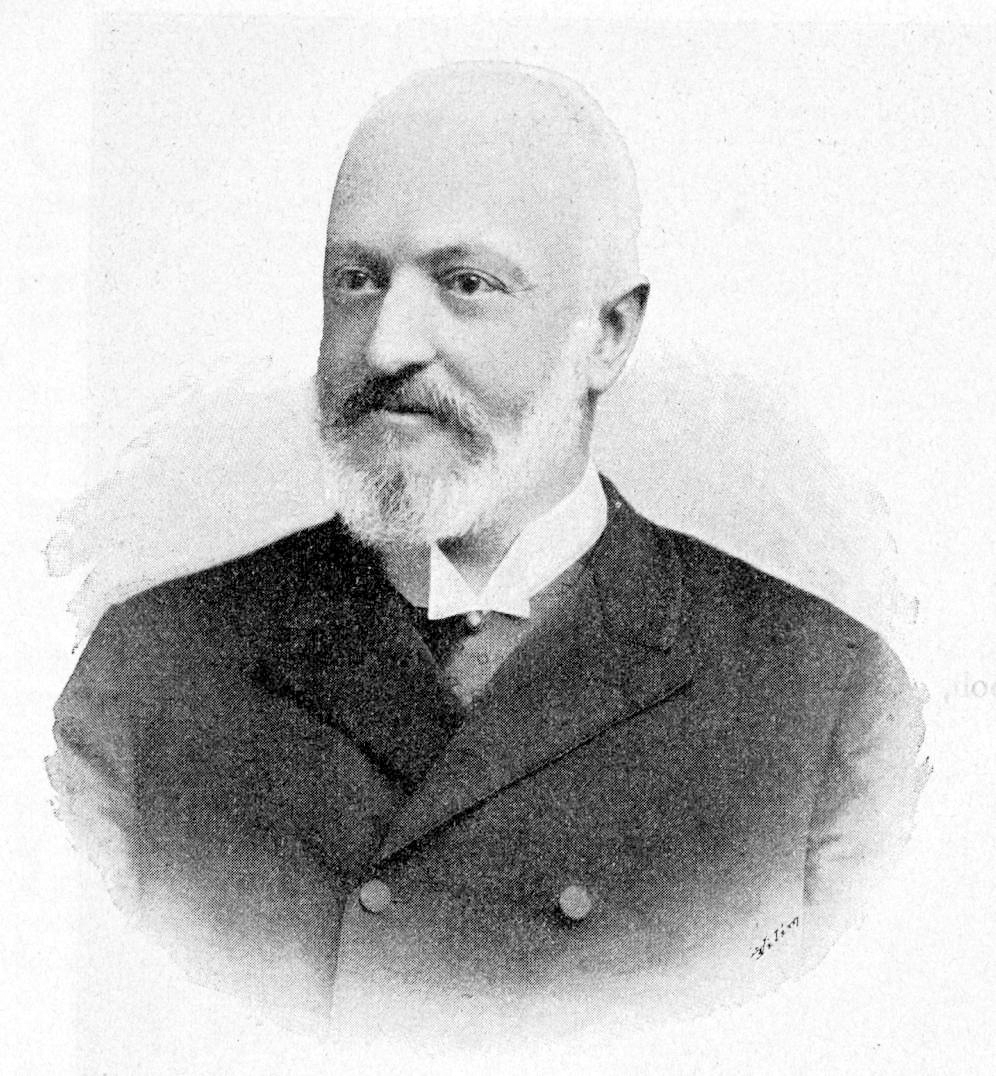
(1897)

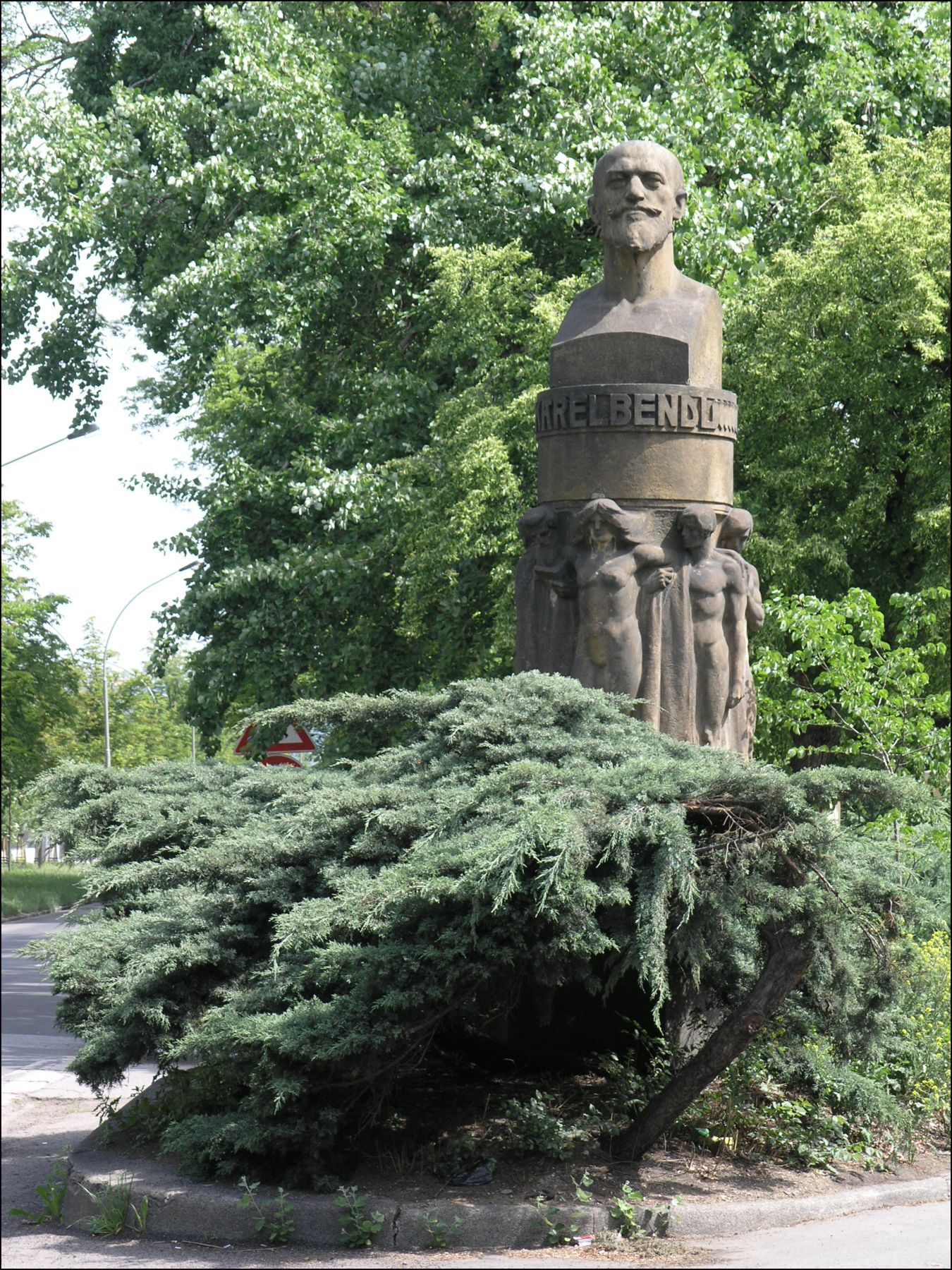
A monument in Bubeneč, work by Stanislav Sucharda

== Life ==
Bendl was born and died in Prague. He studied at the organ school, where he met and befriended Antonín Dvořák one year before graduating with honors in 1858. By then he had already composed a number of small choral works. In 1861 his Poletuje holubice won a prize and at once became a favorite with the local choral societies. In 1864, Bendl went to Brussels, where for a short time he held the post of second conductor of the opera. In Paris, he became influenced by the stage works of Charles Gounod and Ambroise Thomas and especially by Giacomo Meyerbeer.

By 1865, he was back in Prague where he was appointed conductor of the choral society known as Hlahol, and he held the post until 1879, when Russian Baron Dervies (originally from Hamburg), includes Baron Pavel (Grigor'evič) fon Derwies (von der Wiese, Dervies, Dervíz) engaged his services for his private band.

Bendl's first opera Lejla was successfully produced in 1868. It was followed by Břetislav a Jitka (1870), Starý ženich, a comic opera (1883), Karel Škréta (1883), Dítě Tábora, a prize opera (1892), and Máti Míla (1891). Other operas by Bendl are Indická princezna, Černohorci, a prize opera, and the two operas Čarovný květ and Gina. His ballad Švanda dudák acquired much popularity; he published a mass in D minor for male voices and another mass for a mixed choir; two songs to "Ave Maria"; a violin sonata and a string quartet Op.119 in F Major; and a quantity of songs and choruses, many of which have come to be regarded as national possessions of Bohemia.
