= The Bartered Bride discography =

This list is a discography of The Bartered Bride (Czech: Prodaná nevěsta; German: Die verkaufte Braut) by Bedřich Smetana. The opera was first performed, in its original two-act format, at the Provisional Theatre, Prague, on 30 May 1866. After substantial revisions it was premiered in its extended three-act form at the Provisional Theatre on 25 September 1870.

The first complete recording of the opera was issued in 1933. Numerous recordings have since been made, in the original Czech language, in German and in English. The list includes both studio recordings and live performances, but not excerpts or highlights. "Year" refers to the year of the original recording; in the case of reissues, the Label and Catalogue No. generally relate to the most recent CD version. Unless stated otherwise, the language is Czech.

== Audio recordings ==
Year	Cast (Mařenka, Jeník, Vašek, Kecal)	Conductor, Opera house and orchestra	Label
1933	Ada Nordenová; Vladimír Tomš; Jaroslav Gleich; Emil Pollert	Otakar Ostrčil; Prague National Theatre orchestra and chorus	His Master's Voice; Cat: 8.110098-99
1937	Hilda Burke; Mario Chamlee; George Rasely; Louis D'Angelo	Wilfrid Pelletier; Metropolitan Opera orchestra and chorus (sung in English)	Bensar; Cat: OL 5837
1939	Hilde Konetzni; Richard Tauber; Heinrich Tessmer; Fritz Krenn	Thomas Beecham; London Philharmonic Orchestra; Royal Opera House chorus (sung in German)	Urania; Cat: URN22286
1947	Ludmila Červinková; Beno Blachut; Rudolf Vonásek; Karel Kalaš	Karel Ančerl; Prague Radio Symphony Orchestra; Prague Radio Chorus	Opera d'Oro; Cat: OPD1354
1949	Elisabeta Shumilova; Georgi Nelepp; Anatole Orfenov; Nicolai Shchelgolkov	Kiril Kondrashin; Bolshoi Theatre orchestra and chorus (sung in Russian)	Concert Hall; Cat: CHS1318
1951	Traute Richter; Sebastian Hauser; Ralf Peters; Kurt Böhme	Hans Lenzer; Städische Oper Berlin orchestra and chorus (sung in German)	VOX OPX; Cat:148/1-2
1952	Milada Musilová; Ivo Žídek; Oldřich Kovář; Karel Kalaš	Jaroslav Vogel; Prague National Theatre orchestra and chorus	Supraphon; Cat: SU 3980-2
1953	Elfride Trötschel; Richard Hol; Willi Hofmann; Georg Stern	Karl Elmendorff des Hessichen Rundfunks orchestra and chorus (sung in German)	Cantus Classics; Cat: 500675
1954	Elfride Trötschel; Kurt Wolinsky; Willy Müller; Heinz Rehfuss	Walter Goehr; Frankfurter Opernhaus orchestra and chorus (sung in German)	Gala; Cat: GL100810
1955	Erna Berger; Rudolf Schock; Hanns-Heinz Nissen; Gottlob Frick	Wilhelm Schüchter; Nordwestdeutsche Philharmonie; Chor des Landestheater Hannover (sung in German)	EMI Classics; Cat: 7243 5 74270 2 9
1956	Vilma Bukovec; Miro Brajnik; Janez Lipušček; Ladko Korošec	Dimitrij Žebre; Slovenian National Opera orchestra and chorus	Philips; Cat: ABL3179-81
1959	Drahomira Tikalová; Ivo Žídek; Oldřich Kovář; Eduard Haken	Zdeněk Chalabala; Prague National Theatre orchestra and chorus	Supraphon; Cat: SU0040-2612
1962	Pilar Lorengar; Fritz Wunderlich; Karl-Ernst Mercker; Gottlob Frick	Rudolf Kempe; Bamberger Symphoniker; RIAS Kammerchor (sung in German)	EMI Classics; Cat: 81872
	Anny Schlemm; Rolf Apeck; Harald Neukirch; Theo Adam	Otmar Suitner; Dresdner Staatsoper orchestra and chorus (sung in German)	Berlin Classics; Cat: 0020402
1975	Teresa Stratas; René Kollo; Heinz Zednik; Walter Berry	Jaroslav Krombholc; Münchner Rundfunkorchester; Chor des Bayerischen Rundfunks (sung in German)	RCA Red Seal; Cat: 74321-40576
1978	Teresa Stratas; Nicolai Gedda; Jon Vickers; Martti Talvela	James Levine; Metropolitan Opera orchestra and chorus (sung in English)	Bensar; Cat: OL12278
1982	Gabriela Beňačková; Peter Dvorský; Miroslav Kopp; Richard Novák	Zdeněk Košler; Czech Philharmonic & chorus	Supraphon; Cat: SU3703-2
1999	Oksana Krovytska; Miroslav Dvorský; John Cogram; Jiří Sulženko	Zdeněk Mácal; Opéra de Nancy orchestra and chorus	Celestial Audio; Cat: CA003
2004	Susan Gritton; Paul Charles Clarke; Timothy Robinson; Peter Rose	Charles Mackerras; Philharmonia Orchestra; Royal Opera House chorus (sung in English)	Chandos; Cat: CHAN3128
2008	Christiane Oelze; Aleš Briscein; Christoph Homberger; Franz Hawlata	Jiří Bělohlávek; L'Opéra National de Paris orchestra and chorus	Premiere Opera; Cat: CDNO3162-2

== Video recordings ==
Year	Cast (Mařenka, Jeník, Vašek, Kecal)	Conductor, Opera house and orchestra	Label
1932	Jarmila Novotná; Willi Domgraf-Fassbaender; Paul Kemp; Otto Wernicke	Theo Mackeben; Unknown (sung in German)	VHS: Bel Canto Society; Cat: 671
1957	Elsie Morison; Victor Franklin; Raymond Macdonald; Keith Nelson	Clive Douglas; Victoria Symphony Orchestra; Melbourne Singers (sung in English)	DVD: Premiere Opera; Cat: 6241
1978	Teresa Stratas; Nicolai Gedda; Jon Vickers; Martti Talvela	James Levine; Metropolitan Opera orchestra and chorus (sung in English)	DVD: The Met; Cat: 811357013342
1982	Gabriela Beňačková; Peter Dvorský; Miroslav Kapp; Richard Novák	Zdeněk Košler; Czech Philharmonic orchestra and chorus	DVD: Supraphon; Cat: 7011-9
1982	Lucia Popp; Siegfried Jerusalem; Heinz Zednik; Karl Ridderbusch	Ádám Fischer; Vienna State Opera orchestra and chorus (sung in German)	DVD: Deutsche Grammophon; Cat: 001005109
1998	Soile Isokoski; Jorma Silvasti; Ian Bostridge; Franz Hawlata	Bernard Haitink; Royal Opera House orchestra and chorus	DVD: Royal Opera; Cat: 438
