= Hřiměždice =

- Municipality
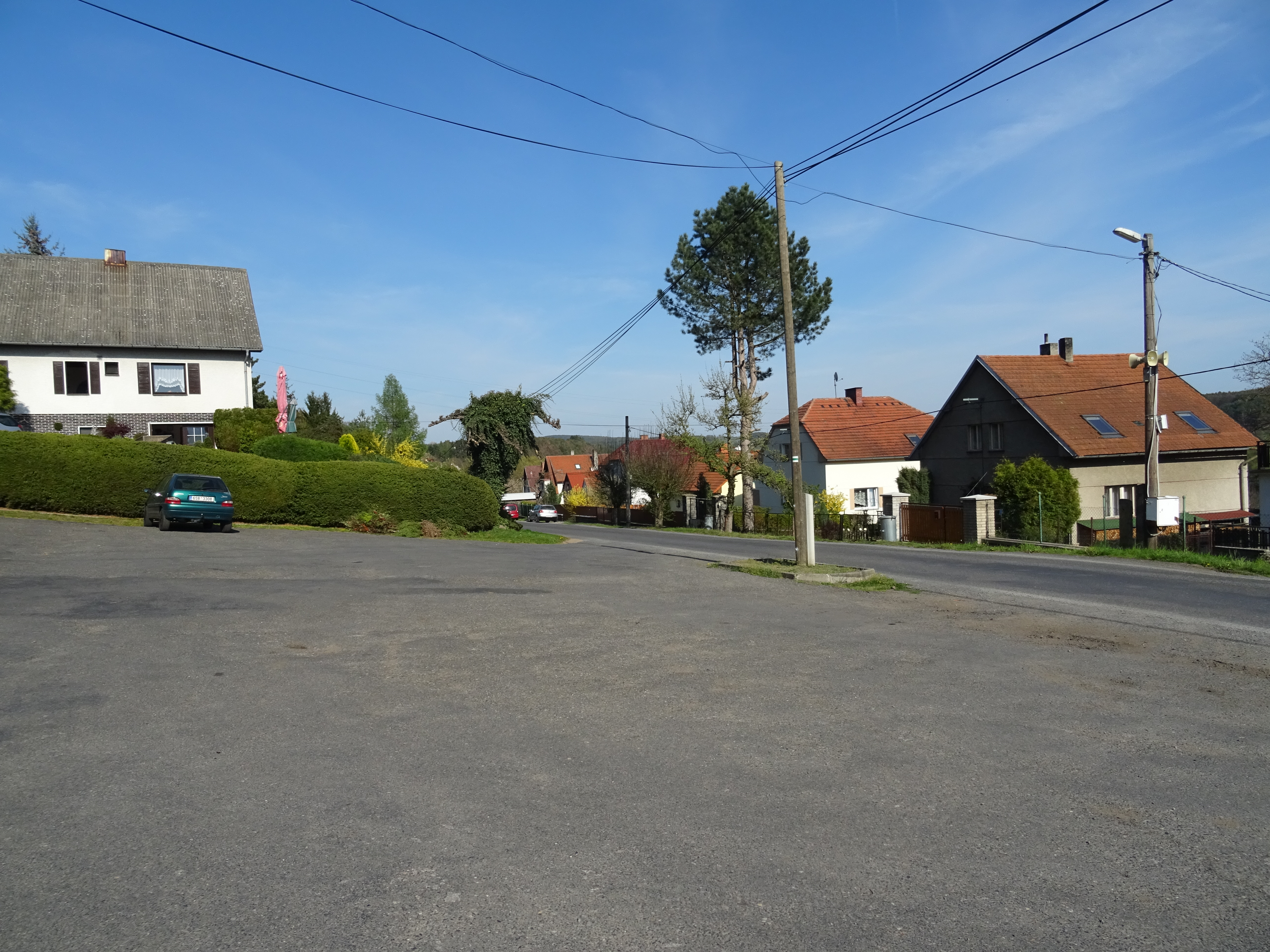
- Vestec, a part of Hřiměždice

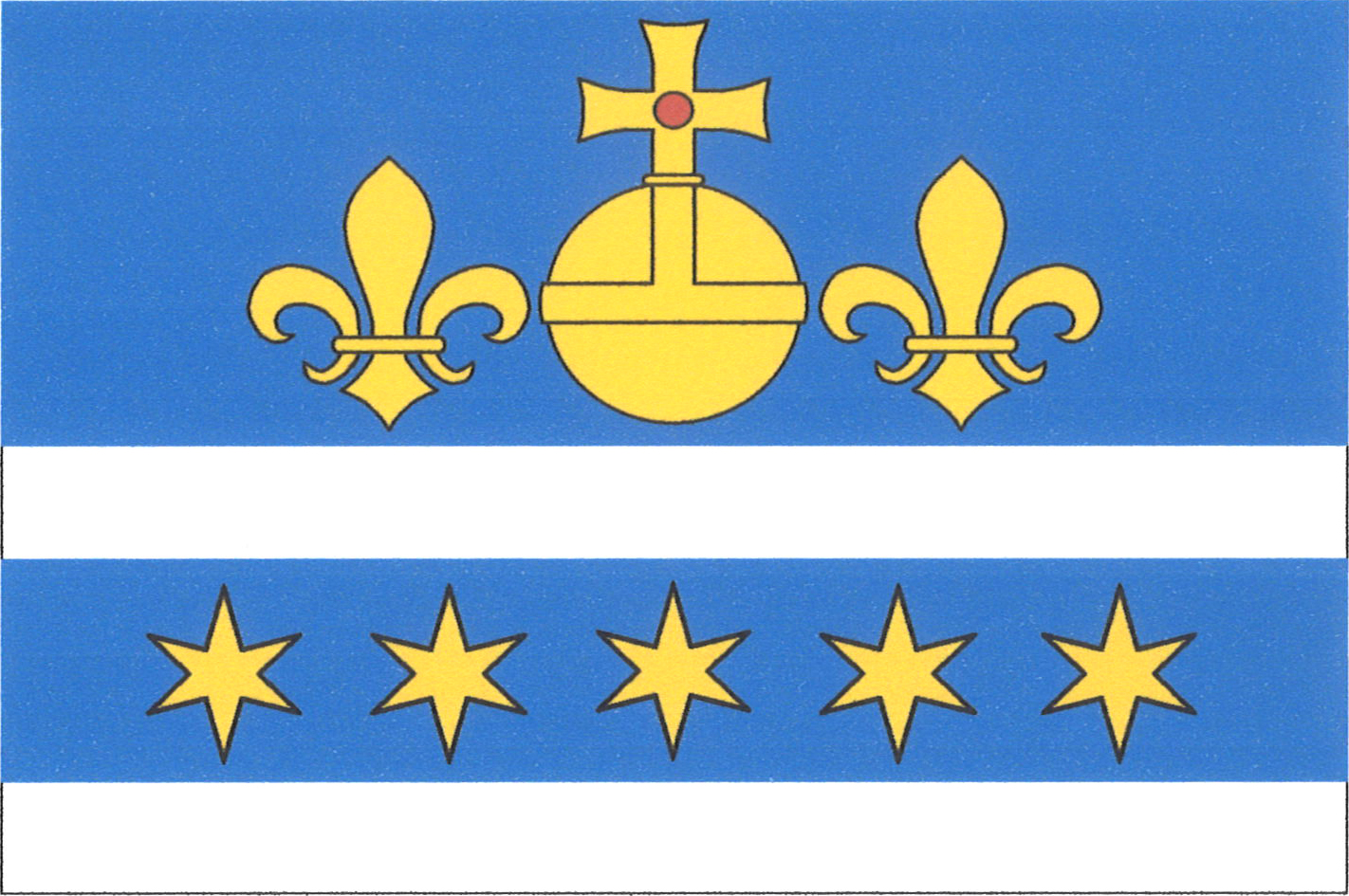
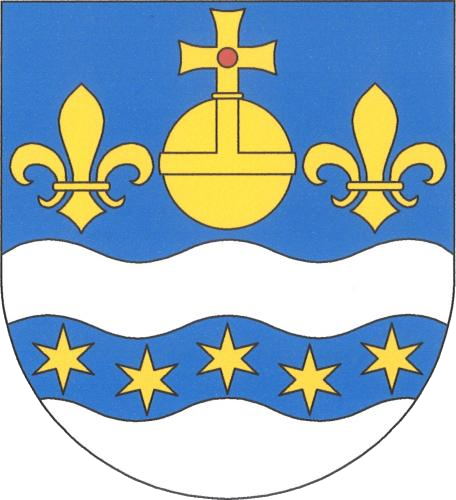
- Flag Coat of arms

- Location in the Czech Republic
- Coordinates: 49°41′13″N 14°16′30″E
- Country: Czech Republic
- Region: Central Bohemian
- District: Příbram
- First mentioned: 1270

Area
  - Total: 8.51 km^{2} (3.29 sq mi)
- Elevation: 325 m (1,066 ft)

Population (2026-01-01)
  - Total: 423
  - Density: 49.7/km^{2} (129/sq mi)
- Time zone: UTC+1 (CET)
  - Summer (DST): UTC+2 (CEST)
- Postal codes: 262 14, 263 01
- Website: www.hrimezdice.cz

Hřiměždice is a municipality and village in Příbram District in the Central Bohemian Region of the Czech Republic. It has about 400 inhabitants. It lies on the shore of Slapy Reservoir in the Benešov Uplands. Hřiměždice is known for an annual extreme water jumping competition called High Jump in which people jump from a cliff at a flooded quarry.

== Administrative division ==
Hřiměždice consists of three municipal parts (in brackets population according to the 2021 census):

- Hřiměždice (304)
- Háje (33)
- Vestec (55)

== Etymology ==
The initial name of Hřiměždice was Hrměždice. It was derived from the surname Hrměžď, meaning "the village of Hrměžď's people". The old Czech word hrměžď (hlemýžď in modern Czech), from which the surname was derived, meant 'snail'.

== Geography ==
Hřiměždice is located about 19 kilometres (12 mi) east of Příbram and 38 km (24 mi) south of Prague. It lies in the Benešov Uplands. The highest point is the hill Na Hvězdáři at 452 m (1,483 ft) above sea level. The municipality is situated on the shore of Slapy Reservoir, built on the Vltava River.

== History ==
The first written mention of Hřiměždice is from 1270. Until 1270, the village was owned by the Břevnov Monastery, then King Ottokar II merged it with the Kamýk estate. In the 15th and 16th centuries, Hřiměždice belonged to the Hluboká estate. Jan Vojkovský of Milhostice bought Hřiměždice in 1569 and annexed it to the Zduchovice estate. During the 17th century, the Wratislaw of Mitrovice family and the Strahov Monastery were among the owners of the estate. At the beginning of the 18th century, knight Adam of Mateřov bought Hřimeždice from the monastery and made it the centre of his small estate.

== Demographics ==
Historical population

Year	Pop.	±%
1869	742	—
1880	699	−5.8%
1890	724	+3.6%
1900	702	−3.0%
1910	691	−1.6%

Year	Pop.	±%
1921	632	−8.5%
1930	658	+4.1%
1950	493	−25.1%
1961	498	+1.0%
1970	461	−7.4%

Year	Pop.	±%
1980	411	−10.8%
1991	362	−11.9%
2001	379	+4.7%
2011	417	+10.0%
2021	392	−6.0%

Source: Censuses

== Transport ==
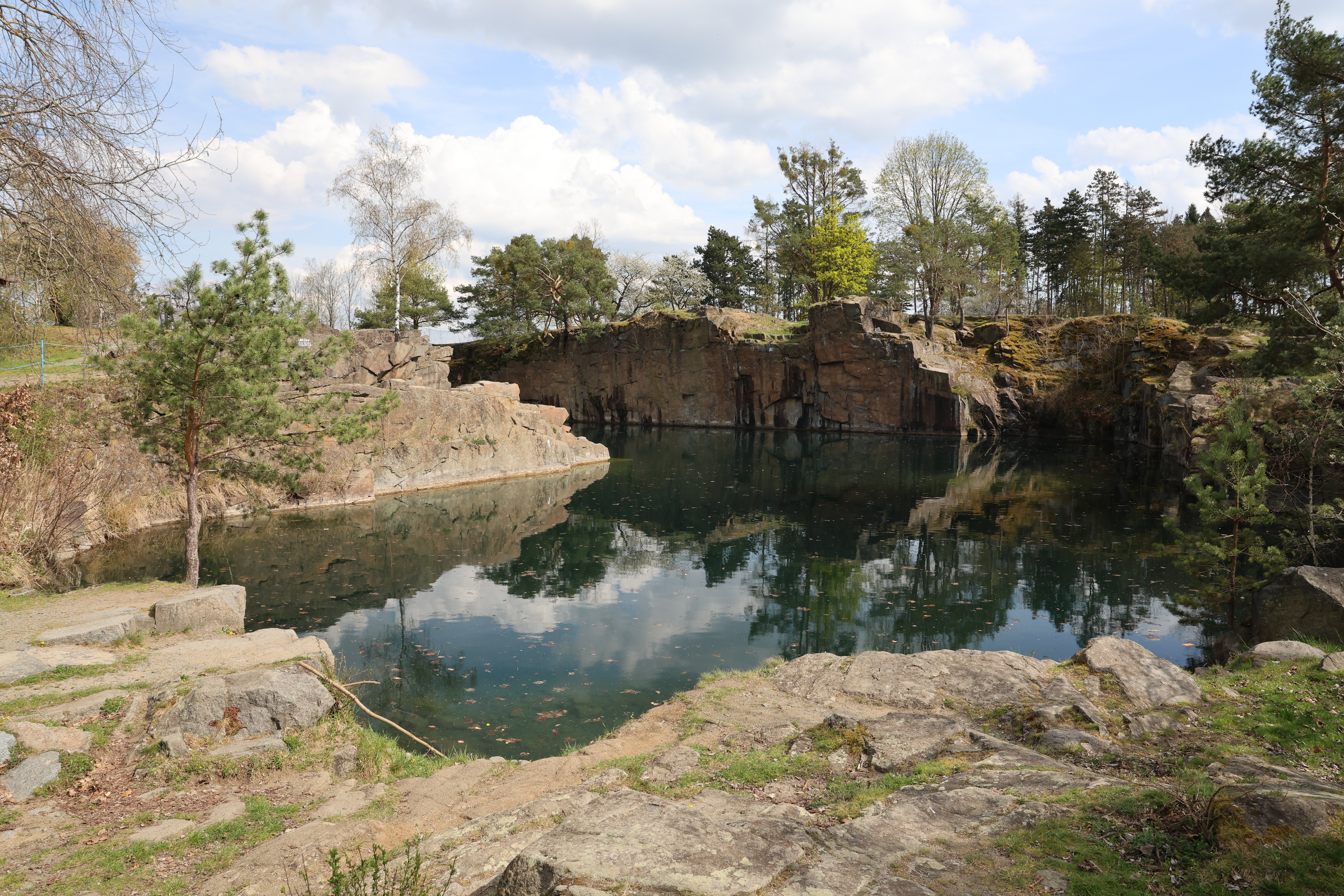
Kujalův lom

The I/18 road (the section from Příbram to Sedlčany) runs through the municipality.

== Sport ==
Hřiměždice is known for Kujalův lom, a flooded quarry after granite mining. It is used for recreation. The extreme water jumping competition called High Jump is held there every year.

== Sights ==
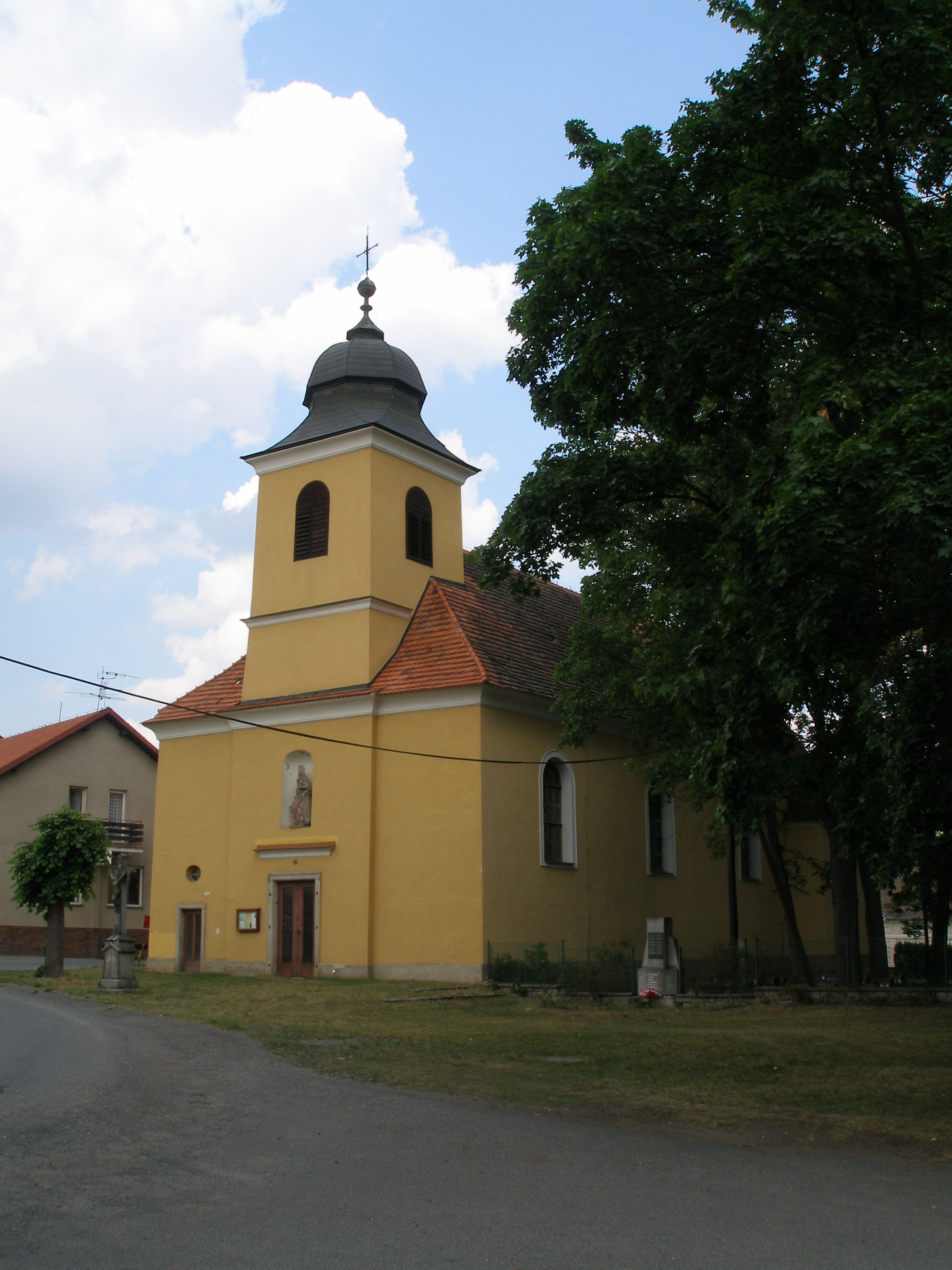
Church of Saint Anne

The main landmarks of Hřiměždice are the castle and the church. The Church of Saint Anne was originally a chapel from around 1700, which was extended into the church in 1797. It is a simple late Baroque building.

The Hřiměždice Castle was first documented in 1788. It is a small one-story castle in the Baroque and Neoclassical styles. The castle used to have a tower, which was removed during the reconstruction in 1945.
