= Drhovy =

- Municipality
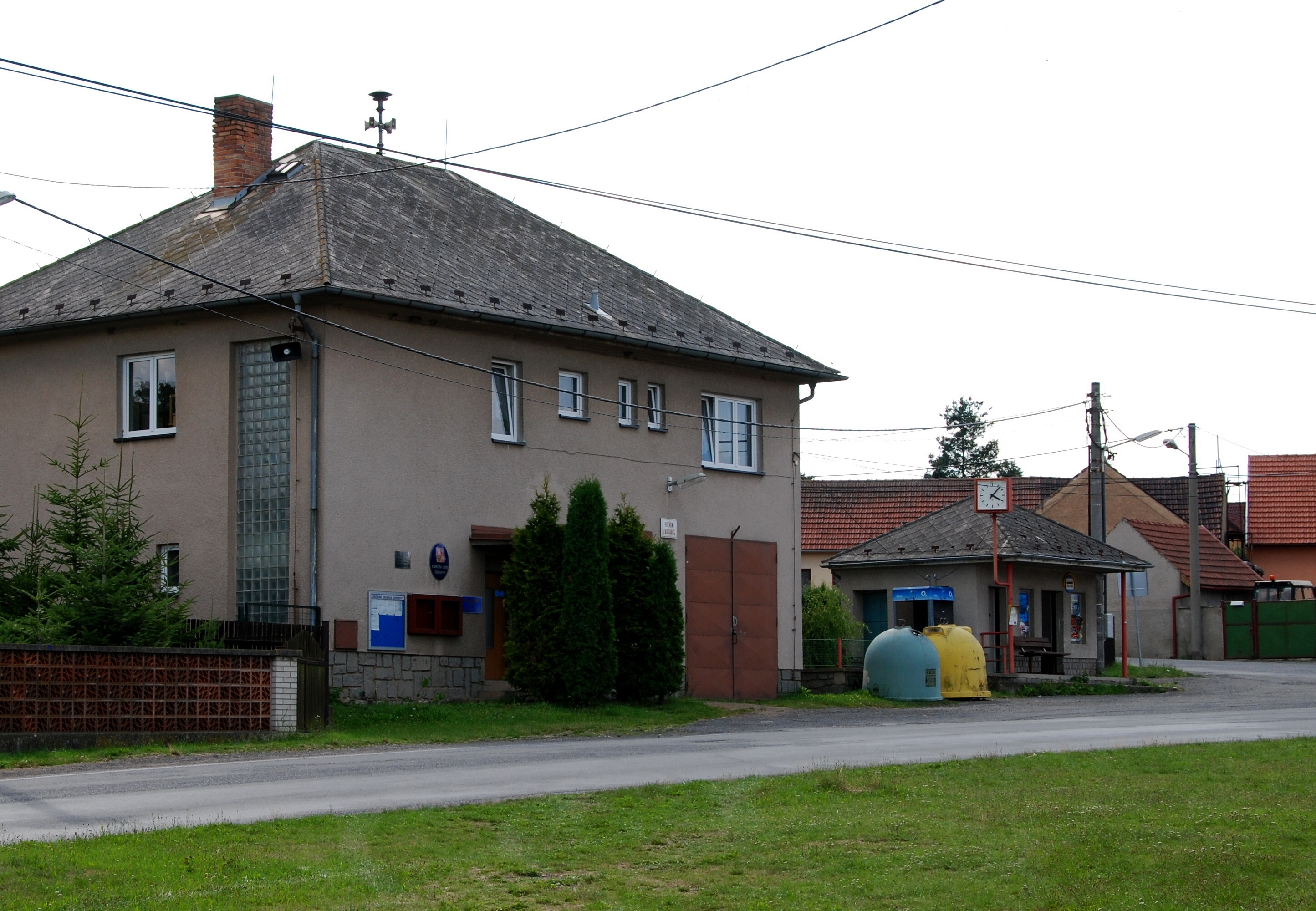
- Municipal office

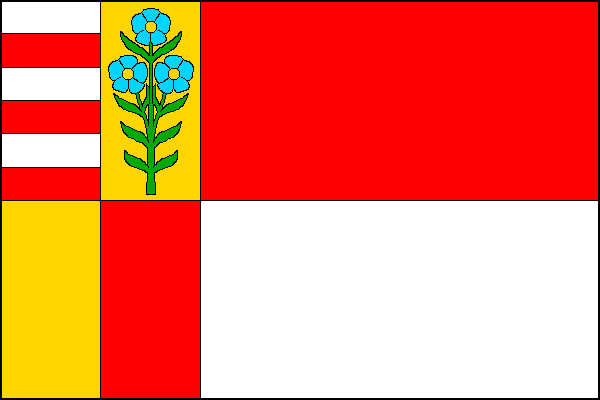
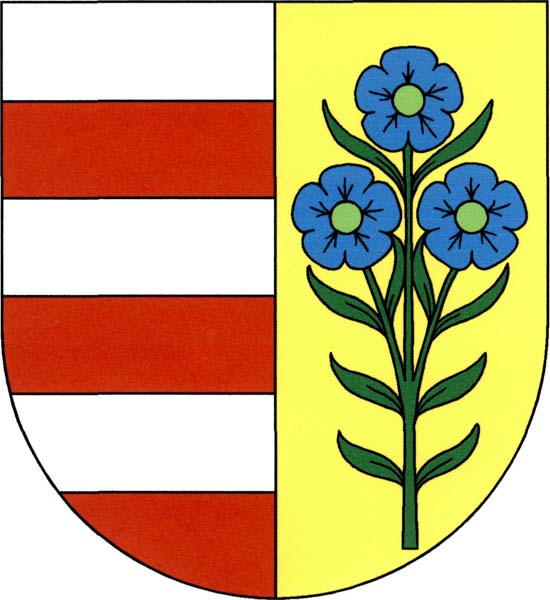
- Flag Coat of arms

- Location in the Czech Republic
- Coordinates: 49°44′21″N 14°13′57″E
- Country: Czech Republic
- Region: Central Bohemian
- District: Příbram
- First mentioned: 1653

Area
  - Total: 6.36 km^{2} (2.46 sq mi)
- Elevation: 410 m (1,350 ft)

Population (2026-01-01)
  - Total: 314
  - Density: 49.4/km^{2} (128/sq mi)
- Time zone: UTC+1 (CET)
  - Summer (DST): UTC+2 (CEST)
- Postal code: 263 01
- Website: www.drhovy.cz

Drhovy is a municipality and village in Příbram District in the Central Bohemian Region of the Czech Republic. It has about 300 inhabitants.

== Administrative division ==
Drhovy consists of two municipal parts (in brackets population according to the 2021 census):

- Drhovy (223)
- Homole (43)

== Etymology ==
The name is derived from the surname Drha.

== Geography ==
Drhovy is located about 17 kilometres (11 mi) east of Příbram and 35 km (22 mi) southwest of Prague. It lies in the Benešov Uplands. The highest point is the hill Libický vrch at 465 m (1,526 ft) above sea level. The brook Drhovský potok flows through the municipality and supplies the fishpond Drhovský rybník, located next to the built-up area.

== History ==
The first written mention of Drhovy is from 1653.

== Demographics ==
Historical population

Year	Pop.	±%
1869	318	—
1880	334	+5.0%
1890	358	+7.2%
1900	330	−7.8%
1910	341	+3.3%

Year	Pop.	±%
1921	358	+5.0%
1930	329	−8.1%
1950	245	−25.5%
1961	217	−11.4%
1970	200	−7.8%

Year	Pop.	±%
1980	198	−1.0%
1991	211	+6.6%
2001	239	+13.3%
2011	253	+5.9%
2021	266	+5.1%

Source: Censuses

== Transport ==
There are no railways or major roads passing through the municipality.

== Sights ==
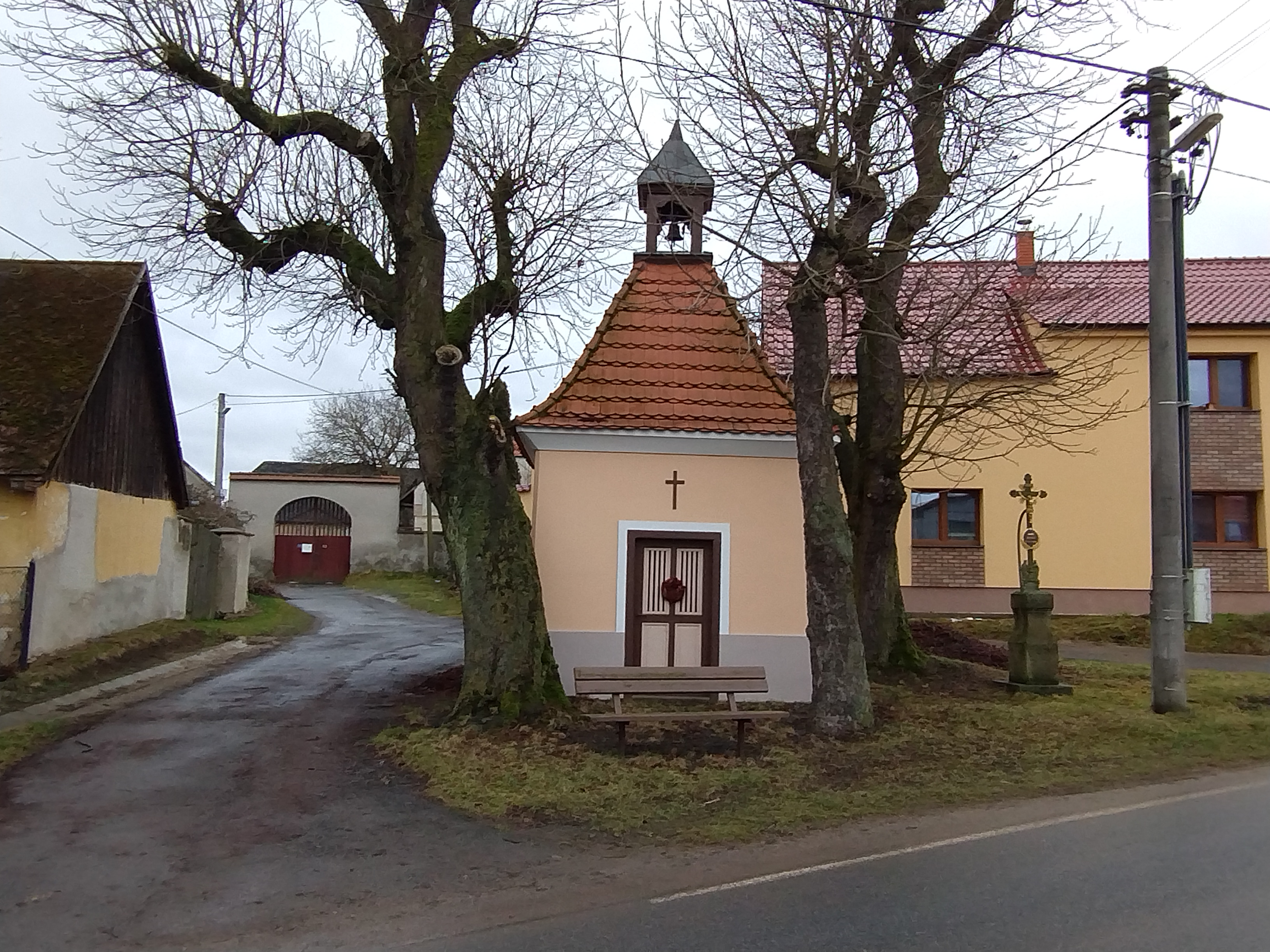
Chapel of Saint Peter

The only protected cultural monument in the municipality is the wooden rural house No. 7. It was probably built at the turn of the 18th and 19th centuries. It is a preserved example of regional folk architecture.

A cultural landmark in the centre of Drhovy is the Chapel of Saint Peter.
