= St John's Rapids (opera) =

Svatojanské proudy ("St John's Rapids") also called Vltavská víla ("The vila of the Vltava") is an opera by Josef Richard Rozkošný to a libretto by Eduard Rüffer.

It was first performed, conducted by Bedřich Smetana, in 1871. It was performed another six times at the Národní divadlo in 1885, and thirty five times in total.

== Roles ==
- Čeněk, Count of Libočany - baritone
- Bořita, a woodsman - bass
- Julie, his daughter - soprano
- Horymír, a miner - tenor
- Vltavka, a vila (fairy) of the Vltava - soprano
- Slavoš, a hunter - bass
- Lidka, friend of Julie - soprano

== Recordings ==
- The 1st Act scene of Čeněk, Julie, her father and chorus was recorded for Czech radio in 1987 and released on a recital CD by Ivan Kusnjer in 2011.
