= Teplýšovice =

- Municipality
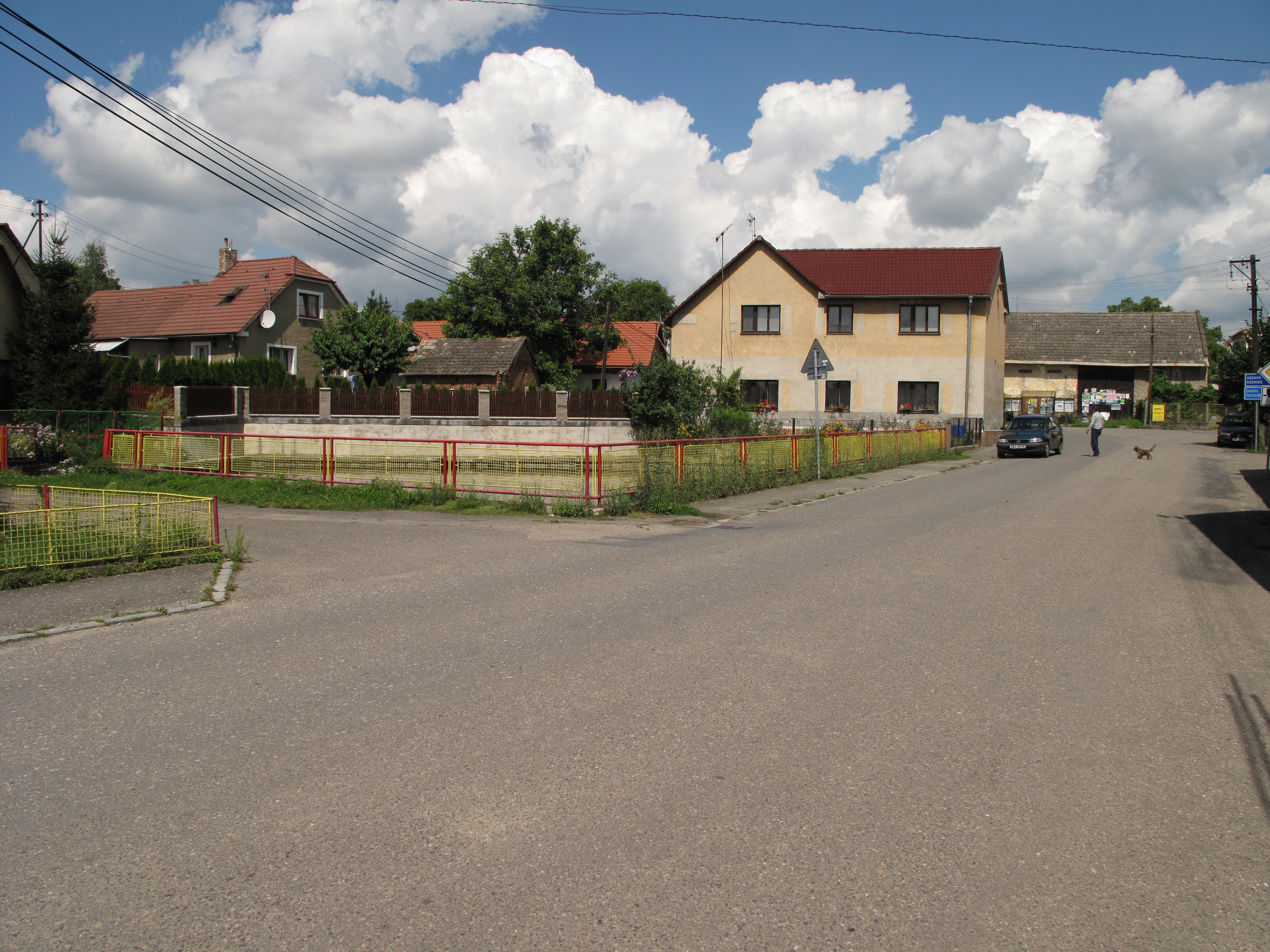
- Centre of Teplýšovice

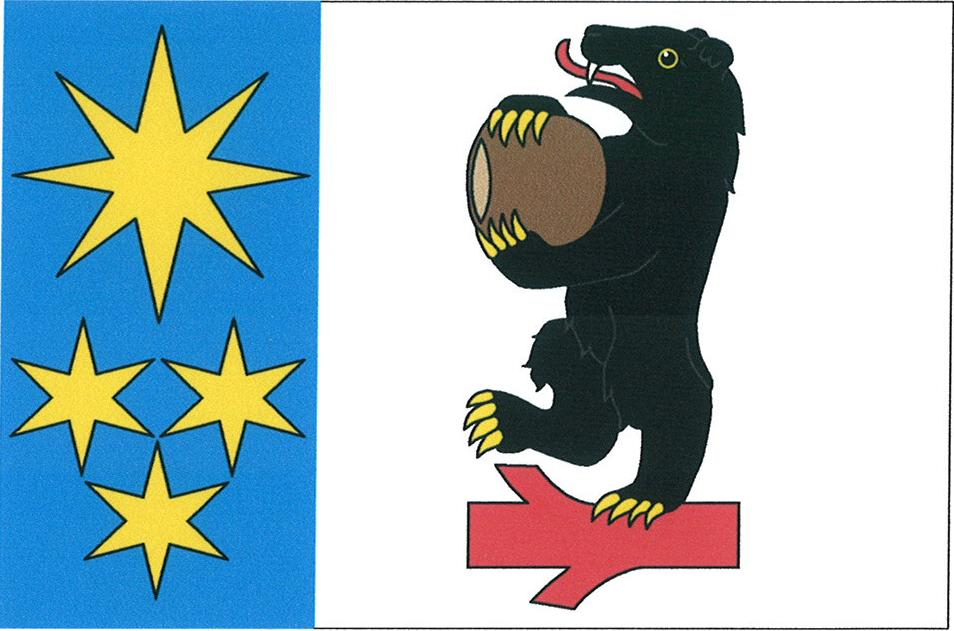
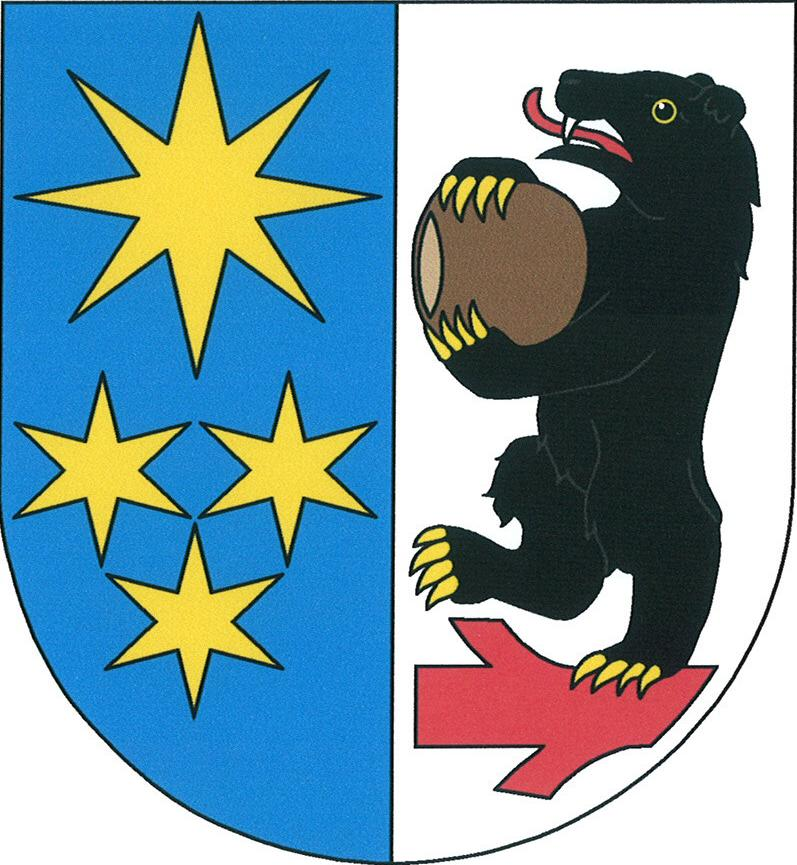
- Flag Coat of arms

- Location in the Czech Republic
- Coordinates: 49°48′22″N 14°48′6″E
- Country: Czech Republic
- Region: Central Bohemian
- District: Benešov
- First mentioned: 1352

Area
  - Total: 10.57 km^{2} (4.08 sq mi)
- Elevation: 463 m (1,519 ft)

Population (2026-01-01)
  - Total: 554
  - Density: 52.4/km^{2} (136/sq mi)
- Time zone: UTC+1 (CET)
  - Summer (DST): UTC+2 (CEST)
- Postal codes: 256 01
- Website: www.chopos.cz/teplysovice-titulni-strana.html

Teplýšovice is a municipality and village in Benešov District in the Central Bohemian Region of the Czech Republic. It has about 600 inhabitants.

== Administrative division ==
Teplýšovice consists of five municipal parts (in brackets population according to the 2021 census):

- Teplýšovice (308)
- Čeňovice (119)
- Humenec (34)
- Kochánov (37)
- Zálesí (6)

== Etymology ==
The name is derived from the personal name Teplýš, meaning "the village of Teplýš's people".

== Geography ==
Teplýšovice is located about 8 kilometres (5 mi) east of Benešov and 34 km (21 mi) southeast of Prague. It lies in the Benešov Uplands. The highest point is at 517 m (1,696 ft) above sea level. The area is rich in small fishponds.

== History ==
The first written mention of Teplýšovice is from 1352.

== Demographics ==
Historical population

| Year | Pop. | ±% |
|---|---|---|
| 1869 | 804 | — |
| 1880 | 861 | +7.1% |
| 1890 | 821 | −4.6% |
| 1900 | 774 | −5.7% |
| 1910 | 751 | −3.0% |

| Year | Pop. | ±% |
|---|---|---|
| 1921 | 696 | −7.3% |
| 1930 | 633 | −9.1% |
| 1950 | 471 | −25.6% |
| 1961 | 494 | +4.9% |
| 1970 | 431 | −12.8% |

| Year | Pop. | ±% |
|---|---|---|
| 1980 | 416 | −3.5% |
| 1991 | 397 | −4.6% |
| 2001 | 382 | −3.8% |
| 2011 | 441 | +15.4% |
| 2021 | 504 | +14.3% |

Source: Censuses

== Transport ==
There are no railways or major roads passing through the municipality.

== Sights ==
The main landmark of Teplýšovice is the Church of Saint Gall. It was built in the Baroque style in 1726.
