= Josef Richard Rozkošný =

Czech composer and pianist (1833–1913)

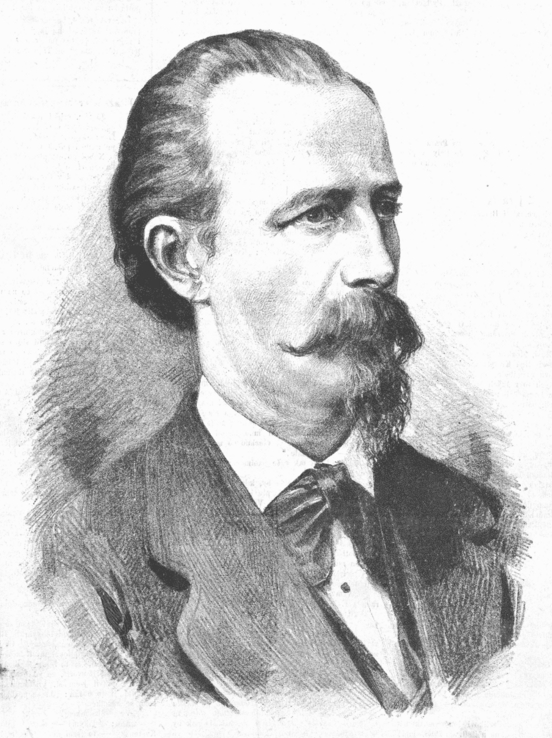
Josef Richard Rozkošný

Josef Richard Rozkošný (21 September 1833 – 3 June 1913) was a Czech composer and pianist.

== Life ==
Rozkošný was born on 21 September 1833 in Prague. He studied at a gymnasium, but he also took piano lessons and later studied composition privately with Jan Bedřich Kittl. Although his main occupation was as a bank clerk, he also devoted his entire life to music. From 1869 to 1875, he was the choirmaster of the Lumír singing association in Prague. In 1871–1873 and 1883–1889, he was the chairman of the music department of Umělecká beseda. He also edited the music magazine Hudební listy. In 1897, he was elected a member of the Czech Academy of Sciences and Arts. Towards the end of his life, he served on the committee of the Prague Conservatory. He died on 3 June 1913 in Prague.

He is buried at the Olšany Cemetery in Prague.

== Works ==
=== Operas ===
- Ave Maria, libretto by V. Trappl; unperformed, lost (1855 or 1856)
- Mikuláš ('Saint Nicholas') 1870
- St John's Rapids (Czech: Svatojanské proudy) (about the St John's Rapids on the Vltava), also called Vltavská víla (The Spirit of the Vltava) 1871
- Záviš z Falkenštejna (about Záviš of Falkenstein, 1250–1290) 1877
- Mladí pytláci (The Young Poachers) 1877, libretto by Jindřich Hanuš Böhm, unperformed, lost
- Alchymista ('The Alchemist') 1880, libretto also by Böhm, also unperformed, lost
- Popelka ('Cinderella') 1885
- Krakonoš 1889
- Stoja 1894
- Satanela, also Satanella 1898
- Černé jezero ('Black Lake') also Šumavská víla ('The Spirit of the Bohemian Forest') 1906
- Rusalka (unfinished)

== Selected recordings ==
- Svatojanské proudy, scene from act 1 in Czech, Ivan Kusnjer as the count, 1987 for Czech Radio Plzeň; conductor Vít Micka
