= Kamýk nad Vltavou =

- Municipality
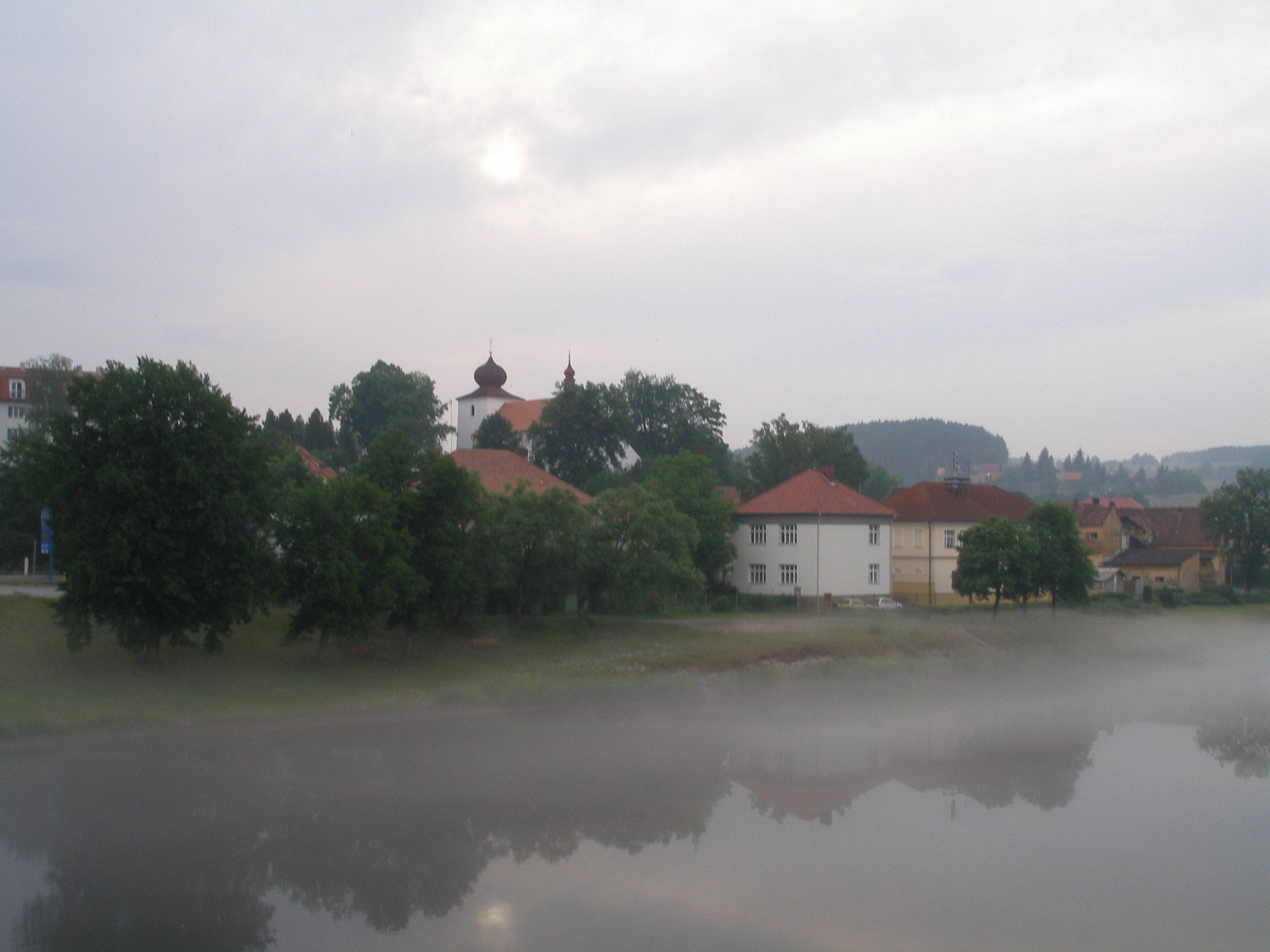
- Left bank of the Vltava River in Kamýk

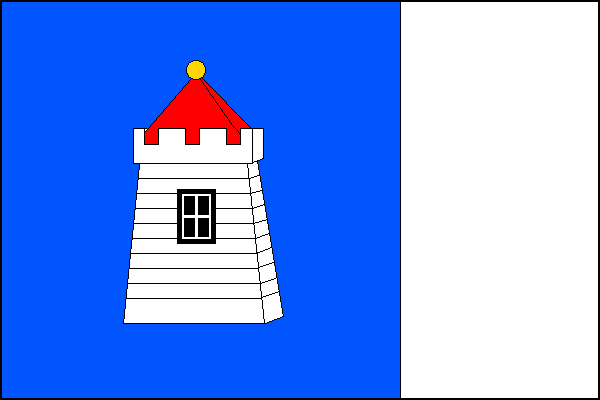
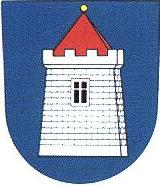
- Flag Coat of arms

- Location in the Czech Republic
- Coordinates: 49°38′21″N 14°15′13″E
- Country: Czech Republic
- Region: Central Bohemian
- District: Příbram
- First mentioned: 1285

Area
  - Total: 11.89 km^{2} (4.59 sq mi)
- Elevation: 274 m (899 ft)

Population (2026-01-01)
  - Total: 1,010
  - Density: 84.9/km^{2} (220/sq mi)
- Time zone: UTC+1 (CET)
  - Summer (DST): UTC+2 (CEST)
- Postal code: 262 63
- Website: www.obeckamyk.cz

Kamýk nad Vltavou is a municipality and village in Příbram District in the Central Bohemian Region of the Czech Republic. It has about 1,000 inhabitants. It lies on the Vltava River.

== Administrative division ==
Kamýk nad Vltavou consists of two municipal parts (in brackets population according to the 2021 census):

- Kamýk nad Vltavou (842)
- Velká (104)

== Etymology ==
The word kamýk is and old Czech diminutive form of the Slavic word kamy, meaning 'little stone', 'little rock'.

== Geography ==
Kamýk nad Vltavou is located about 18 kilometres (11 mi) east of Příbram and 43 km (27 mi) south of Prague. It lies in the Benešov Uplands. The highest point is the hill Bába at 442 m (1,450 ft) above sea level. The Vltava River flows through the municipality. A part of the Kamýk Reservoir, built on the Vltava, is located in the southern part of the municipality.

== History ==
The first written mention of the Vrškamýk Castle is from 1236. The settlements above the castle called Starý Kamýk and Nový Kamýk were first mentioned in 1285. Kamýk was the property of the royal chamber, which lent it to various noble families, including the important families of Rosenberg, Lobkowicz and Pernštejn. In 1561, the royal chamber definitely sold Kamýk to nobles.

Before the Battle of White Mountain, Kamýk was owned by the Myška of Žlunice family, but their properties were consficated, and Kamýk was sold to Polyxena of Lobkowicz in 1623. She merged it with the Vysoký Chlumec estate. The Lobkowicz family owned Kamýk until 1922.

== Demographics ==
Historical population

Year	Pop.	±%
1869	752	—
1880	804	+6.9%
1890	801	−0.4%
1900	797	−0.5%
1910	767	−3.8%

Year	Pop.	±%
1921	739	−3.7%
1930	749	+1.4%
1950	594	−20.7%
1961	714	+20.2%
1970	939	+31.5%

Year	Pop.	±%
1980	879	−6.4%
1991	808	−8.1%
2001	783	−3.1%
2011	867	+10.7%
2021	946	+9.1%

Source: Censuses

== Transport ==
There are no railways or major roads passing through the municipality.

== Sights ==
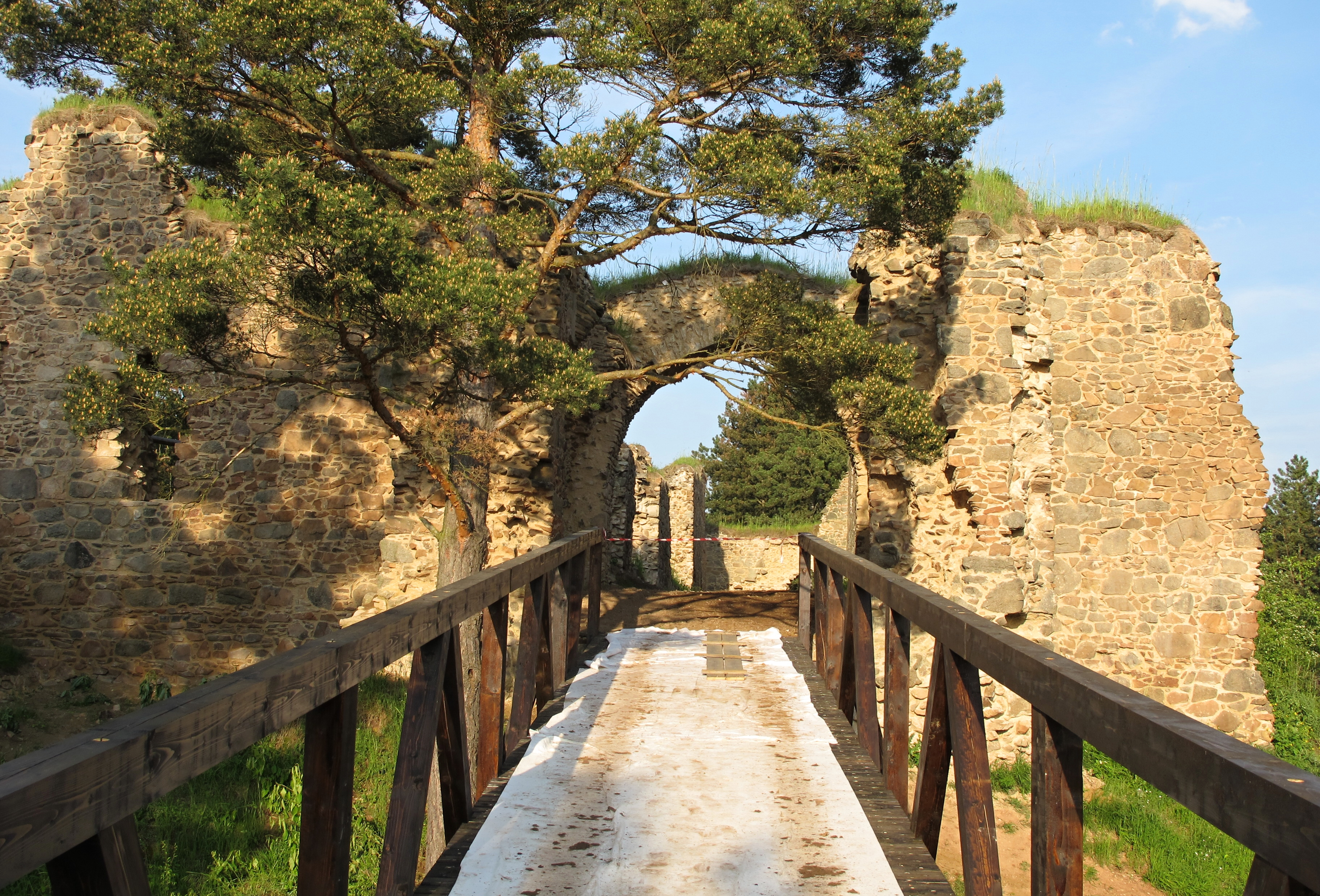
Ruins of the Vrškamýk Castle

The main landmarks of Kamýk nad Vltavou are the castle and the church. The Church of the Nativity of the Virgin Mary dates from the third quarter of the 13th century. In 1775–1787, the early Gothic church was rebuilt in the Baroque style, but some Gothic elements have been preserved to this day.

The medieval castle called Vrškamýk or just Kamýk is now a ruin. It was abandoned in the second half of the 14th century and first described as a ruin in 1569. Only a part of the inner walls has been preserved. Near the church is a lookout tower, also called Vrškamýk.
