= Karlštejn (opera) =

1916 opera by Vítězslav Novák

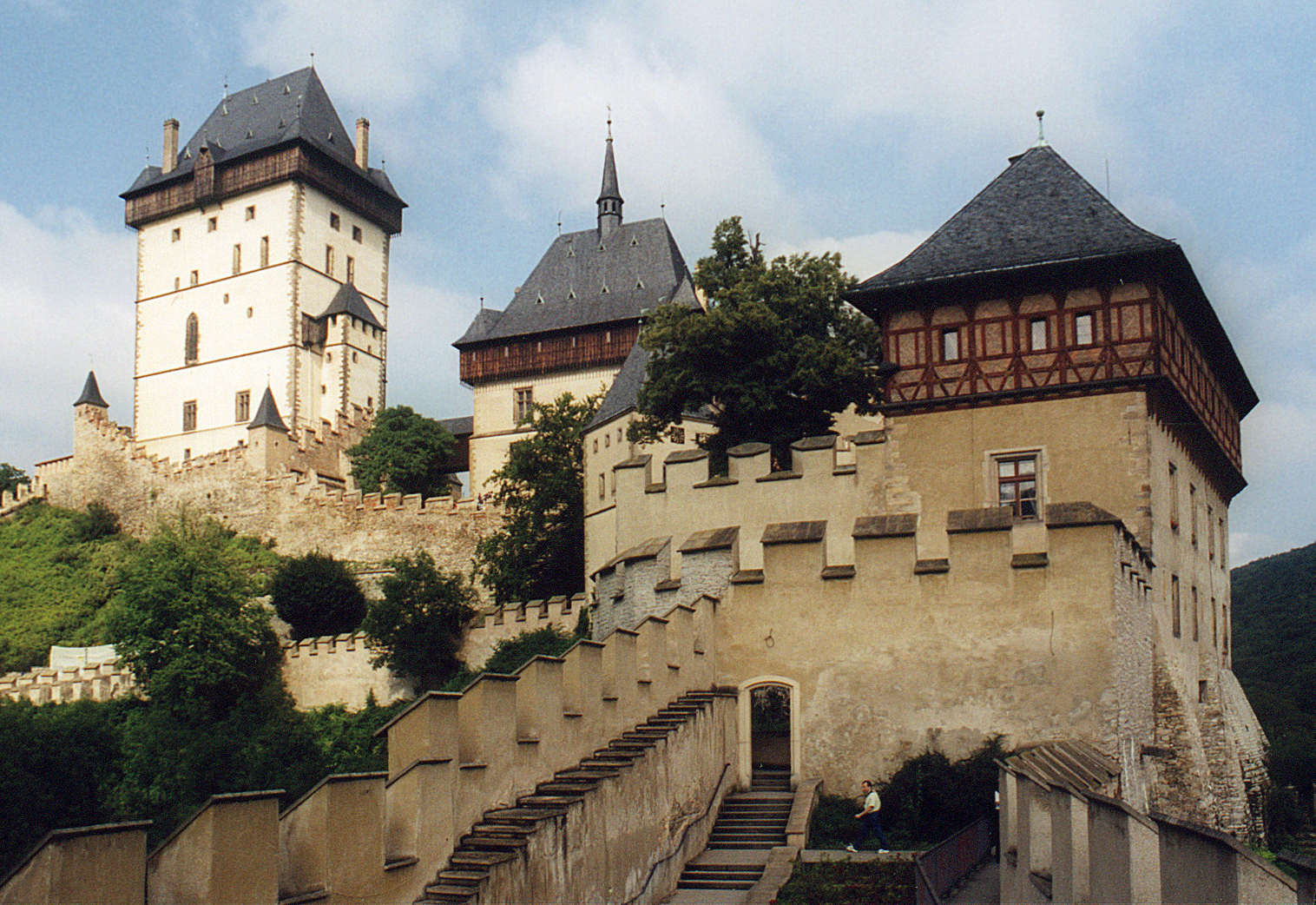
Karlštejn castle

Karlštejn (1916) is an opera by Czech composer Vítězslav Novák, a pupil of Dvořák. It was the composer's second opera and written with nationalist intentions during World War I. The plot is based on Jaroslav Vrchlický's drama of the same name. It was moderately successful and performed over 70 times in Prague.

== Cast ==
| role | voice | premiere (18 Nov. 1916) |
|---|---|---|
| Charles IV, Holy Roman Emperor | bass | Jiří Huml |
| Queen Elizabeth of Pomerania | soprano | Gabriela Horvátová |
| Archbishop Arnošt of Pardubice | bass | Arnold Flögl |
| Peter, a duke of Lombardy | tenor | Theodor Schütz |
| burgrave of Karlštejn castle | bass | Emil Pollert |
| Pešek z Hlavně, page | tenor | Mirko (Vladimír) Štork |
| Alena z Turova, friend of the queen | soprano | Marie Šlechtová |
| a herald | baritone | Jan Fifka |
Conductor: Karel Kovařovic
Producer: Gustav Schmoranz

== Recordings ==
- Aria of Charles IV: Je-li nutno, pane vévodo - Svatý Václave. Sung by Ivan Kusnjer, cond. Libor Pešek. LP Panton 1984, reissued on CD Supraphon 2011.
