= Ivan Kusnjer =

Czech baritone opera singer (born 1951)

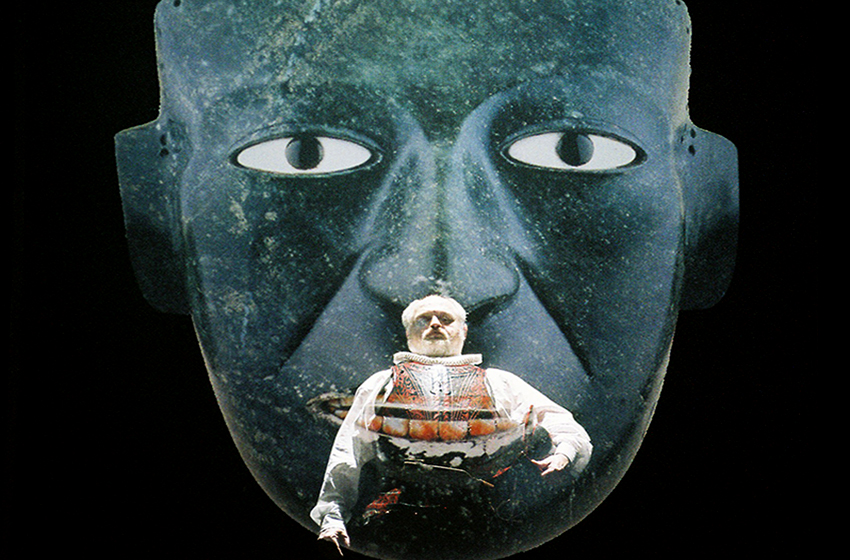
- Ivan Kusnjer as Hernán Cortés, in a scene from the opera La Conquista, 2005

Background information
- Born: 10 November 1951 (age 73); Rokycany
- Genres: Opera
- Occupation: Singer
- Labels: Supraphon

Ivan Kusnjer (born 10 November 1951) is a Czech baritone opera singer. His discography includes recordings of many of the main baritone roles of Czech opera and song.

== Early life, education and family ==
Kusnjer was born in Rokycany in 1951. He graduated from the Music Faculty of the Academy of Performing Arts in Prague, studying with Teodor Šrubař. He performed as an opera singer on stages in Ostrava and Brno. In 1982 he started to work at the National Theatre in Prague. He also attended voice master classes at Accademia Sigiana in Siena and Accademia Santa Cecilia in Rome.

He has performed on opera and concert stages around the world, including La Scala in Milan, Carnegie Hall in New York City, Opéra-Comique and Théâtre du Châtelet in Paris, Opéra national de Lorraine in Nancy, Vienna's Staatsoper, La Monnaie in Brussels, and the Berlin State Opera. He has won acclaim at festivals in Cagliari, Hong Kong, Tel Aviv, Frankfurt and Gothenburg.

Ivan Kusnjer is a founder of the Fatum foundation, which supports families of musicians who died.

== Awards ==
He has three Thalia Awards, for the roles of Tonio in Leoncavallo's Pagliacci (1994), King George in Peter Maxwell Davies's Eight Songs for a Mad King (1997) and Vok Vítkovic in Smetana's The Devil’s Wall (2001). He also received the Gustav Mahler Award in 2000.

== Selected recordings ==
- Czech Opera Rarities (Supraphon 1984; reissued 2011) Arias include:
  - Josef Mysliveček's Abramo e Isaco
  - Josef Leopold Zvonař's Záboj
  - Skuherský's Lora
  - Karel Šebor's The Templars in Moravia (Czech: Templáři na Moravě)
  - Smetana's The Brandenburgers in Bohemia (Czech: Braniboři v Čechách)
  - Dvořák's Vanda
  - Josef Rozkošný's St John's Rapids (Czech: Svatojanské proudy)
  - Karel Bendl's Lejla
  - Eduard Nápravník's Dubrovskij
  - Josef Foerster's Jessika
  - Otakar Ostrčil's The Death of Vlasta
  - Zdeněk Fibich's Hedy
  - Jiří Pauer's Zuzana Vojířová
  - Vítězslav Novák's Karlštejn
- Dvořák The Spectre's Bride 2002; Macal, New Jersey Symphony, Delos CD DE 3296.
