= St John's Rapids =

Former Vltava River rapids

Coordinates: 49°50′21″N 14°26′46″E

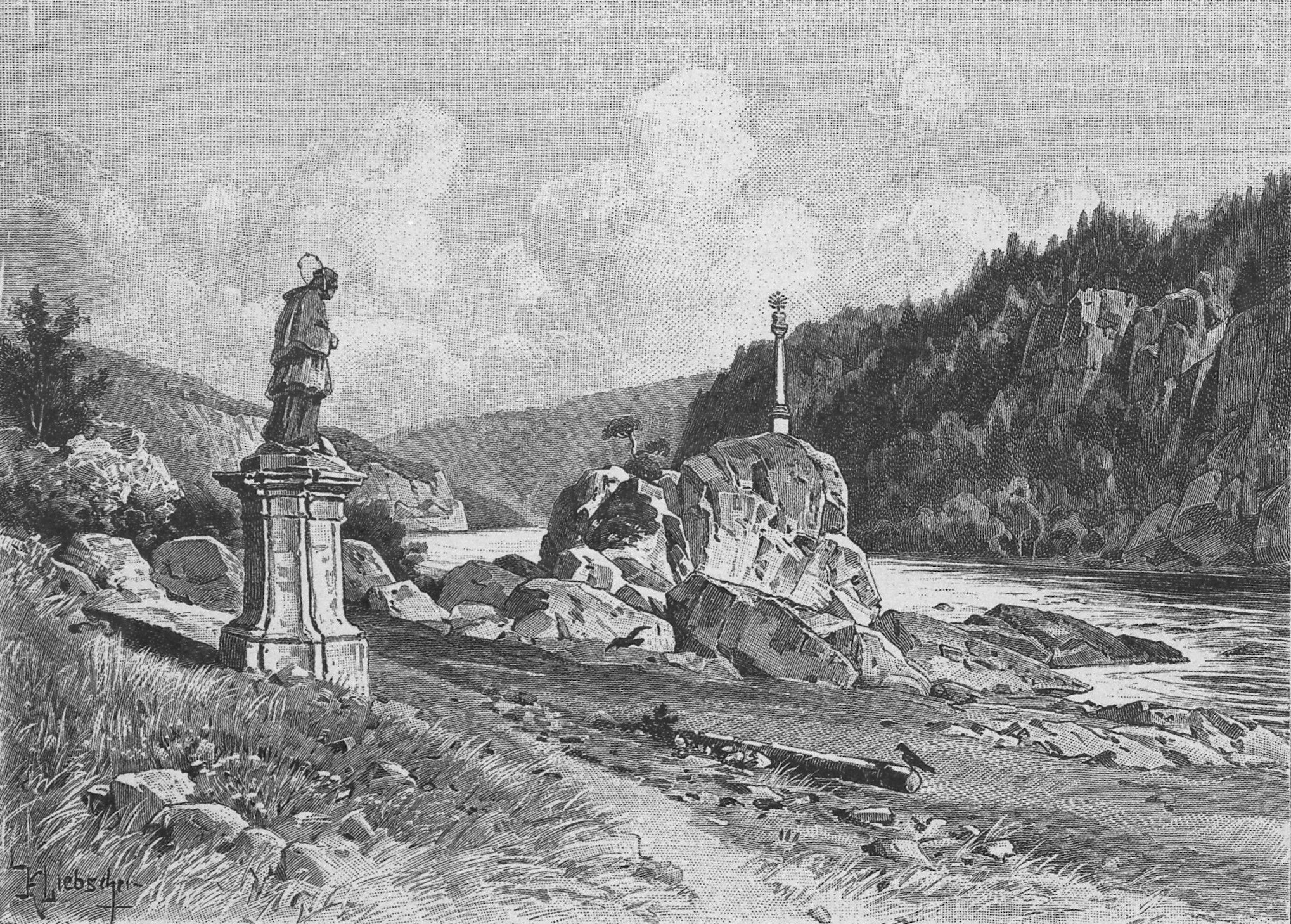
St. John's rapids at the beginning of the 19th century, by Karel Liebscher

St. John's rapids (Svatojánské proudy) was a stretch of fast flowing water on the Vltava. It was situated at the place of today's Štěchovice Reservoir.

== In music ==
The rapids were part of the inspiration for Smetana's Má vlast, and also the title of an opera by Josef Richard Rozkošný (Svatojánské proudy).
