= Mnichovice =

- Town
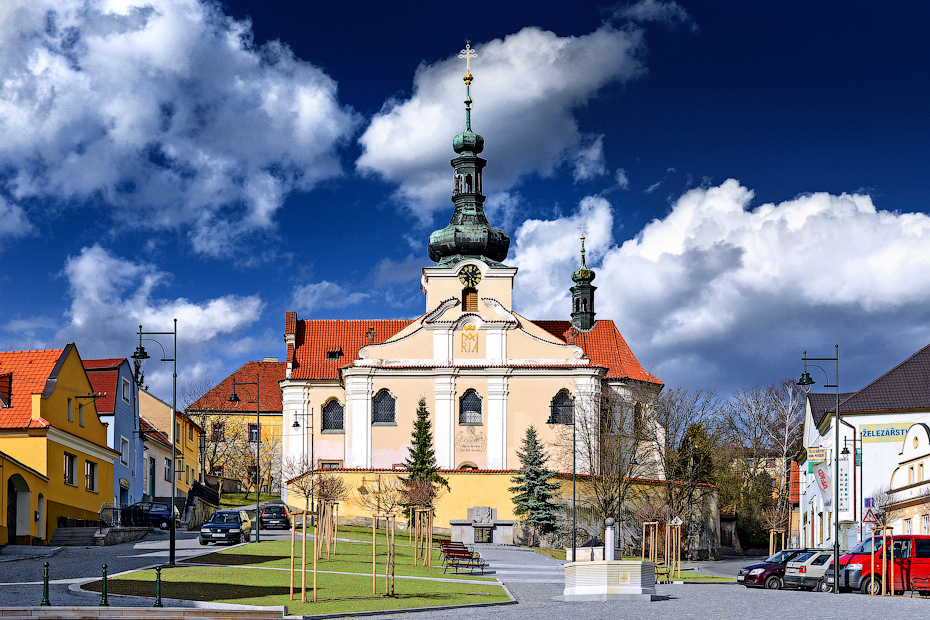
- Church of the Nativity of the Virgin Mary

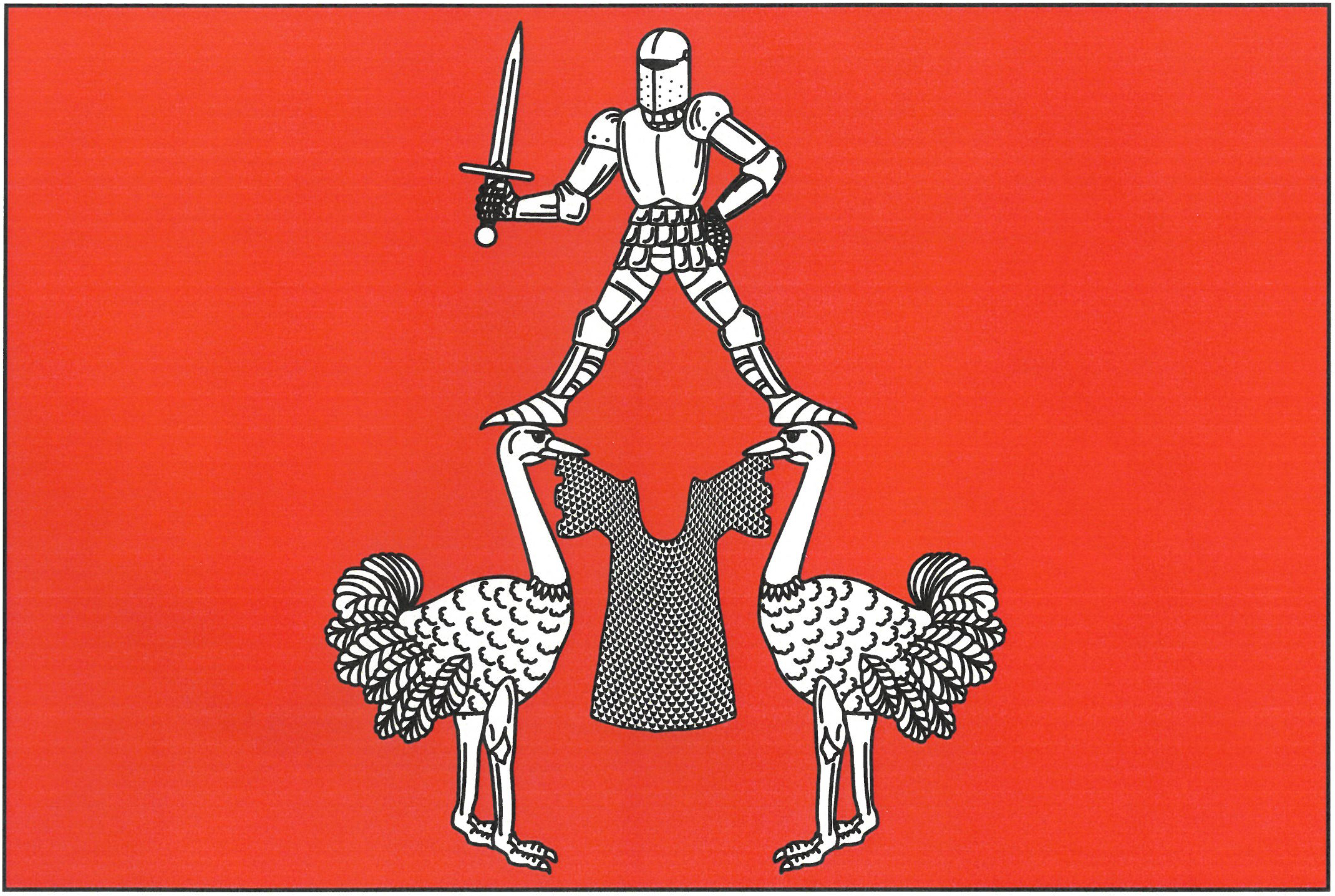
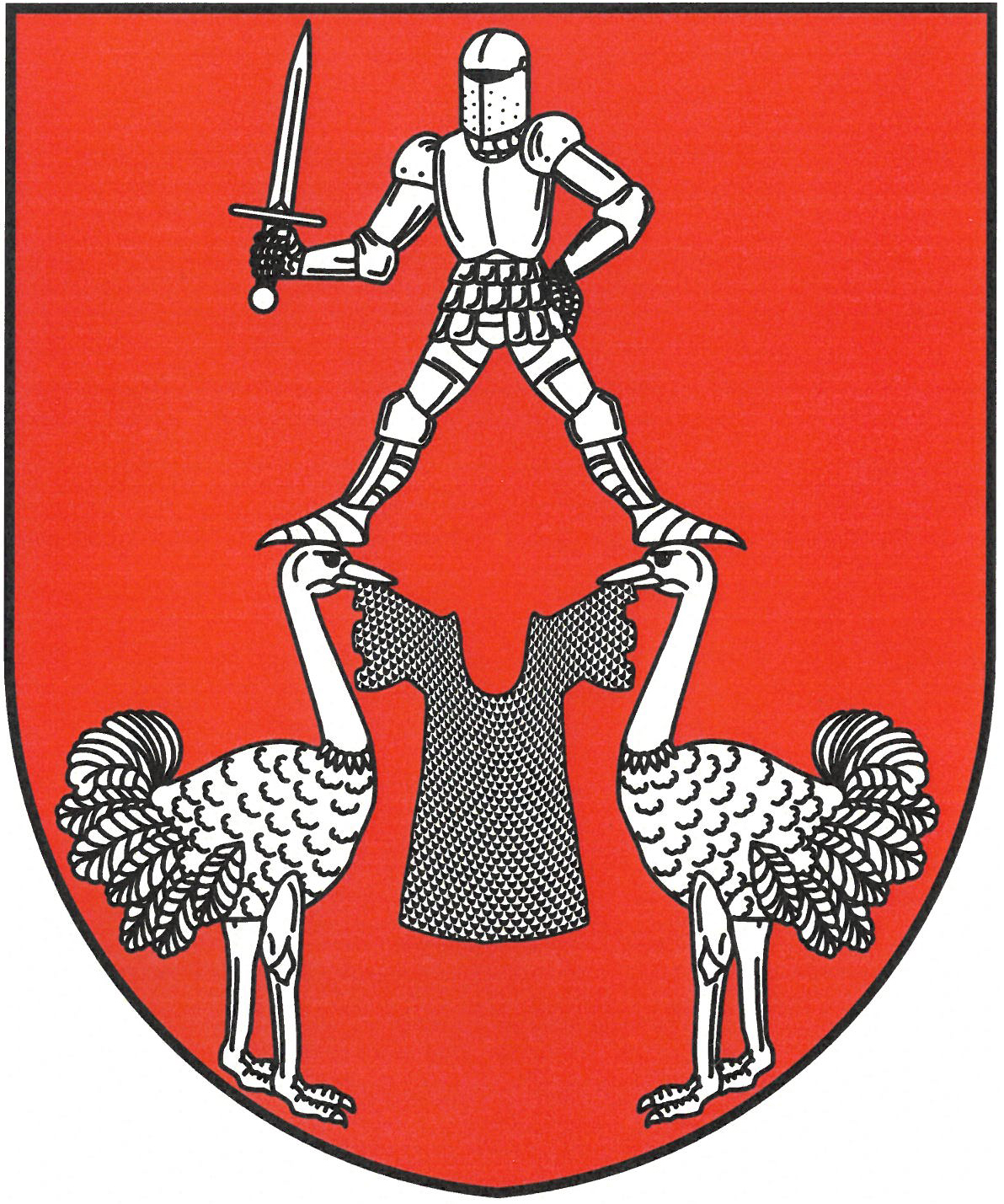
- Flag Coat of arms

- Location in the Czech Republic
- Coordinates: 49°56′12″N 14°42′45″E
- Country: Czech Republic
- Region: Central Bohemian
- District: Prague-East
- First mentioned: 1135

Government
  - Mayor: Margita Valentová

Area
  - Total: 8.32 km^{2} (3.21 sq mi)
- Elevation: 361 m (1,184 ft)

Population (2026-01-01)
  - Total: 4,206
  - Density: 506/km^{2} (1,310/sq mi)
- Time zone: UTC+1 (CET)
  - Summer (DST): UTC+2 (CEST)
- Postal code: 251 64
- Website: www.mnichovice.cz

Mnichovice (Czech pronunciation: [ˈmɲɪxovɪtsɛ]) is a town in Prague-East District in the Central Bohemian Region of the Czech Republic. It has about 4,200 inhabitants. The town is located on the Mnichovka Stream in the Benešov Uplands. The main landmark is the Church of the Nativity of the Virgin Mary.

== Administrative division ==
Mnichovice consists of three municipal parts (in brackets population according to the 2021 census):

- Mnichovice (3,175)
- Božkov (673)
- Myšlín (308)

== Etymology ==
The name Mnichovice is derived from the Czech word mnich (i.e. 'monk'), meaning "monks' village". It refers to the monks who founded the settlement.

== Geography ==
Mnichovice is located about 17 kilometres (11 mi) southeast of Prague. It lies in the Benešov Uplands. The highest point is at 478 m (1,568 ft) above sea level. The Mnichovka Stream flows through the town.

== History ==
The first written mention of Mnichovice is from 1134. The village was founded by the monks from the Sázava Monastery, who founded here a Romanesque basilica in 1140. In 1420, Mnichovice became a market town. After the monastery was conquered by the Hussites in 1421, the market town became their property. Shortly after that, in 1422, it was acquired by the Kostka of Postupice family. Mnichovice was badly damaged by fires in 1531 and 1631, and it was also devastated during the Thirty Years' War in 1638. Further fires damaged the market town in 1746, 1751 and 1865–1872.

From 1852 to 1945, Mnichovice had the title of a town. Its town status was restored in 2000.

== Demographics ==
Historical population

Year	Pop.	±%
1869	1,182	—
1880	1,095	−7.4%
1890	1,010	−7.8%
1900	1,112	+10.1%
1910	1,384	+24.5%

Year	Pop.	±%
1921	1,588	+14.7%
1930	2,330	+46.7%
1950	2,509	+7.7%
1961	2,641	+5.3%
1970	2,326	−11.9%

Year	Pop.	±%
1980	2,236	−3.9%
1991	1,974	−11.7%
2001	2,138	+8.3%
2011	3,180	+48.7%
2021	4,156	+30.7%

Source: Censuses

== Transport ==
The D1 motorway from Prague to Brno runs along the western municipal border just outside the municipal territory.

== Sights ==
The main landmark of Mnichovice is the Church of the Nativity of the Virgin Mary. The original Romanesque church was rebuilt in the Gothic style around 1330, then it was rebuilt in the Baroque style in 1746–1754.
