= Slapy Reservoir =

Reservoir in Central Bohemian Region, Czech Republic

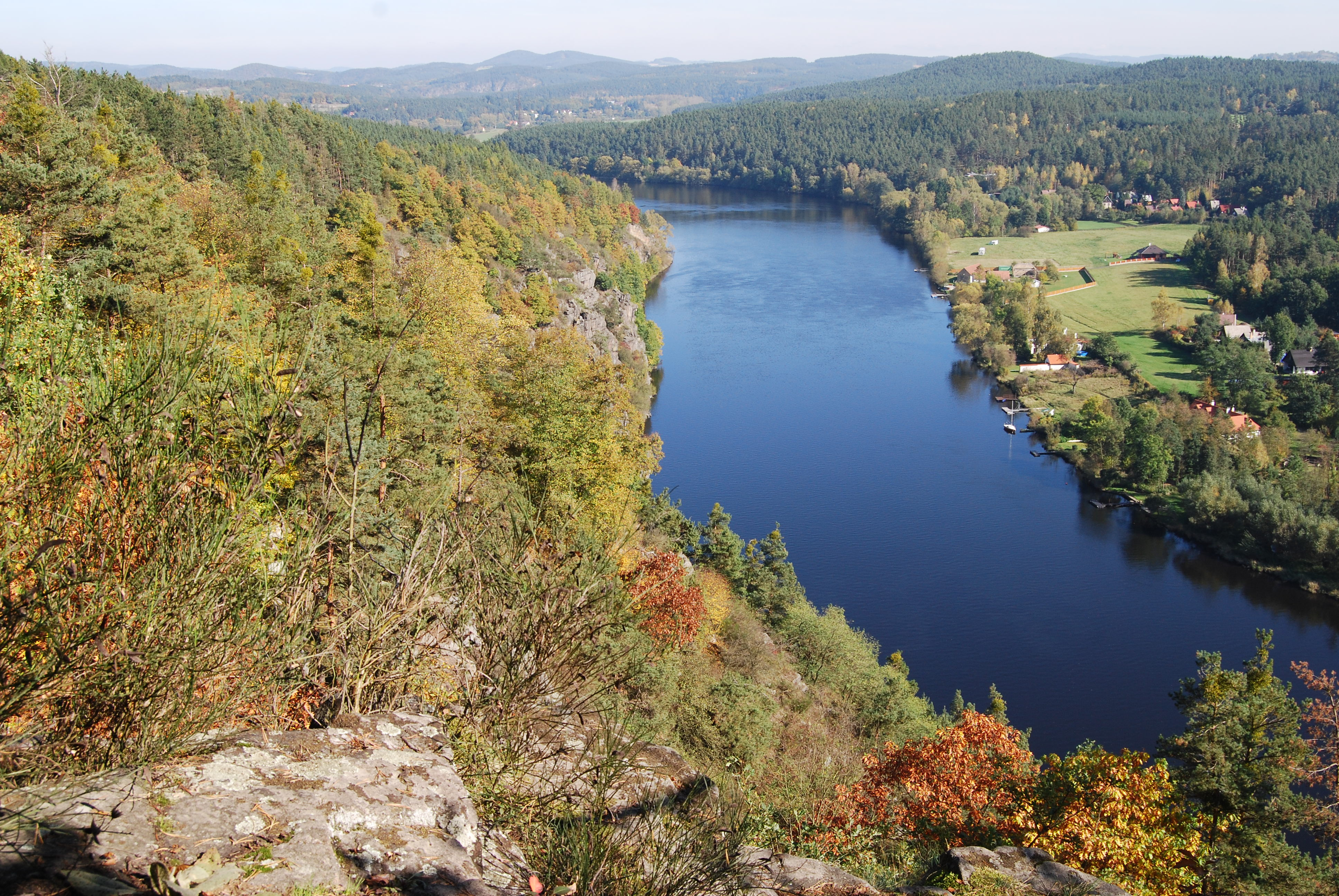
- Southern part of the reservoir

- Location within Czech Republic
- Coordinates: 49°44′13″N 14°23′46″E
- Type: reservoir
- Primary inflows: Vltava
- Primary outflows: Vltava
- Catchment area: 12.96 km^{2} (5.00 sq mi)
- Basin countries: Czech Republic
- Max. length: 43 km (27 mi)
- Surface area: 11.63 km^{2} (4.49 sq mi)
- Average depth: 20 km^{2} (7.7 sq mi)
- Max. depth: 53 km^{2} (20 sq mi)
- Water volume: 269.3×10^{6} m^{3} (218,300 acre⋅ft)
- Surface elevation: 271 m (889 ft)

Slapy Reservoir (Czech: vodní nádrž Slapy) is a reservoir in the Central Bohemian Region of the Czech Republic. With an area of 11.63 km^{2} (4.49 sq mi), it is the sixth largest reservoir in the country. Built on the Vltava River, it is part of the so-called Vltava Cascade.

== Location ==
Slapy is located in the Central Bohemian Region, in the Benešov Uplands. It lies about 22 kilometres (14 mi) south of Prague. It is named after the village of Slapy, located near the dam. Slapy Reservoir was built on the Vltava River as part of the so-called Vltava Cascade: it is preceded by Orlík Reservoir and followed by Štěchovice Reservoir.

== Characteristics ==
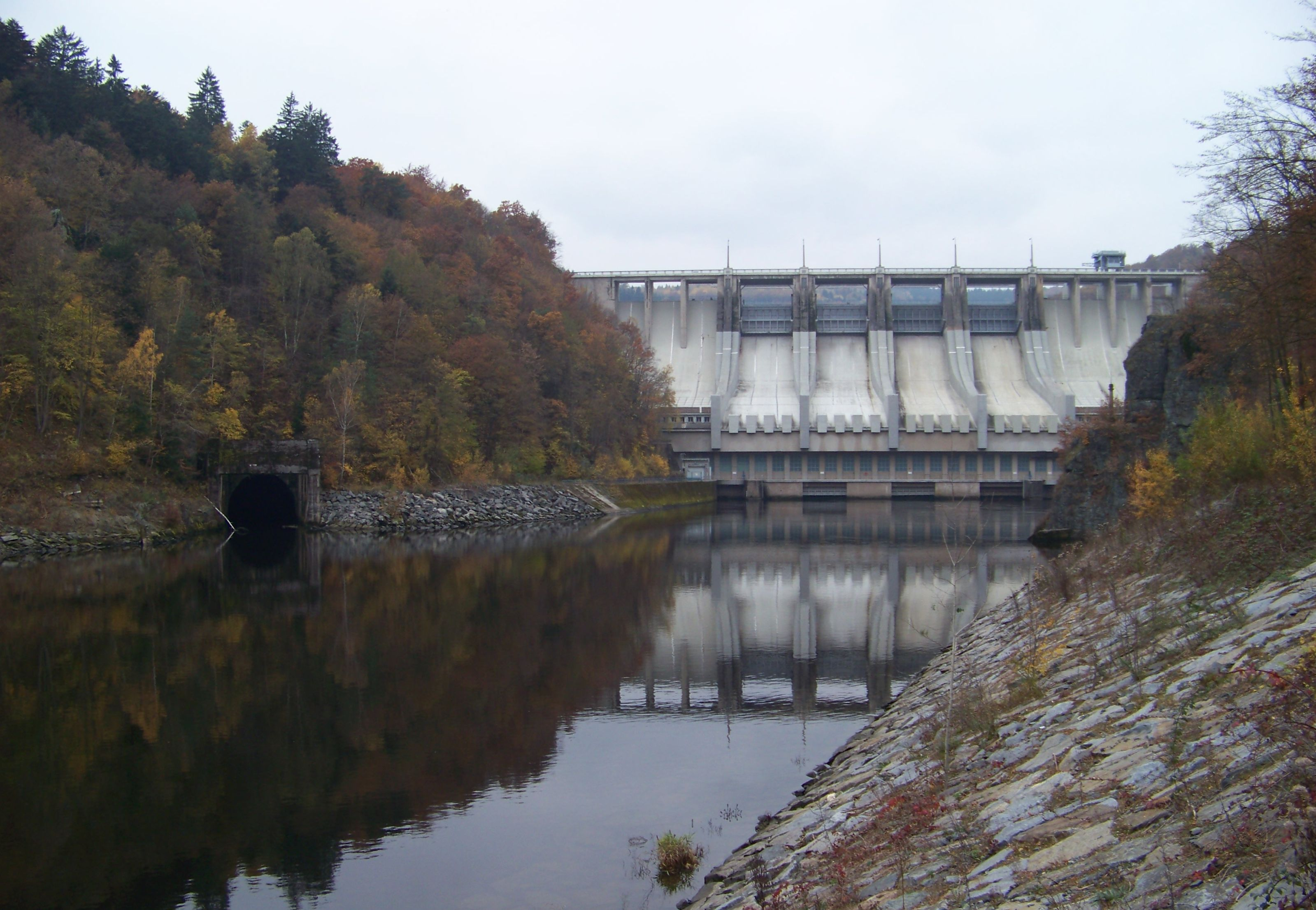
Slapy Dam

Slapy has an area of the water surface of 11.63 km^{2} (4.49 sq mi) and total capacity of 269,300,000 m^{3} (218,300 acre⋅ft). The catchment area is 12.96 km^{2} (5.00 sq mi). The average depth is about 20 km^{2} (7.7 sq mi) and the maximum depth is about 53 km^{2} (20 sq mi). The current water level is 35 metres higher than the original bed of the Vltava. The length of the reservoir is 43 km (27 mi). The dam is 60 m (200 ft) high. The reservoir is managed by Povodí Vltavy, a state-owned enterprise.

== History ==
The reservoir was built in 1949–1955. Filling began unplanned in 1954 due to a flood that filled the reservoir within a few days. The construction of a lock was planned, but due to time and financial reasons, it was not implemented.

== Purpose ==
The main purpose of the reservoir is to improve the river flow for water transport and for water use, and provision of water for energy use. The reservoir also partially protects the area under the dam (especially the city of Prague) from floods. The dam is also used for fish farming, sports and recreation.

The hydroelectric power station is situated at the base of the dam body. It is equipped with three Kaplan turbines.

== Tourism ==
There are four campsites and many guesthouses and beaches on the shores of the reservoir. Sports for which the reservoir is used include sailing, water skiing and windsurfing.
