= Štěchovice Reservoir =

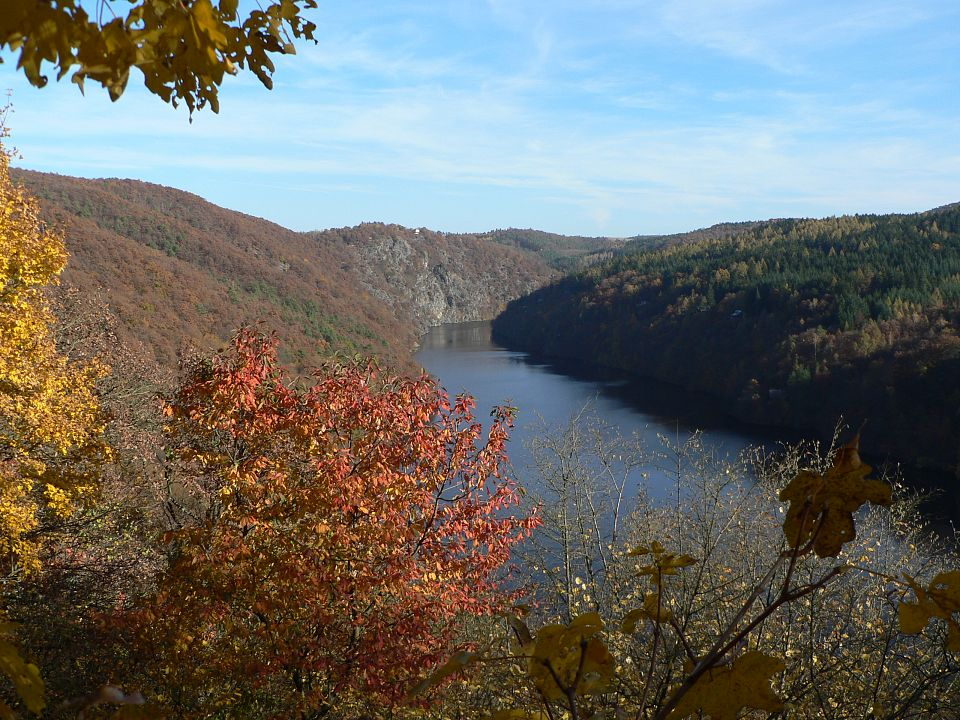
- Štěchovice Reservoir

- Location within Czech Republic
- Coordinates: 49°51′N 14°26′E
- Type: reservoir
- Primary inflows: Vltava
- Primary outflows: Vltava
- Basin countries: Czech Republic
- Surface area: 95.7 ha (236 acres)
- Water volume: 11.2 million cubic metres (9,100 acre⋅ft)

Štěchovice Reservoir (Czech: Vodní nádrž Štěchovice) is a reservoir on the Vltava River in the Central Bohemian Region of the Czech Republic. It was built from 1937 to 1945 as the second stage of the Vltava Cascade. The reservoir is named after the market town of Štěchovice.

The construction started before World War II and, because of the need for electricity, resources were allocated for the project in spite of a general shortage. The power station was put in action in 1943. The reservoir had flooded St John's Rapids (Svatojánské proudy).

The main role of the reservoir is to balance the water runoff from peak-load power station at Slapy Reservoir and to propel two Kaplan turbines with total installed power 2 x 11.25 MW (Štěchovice I). A lock (20.1 m difference between water levels, length 118 m) handles ships with displacement up to 1,000 tons.

The reservoir is also used by the pumped-storage hydroelectric plant Štěchovice II, whose upper reservoir was created on the top of Homole hill. The plant was set in operation in 1947 and closed in 1991 due to obsolescence. From 1992 to 1996 a new hydroelectric plant using the reservoirs was built. This plant uses a reverse Francis turbine with power 45 MW.

During 2002 floods the turbines of both power plants were severely damaged. After overhaul the plants were put back in production in 2004 and 2005 respectively.

== Technical parameters of the reservoir ==
- height of the dam: 22.5 m
- length of the dam arch: 124 m
- held back water stretches 9.4 km
- reservoir area: 95.7 hectares
- water capacity: 11.2 million m³
- located on 84.4 km of the river
