= Benešov Uplands =

Topographic feature of the Czech Republic

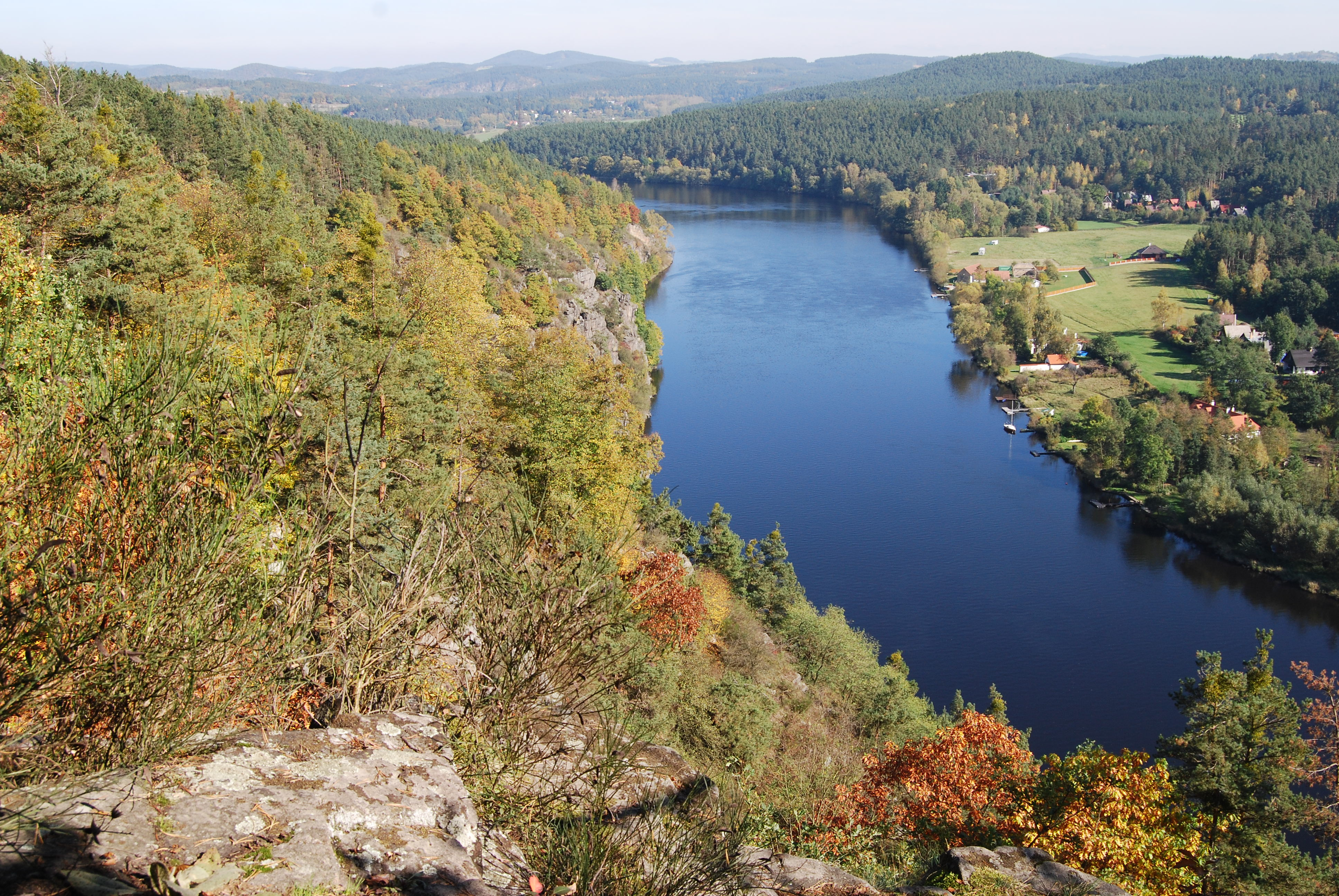
- Slapy Reservoir

Highest point
- Peak: Stráž
- Elevation: 638 m (2,093 ft)

Dimensions
- Length: 94 km (58 mi)
- Area: 2,410 km^{2} (930 mi^{2})

Geography
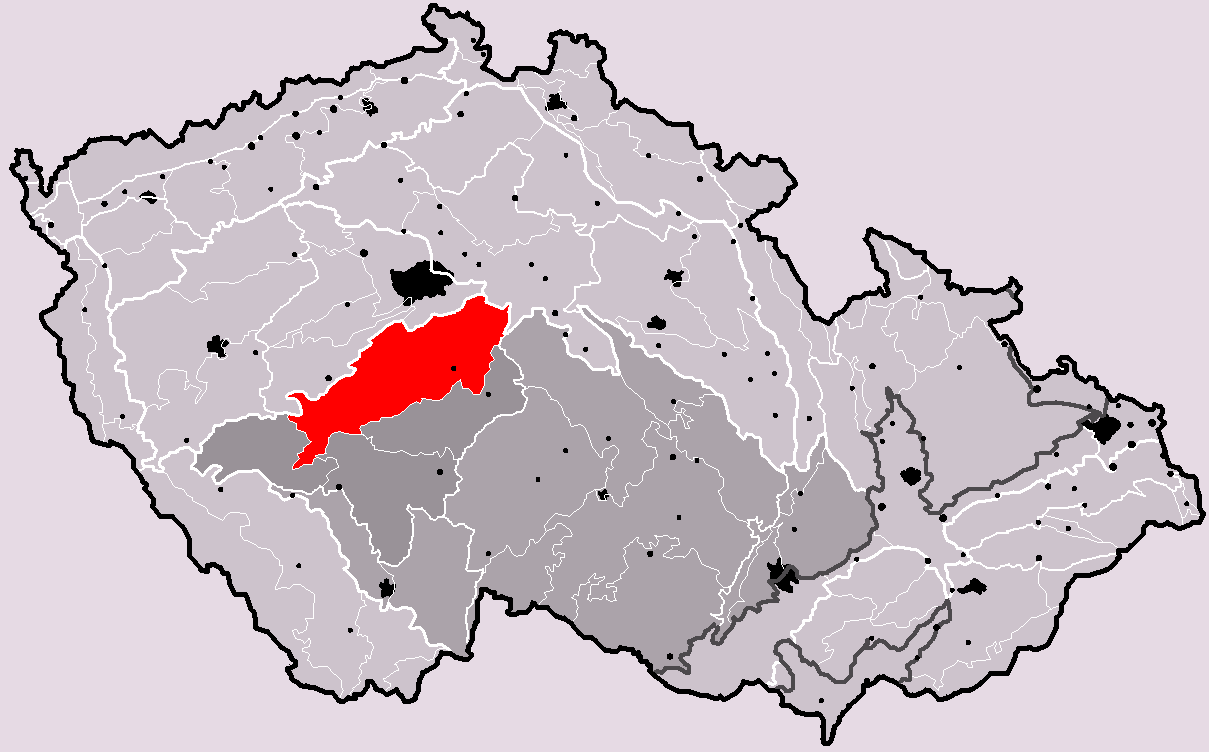
- Benešov Uplands in the geomorphological system of the Czech Republic
- Country: Czech Republic
- Regions: Central Bohemian, South Bohemian
- Range coordinates: 49°45′N 14°27′E
- Parent range: Central Bohemian Hills

Geology
- Rock type(s): Granite, granodiorite, diorite, orthogneiss

The Benešov Uplands or Benešov Hills (Czech: Benešovská pahorkatina) are uplands and a geomorphological mesoregion of the Czech Republic. It is located mostly in the Central Bohemian Region. It belongs to the largest mesoregions in the country. It is named after Benešov, which is the most populated town in the territory.

== Geomorphology ==
The Benešov Uplands is a mesoregion of the Central Bohemian Hills within the Bohemian Massif. It is a rugged hilly area with erosional denudation relief, tectonically disturbed, with distinct structural ridges and inselbergs. The uplands are further subdivided into the microregions of Březnice Uplands and Dobříš Uplands.

There are a lot of medium-high hills. The highest peaks are located in the southwestern part of the territory. The highest peaks of the Benešov Uplands are:

- Stráž, 638 m (2,093 ft)
- Pteč, 633 m (2,077 ft)
- Hrby, 627 m (2,057 ft)
- Špalková hora, 620 m (2,030 ft)
- Drahenický vrch, 615 m (2,018 ft)
- Levín, 612 m (2,008 ft)
- Vraneč, 608 m (1,995 ft)
- Kozí vrch, 603 m (1,978 ft)
- Mumlin, 602 m (1,975 ft)
- Holý vrch, 599 m (1,965 ft)

== Geography ==
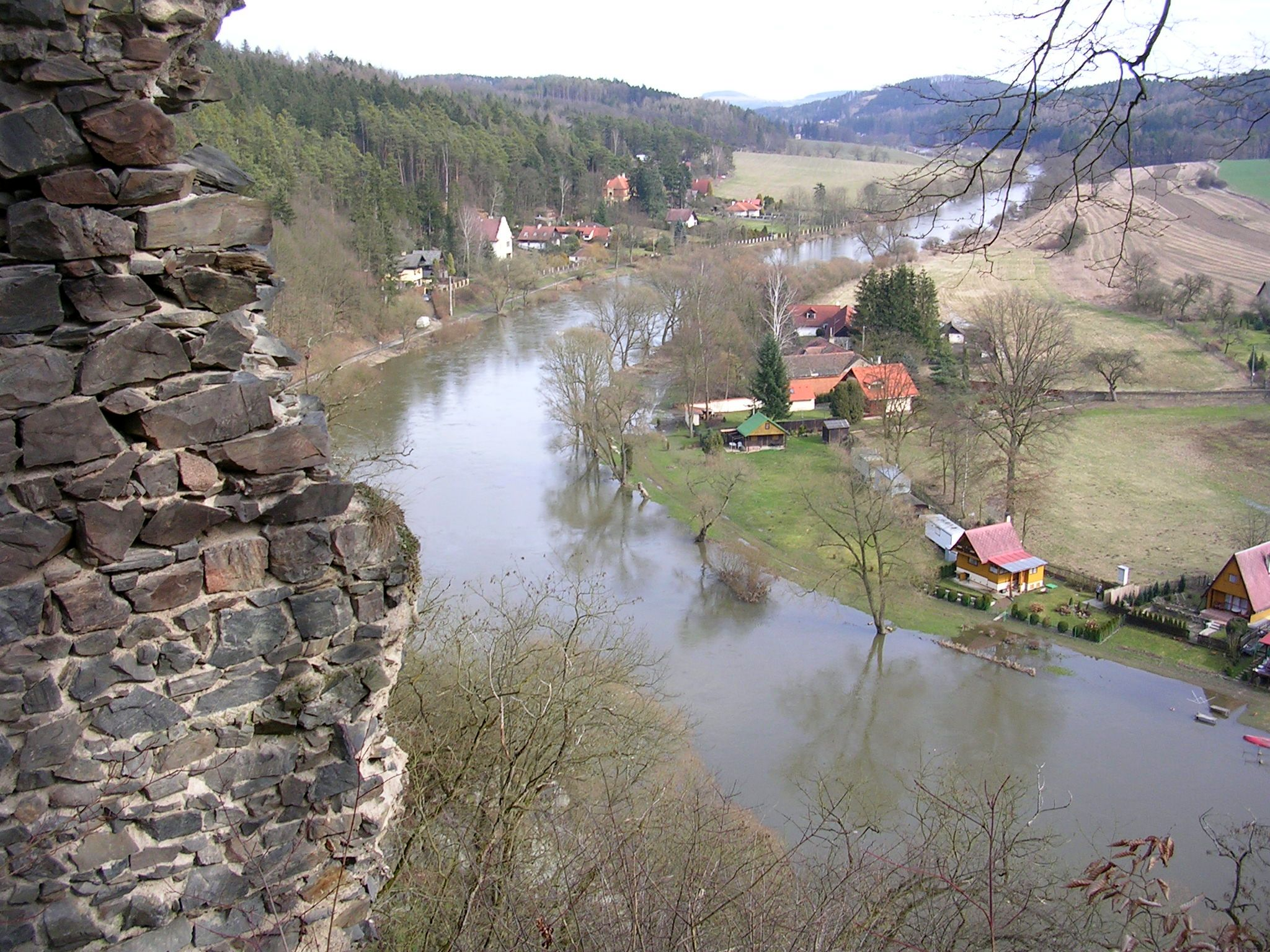
The Sázava River in the Benešov Uplands

The Benešov Uplands stretches from southwest to northeast. The uplands have an area of 2,410 square kilometres (930 sq mi) and an average elevation of 366 metres (1,201 ft). It is the fourth largest mesoregion in the Czech Republic.

The main watercourse is the Vltava River, which flows across the territory from south to north. Several reservoirs built on the Vltava are located in the Benešov Uplands: Orlík, Kamýk, Slapy, Štěchovice and Vrané. The second significant river is the Sázava, which flows from the east until it joins the Vltava.

Suitable natural conditions contributed to the creation of many settlements in the Benešov Uplands, but there are no large cities. The most populated towns in the territory are Benešov, Dobříš, Sedlčany, Týnec nad Sázavou, Jílové u Prahy, Bystřice, Rožmitál pod Třemšínem, Kostelec nad Černými lesy and Mnichovice.

== Geology and pedology ==
The geological bedrock is dominated by granites, granodiorites, diorites and orthogneisses. The soils are shallow or medium deep. Stone is quarried in the territory. The area is also historically associated with gold mining.

== Protection of nature ==
Despite the large area of the territory, there are almost no large-scale protected areas. The only exception is a negligible part of the Brdy Protected Landscape Area, which extends to the territory in the west. The most valuable small-scale protected areas are the national nature reserves Ve Studeném and Voděradské bučiny.

== Gallery ==
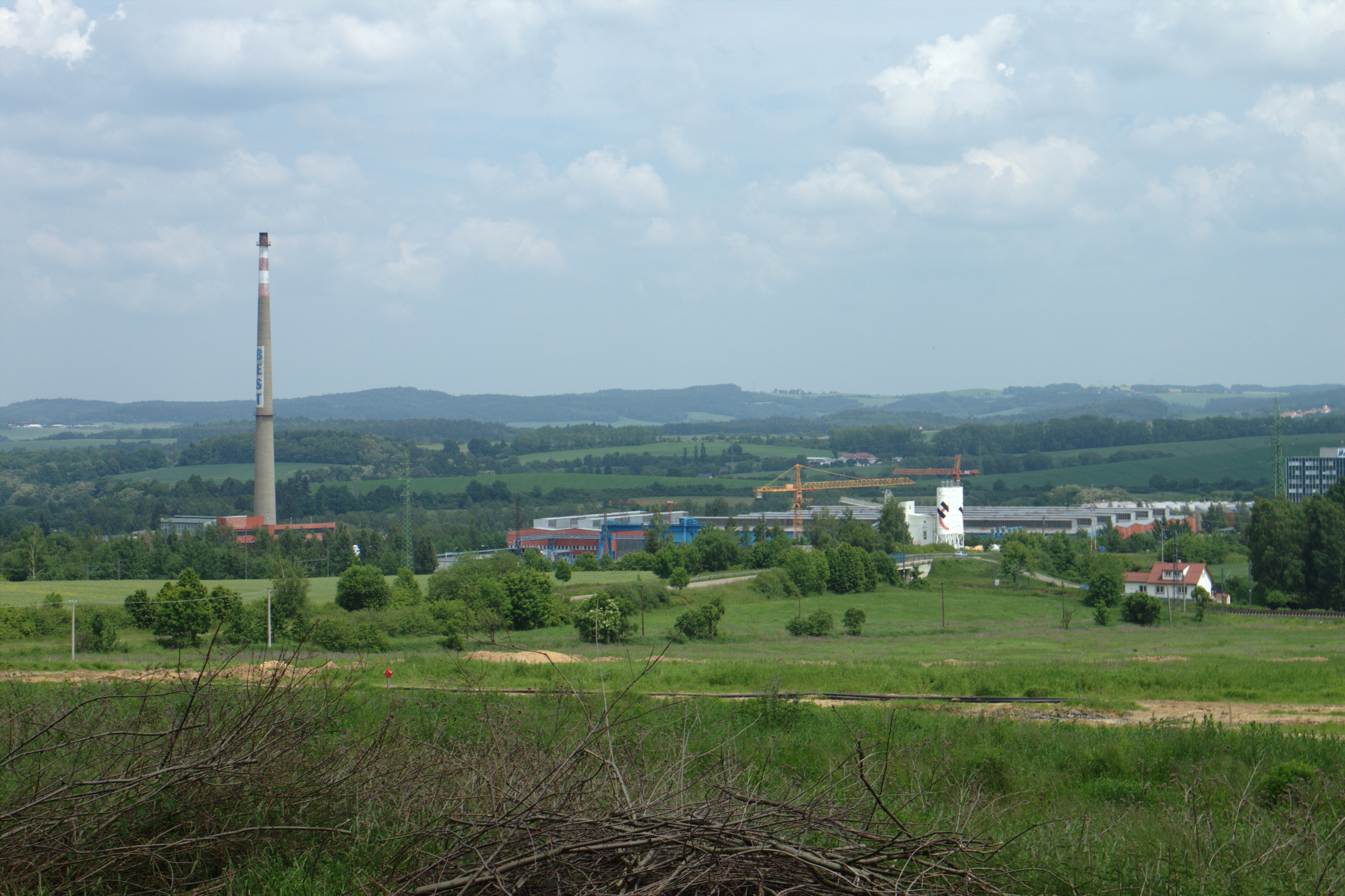
Outskirts of Benešov

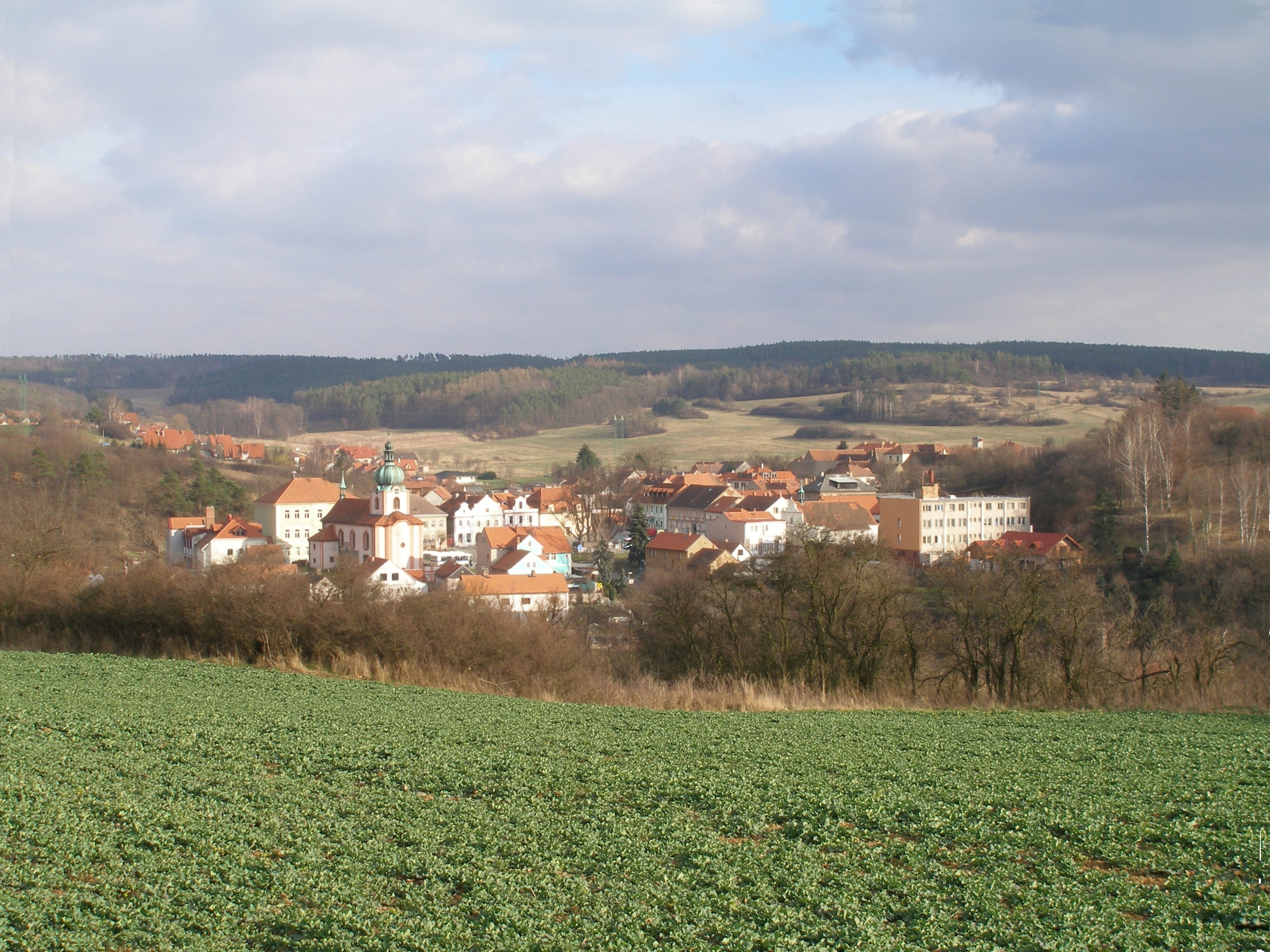
Nový Knín and surroundings

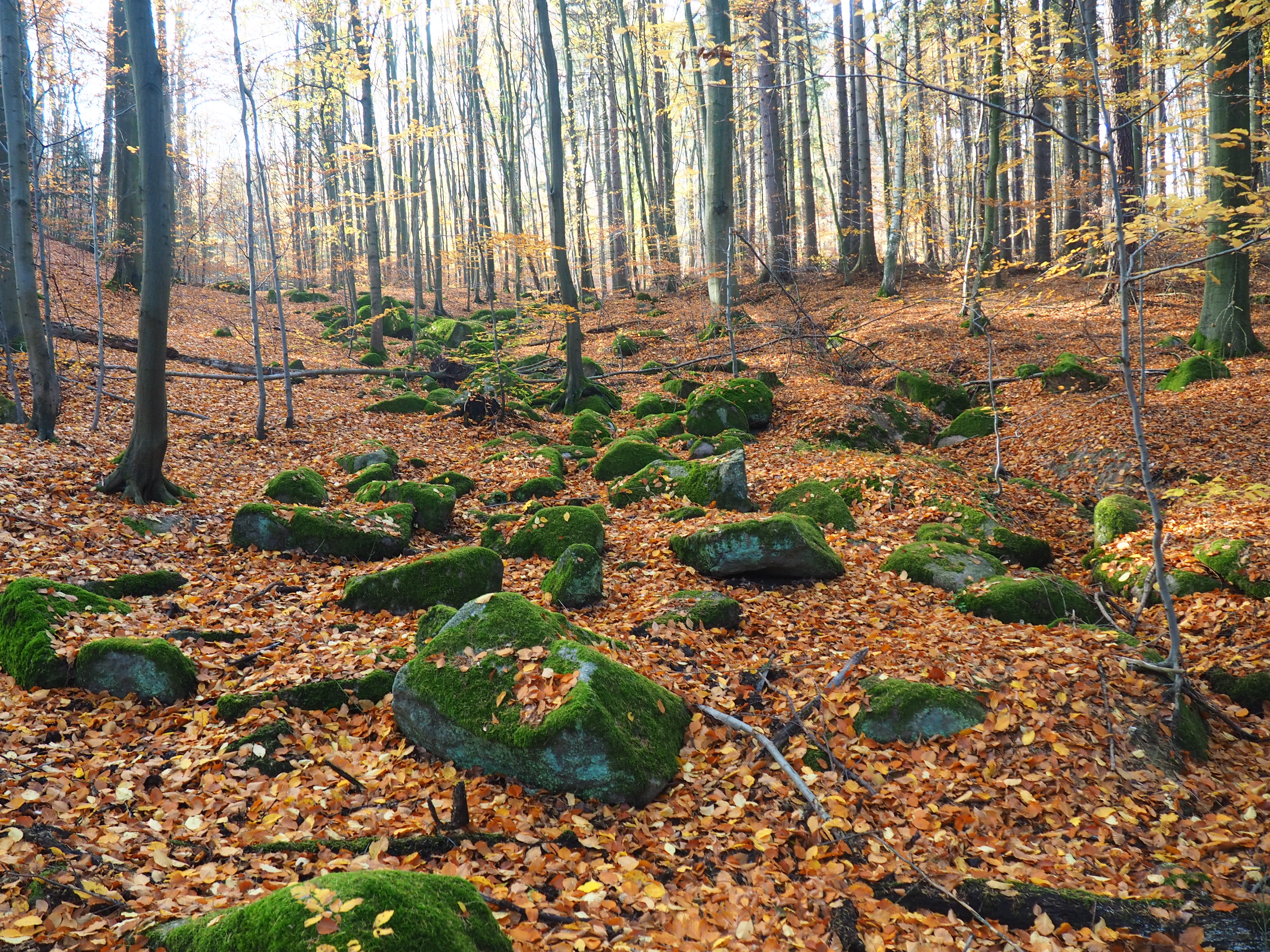
Voděradské bučiny National Nature Reserve
