= Vltava =

Longest river in the Czech Republic

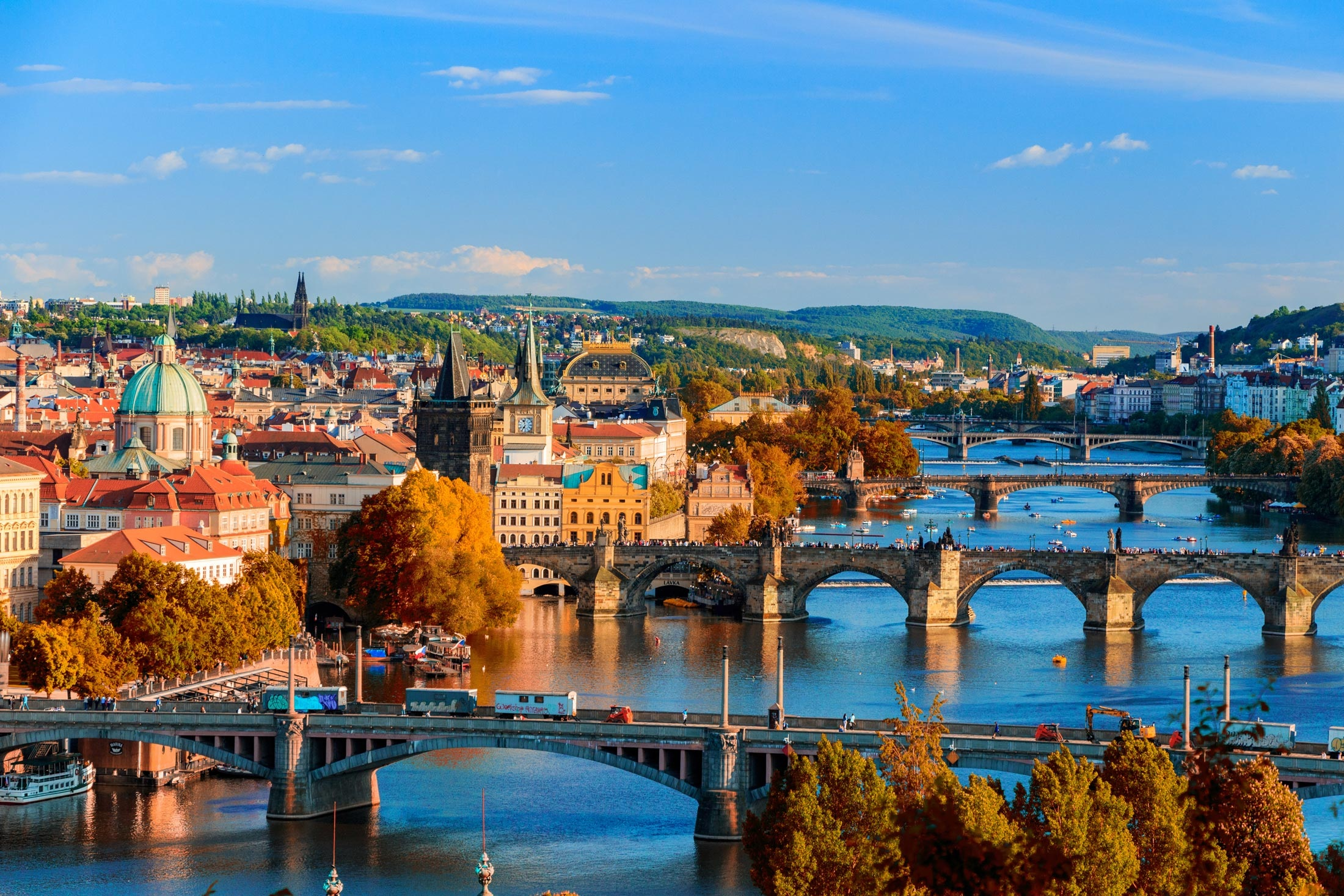
- The Vltava in Prague

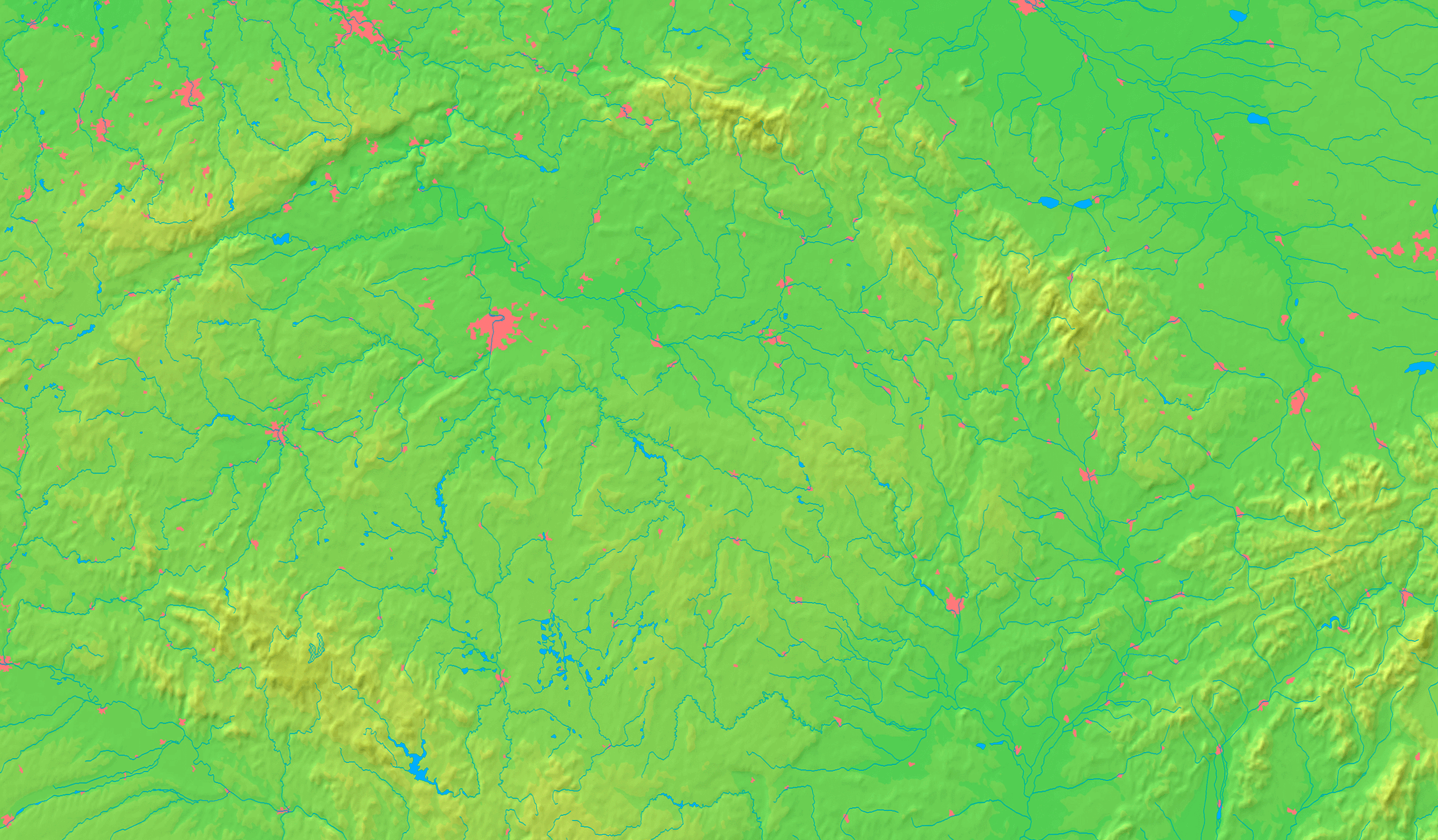
- The course and drainage basin of the Vltava from its source to its confluence with the Elbe (magenta)

Location
- Country: Czech Republic
- Regions: South Bohemian; Central Bohemian
- Cities: České Budějovice; Prague

Physical characteristics
- Source: Teplá Vltava
  - location: Kvilda, Bohemian Forest
  - coordinates: 48°58′29″N 13°33′39″E
  - elevation: 1,174 m (3,852 ft)
- Mouth
  - location: Elbe
  - coordinates: 50°20′29″N 14°28′30″E
  - elevation: 156 m (512 ft)
- Length: 431.3 km (268.0 mi)
- Basin size: 28,089.9 km^{2} (10,845.6 sq mi)
- Discharge
  - average: 149.9 m^{3}/s (5,290 cu ft/s) near estuary

Basin features
- Progression: Elbe→ North Sea
- Tributaries
  - left: Otava, Berounka
  - right: Lužnice, Sázava

The Vltava (/ˈvʊltəvə, ˈvʌl-/ VU(U)L-tə-və, Czech: [ˈvl̩tava]; German: Moldau) is the longest river in the Czech Republic, a left tributary of the Elbe River. It runs southeast along the Bohemian Forest and then north across Bohemia, through Český Krumlov, České Budějovice, and Prague. It is commonly referred to as the "Czech national river".

== Etymology ==
Both the Czech name Vltava and the German name Moldau are believed to originate from the old Germanic words *wilt ahwa 'wild water' (compare Latin aqua). In the Annales Fuldenses (872 AD) it is called Fuldaha; from 1113 AD it is attested as Wultha. In the Chronica Boemorum (1125 AD) it is attested for the first time in its Bohemian form, Wlitaua.

== Course ==
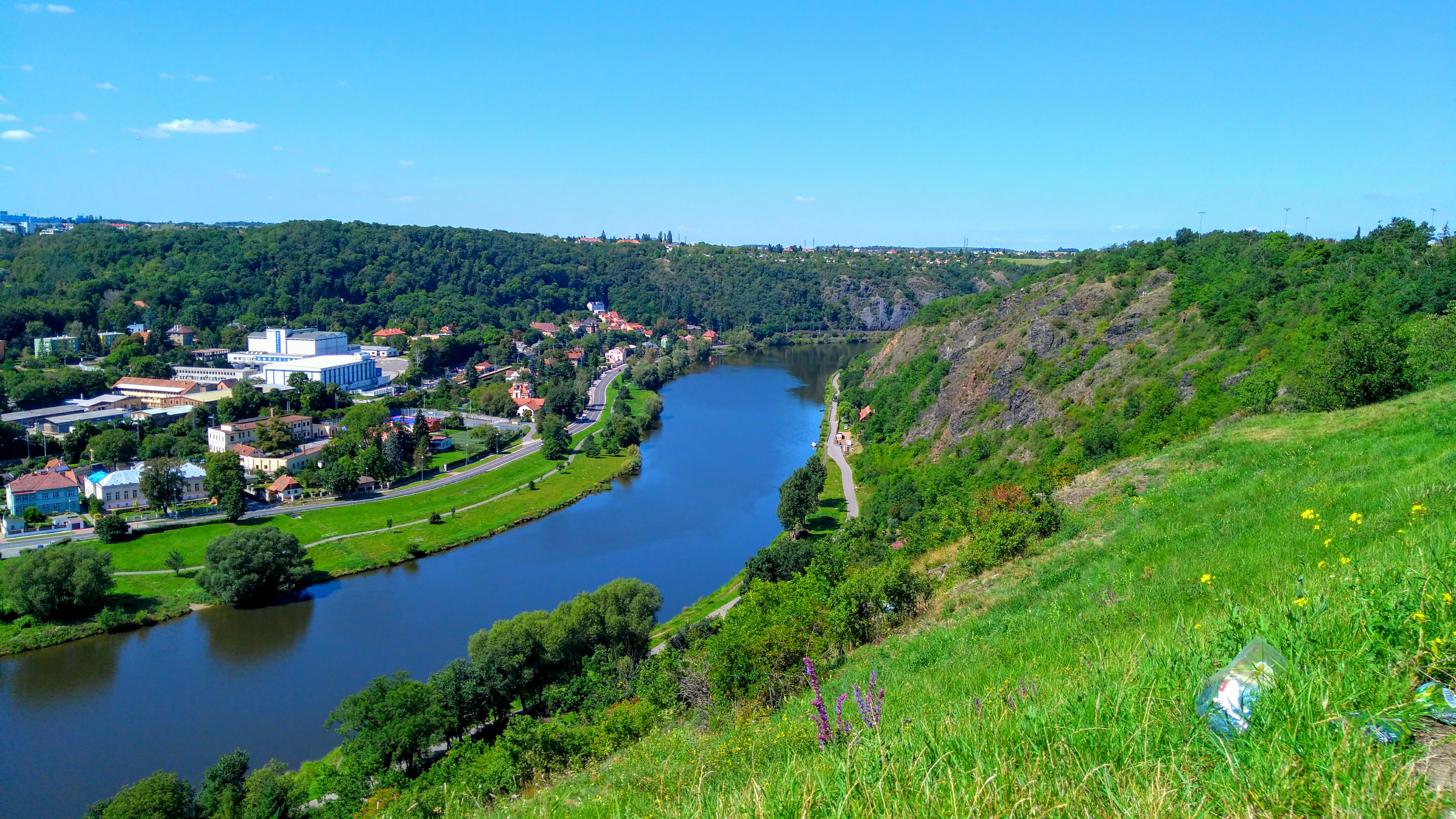
Vltava from Bohnice viewing point

The Vltava originates by a confluence of two rivers, the Teplá Vltava, which is longer, and the Studená Vltava, originating in Bavaria. From a water management point of view, the Vltava and Teplá Vltava are one river with single numbering of river kilometres. The Teplá Vltava originates in the territory of Kvilda in the Bohemian Forest at an elevation of 1,174 m (3,852 ft), on the slope of the Černá hora mountain. Together with the Teplá Vltava, the Vltava is 431.3 kilometres (268.0 mi) long. Without the Teplá Vltava, the Vltava is 377.0 kilometres (234.3 mi) long. The river flows north across Bohemia, through Český Krumlov, České Budějovice and Prague. It merges with the Elbe River at Mělník at an elevation of 156 m (512 ft). The height difference from source to mouth is 1,018 metres (3,340 ft).

The Vltava River drains an area of 28,089.9 square kilometres (10,845.6 sq mi) in size, over half of Bohemia and about a third of the Czech Republic's entire territory. The waters ultimately drain to the North Sea.

As it runs through Prague, the river is crossed by 21 bridges. The water from the river was used for drinking until 1912 when the Vinohrady Water Tower ceased pumping operations, and is now a place to view the city. It is, however, the source of drinking water in case of failures of or repairs to the water supply from the Želivka and Kárané sources. The Podolí water processing plant is on standby for such cases with the long section of the river upstream of the Podolí plant under the stricter, second degree of pollution prevention regulations.

Along its course, the river receives many tributaries. The longest tributaries of the Vltava are:

Tributary	Length (km)	River km	Side
Berounka	244.6	63.4	left
Sázava	225.9	78.3	right
Lužnice	197.9	202.2	right
Otava	134.8	169.1	left
Malše	96.0	240.0	right
Mastník	49.5	104.6	right
Kocába	47.7	82.8	left
Bakovský potok	44.6	13.7	left
Bezdrevský potok	43.1	231.0	left
Rokytka	37.2	47.4	right
Botič	33.8	55.2	right
Polečnice	32.8	281.3	left
Křemžský potok	31.8	258.5	left

From a strict hydrological point of view, it is the Elbe upstream of Mělník that is a tributary of the Vltava rather than the other way around, owing to the Vltava's longer distance upstream (434 km or 270 mi against 294 km or 183 mi of the Elbe), greater discharge, and larger drainage basin; however, since at the confluence point the Elbe flows through the main valley in a straight line, relative to which the Vltava flows at a right angle, the combined river downstream is identified as the Elbe for historical reasons. Had the combined river been identified as the Vltava in line with the hydrological convention, it would be 1,252 km or 778 mi long.

== Navigation ==
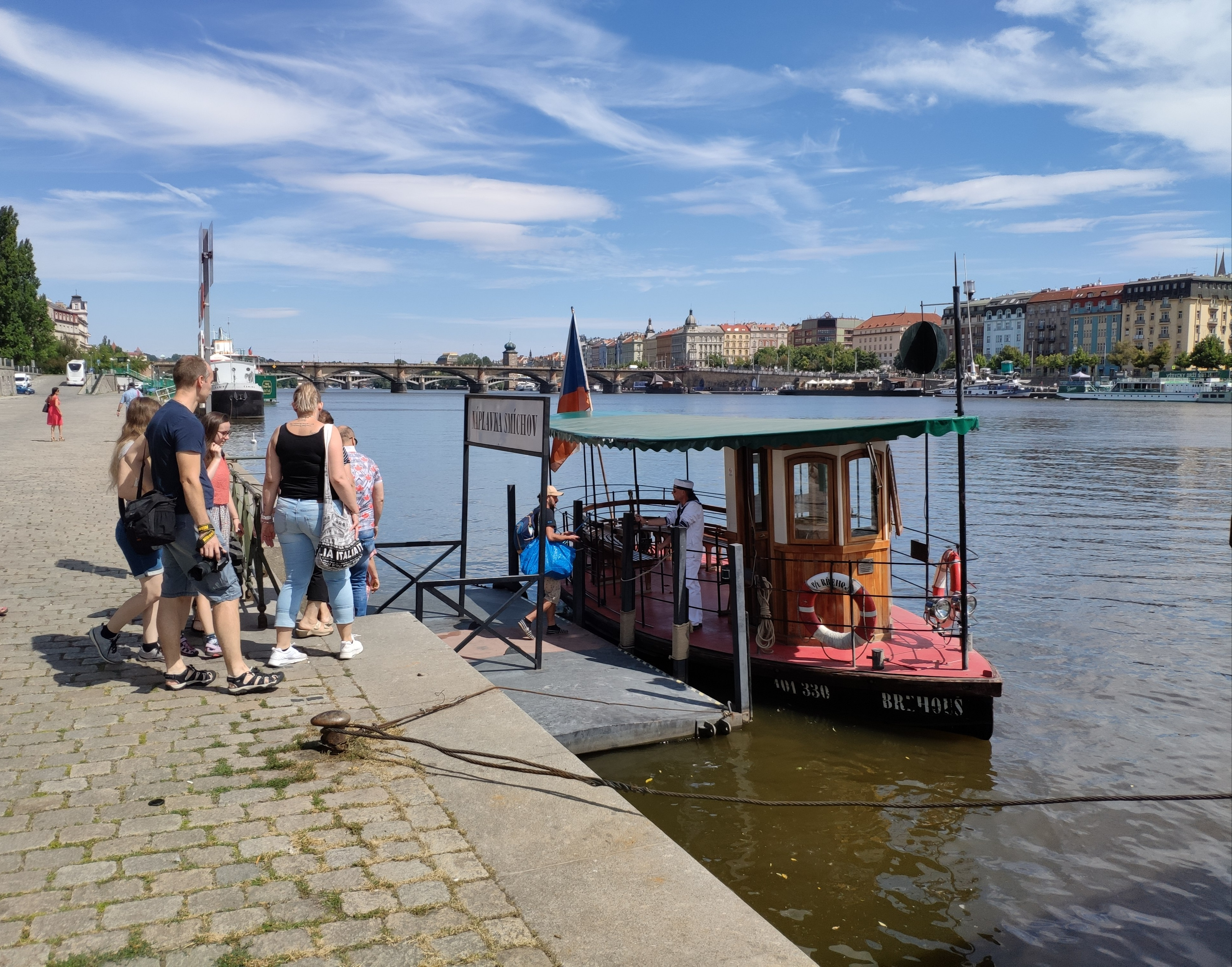
"Náplavka Smíchov" ferry dock in Prague

Between the confluence with the Elbe at Mělník and Prague, the river is navigable by vessels of up to 1,000 tonnes (980 long tons; 1,100 short tons) displacement. Most of the river upstream of Prague as far as České Budějovice is navigable by craft of up to 300 tonnes (300 long tons; 330 short tons) displacement, but such vessels cannot pass the dams at Orlík and Slapy, and are also restricted by a low bridge at Týn nad Vltavou. Work is planned to complete boat lifts, planned for but never completed, at the two dams, and to rebuild the bridge, in order for sizable watercraft to navigate throughout. Much smaller craft, of up to 3.5 tonnes (3.4 long tons; 3.9 short tons) displacement and under 3 metres (9.8 ft) beam and 3 metres (9.8 ft) air draft, can avoid these obstacles.

Upstream of České Budějovice, the river's section around Český Krumlov (specifically from Vyšší Brod to Boršov nad Vltavou) is a very popular destination for water tourism.

== Dams ==
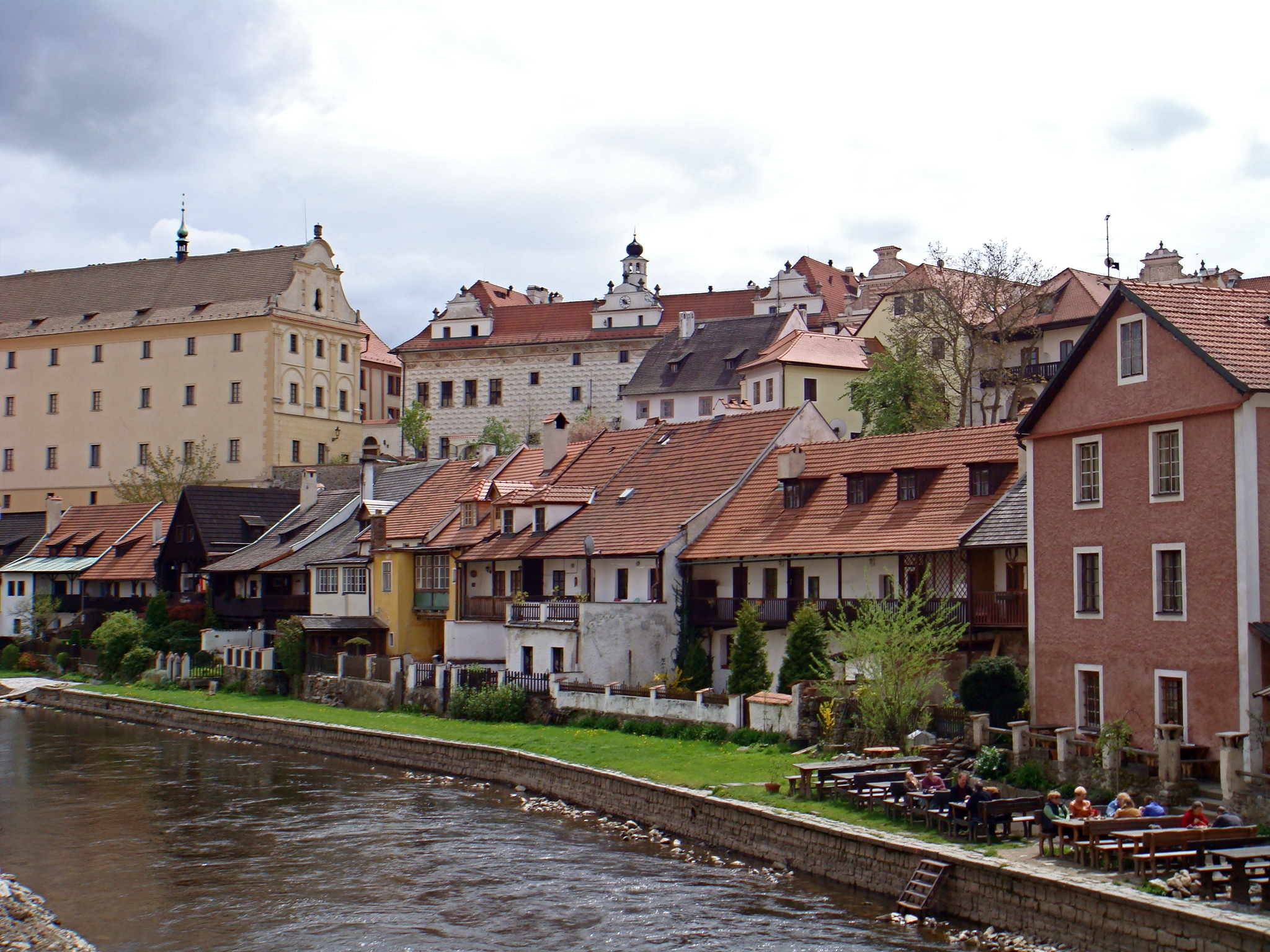
Historic Centre of Český Krumlov near the Vltava River

Nine hydroelectric dams have been built since the 1930s on the Vltava south of Prague to regulate the water flow and generate hydroelectric power. Beginning at the headwaters, the reservoirs created by these dams are: the Lipno, Lipno II, Hněvkovice, Kořensko, Orlík, Kamýk, Slapy, Štěchovice and Vrané. The Orlík Reservoir supports the largest reservoir on the Vltava by volume, while the Lipno Reservoir retains the largest reservoir by area. The Štěchovice Reservoir is built over the site of St John's Rapids.

The river also features numerous weirs that help mitigate its flow from 1,172 metres (3,845 ft) in elevation at its source near the German border to 155 metres (509 ft) at its mouth in Mělník.

== Floods ==
The Vltava basin has flooded multiple times throughout recorded history. Markers have been created along the banks denoting the water line for notable floods in 1784, 1845, 1890, 1940, and the highest of all in 2002.

In August 2002, the basin was heavily affected by the 2002 European floods when the flooded river killed several people and caused massive damage and disruption along its length, including in Prague. It left the oldest bridge in Prague, Charles Bridge, seriously weakened, requiring years of work to repair.

Prague was again flooded in 2013. Many locations within the Vltava and Elbe basins were left under water, including the Prague Zoo, but metal barriers were erected along the banks of the Vltava to help protect the historic city centre.

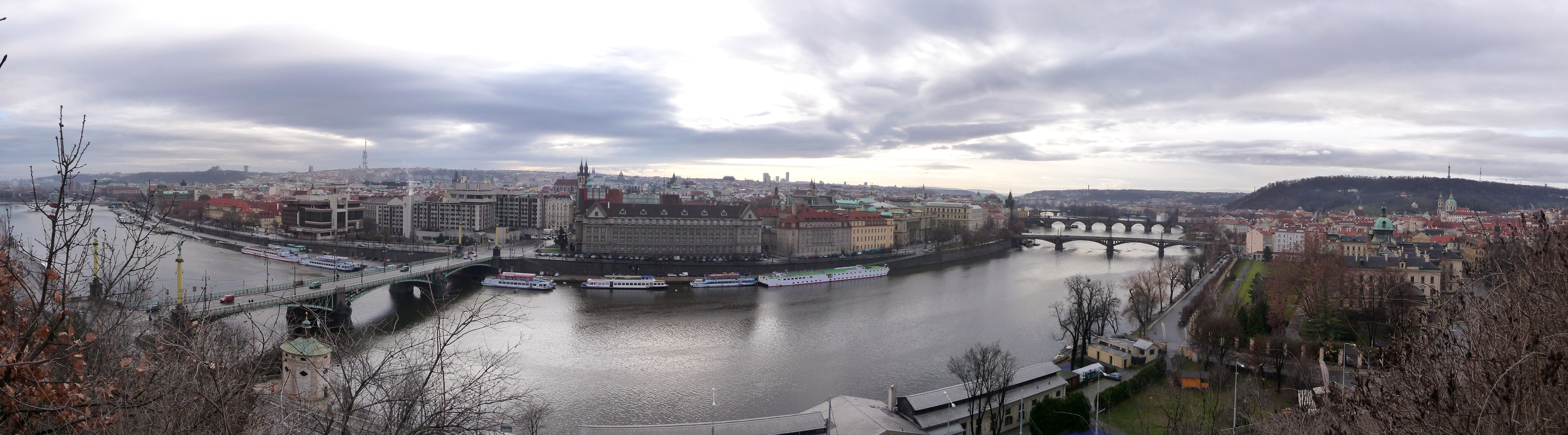
The Vltava as it flows along the north side of central Prague, taken from the Stalin Monument socle in Letná Park

== References in culture and science ==
In the classic narrative of the golem in Jewish folklore, the mystic Judah Loew ben Bezalel made the artificial giant "out of clay from the banks of the Vltava River and brought it to life through rituals and Hebrew incantations to defend the Prague ghetto from antisemitic attacks and pogroms."

One of the best-known works of classical music by a Czech composer is Bedřich Smetana's Vltava, sometimes called The Moldau in English. It is from the Romantic era of classical music and is a musical description of the river's course through Bohemia.

Smetana's symphonic poem also inspired a song of the same name by Bertolt Brecht. An English version of it, by John Willett, features the lyrics Deep down in the Moldau the pebbles are shifting / In Prague three dead emperors moulder away.

The Vltava River has been used as the setting for a number of films, including the 1942 Czech drama The Great Dam. More recently, the Vltava has been used as a film location for such films as Amadeus in 1984 and Mission: Impossible in 1996. The river also appeared in the 2002 film xXx. During filming, Vin Diesel's stunt double, Harry O'Connor, was tragically killed when he parasailed into the Palacký Bridge while filming an action sequence.

A minor planet, 2123 Vltava, discovered in 1973 by Soviet astronomer Nikolai Stepanovich Chernykh, is named after the river.

== See also ==
- Moldavite
