= Karel Pippich =

Czech lawyer (1849–1921)

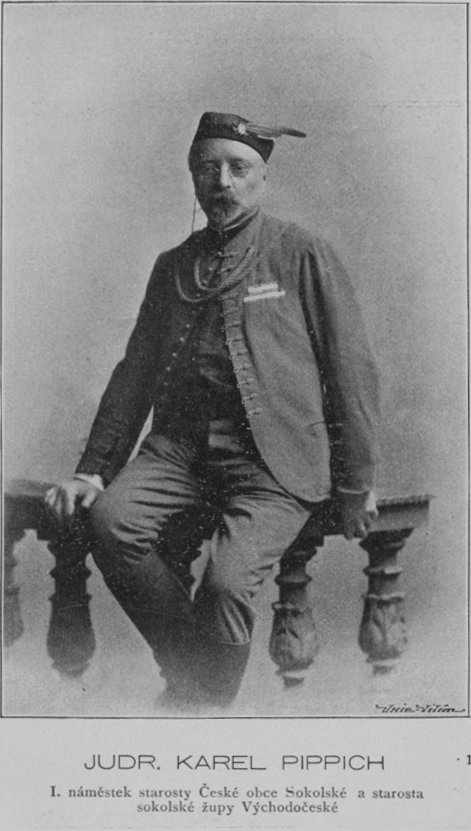
Karel Pippich in 1901

Karel Pippich (21 April 1849 in Zlonice – 29 March 1921 in Chrudim) was a Czech lawyer, Sokol organizer and writer.

== Works ==
- Vlasty skon: Dramatická báseň o třech jednáních, určená pro drama (1885) - this drama, "The Death of Vlasta", is connected to the myths of Vlasta, Libuše's handmaid and Šárka, the mythical warrior-maiden of Bohemia, a character in The Maidens' War. The drama was first offered as the basis of an opera to Dvořák, who initially showed interest but later turned it down, and Pippich offered it to a pupil of Fibich, Otakar Ostrčil who created the opera The Death of Vlasta in 1903.
