= Křížovice =

- Village
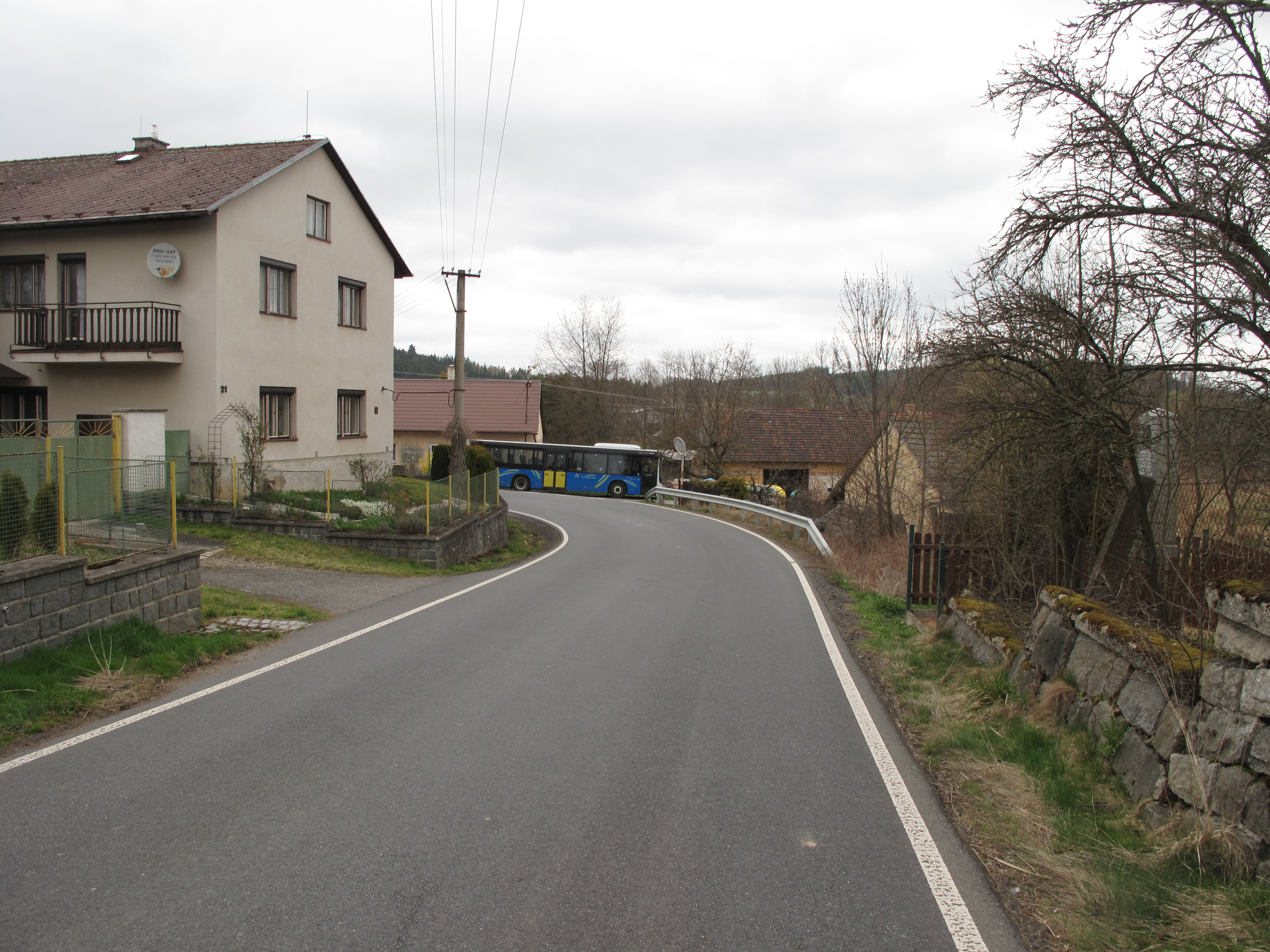
- Main road

- Location in the Czech Republic
- Coordinates: 49°21′39″N 13°26′28″E
- Country: Czech Republic
- Region: Plzeň
- District: Klatovy
- Municipality: Plánice
- First mentioned: 1551

Area
  - Total: 3.28 km^{2} (1.27 sq mi)

Population (2021)
  - Total: 52
  - Density: 16/km^{2} (41/sq mi)
- Time zone: UTC+1 (CET)
  - Summer (DST): UTC+2 (CEST)
- Postal code: 340 34

Křížovice is a village and administrative part of Plánice in Klatovy District in the Plzeň Region of the Czech Republic. It has about 50 inhabitants. It is located in the southwestern part of the municipal territory.

== History ==
The first written mention of Křížovice is from 1551.

== Gallery ==
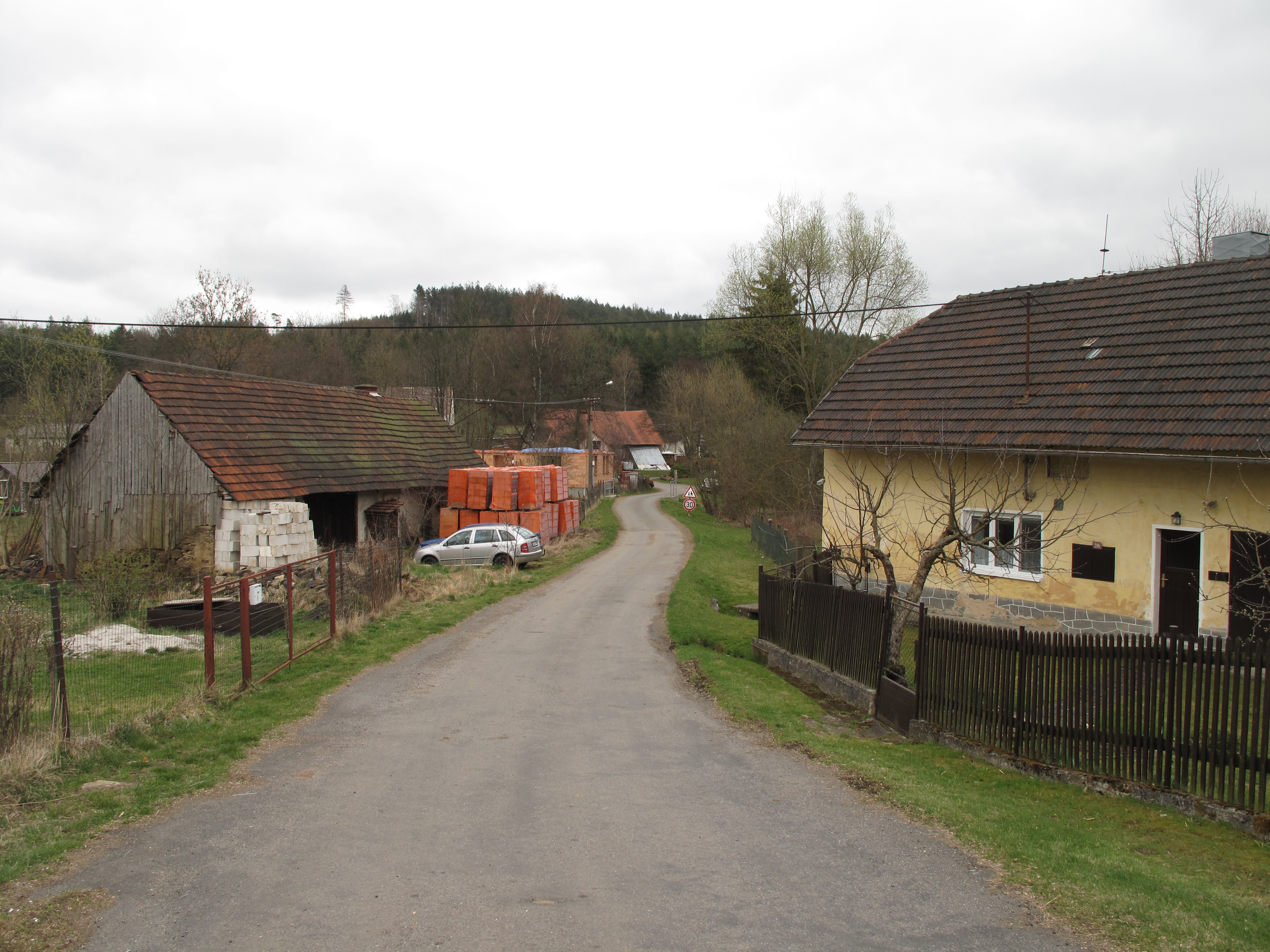
Side street

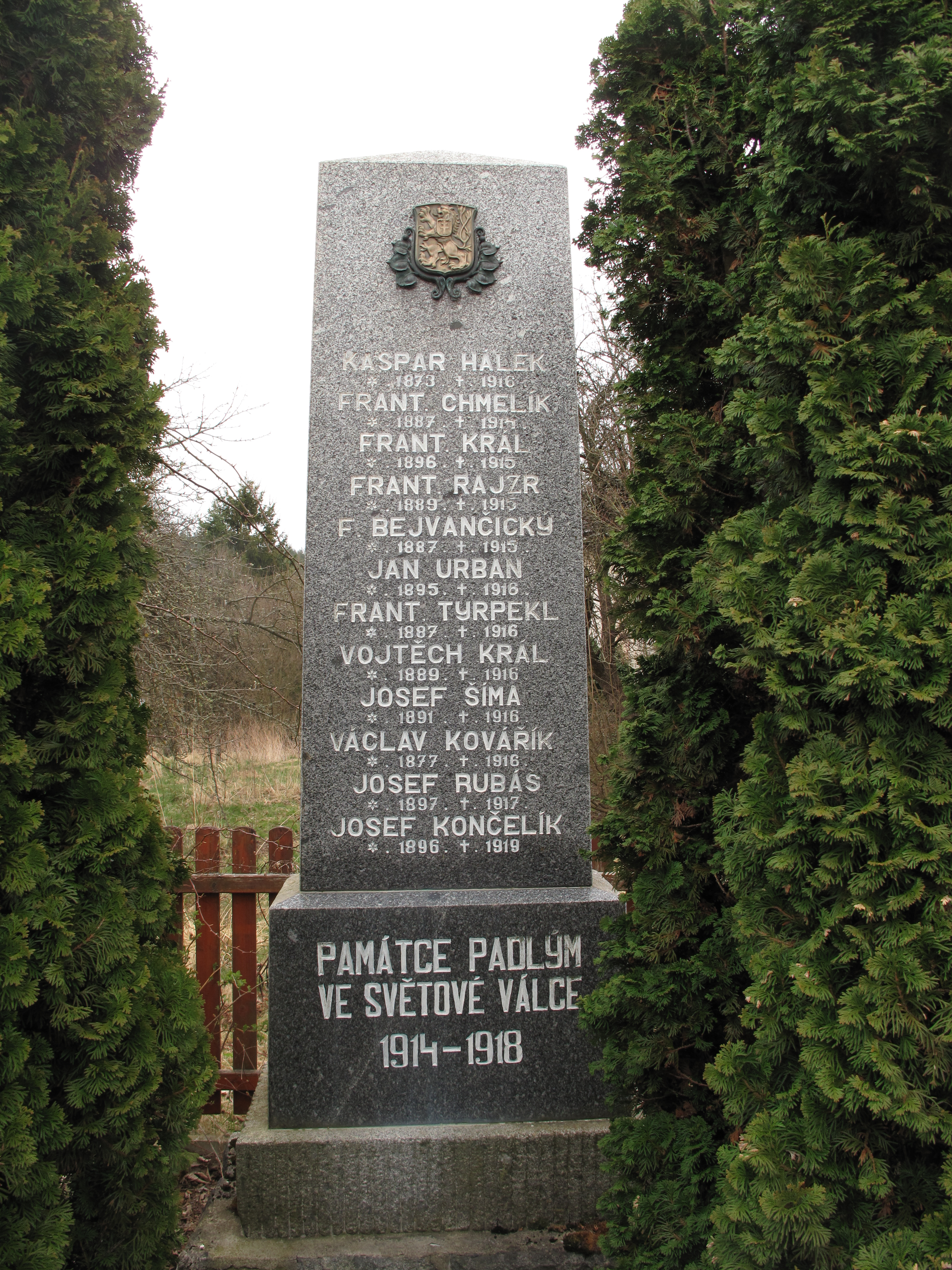
World War I Memorial

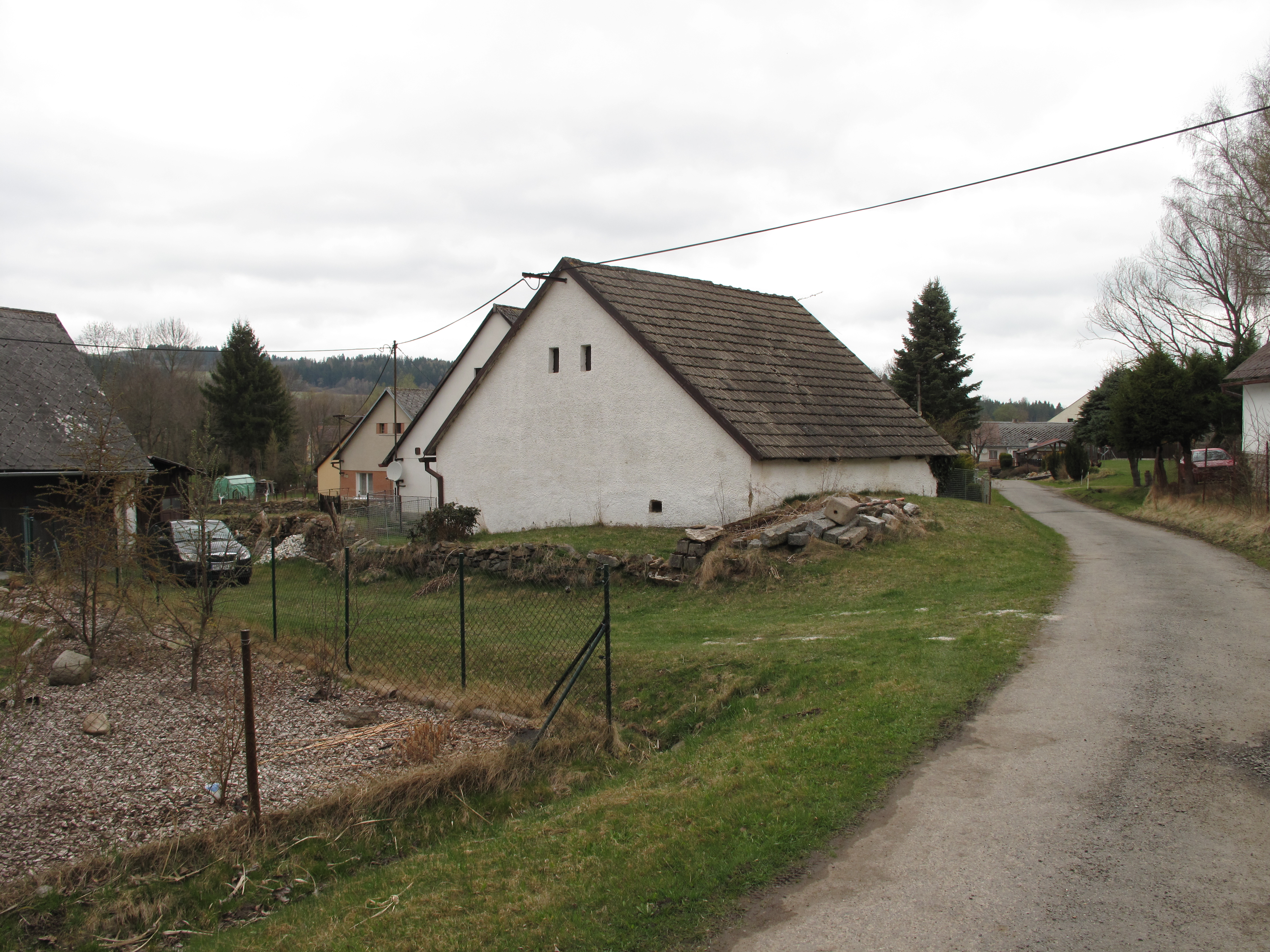
Houses
