= Otakar Hostinský =

Czech historian, musicologist, and professor of musical aesthetics (1847-1910)

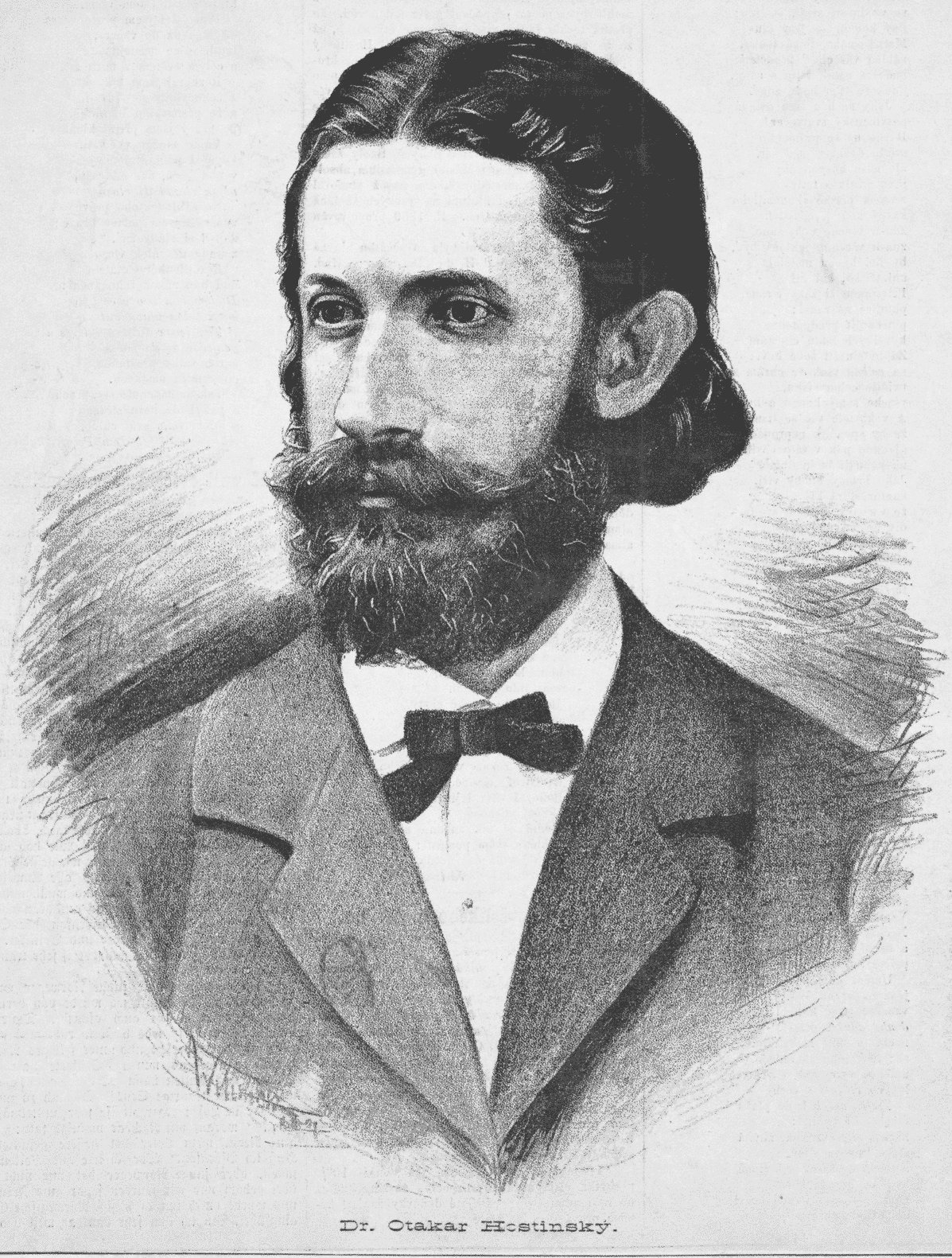
Otakar Hostinský.

Otakar Hostinský (2 January 1847, Martiněves – 19 January 1910, Prague) was a Czech historian, musicologist, and professor of musical aesthetics. He is known primarily for his support of composer Bedřich Smetana and his contributions to Czech aesthetic theory, which influenced many cultural figures in early twentieth-century Prague, including Zdeněk Nejedlý, Otakar Zich, and Vladimír Helfert. He also wrote the opera librettos to Zdeněk Fibich's masterpiece, The Bride of Messina, and Josef Richard Rozkošný's Cinderella.

== Biography ==
Born in Bohemia, Otakar Hostinský studied in Munich and Prague, obtaining his doctorate in 1869. Hostinský worked as a journalist and an editor before working as a tutor for noble families for a few years.

In Prague, Hostinský was a professor at the Academy of Fine Arts, the Prague Conservatory, and the Academy of Arts, Architecture and Design.

Hostinský taught musical aesthetics and musical history at Charles University, where he made significant contributions before his death in 1910.

== Selected writings ==
(German titles given in the original; Czech titles translated into English)

- Art and Nationality, 1869
- Wagnerianism and Czech National Identity, 1870
- On "Program" Music, 1873
- Das Musikalisch-Schöne und das Gesammtkunstwerk vom Standpuncte der formalen Aesthetik, 1877
- Die Lehre von den musikalischen Klängen, 1879
- On the Contemporary State and Direction of Czech Music, 1880
- On Czech Musical Declamation, 1882
- On Melodrama, 1885
- A Brief Overview of the History of Music, 1885
- On Artistic Realism, 1890
- Herbarts Ästhetik, 1891
- Volkslied und Tanz der Slaven, 1893
- On Progress in Art, 1894
- On Folksong, 1897
- On Experimental Aesthetics, 1900
- B. Smetana and his Struggle for Modern Czech Music, 1901
- On the Socialization of Art, 1903
- Art and Society, 1907
- Czech Music, 1864-1904, 1909
