= The Death of Vlasta =

The Death of Vlasta (Czech: Vlasty skon) is a 1903 opera by Otakar Ostrčil. The story concerns Vlasta, leader of warriors in The Maidens' War legend and is connected to the subject matter of Smetana's Libuše and Fibich's Šárka (and later Janáček's Šárka).

Karel Pippich, author of the drama Vlasty skon: Dramatická báseň o třech jednáních, určená pro drama (1885), first offered the story to Antonín Dvořák, but he declined, so it was later accepted by Fibich's pupil Ostrčil.

The opera was only performed six times.

== Recordings ==
- Aria from Act 2 - "Aria of Vojmír to Vlasta", LP (1984); sung by bass Ivan Kusnjer
