= Otakar Zich =

Czech composer and aesthetician (1879–1934)

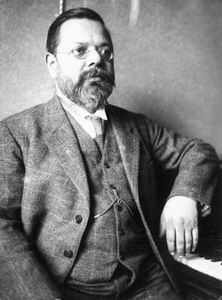
Otakar Zich

Otakar Zich (25 March 1879 – 9 July 1934) was a Czech composer and aesthetician.

== Biography ==
Zich was born on 25 March 1879 in Městec Králové. In his music education he studied as a self-taught man. Years later, he became a pupil of the prominent nineteenth-century Czech aesthetician Otakar Hostinský, and a protégé of the iconoclastic musicologist and critic Zdeněk Nejedlý. In the years 1903–1906 he taught physics and mathematics at the High School in Domažlice. In the years leading up to the First World War Zich lived in Prague, actively participating in musical life as a critic. In this capacity he supported the efforts of Nejedlý's pro-Smetana faction against the intellectual descendants of Antonín Dvořák, especially during the so-called Dvořák Affair of 1911–1914, when he called into question the artistic integrity of Dvořák's compositional language. These activities firmly allied Zich with Nejedlý's academic circle at Charles University, where, in 1924, he was appointed professor of Aesthetics. He held this position until his death. He died on 9 July 1934 in Ouběnice (today part of Bystřice).

== Style ==
As a composer, Zich was largely self-taught, although he can be said to belong to the post-Smetana lineage of Czech composers (which includes Zdeněk Fibich, Josef Bohuslav Foerster, and Otakar Ostrčil, all connected in some way to Nejedlý). His main contributions to concert life in Prague were the operas Malířský nápad (The Artist's Idea, 1908), Vina (Guilt, 1915), and Preciézky (on Zich's own translation of Molière's Les précieuses ridicules, 1924). He also created several solo vocal and choral compositions. His musical style straddles the divide between late Romanticism and early neo-classicism, combining dense orchestration, Wagnerian leitmotifs, and an intensely linear counterpoint with a playful referentiality to past styles. With the exception of Preciézky and a few individual shorter works, most of Zich's music remains unpublished.

Because of his association with Nejedlý, performances of Zich's music often met with bitter controversy in interwar Prague, where critics assessed new compositions based on factional allegiances. The lowest point of this was undoubtedly the premiere of Vina in 1922, which the arch-conservative critic Antonín Šilhan attacked in a vituperative article entitled Finis musicae (The End of Music). Šilhan's argument focused primarily on the opera's orchestral score, where the counterpoint occasionally borders on atonality.

Zich was also the author of many folkloric studies and books on aesthetics: foremost among these are Estetické vnímaní hudby (The Aesthetic Perception of Music, 1911) and Estetika dramatického umění (The Aesthetics of Drama, 1931). In each of these he explored the application of phenomenology, derived from the work of Hegel and Husserl, to branches of the performing arts, and his theories are still the subject of debate in present-day Czech academic circles. As a musicologist he also devoted himself to the study of Smetana's life and works, with numerous analytical articles appearing in Czech-language music journals.

== Selected works ==
Songs

- Písně a písničky I., II. (Songs I., II.) (1900–1906)
- Ze srdce (From Heart), Op. 4 (1906–1907)
- Matičce (To Mother), Op. 8
- Stará balada (Old Ballad) (1909)
- Z mělnické skály (From the Mělník's Rock), Op. 16 (1909)
- Dušičky (Little Souls) (1922)
- Střepiny dnů (Fragments of the Days), Op. 13 (1926–1927)
- Dvacet pět chodských lidových písní (Twenty-five Folk Songs from Chodsko Region) (1905–1906)

Male choirs

- Balada tříkrálová (Ballad of the Three Kings), Op. 9a (1911)
- Píseň poutníka (A Wanderer's Song), Op. 9b (1912)
- Princezna Lyoleja (Princess Lyoleia), Op. 9c (1913)
- Podzimní motiv (An Autumn Motif), Op. 18a (1932)
- Slzičky (Little Tears), Op. 18b (1905)
- Kosmická píseň (Cosmic Song), Op. 18c (1931)
- Hajdaláci (Slovens), Op. 18d (1918)
- Rodná zem (Homeland), Op. 20a (1929)
- Zazděná (Immured), Op. 20b (1929)
- Janu Nerudovi (To Jan Neruda), Op. 20c (1934)
- Třicet šest vojenských písní (Thirty-six Military Songs) (1924)
- Pět lidových písní (Five Folk Songs) (1933)
- Forman (Carman) (1934)

Female choirs

- Tři ženské sbory (Three Female Choirs), Op. 17
- Tři chodské písně (Three Folk Songs From Chodsko Region) (1909)

Mixed choirs

- Modlitba na Řípu (A Prayer on Říp) (1905)
- Urá (Hooray), Op. 15a (1929)
- Vajanské vatry (Bonfires of Vojany), Op. 11 (1921)
- Dva čtyřzpěvy (Two Choirs for Four Voices), Op. 19 (1932–1933)
- Tři chodské písně (Three Folk Songs From Chodsko Region) (1904)

Cantata

- Osudná svatba (Fateful Marriage), Op. 1 (1917)
- Pátý hrobeček (Fifth Grave), Op. 2 (1906)
- Zimní balada (Winter Ballad), Op. 3 (1906)
- Polka jede, Op. 5 (1907)

Melodrama

- Romance o Černém jezeře (Romance about the Black Lake), Op. 6 (1907)

Opera

- Malířský nápad (The Artist's Idea), Op. 7 (1908)
- Vina (Guilt), Op. 10 (1911–1915)
- Preciézky, Op. 12 (1922–1924)

Chamber

- Česká suita (Czech Suite), Op. 14 (1928)
- String Trio in E minor, Op. 1a (1930)
- Piano Trio in E minor (1899–1902)
- Chodská suita (Chod Suite, for octet or nonet), Op. 3a (1905)

Orchestral

- Overture Konrad Wallenrod, Op. 2a (1903)
- Zaváďky (Starodávné Lidové Tance Hanácké), pro malý orchestr (Ancient Folk Dances of the Haná Region, for chamber orchestra)
