= Záboj =

Invented national hero of the Czech past

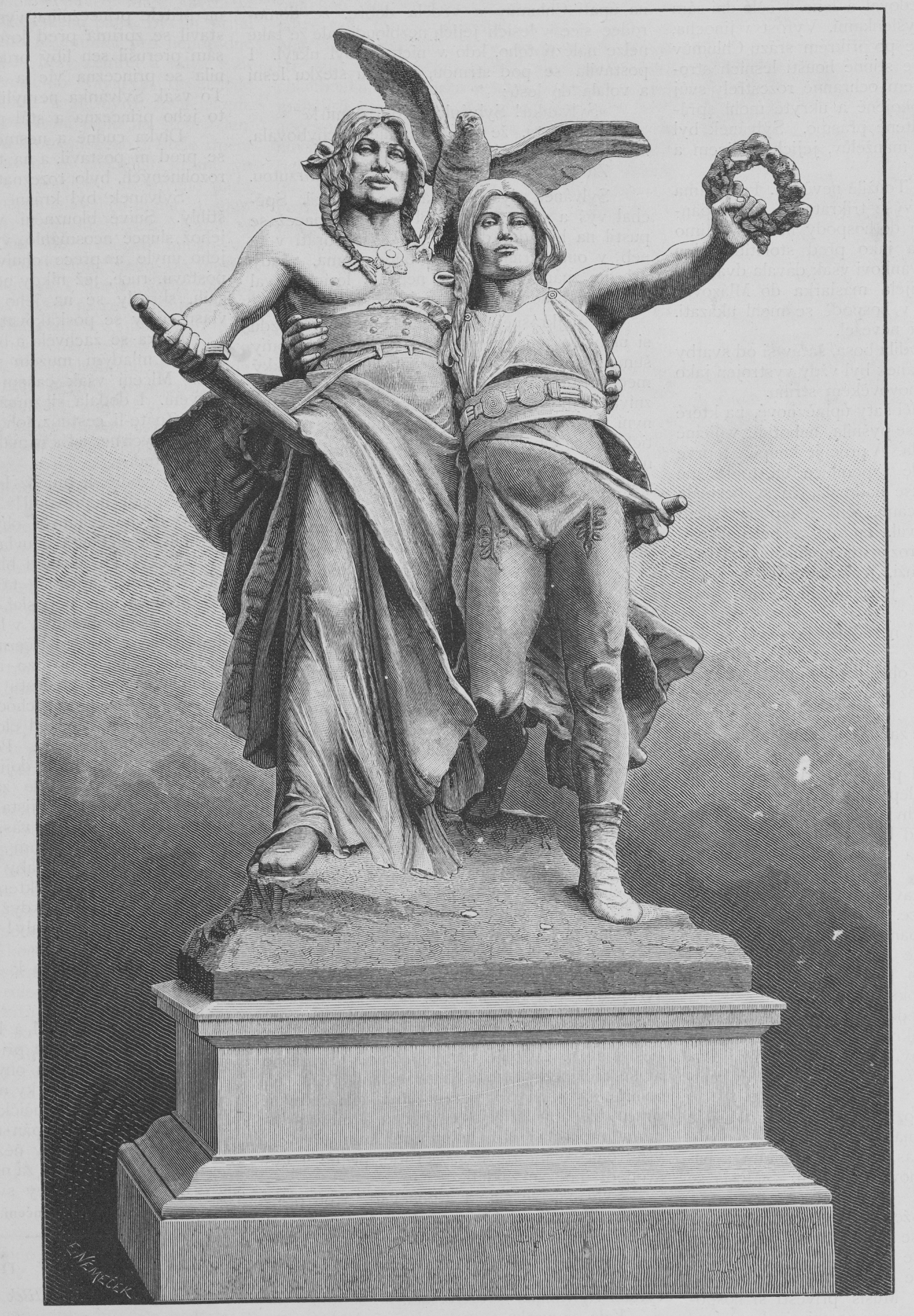
Sketch of statues of Záboj and Slavoj (1895) on the Palacký Bridge in Prague

Záboj and Slavoj are two invented national heroes of the Czech past, two minstrel-warriors. They are found in Václav Hanka's spurious medieval Manuscript of Dvůr Kralové, allegedly "discovered" in 1817 in the tower of a local church and not exposed as a literary hoax, by Jan Gebauer in Masaryk's journal Athenaeum, until 1886.

== Cultural legacy ==
- Záboj (completed 1859) is an unstaged opera written by the music critic Josef Leopold Zvonař for the opening of a Czech national opera, but never performed. The plot follows the exploits of the legendary hero Záboj from the Manuscript of Dvůr Králové. Bedřich Smetana, a friend of Zvonař, conducted two extracts to some success, and Záboj's Act 1 aria - exhorting the men of Bohemia to stand against the enemy - was recorded by Ivan Kusnjer for a Panton LP in 1984.
- The first symphonic poem in Czech was Zdeněk Fibich's Op. 37, Záboj, Slavoj a Ludĕk, symfonická básen. (1873);
- Discovery of the hoax did not prevent unveiling of statues by Josef Václav Myslbek in 1895 as one of four legendary groups on the Palacký Bridge in Prague. The four pairs of statues were later moved to the Vyšehrad.
- Záboj (premiere 1918), a second opera of the same name, was composed by Emanuel Chvála to a poem by Jaroslav Vrchlický.
