= Chvála =

Chvála (feminine: Chválová) is a Czech surname, meaning 'praise'. Notable people with the surname include:

- Charles Chvala (born 1954), American businessman and politician
- Emanuel Chvála (1851–1924), Czech composer and music critic
- Milan Chvála (1936–2021), Czech entomologist
