= Martiněves =

- Municipality
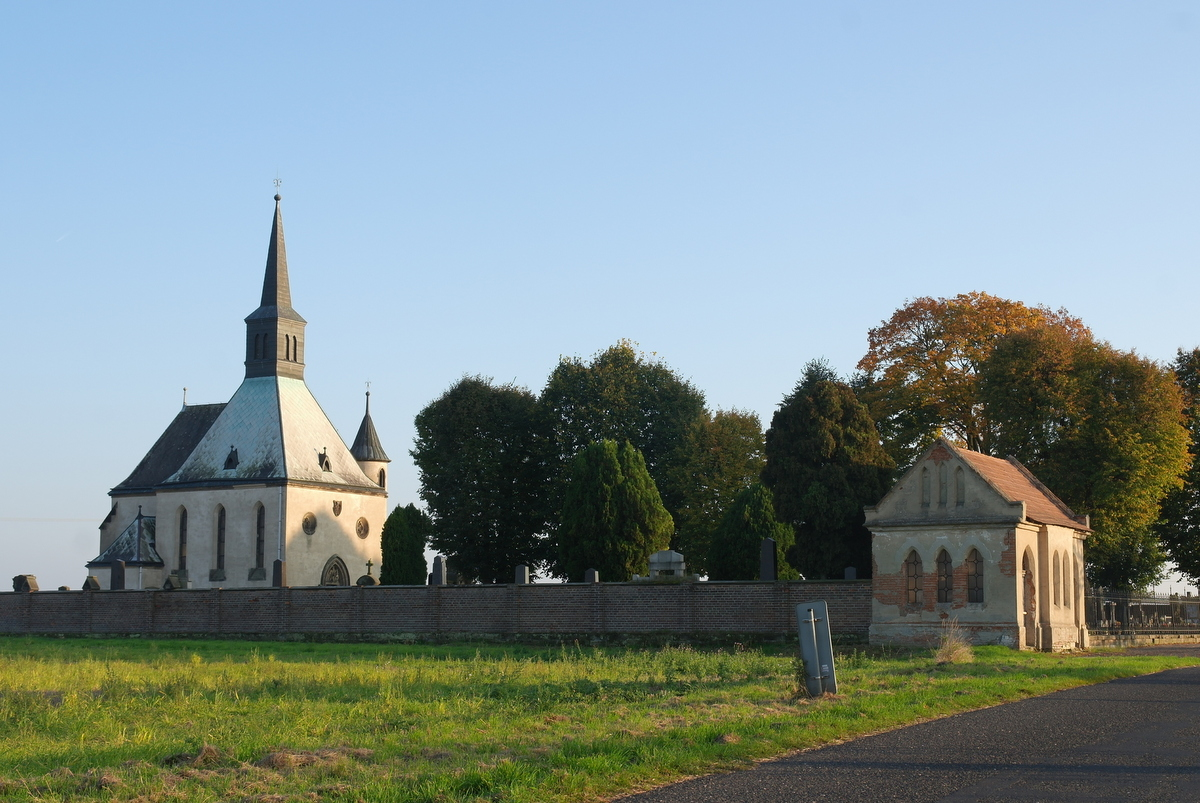
- Cemetery and Chapel of Saint Procopius

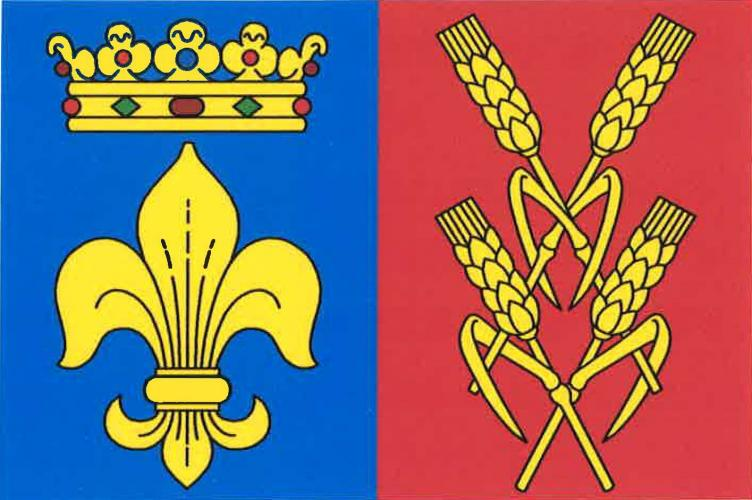
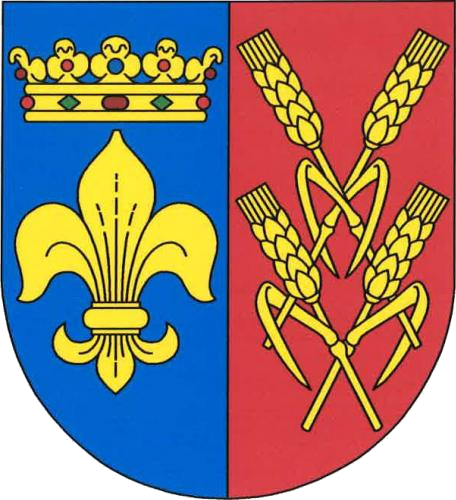
- Flag Coat of arms

- Location in the Czech Republic
- Coordinates: 50°22′22″N 14°9′10″E
- Country: Czech Republic
- Region: Ústí nad Labem
- District: Litoměřice
- First mentioned: 1226

Area
  - Total: 20.14 km^{2} (7.78 sq mi)
- Elevation: 256 m (840 ft)

Population (2026-01-01)
  - Total: 823
  - Density: 40.9/km^{2} (106/sq mi)
- Time zone: UTC+1 (CET)
  - Summer (DST): UTC+2 (CEST)
- Postal code: 411 19
- Website: www.martineves.cz

Martiněves is a municipality and village in Litoměřice District in the Ústí nad Labem Region of the Czech Republic. It has about 800 inhabitants.

Martiněves lies approximately 19 kilometres (12 mi) south of Litoměřice, 34 km (21 mi) south of Ústí nad Labem, and 37 km (23 mi) north-west of Prague.

== Administrative division ==
Martiněves consists of four municipal parts (in brackets population according to the 2021 census):

- Martiněves (81)
- Charvatce (247)
- Pohořice (229)
- Radešín (243)

== Demographics ==
Historical population
Year	Pop.	±%
1869	1,327	—
1880	1,564	+17.9%
1890	1,677	+7.2%
1900	1,781	+6.2%
1910	1,720	−3.4%
1921	1,768	+2.8%
1930	1,657	−6.3%
1950	1,102	−33.5%
1961	1,028	−6.7%
1970	925	−10.0%
1980	795	−14.1%
1991	697	−12.3%
2001	686	−1.6%
2011	742	+8.2%
2021	800	+7.8%
Source: Censuses

== Notable people ==
- Otakar Hostinský (1847–1910), historian and musicologist
