= May Symphony =

Musical work composed by Vítězslav Novák

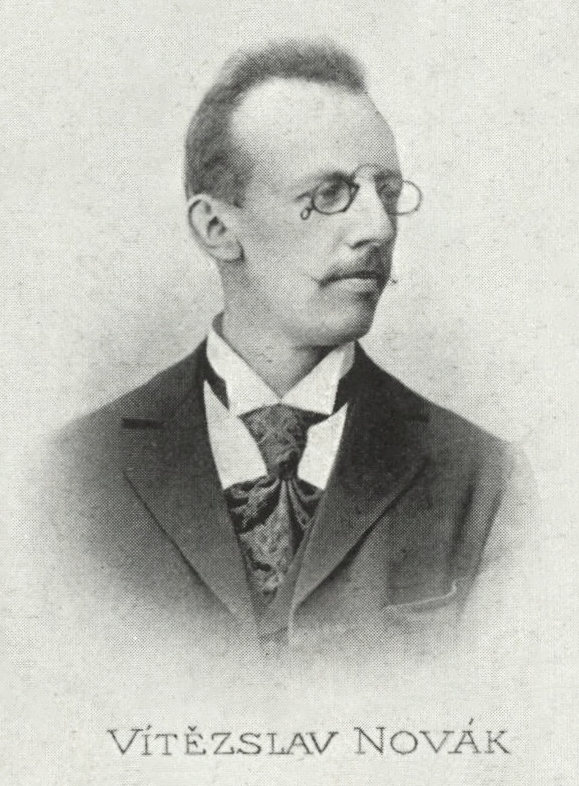
Vítězslav Novák in 1899

Vítězslav Novák's Májová symfonie, Op. 73 (May Symphony), also known as Jarní symfonie (Spring Symphony), was composed in 1943, during the German occupation of Czechoslovakia. It is a choral symphony based on Karel H. Mácha's 1836 poem May (Máj), Novák's second contribution to the genre after his 1934 Autumn Symphony.

Dedicated to Joseph Stalin as the liberator of Czechoslovakia, the symphony was premiered in Prague on 5 December 1945, seven months after the German defeat. It quotes both the Song of the Volga Boatman and Deutschlandlied.

== Structure ==
The composition consists of three movements:

1. Andante sostenuto
2. Andante
3. Alla marcia funebre

A typical performance takes around 60 minutes.
