= Emanuel Chvála =

Czech composer and music critic

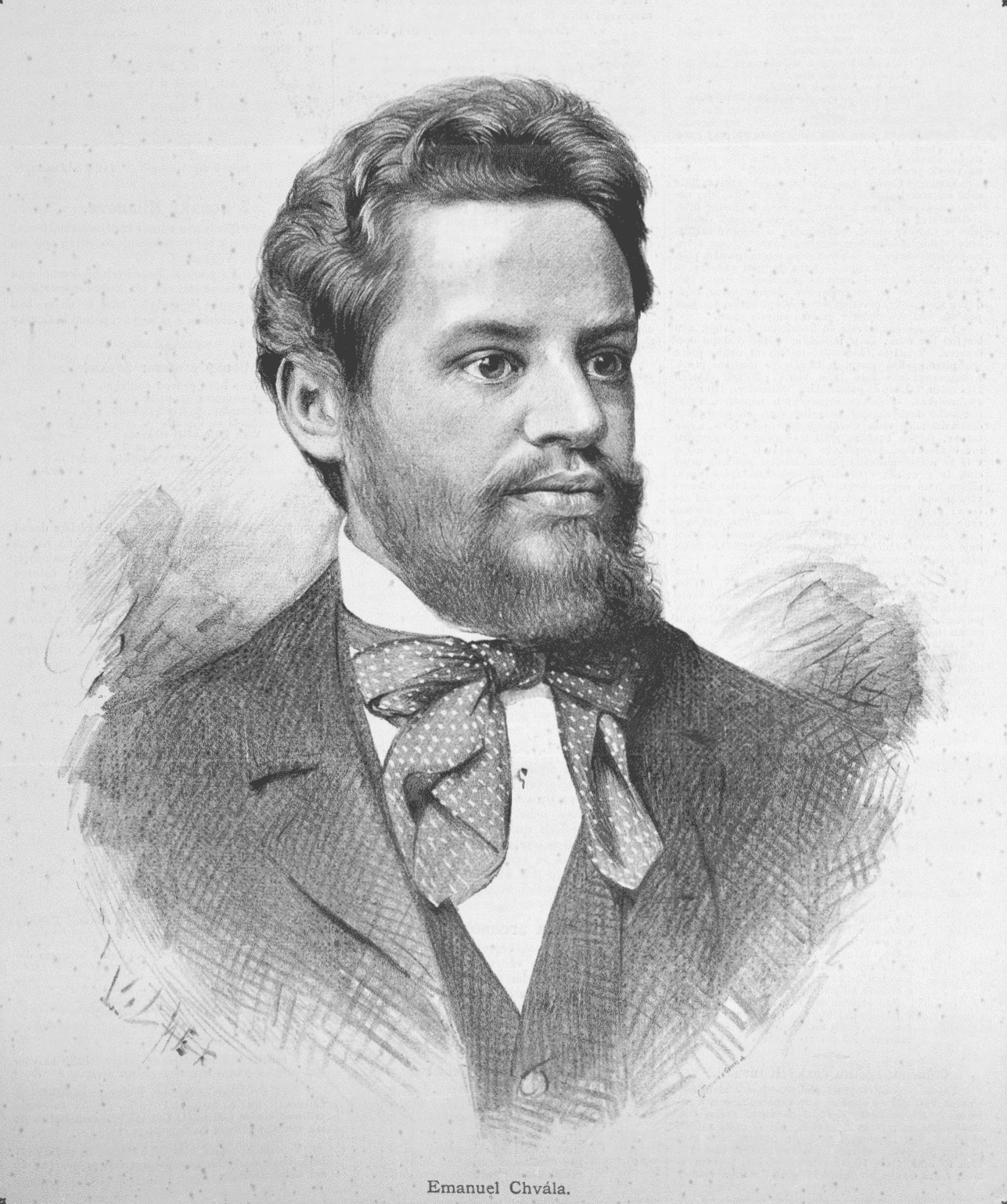
Emanuel Chvála (1889)

Emanuel Chvála (January 1, 1851 in Prague – October 28, 1924 in Prague) was a Czech composer and music critic. He studied engineering and worked all his life as a railway official in Prague. But he had also studied composition with Fibich and Josef Foerster, and began writing music criticism for the literary magazine Lumír in 1878. He also wrote for the daily newspapers Politik and Národní politika between 1880 and 1921 using the cypher ‘-la’. In his journalism he furthered the music of Dvořák, Fibich, Josef Suk and Vítězslav Novák.

== Works ==
- Záboj (1918), an opera to a poem by Jaroslav Vrchlický.
- O posvícení (1902), an orchestral poem describing the day of the kermis in a Czech village. (WP: 16. February 1902 by the Czech Philharmonic under Ludvík Čelanský)
