= Honzovo království =

1934 Czech opera

Honzovo království (Jack's Kingdom) is a 1934 Czech opera in 3 acts by Otakar Ostrčil to a libretto by Jiří Mařánek based on Tolstoy's short story "Tale of Ivan the Jester".

== Recordings ==
- Honzovo království complete Ivo Žídek, Jaroslava Vymazalová, Přemysl Kočí, Prague Symphony Orchestra, Václav Jiráček 1954, reissued Supraphon.
