= Josef Leopold Zvonař =

Czech composer, pedagogue, and music critic

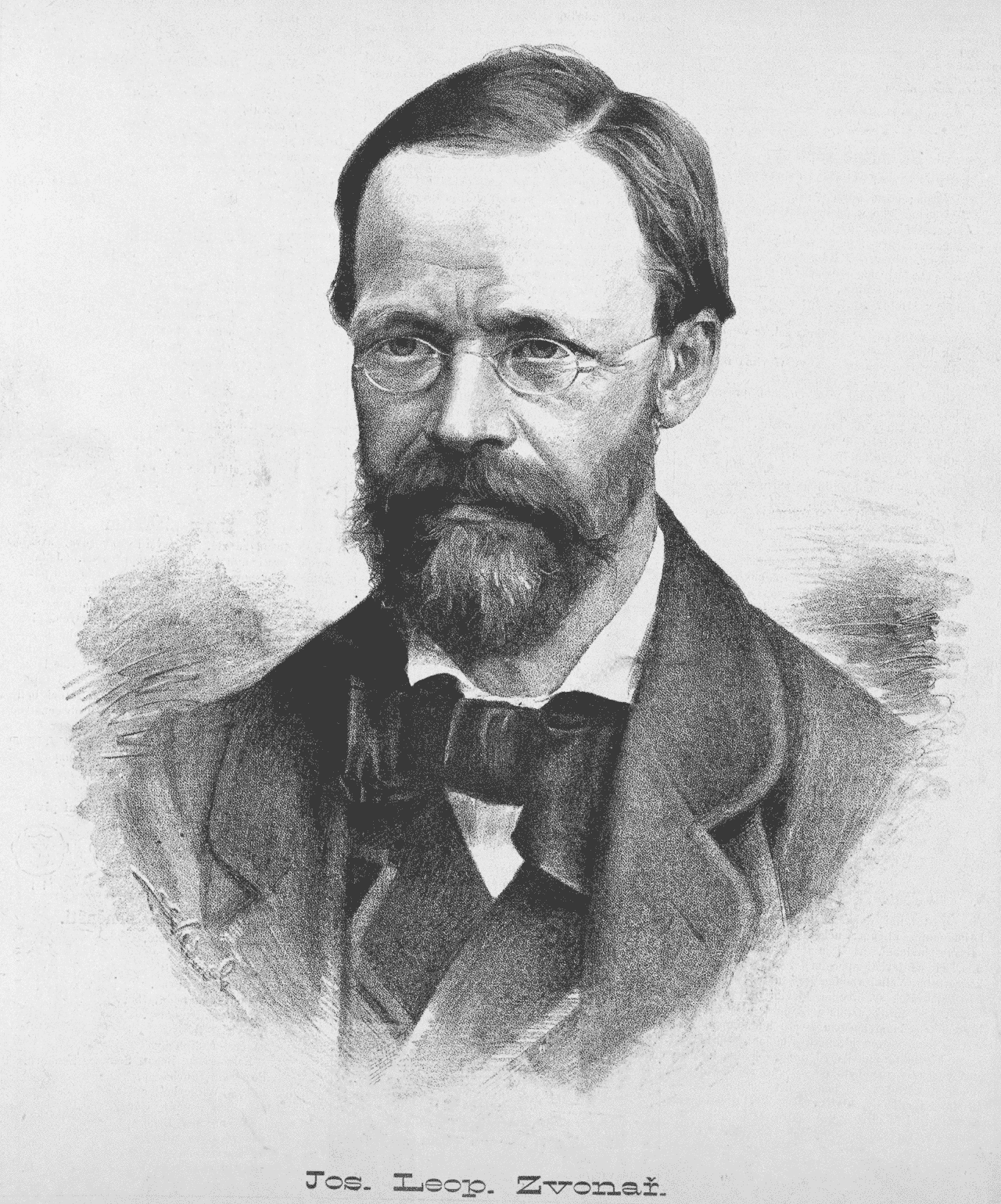
Josef Leopold Zvonař

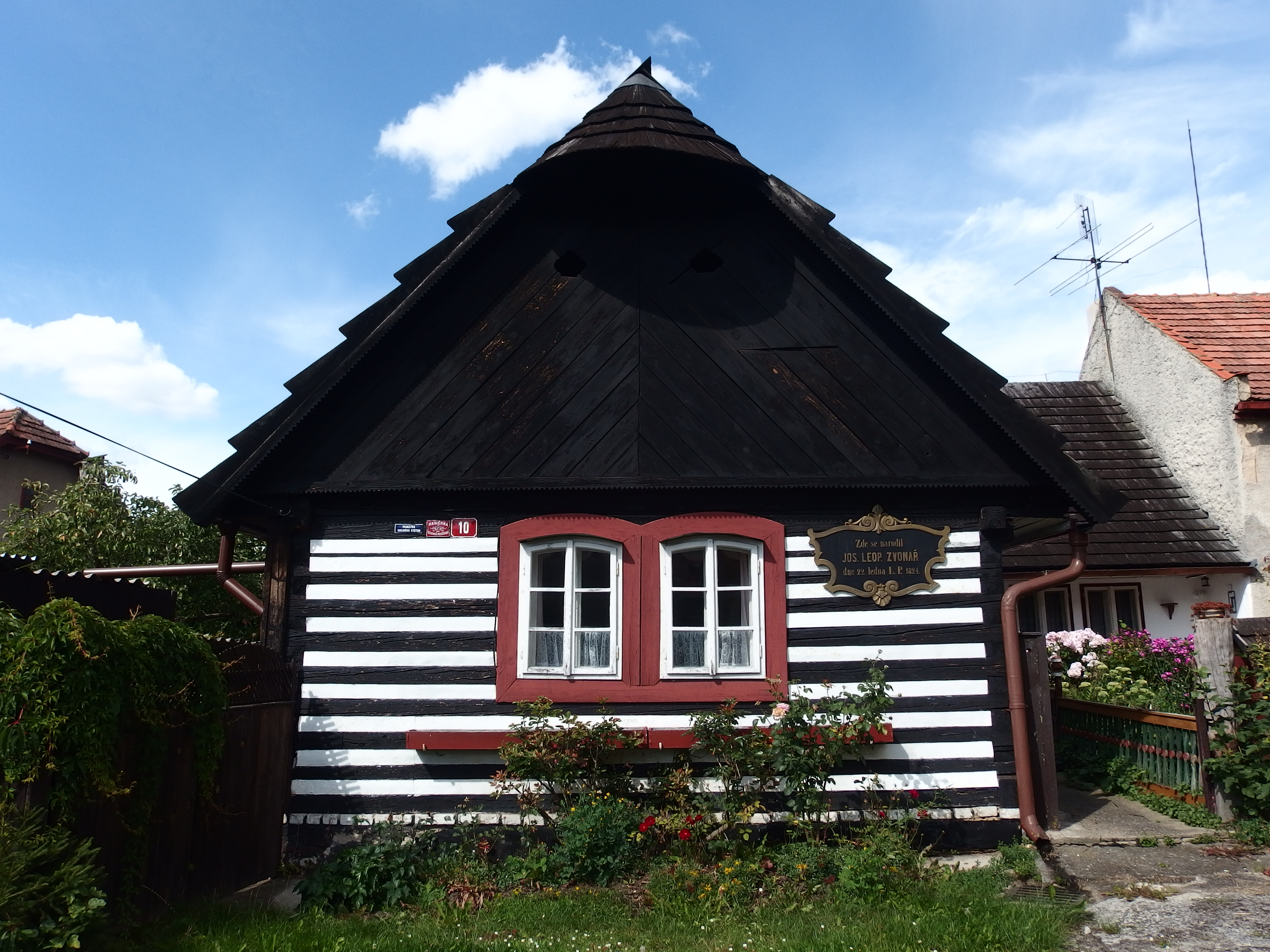
Birthplace of Josef Leopold Zvonař in Kublov

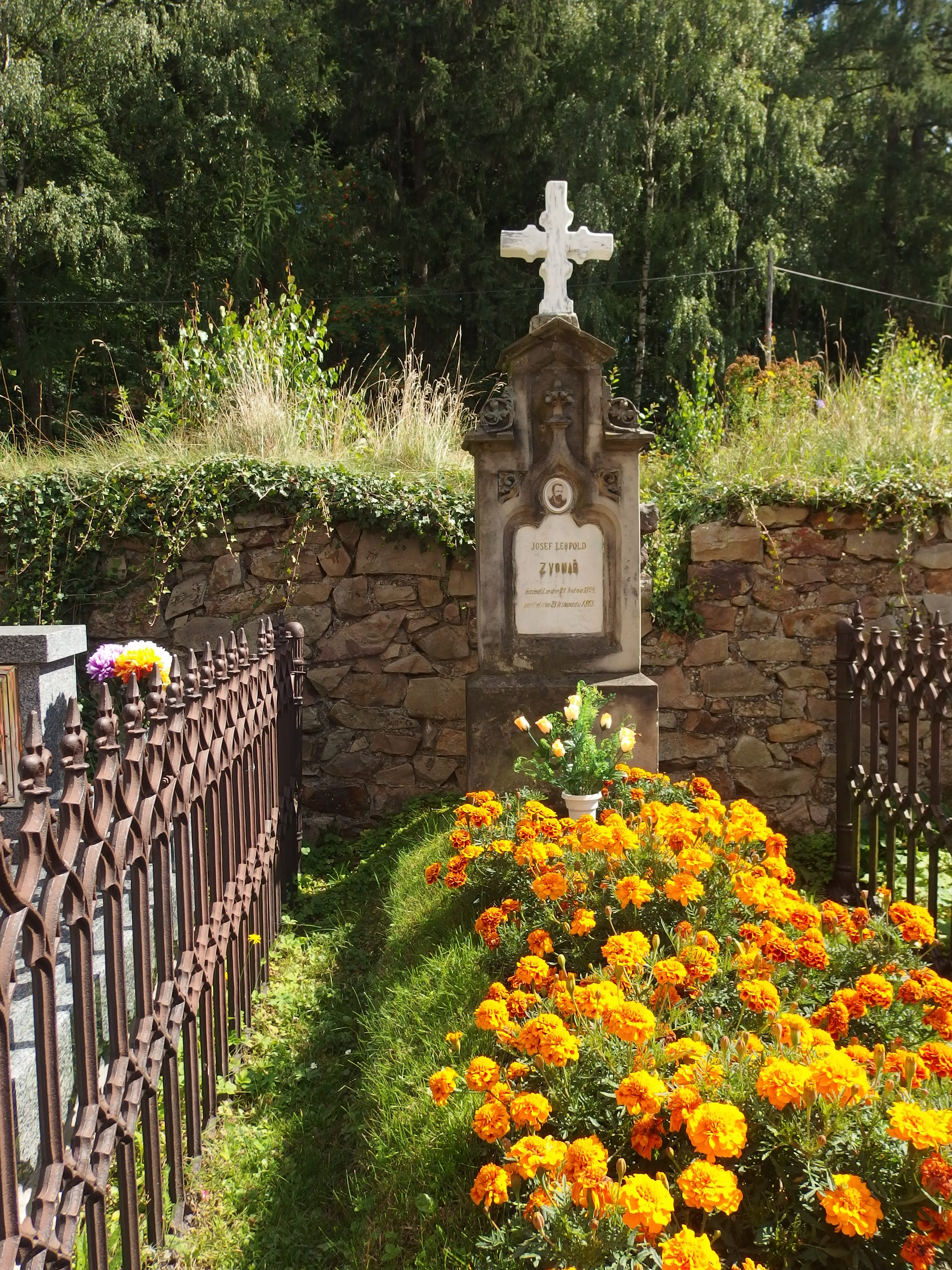
Grave of Josef Leopold Zvonař

Josef Leopold Zvonař (22 January 1824 – 23 November 1865) was a Czech composer, pedagogue, and music critic.

== Life and career ==
Zvonař was born in Kublov, studied at the organ school in Prague with Pitsch, and worked as an assistant teacher and organist there; he was briefly the school's director. In 1860 he became director of Žofín Academy, a woman's music school. He died in Prague.

Some of his early music is set to German texts, but after 1848 he aligned himself with Czech nationalism. His reviews of music appeared in Dalibor and Slavoj. He was a co-founder of the Hlahol choral society and the Umělecká Beseda, an artists' union. He may have taught Antonín Dvořák.

Zvonař composed overtures, chamber music, cantatas, an opera entitled Záboj, a requiem, and piano works, and his manuscripts are held at the National Museum in Prague. His songs were popular in his lifetime. However, he his best remembered as an educator; he was the author of the first history of Czech music, Dějiny české hudby (1860), as well as the first Czech language harmony treatise, Navedení k snadnému potřebných kadencí skládání (1859). His papers on Czech folk music were among the earliest founding documents of study in the field.

His name was often published as Leopold Zwonar, or similarly, in his day.

== Works ==
Theory and pedagogy:

- Varhanictví, umění učitelské (Organology, the Art of Teaching) (1858)
- Navedení k snadnému potřebných kadencí skládání (Instructions to the Easy Composing of Needed Cadenzas) (1859)
- Návod zpěvu, ohledem na národní školy (Instruction of Singing with Respect to the National Schools) (1860)
- Základy harmonie a zpěvu s příslušným navedením pro učitele hudby vůbec a národních kol zvláště (1861)
- Listy ředitelům zpěváckých sborů (1862-1863)
- Slovo o příčině nedostatku hudebně vzdělaných mladých učitelů (1863)
- Hudební vychovávání (Musical Education) (1863-1864)
- Příspěvky k vědomostem varhanickým (1864)
- Slovo hudebním učňům... (1865)
- Příruční knížka při vyučování zpěvu pro I. tř. městské dívčí školy (1866, 1870)

Folk songs:

- České národní písně (Czech National Folk Songs) (1859)
- Slovo o českých národních písních (A Word about Czech National Folk Songs) (1860)
- Zkumné příspěvky ku poznání povahy a ducha české hudby, čerpané z českých nár. písní duchovních i světských (Explorational Contributions to the Cognition of the Character and Spirit of the Czech Music, Acquired From the Czech Sacred and Secular National Folk Songs) (1863)

History:

- Dějiny české hudby (History of the Czech Music) (1862)
- Jan Křtitel Vaňhal (1859)
- Slovo o mších Tůmových (A Word about the Masses by Tůma)
- Hlídka po táboru hudby v Čechách (1861)
- Listy z dějin české hudby: I. Jan Trojan (1862)
- Václav Karel Holan Rovenský (1862)

Selected compositions:

Piano

- Bei Sonnenuntergang, Op. 2 (impromptu, pub. 1854)
- Lorelei, Op. 3 (Fantasiestück, pub. 1856)
- Sonata in F minor, Op. 10 (1849, published by 1857)
- Grande Suite, Op. 15 (1852, 1861) (1861 - piano 4 hands)
- Prelude et Fugue (pub. 1854)
- Primula veris, Op. 27 (1857, published posth. 1871)
- Tonstück für Pf. in G major, Op. 40 (1861, pub. 1865)
- Věneček aneb Robert Op. 17 (1861)

Organ

- Šestero předeher (Six Pastoral Preludes; Sechs Pastoral-Präludien), Op. 12 (pub. 1858)
- Sedmero skladeb (Seven Organ Compositions), Op. 14 (pub. posth. 1886)
- Pastorale and 2 Pastoral Preludes for Organ, Op. 15 (pub. 1860)
- Slavnostní předehra ("Alleluja") (Easter Overture), Op. 18
- Album pro varhaníky (Album for Organists)

Chamber

- Piano Trio in E♭ major, Op. 22 (1854)
- Piano Quintet, Op. 24 (1855)
- String Quartet in B♭ major, Op. 31 (1857)

Orchestral

- Overture in C minor, Op. 9 (1848)
- Overture in D major, Op. 23 (1855)
- Overture in C minor, Op. 37 (1860)
- Overture in B♭ major

Vocal

- Varyto a lyra (1856)
- Zpěvy pro čtyři, tři i dva hlasy (Songs for Four, Three and Two Voices) (1862)
- Gesänge religiosen Anhälts for men's chorus Op. 17 (book 1 published 1860)
- Jaro lásky (Spring of Love)
- Mladý cikán (Young Gypsy)
- Kukačky (Cuckoos) (1858)
- Věneček rozmarýnový z ohlasů písní národních (1858)
- Vocal Mass in B minor, Op. 49
- Animas fidelium

Cantatas

- Der Ritt zum Elfenstein : Ballad after a Swedish saga, for soloists, chorus and orchestra, Op. 26 (1857, published 1860)
- Cantata No. 4 in E♭ major (Zdlouha, však ne příliš)

Opera

- Záboj (1859-1862)
- Lesní kaple (Forrest Chapel)
