= Hedy (opera) =

Hedy Op. 43, is an 1896 Czech-language opera by Zdeněk Fibich in 4 acts to a libretto by Anežka Schulzová after Byron's Don Juan.

== Recordings ==
- Hedy, Act 3: "Jsem-li hříčka moci pekla" recorded by Zdeněk Otava
