= Loket (Benešov District) =

- Municipality
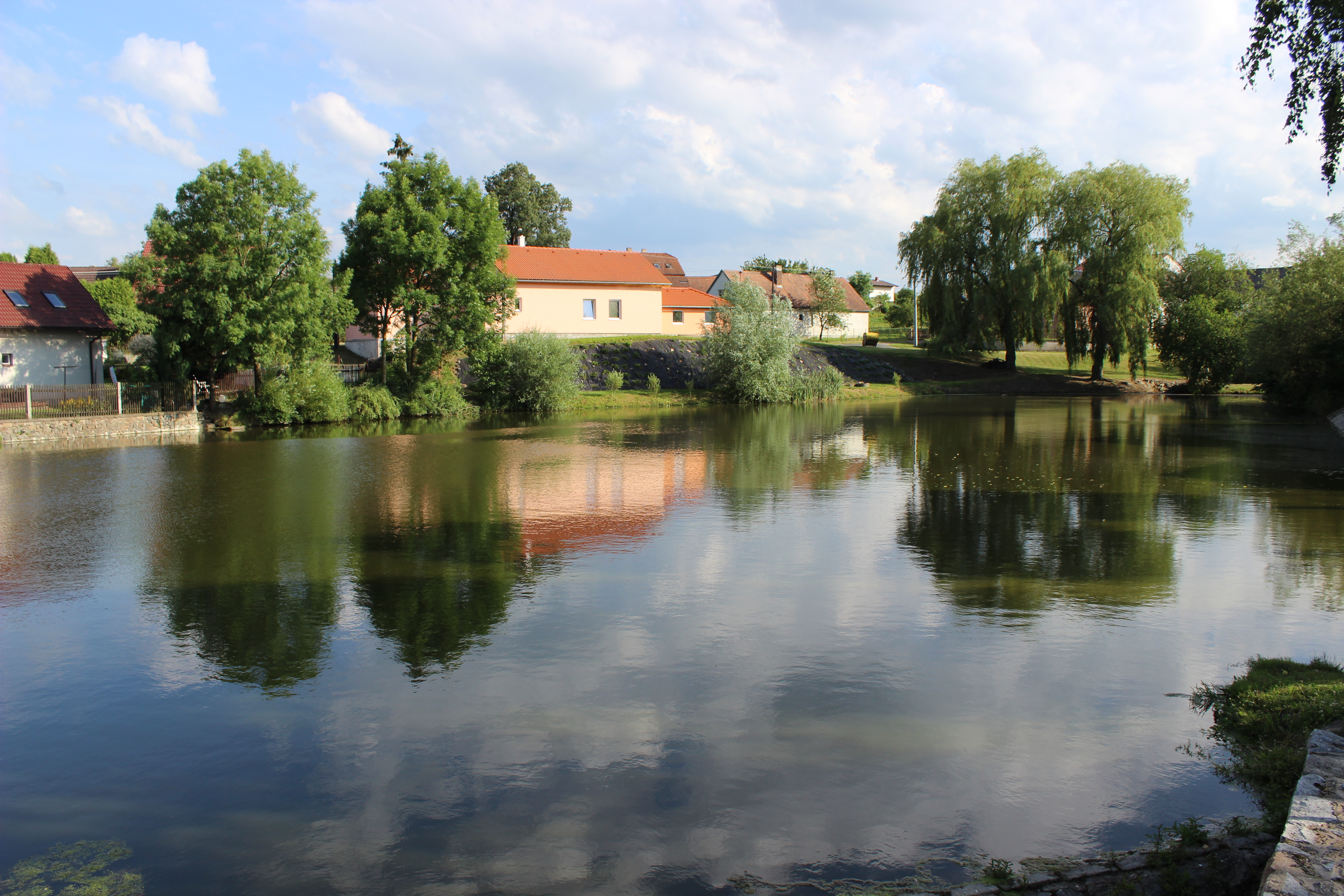
- Brzotice, a part of Loket

- Location in the Czech Republic
- Coordinates: 49°39′20″N 15°7′0″E
- Country: Czech Republic
- Region: Central Bohemian
- District: Benešov
- First mentioned: 1352

Area
  - Total: 23.88 km^{2} (9.22 sq mi)
- Elevation: 450 m (1,480 ft)

Population (2026-01-01)
  - Total: 624
  - Density: 26.1/km^{2} (67.7/sq mi)
- Time zone: UTC+1 (CET)
  - Summer (DST): UTC+2 (CEST)
- Postal codes: 257 65, 257 68
- Website: www.obecloket.cz

Loket is a municipality and village in Benešov District in the Central Bohemian Region of the Czech Republic. It has about 600 inhabitants.

== Administrative division ==
Loket consists of eight municipal parts (in brackets population according to the 2021 census):

- Loket (164)
- Alberovice (75)
- Bezděkov (35)
- Brzotice (117)
- Kačerov (23)
- Němčice (61)
- Radíkovice (22)
- Všebořice (98)

Bezděkov, Radíkovice and Všebořice form an exclave of the municipal territory.

== Etymology ==
The word loket means 'elbow' in Czech. The name referred to a bend in the road that passed through the area, in which the village was founded.

== Geography ==
Loket is located about 34 kilometres (21 mi) southeast of Benešov and 61 km (38 mi) southeast of Prague. It lies in the Křemešník Highlands. The highest point is a hill at 534 m (1,752 ft) above sea level. The village of Němčice is situated on the shore of the Němčice Reservoir. The exclave of the municipality is situated on the shore of the Švihov Reservoir.

== History ==
The first written mention of Loket is from 1352.

== Demographics ==
Historical population

Year	Pop.	±%
1869	1,972	—
1880	1,950	−1.1%
1890	1,944	−0.3%
1900	1,950	+0.3%
1910	1,831	−6.1%

Year	Pop.	±%
1921	1,768	−3.4%
1930	1,538	−13.0%
1950	1,207	−21.5%
1961	946	−21.6%
1970	890	−5.9%

Year	Pop.	±%
1980	708	−20.4%
1991	611	−13.7%
2001	560	−8.3%
2011	575	+2.7%
2021	595	+3.5%

Source: Censuses

== Transport ==
The D1 motorway from Prague to Brno passes through the municipality.

== Sights ==
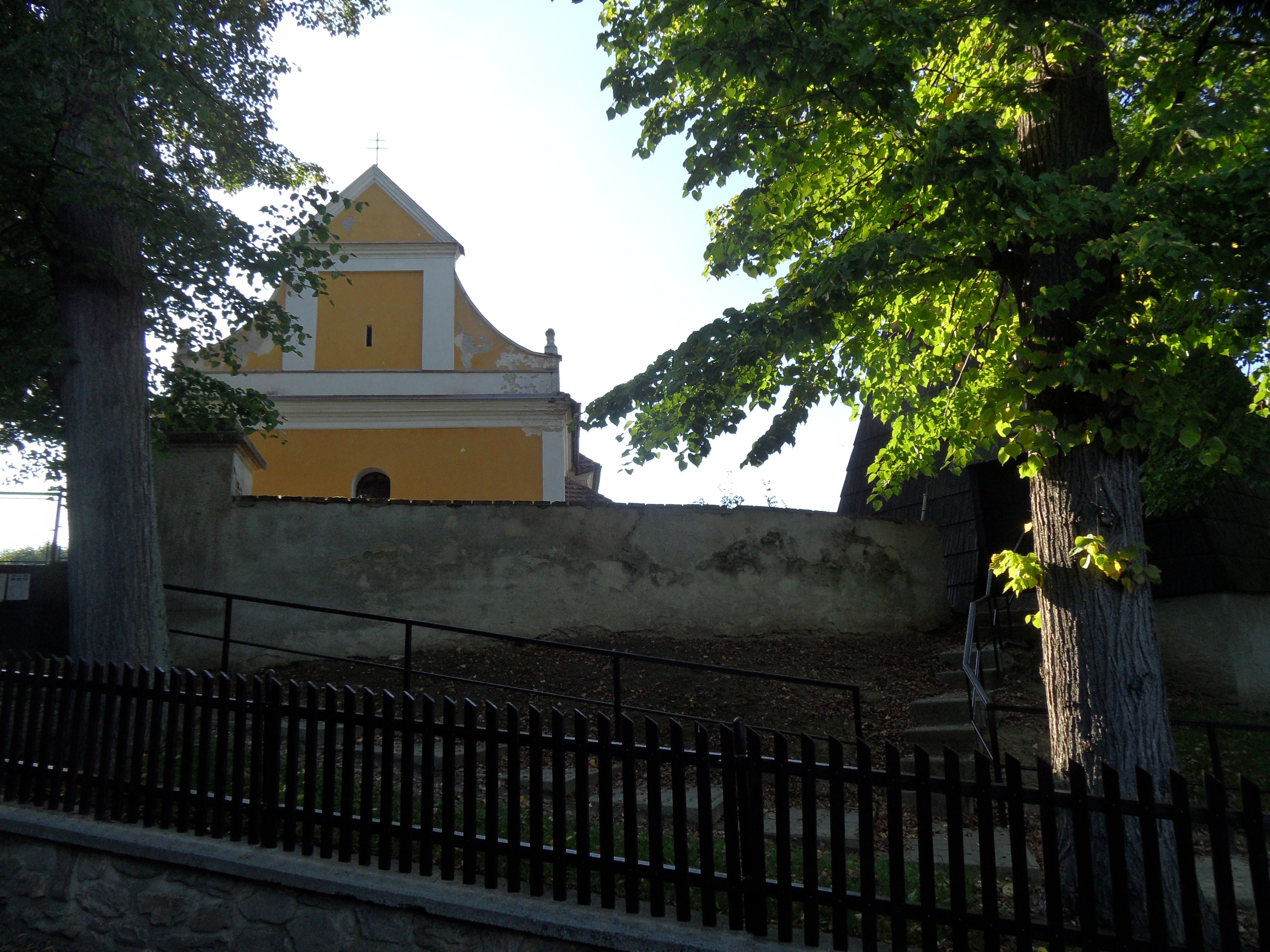
Church of Saint Giles

The most important monument of the municipality is the Church of Saint Giles in Všebořice. The core of the building probably dates from the turn of the 13th and 14th centuries. Next to the church is a separate wooden bell tower from the beginning of the 16th century.

The main historical landmark of the village of Loket is a chapel dating from 1911.

== Notable people ==
- Zdeněk Fibich (1850–1900), composer
