= Zdeněk Nejedlý =

Czech musicologist, historian and politician (1878–1962)

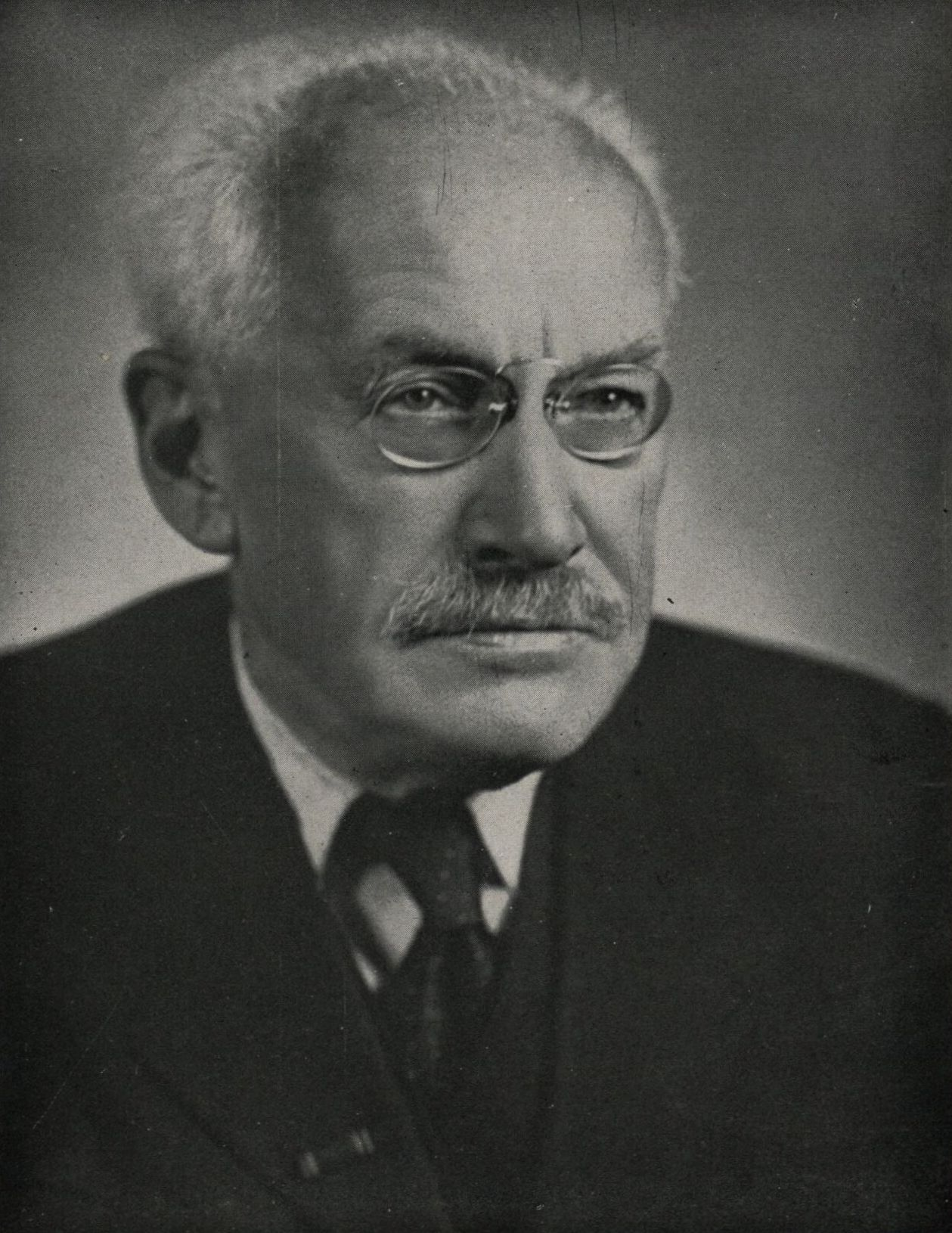
- Official portrait, 1948

Minister of Culture and Education
- In office 5 April 1945 – 2 July 1946
- Preceded by: Emanuel Moravec
- Succeeded by: Jaroslav Stránský
- In office 25 February 1948 – 31 January 1953
- Preceded by: Jaroslav Stránský
- Succeeded by: Ernest Sýkora

Personal details
- Born: 10 February 1878 Litomyšl, Kingdom of Bohemia, Austria-Hungary
- Died: 9 March 1962 (aged 84) Prague, Czechoslovakia
- Party: Communist Party of Czechoslovakia
- Spouse: Marie Brichtová
- Education: Faculty of Arts, Charles University in Prague

Zdeněk Nejedlý (10 February 1878 – 9 March 1962) was a Czech musicologist, historian, music critic, author, and politician whose ideas dominated the cultural life of what is now the Czech Republic for most of the twentieth century. Although he started out merely reviewing operas in Prague newspapers in 1901, by the interwar period his status had risen, guided primarily by socialist and later Communist political views. This combination of left wing politics and cultural leadership made him a central figure in the early years of the Czechoslovak Socialist Republic after 1948, where he became the first Minister of Culture and Education. In this position he was responsible for creating a statewide education curriculum, and was associated with the early 1950s expulsion of university professors.

== Biography ==
=== Early life and career ===
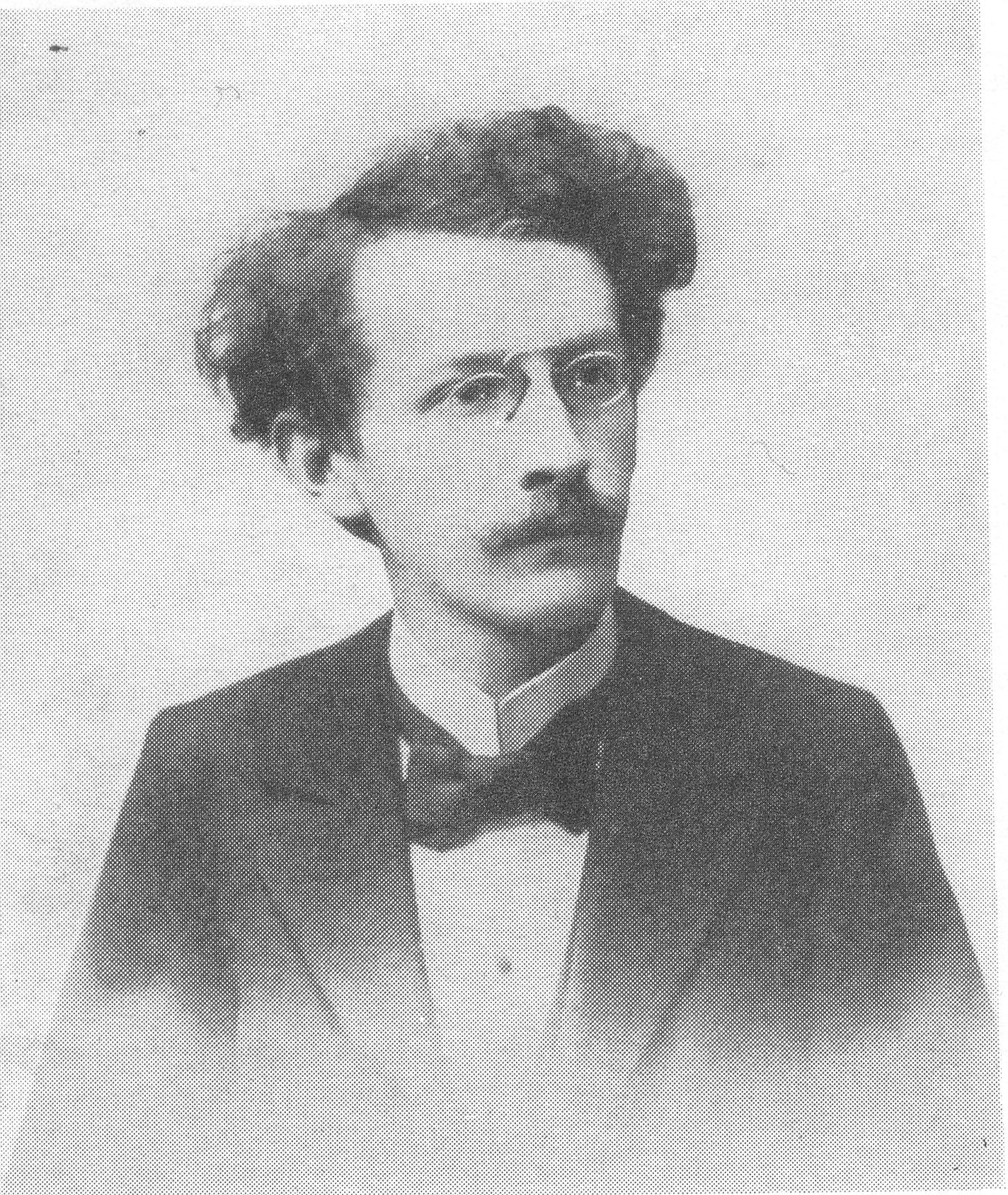
Zdeněk Nejedlý in 1905.

Son of the east Bohemian composer and pedagogue Roman Nejedlý (1844–1920), Zdeněk Nejedlý had the good fortune to be born in Litomyšl, the historic birthplace of the composer Bedřich Smetana, the so-called "Father of Czech music" and a significant figurehead in the Czechs' nineteenth-century National Revival movement. His formal education in music began with Josef Šťastný at the Litomyšl Gymnasium (1888–1896), alongside instruction in Czech history. In 1896 he moved to Prague to study at Charles University, where he attended lectures in positivist history with Jaroslav Goll and music aesthetics with Otakar Hostinský, finally receiving his doctorate in 1900. Hostinský, a great proponent of Smetana's music, suggested that Nejedlý study composition and music theory with his like-minded colleague, Zdeněk Fibich, whose personality and tastes had a profound effect on his young student. Although his first publications were devoted to Czech history, after Fibich's death in 1900 Nejedlý devoted himself to musicology, authoring a monograph entitled Zdenko Fibich, Founder of the Scenic Melodrama in 1901 as a first attempt at gaining greater recognition for his mentor. That these efforts were directed against the musical establishment of Prague (who he felt had victimized Smetana, Fibich, and Hostinský) was made clear by his first foray into music criticism that same year, in an attack on Antonín Dvořák's opera Rusalka shortly after its premiere.

These factional divisions were to inspire Nejedlý throughout his whole career; in many ways he was personally responsible for perpetuating them for future generations, long after their currency in Czech musical society. His 1903 History of Czech Music drew distinct battle lines between the Conservatory students of Dvořák and the supposed inheritors of Smetana, including the composers Josef Bohuslav Foerster, Otakar Ostrčil, and Otakar Zich, all personal friends of Nejedlý's on the outs with the Prague establishment. Over the next decade he produced an extraordinary amount of writing on music, including monographs on pre-Hussite song (1904, 1907, and 1913), Smetana's operas 1908, Czech Modern Opera Since Smetana (1911, notoriously excluding Dvořák), Hostinský (1907 and 1910), and Gustav Mahler (1913). In 1908 he began to lecture in musicology at Charles University, forming a circle of devoted young colleagues that included Zich and Vladimír Helfert.

=== Polemics and the interwar years ===
When Nejedlý's music reviews for Prague's daily newspapers grew distasteful in their anti-Conservatory bias, he and his followers were precipitously banned from publication, forcing the group to found their own journal, Smetana, which ran for sixteen years, 1910–1927. From this vantage point Nejedlý launched the so-called "Dvořák Affair" (1911–1914), in which he sought to attack the legacy of the great composer; any contemporary artists who sided against him (especially the 31 musicians who signed a public petition in 1912) became the focus of fierce personal attacks. Beginning with Vítězslav Novák in 1913, Nejedlý sought to end the careers of composers who did not conform to his pro-Smetana views of modern tradition and social responsibility: other notable targets included Josef Suk. Meanwhile, these tactics came back to haunt Nejedlý's own protégés, especially Ostrčil as director of Prague's National Theatre and Zich as a modernist opera composer.

After the legalization of the Czechoslovak Communist Party in 1921, Nejedlý became one of its earliest and most outspoken supporters. With the exception of his Smetana journal, he turned away from mainstream journal publications, focusing on the Communist daily Rudé právo, where he supported the newly elected General Secretary Klement Gottwald and his wing of the Communist Party, and his own political journal, Var (Boiling, 1921–30). In these he chastised the interwar Czechoslovak Republic, its president Tomáš Garrigue Masaryk, and various other leaders; the last issue of Var was taken up with a detailed defense of Alban Berg's opera Wozzeck, which Ostrčil had produced in 1926. By this point, however, his many musicology students were among the main critics in Prague, carrying on his work on his behalf. After the close of Var, his main involvements in music included a short polemic with Novák and monographs on Ostrčil (1935, to commemorate his friend's death), the National Theatre (1936), and Soviet music (1937). in 1932 he became chairman of another independent left-wing association, the Left Front, and from 1935 he was chairman of the International Association of Marxist Historians (from the following year, the association was called the Socialist Academy).

=== Wartime and postwar communism ===
During the Nazi occupation of the Czech Lands, the Nejedlý family fled to the Soviet Union, where he supposedly helped Czech resistance activities from afar and officially joined the Communist Party in 1939. At this time, his son Vít Nejedlý (1912–45), whose short career in Prague had focused on Communist agitprop pieces and workers' choruses, was involved with a Czech brigade attached to the Red Army, whose band he attempted to emulate. After the end of the war (and Vít's death from typhus after the battle of Dukla, January 1945), Zdeněk Nejedlý returned to Prague to participate in the postwar government. Initially in Eduard Beneš's Third Republic he was made Minister of Education, Arts, and Sciences, but this was exchanged for Social Security by 1946. After the Communist seizure of power (the “February Revolution”) in 1948 he returned to Culture and Education with enhanced powers, a post he kept until 1953.

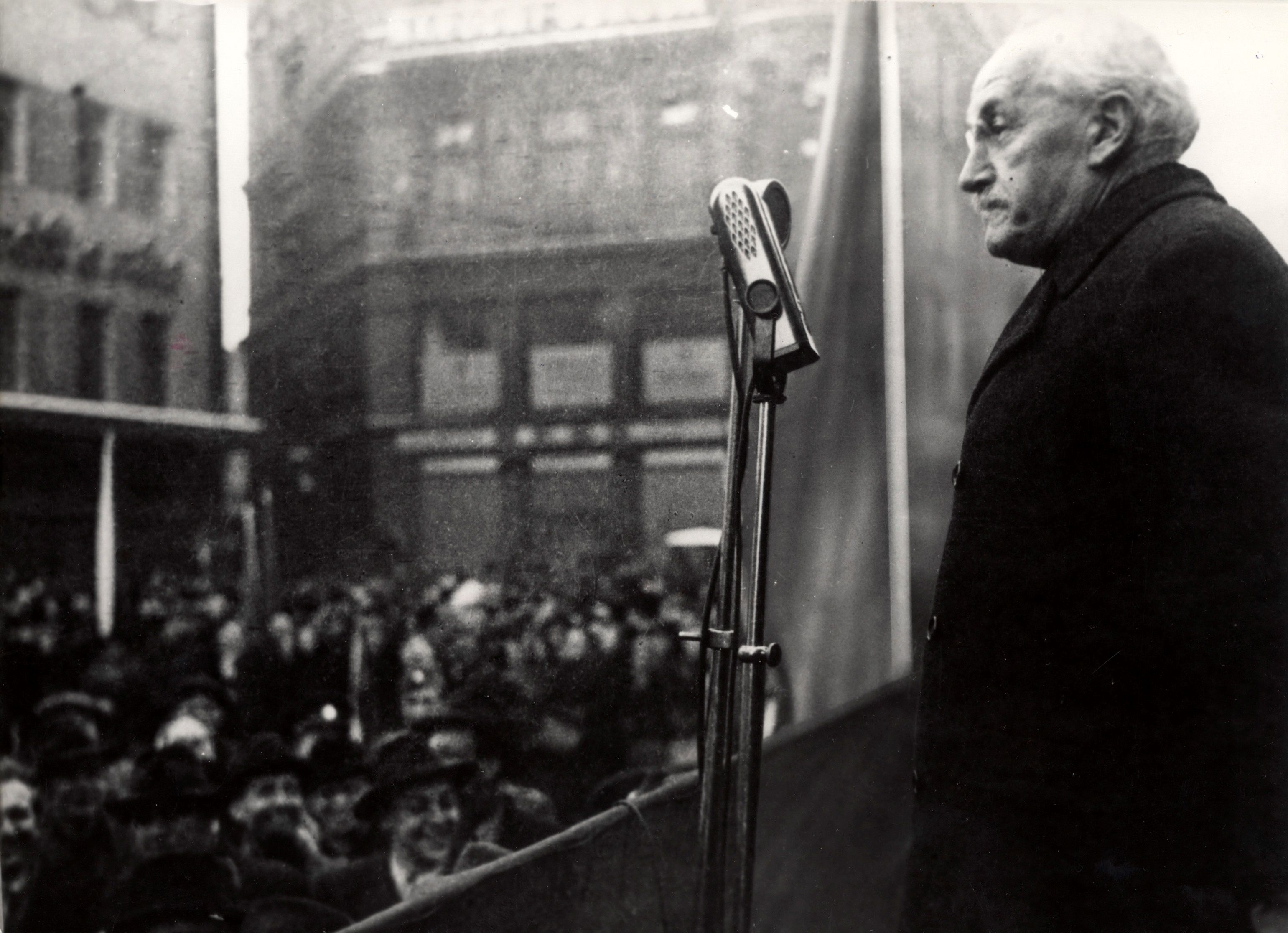
Zdeněk Nejedlý in February 1948

These crucial years saw the implementation of a statewide curriculum at all levels of education: his revisionist stance toward Czech history was given the force of law. This included down-playing the achievements of the vanished democracy as a series of bourgeois trends that were ultimately damaging to society.

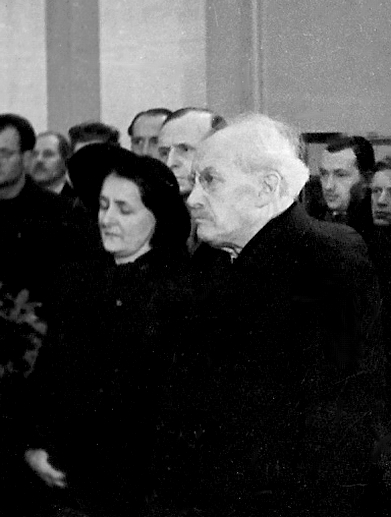
Nejedlý and his wife in 1945

It was also Nejedlý's chance to promote his passion for Smetana and his "lineage", now enacted as state law. To this latter end he entered a new stage of retrospective publishing, with works like The History of My Smetanism, On Czech Culture, and especially The Communists—Inheritors of the Grand Progressive Tradition of the Czech Nation. These works and especially their ideology were retained, in some form or another, in the Czechoslovak Socialist Republic all the way until the fall of Communism (the “Velvet Revolution”) in 1989. As such, Nejedlý's name was associated with totalitarian hegemony by at least two generations of students, many of whom had no connection to his musicology.

=== The show trials and Josef Hutter ===
After approximately two years of Communist dictatorship, the Czechoslovak Communist Party began a purge of its own party or former non-communist opponents, most notoriously manifested in the arrest and execution of Rudolf Slánský and Milada Horáková. For Nejedlý, this atmosphere provided an opportunity to settle old scores in the academic and musical community. Over ten years before, in the mid-1930s, Nejedlý's public attacks against artists such as Leoš Janáček had turned many of his former adherents against him, most notably Vladimír Helfert, whose work as a musicologist had outstripped his teacher's, and Josef Hutter, who had published on Ostrčil and Zich. When Helfert published a landmark monograph, Czech Modern Music: A Study of Czech Musical Creativity (1936) that included a scathing attack on ideological bias in music criticism, Nejedlý expected his remaining followers to shun Helfert and condemn the publication. Hutter publicly sided with Helfert. During the Nazi occupation, both men were imprisoned by the Nazis: Helfert for Communist resistance (for which he was severely tortured, dying in May 1945) and Hutter for pro-Democratic resistance. After the war, Hutter returned to Charles University, but was expelled in 1950 and arrested on trumped-up charges. He was sentenced to thirty-nine years imprisonment, but served only six, having been released during an amnesty. His health broken, Hutter died in 1959, three years before his former teacher.

Zdeněk Nejedlý died on 9 March 1962, and was buried in the Vyšehrad cemetery at Prague's Vyšehrad castle, reserved for Czech heroes and significant representatives of Czech culture. His grave is near those of Smetana, Ostrčil, and his son, Vít.
