= Vítězslav Novák =

Czech composer and pedagogue (1870–1949)

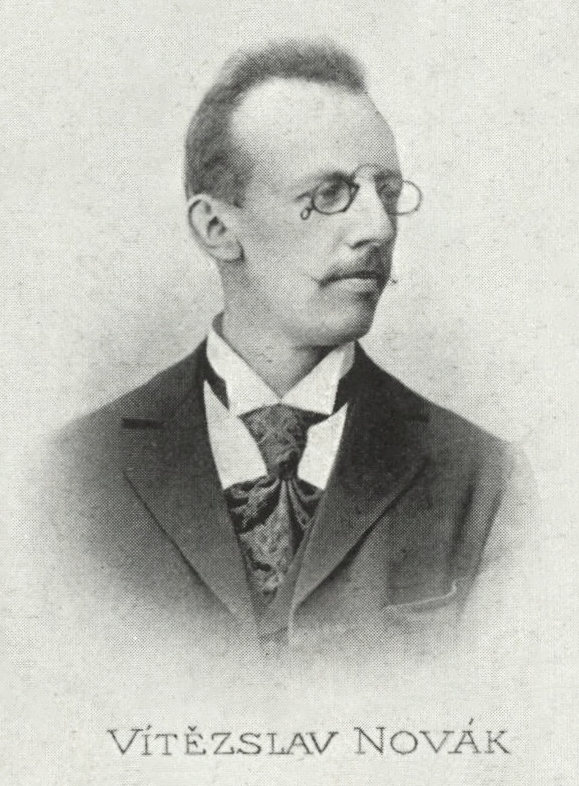
- Novák in 1899
- Born: Viktor Novák; 5 December 1870; Kamenice nad Lipou, Bohemia
- Died: 18 July 1949 (aged 78); Skuteč, Czechoslovakia
- Education: Prague Conservatory
- Occupations: Composer; Academic teacher
- Organizations: Prague Conservatory

Vítězslav Augustín Rudolf Novák (5 December 1870 – 18 July 1949) was a Czech composer and academic teacher at the Prague Conservatory. Stylistically, he was part of the neo-romantic tradition, and his music is considered an important example of Czech modernism. He worked towards a strong Czech identity in culture after the country became independent in 1918. His compositions include operas and orchestral works.

== Biography ==
=== Early years ===
Novák (baptized Viktor Novák) was born in Kamenice nad Lipou, a small town in Southern Bohemia. In 1872 the family moved to Počátky, where Novák first studied the violin with Antonín Šilhan and the piano with Marie Krejčová. After the death of his father in 1882, the family moved to Jindřichův Hradec, where Novák continued his studies at grammar school (Schnierer and Tyrrell 2001). An elementary school in the town is named after Novák today. In his late teens, he moved to Prague to study at the Prague Conservatory, changing his name to Vítězslav to identify more closely with his Czech identity, as many of those of his generation had already done. At the conservatory, he studied piano and attended Antonín Dvořák's masterclasses in composition where his fellow students included Josef Suk, Oskar Nedbal, and Rudolf Karel. When Dvořák departed for his three-year stay in America (1892–1895), Novák continued his studies with the ultra-conservative Karel Stecker. However, just before and after 1900, shortly after his graduation, Novák wrote a series of compositions that put distance between himself and the teachings of both Stecker and Dvořák, edging his style toward the fledgling modernist movement.

Beginning in the late 1890s, Novák began to explore influences beyond the prevailing Wagner/Brahms aesthetic of his contemporaries in Prague. Among these were folk influences from Moravia and Slovakia, which at that time were considered culturally backward in the cosmopolitan Czech capital. He also developed an interest in what would come to be called musical Impressionism, although in later life he denied any exposure to the music of Debussy at this time, claiming instead to have arrived at similar techniques on his own. These included forays into bitonality and non-functional, parallel harmony. Finally, after the Prague premiere of Salome in 1906, Novák formed an attachment to the music of Richard Strauss that would remain for the rest of his career.

=== Musicology and feud ===
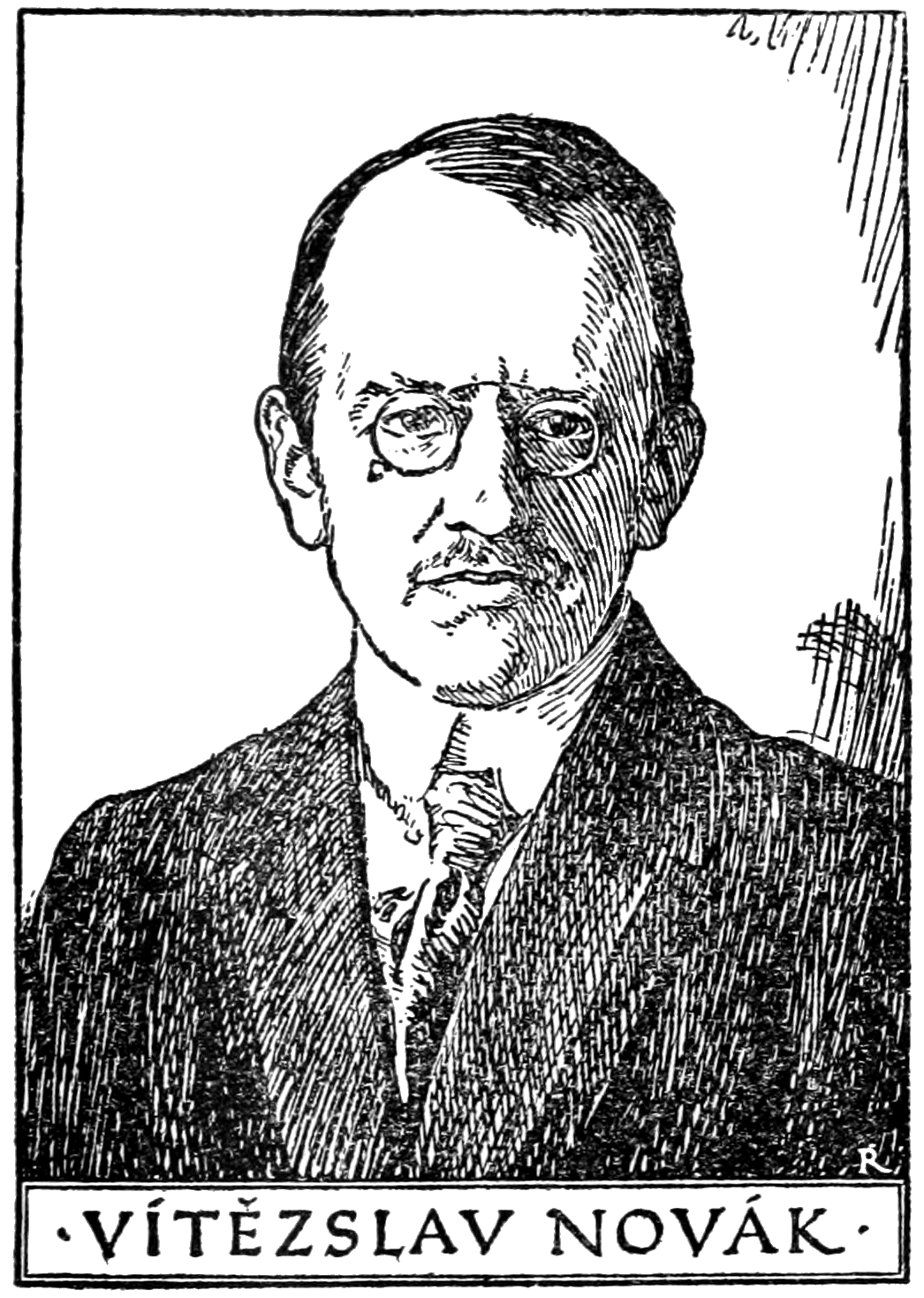

Shortly after the turn of the century, Novák began teaching composition privately in Prague. From 1909 to 1920, he taught at the Prague Conservatory himself, and this occasionally occupied him to a greater degree than composing. Among his students were Alois Hába, Iša Krejčí, Vítězslava Kaprálová, Ladislav Vycpálek, Otakar Jeremiáš and Stefania Turkewich. During the same period, several events affected Novák's outlook on musical expression and artistic freedom. From 1901 to 1917, his apartment hosted a discussion group known as the Podskalská filharmonie. While most of its members were musicians, including Suk, Karel, and the conductor Václav Talich, performances were confined to readings of new modernist works from abroad and the group's goals were primarily intellectual; the Filharmonie served, however, as an important place for this group of Czech modernists to share their ideas. By regulation, its only female member was Marie Prášková, whom Novák married in 1912. That same year, Novák became embroiled in a series of culturo-political battles in Prague between his Conservatory-based faction and that of Zdeněk Nejedlý, a critic and musicologist at Prague University. When Novák signed a protest against Nejedlý's anti-Dvořák propaganda, Nejedlý engaged in fierce criticism of Novák's music. The impact of this criticism on Novák was long-lasting and ushered in a crisis in his creative life.

=== Political affairs ===
Upon the independence of Czechoslovakia in 1918, Novák turned his focus toward the administration of culture in the new democratic regime. In this capacity, he led the push toward de-Germanification and nationalization of the Conservatory, during which process his German-Bohemian colleagues, including Alexander Zemlinsky and Paul Nettl, were forced out to form a segregated institution. Novák became the new administrative head of the Czech-only institution and held various titles, alternating with Suk and others, until his retirement. During this period he continued to teach composition in the form of masterclasses, thereby influencing a new interwar generation of musicians, despite the increasing conservatism of his compositions in the 1920s.

=== Renewal and death ===
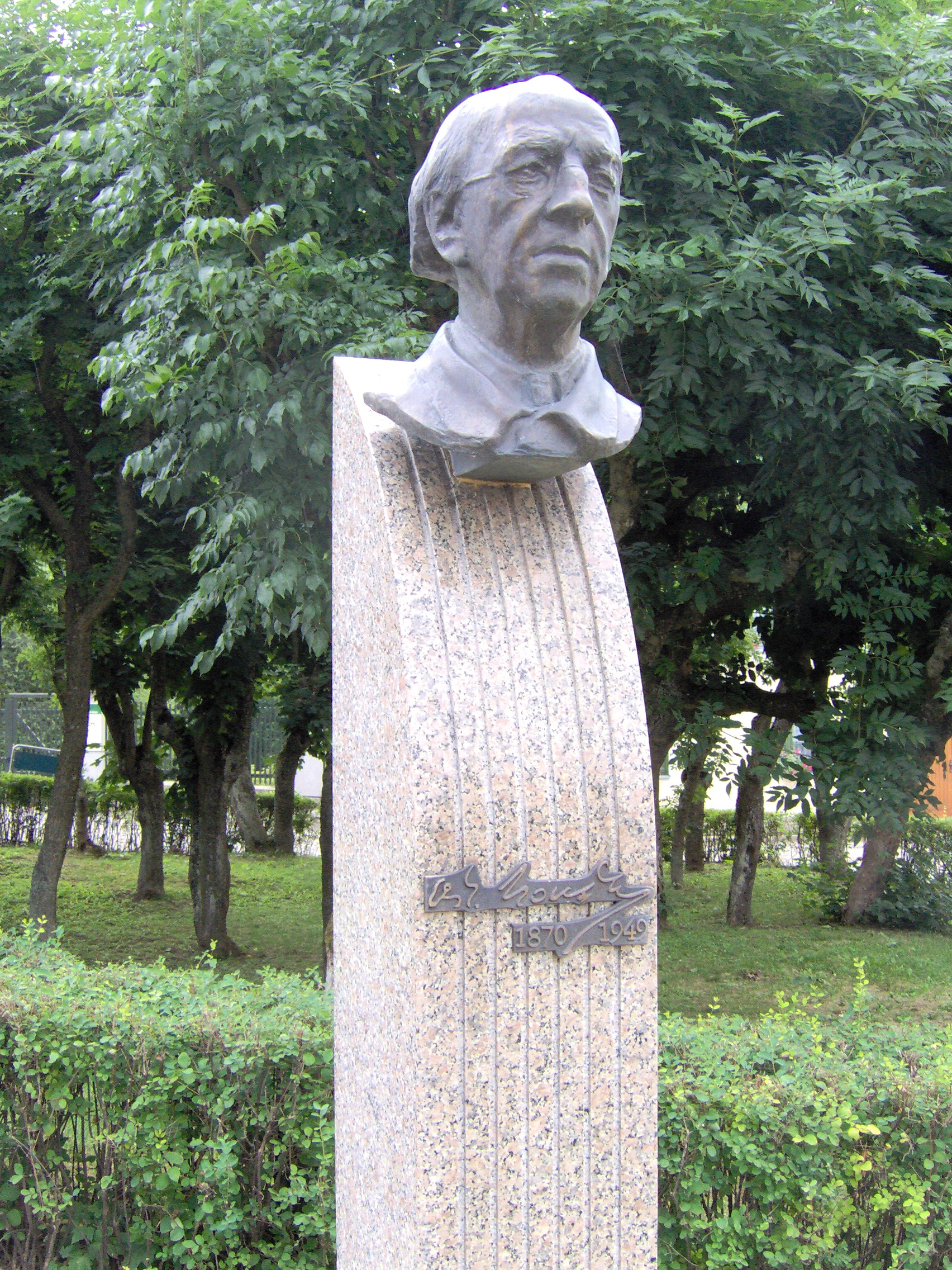
Vítězslav Novák

In the 1930s, Novák went through a period of artistic renewal with the premieres of some large-scale compositions. After the collapse of democracy and the subsequent Nazi protectorate in 1939, Novák, then retired, gained credibility among his younger Czech contemporaries through the performance of several patriotic and morale-boosting works, meant as a musical form of resistance. After the Second World War, he wrote a lengthy memoir, entitled O sobě a jiných (Of Myself and Others, publ. 1970), in which he aired many of his long-standing grudges, especially toward his main rival, Otakar Ostrčil, but also even his close friend Josef Suk. He died in Skuteč in Eastern Bohemia, where he had spent much of his last years.

== Compositional career ==
Novák's music retained at least some elements of the late-Romantic style until his death. His earliest work to receive an opus number was a piano trio in G minor, but it was preceded, in order of composition, by several works including an unpublished serenade in B minor for piano dating from 1886 to 1887; all of these bear the influences of Schumann and Grieg. In his earliest years after graduating from Prague Conservatory, his work began to show some influence from Moravian and Slovak folk music, which he began to collect and study in the late 1890s. Within the decade he had assimilated the basic intervallic and rhythmic characteristics of these folksongs into a very personal compositional style. The first works to reveal this change are the Second String Quartet, op. 35 (1905), and the path-breaking solo piano work, Sonata Eroica, op. 24 (1900).

The next influence was that of French impressionism, which first appears in the song cycle Melancholie, op. 25, composed in 1901, and is most apparent in the tone poem O věčné touze (Of the Eternal Longing, op. 33, completed 1905). Meanwhile, the more monumental aspects of his style, evident in the Slovak-inspired tone poem V Tatrách (In the Tatras, op. 26, 1902) and the song cycle Údolí nového království (Valley of the New Kingdom, op. 31, 1903) combined with his discovery of the music of Strauss: the result was the tone poem, Toman a lesní Panna (Toman and the Wood Nymph, op. 40, completed 1907).

The height of his compositional career was considered, including in the criticism of the day, to consist of two principal achievements, both completed in 1910: Pan, the five-movement tone poem for piano solo (totalling some sixty pages of music, op. 43), and Bouře (The Tempest, op. 42, to a text by Svatopluk Čech). The latter was a grandiose symphonic cantata for soloists, chorus, and orchestra, running to just under an hour of unbroken music; its attention to musico-dramatic detail was evidence of Novák's increasing interest in opera, a style in which he had not written at that point.

His conflict with Nejedlý brought about a sharp change in Novák's attitude to composition, wherein fear of rejection became more important than artistic exploration. The negative response from the public to the orchestrated version of Pan (1912) and the next cantata, Svatební košile ("The Wedding Shirt", 1913), based on the same Erben text as Dvořák's more famous work) caused severe self-doubt and depression. Novák attempted to turn the situation around with two operas about Czech historical subjects, a transparently nationalist move during wartime. Zvíkovský rarášek (The Zvíkov Imp, 1915, a comedy based on Stroupežnický) and Karlštejn (Karlštejn castle, 1916, a more serious work based on Vrchlický) both met with mixed reviews, although the latter became a fixture in the repertoire of Czech opera houses through the mid-century. These works exemplified Novák's tendency toward bitonality, latent in the early folksong work.

Czechoslovak independence in 1918 sparked several patriotic compositions, dedicated to the "President-Liberator" Tomáš Garrigue Masaryk and the Czechoslovak Legion. These democratic impulses led to a stylistic conservatism, such that the artistic experimentation of 1900–1916 all but disappeared. The two remaining operas, Lucerna (The Lantern, 1923, based on Jirásek), and Dědův odkaz (The grandfather's legacy, 1926, based on Heyduk) met with predominantly negative criticism, and Novák developed extreme bitterness toward the cultural forces that opposed him, leading him toward reactionism.

With two ballet-pantomimes completed in 1928–29, Signorina Gioventù and Nikotina, Novák regained some of the respect he had lost among his colleagues; the layering of orchestral effects (including mixed meters and even references to tango) won him the approval of some younger composers, such as Iša Krejčí and Alois Hába. In the 1930s he returned to chamber music, but also large forms such as the epic choral/orchestral work, Podzimní symfonie (Autumn Symphony, op. 62, premiered 1934).

During the Nazi occupation, Novák rose again in the estimation of his compatriots as a result of his patriotic works: the symphonic poems with organ, De Profundis (op. 67, 1941) and Svatováclavský triptych (Saint Wenceslas Triptych, op. 70, 1942) and the Májová symfonie (May Symphony, op. 73, dedicated to Stalin as liberator of the Czechs and premiered after the war in 1945) demonstrate these sentiments. In his remaining years he was primarily engaged with choral works based on South-Bohemian folksong.

== Works ==
=== Dramatic works ===
- Zvíkovský rarášek, Op. 49, comic opera, 1913–14
- Karlštejn, Op. 50, opera, 1914–15
- Lucerna, Op. 56, musical fairytale, 1919–22
- Dedův odkaz (Grandfather's legacy), Op. 57, opera, 1922–25
- Signorina Gioventu, Op. 68, ballet pantomime, 1926–28
- Nikotina, Op. 59, ballet pantomime, 1929
- Žižka, Op.78, incidental music, 1948

=== Symphonies ===
- Podzimní symfonie, Op. 62 (Autumn Symphony), for choirs and large orchestra, 1931–1934;
  1. Allegro appassionato
  2. Bacchanale
  3. Adagio
- Májová symfonie, Op. 73 (May Symphony), for soloists, choir, and orchestra, 1943;
  1. Andante sostenuto
  2. Andante
  3. Alla marcia funebre

=== Orchestral works ===
- Korzár (The Corsair), overture after Byron, 1892
- Serenade, Op. 9, for small orchestra, 1894-1895, revised 1949
- Piano Concerto in E minor, 1895
  1. Allegro energico
  2. Andante con sentimento
  3. Allegro giusto
- Maryša, Op. 18, dramatic overture, 1898
- V Tatrách (In the Tatra mountains), Op. 26, symphonic poem, 1902
- Slovácká svita, Op. 32 (Slovak Suite), for small orchestra,1903
- O večné touze, Op. 33 (Eternal Longing), after Hans Christian Andersen, 1903-05
- 2 Valašské tance, Op. 34, 1904
- Serenade, Op. 36, for small orchestra, 1905
- Toman a lesní panna, Op. 40 (Toman and the Wood Nymph), symphonic poem, 1906-07
- Lady Godiva, Op. 41, overture after the tragedy by Vrchlicky, 1907
- Pan, Op. 43, symphonic poem, 1910
- Jihočeská svita (South Bohemian Suite), Op. 64, 1936-37
- De Profundis, Op. 67, symphonic poem‚ 1941
- Svatováclavský triptych, Op. 70 (St. Wenceslas triptych), for organ and orchestra, 1941

=== Voice and orchestra ===
- Melancholické písně o lásce (Melancholic songs about love), Op. 38, for soprano and orchestra, 1906
- Bouře, Op. 42 (de storm), voor solisten, koor en orkest, 1908-10
- Svatební košile, Op. 48, after Erben, for soloists, choir and orchestra, 1912-13
- 3 české zpěvy, Op. 53 (3 Czech songs), for male choir and orchestra, 1918
- 2 romances, Op. 63 (on a text by Jan Neruda), 1934
- In memoriam, Op. 65, 4 songs for mezzo-soprano, string orchestra, harp, and tamtam, 1936-37
- 2 legendy na slova lidové‚ poesie moravské (2 legends on Moravian folk poetry), Op. 76, for mezzo-soprano and orchestra, 1944
- Hvězdy, for female choir and orchestra, 1949
