= Plánice =

- Town
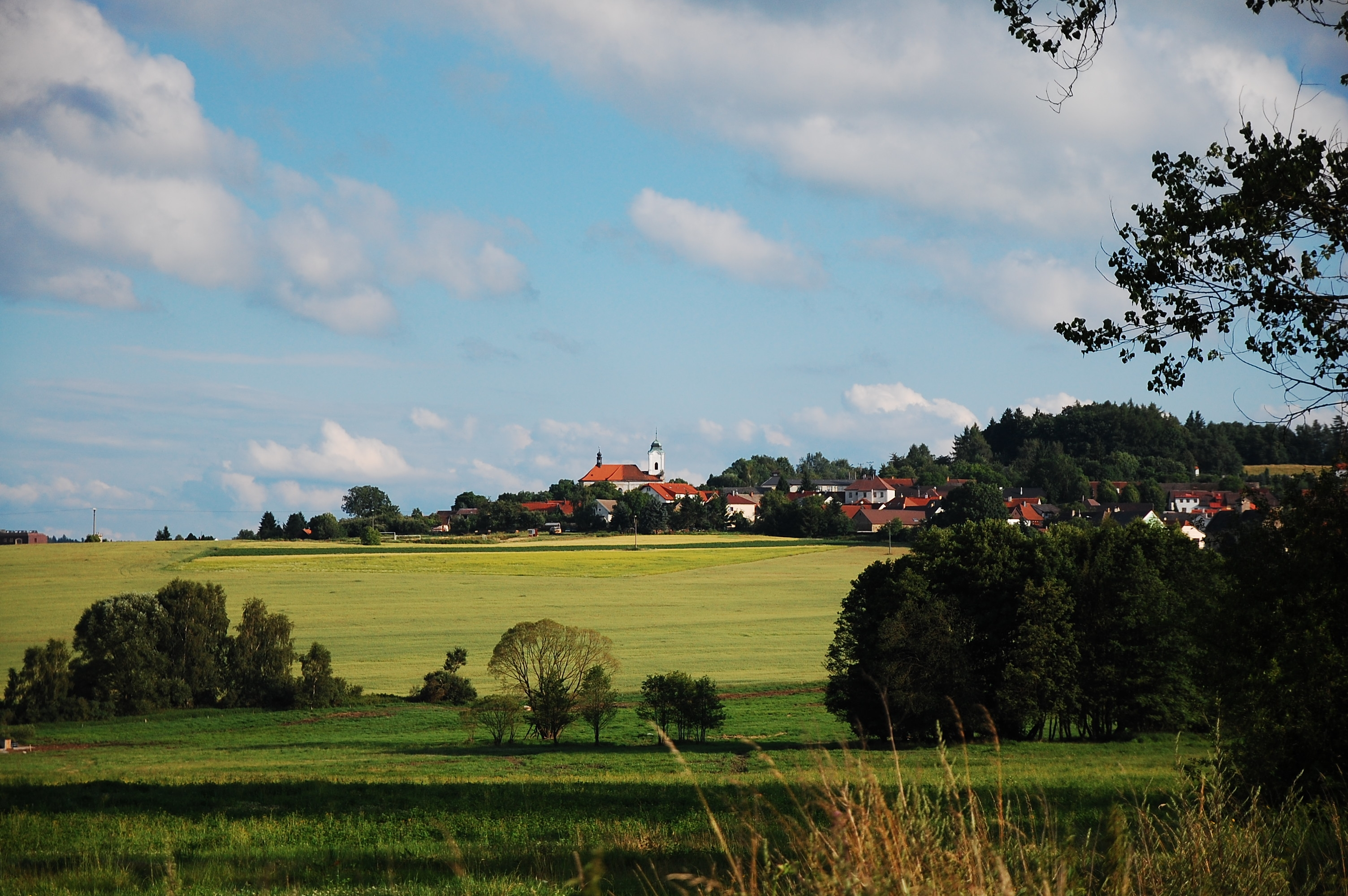
- Panorama of Plánice

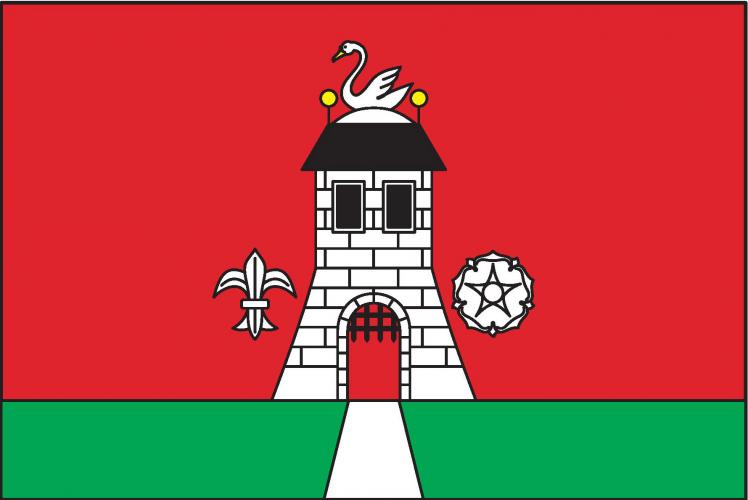
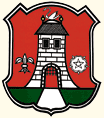
- Flag Coat of arms

- Location in the Czech Republic
- Coordinates: 49°23′22″N 13°28′29″E
- Country: Czech Republic
- Region: Plzeň
- District: Klatovy
- First mentioned: 1329

Government
  - Mayor: Zdeněk Pavlíček

Area
  - Total: 55.64 km^{2} (21.48 sq mi)
- Elevation: 579 m (1,900 ft)

Population (2026-01-01)
  - Total: 1,627
  - Density: 29.24/km^{2} (75.74/sq mi)
- Time zone: UTC+1 (CET)
  - Summer (DST): UTC+2 (CEST)
- Postal codes: 339 01, 340 34, 341 01, 341 42
- Website: www.planice.cz

Plánice (Czech pronunciation: [ˈplaːɲɪtsɛ]; German: Planitz) is a town in Klatovy District in the Plzeň Region of the Czech Republic. It has about 1,600 inhabitants.

== Administrative division ==
Plánice consists of 12 municipal parts (in brackets population according to the 2021 census):

- Plánice (850)
- Bližanovy (102)
- Křížovice (52)
- Kvasetice (114)
- Lovčice (44)
- Mlynářovice (28)
- Nová Plánice (59)
- Pohoří (44)
- Štipoklasy (105)
- Vracov (0)
- Zbyslav (68)
- Zdebořice (63)

Mlynářovice forms an exclave of the municipal territory.

== Etymology ==
The name is a diminutive form of pláně, which means 'plains' in Czech.

== Geography ==
Plánice is located about 13 kilometres (8 mi) east of Klatovy and 38 km (24 mi) south of Plzeň. It lies in the Blatná Uplands. The highest point is the hill Rovná at 724 m (2,375 ft) above sea level. The town is situated on the left bank of the Úslava River. There are several small fishponds in the municipal territory.

== History ==
The first written mention of Plánice is from 1144, when it was property of the newly established monastery of Pomuk. As a town, Plánice was first mentioned in 1329. During its history, the town was owned by the noble families of Schwamberg, Sternberg, Rožmitál and Martinic.

== Demographics ==
Historical population

| Year | Pop. | ±% |
|---|---|---|
| 1869 | 4,448 | — |
| 1880 | 4,525 | +1.7% |
| 1890 | 4,584 | +1.3% |
| 1900 | 4,381 | −4.4% |
| 1910 | 4,482 | +2.3% |

| Year | Pop. | ±% |
|---|---|---|
| 1921 | 4,268 | −4.8% |
| 1930 | 3,817 | −10.6% |
| 1950 | 2,610 | −31.6% |
| 1961 | 2,639 | +1.1% |
| 1970 | 2,229 | −15.5% |

| Year | Pop. | ±% |
|---|---|---|
| 1980 | 1,903 | −14.6% |
| 1991 | 1,762 | −7.4% |
| 2001 | 1,677 | −4.8% |
| 2011 | 1,660 | −1.0% |
| 2021 | 1,529 | −7.9% |

Source: Censuses

== Transport ==
There are no railways or major roads passing through the municipality.

== Sights ==
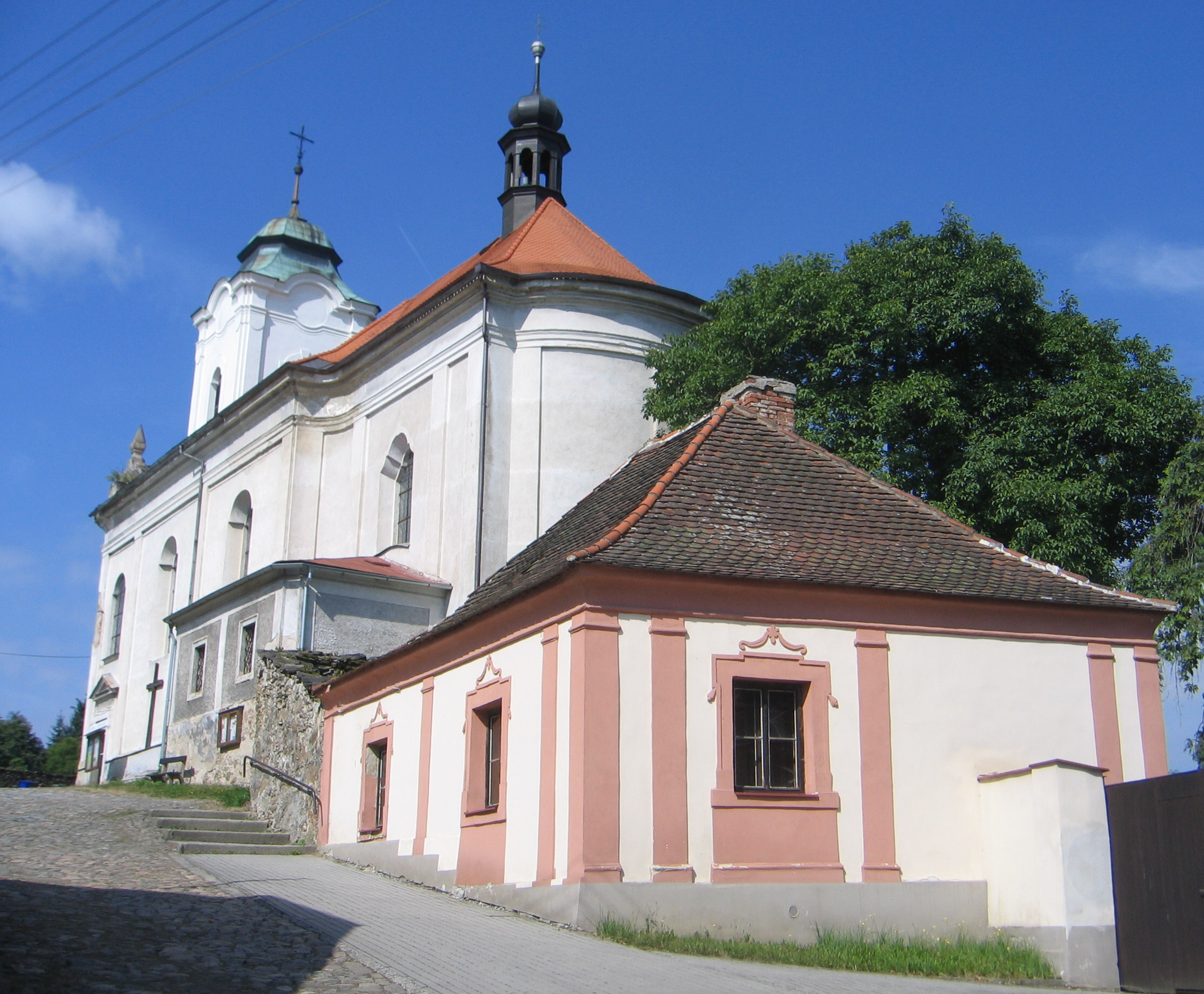
Church of Saint Blaise

The main landmark of Plánice is the Church of Saint Blaise. The original Gothic church was first documented in 1352. It was demolished and in 1755–1757, it was replaced by the current Baroque building. It was built by the architect Anselmo Lurago, probably according to the plans of Kilian Ignaz Dientzenhofer.

Plánice Castle was originally a fortress, built in the second half of the 16th century. At the beginning of the 18th century, it was rebuilt into the early Baroque castle. Today it is owned by the town and inaccessible to the public.

== Notable people ==
- Karel Svoboda (1824–1870), painter
- František Křižík (1847–1941), engineer and inventor
- Vladimír Helfert (1886–1945), musicologist
- Marcela Joglová (born 1987), athlete

== Twin towns – sister cities ==
Plánice is twinned with:

- Rubigen, Switzerland
