= Otakar Ostrčil =

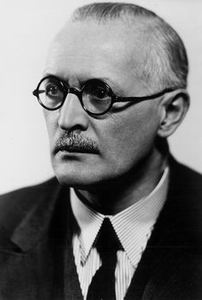
Otakar Ostrčil

Otakar Ostrčil (25 February 1879 in Prague – 20 August 1935 in Prague) was a Czech composer and conductor. He is noted for symphonic works Impromptu, Suite in C Minor, and Symfonietta, and in his opera compositions Poupě and Honzovo království.

== Compositional career ==
Ostrčil was born, and spent his entire life, in Prague, the center of the Czech musical community of his generation. He studied philosophy at Charles University, attending the classes of Otakar Hostinský, and simultaneously studied composition and music theory privately under Zdeněk Fibich. From his early student days he was a close friend of Zdeněk Nejedlý, whose outspoken voice in musicology formed Ostrčil's greatest critical support. He worked as a conductor at the Vinohrady Theater (1914–1919) and later at the National Theatre (Prague) (1920–1935), which was one of the most influential positions in Czech musical life. He also worked as a pedagogue at the Prague Conservatory, teaching conducting.

Ostrčil wrote six operas: Jan Zhořelecký (written as a student under Fibich, 1898, unperformed), Vlasty skon (Vlasta's passing, premiered 1904, to a libretto previously considered by Smetana and Fibich), Kunálovy oči (Kunál's eyes, 1908), Poupě (The Bud, 1912), Legenda z Erinu (A Legend of Erin, 1921), and Honzovo království (Honzo's Kingdom, based on a short story by Leo Tolstoy, 1934). His most significant orchestral music includes Symphony in A (1906), Impromptu (1912), Suite in c minor (1914), Symfonietta (1922), Léto (Summer, tone poem, 1927), and Křížova cesta (The Way of the Cross, orchestral variations, 1929). He also composed various works for chamber and choral ensembles. As was the case with his main musical influence, Gustav Mahler, his rigorous conducting schedule rarely allowed free time for composition, with the exception of the summers when the theater was not in season.

== Influences ==
Like his contemporaries, Vítězslav Novák, Josef Suk, and Otakar Zich, Ostrčil composed in a densely orchestrated, thickly contrapuntal style that was heavily influenced by Mahler, Richard Strauss, and the early works of Arnold Schoenberg. At times, the extreme linearity of his work (as in the orchestral preludes to Legenda z Erinu and the climactic sections of Křížova cesta) goes beyond functional harmony; in these moments he can easily be aligned with the Viennese expressionists, whom he much admired. At the very end of his career, with his final opera Honzovo království, he turned to an ironic sort of neoclassicism reminiscent of Paul Hindemith or even Dmitri Shostakovich: the work is full of grotesque marches and folk dances that match the socialist politics of the libretto's mock folktale atmosphere.

As a conductor, Ostrčil had a significant influence on his younger contemporaries in the interwar period. From the beginning of his time at the National Theater he conceived new ideas of musical leadership and choice of repertoire, wherein representatives of the current generation of musical modernism, both at home and abroad, were presented to Prague audiences as a matter of cultural responsibility. As a result, under Ostrčil, Prague saw the Czech premieres of works by Debussy, Strauss, Stravinsky, Darius Milhaud, Zich, and most importantly, the opera Wozzeck by Alban Berg in 1926.

These programming choices met extreme controversy over Ostrčil's fifteen-year administration at the National Theater, especially from conservative critics such as Antonín Šilhan, who branded the conductor an anti-Czech pro-communist traitor, and whose articles prompted a riot at the third performance of Wozzeck. Many of these criticisms had to do with Ostrčil's close association with Nejedlý, who by this time was a strong proponent of the Czechoslovak Communist Party. It was Ostrčil's belief in the necessity of presenting modern art to the public that won him many supporters among the students of Prague, led by the young pedagogue and microtonal composer Alois Hába; in a climate increasingly unsympathetic to modernist exploration, the conductor was hailed as a hero.

His untimely death in 1935, at the height of his career, was a bitter blow to the community, and for the remainder of the democratic era (to 1938) his achievements were continually rhapsodized in print.

== Works ==
Operas

- Rybáři (fragment)
- Jan Zhořelecký (1898)
- Cymbelín (1899 - unfinished)
- Vlasty skon, Op. 5 (1903)
- Kunálovy oči, Op. 11 (1908) on the theme from the short story of Julius Zeyer.
- Poupě, Op. 12 (1910)
- Legenda z Erinu, Op. 19 (1919)
- Honzovo království, Op. 25 (Honza's Kingdom after Leo Tolstoy 1933)

Melodramas and Orchestral Songs

- Krásné dědictví (Eliška Krásnohorská - destroyed)
- Kamenný mnich (1893)
- Lilie (Karel Jaromír Erben)
- Balada o mrtvém ševci a mladé tanečnici, Op. 6 (K. Leger - 1904)
- Balada česká, Op. 8 (Jan Neruda - 1903)
- Osiřelo dítě, Op. 9 (The Orphan's Tale, 1907)
- Cizí Host, Op. 16 (The Stranger, 1913)
- Skřivan, Op. 26 (Mir. Valenta - 1934)

Orchestral works

- Selská Slavnost, Op. 1 (Peasant Festival, 1897)
- Pohádková Suita, Op. 2 (Fairy Tale Suite, 1898)
- Pohádka o Šemíku, Op. 3 (Tale of Šemík, tone poem, 1899)
- Symphony in A, Op. 7 (1906)
- Sirotek, Op. 10 (The Orphan, incidental music for play after Nemcova, 1906)
- Impromptu, Op. 13 (1912)
- Suite in c minor, Op. 14 (1912)
- Sinfonietta, Op. 20 (1922)
- Léto, Op. 23 (Summer, tone poem, 1927)
- Křížova cesta Variations for Large Orchestra, Op. 24 (1928) (Calvary or The Way of the Cross)

Choral works

- Ceská Legenda Vánocní, Op. 15 (Czech Christmas Legend, 1912)
- Legenda o sv. Zite Cantata, Op. 17 text by Jaroslava Vrchlického (1913)
- Prosté Motivy, Op. 21 (1922)

Chamber music

- String Quartet in B Major, Op. 4 (1899)
- Sonatina for Viola, Violin and Piano, Op. 22 (1925)

Songs

- 3 Songs, Op. 18 (1910-1913)
