= Vladimír Helfert =

Czech musicologist and university educator

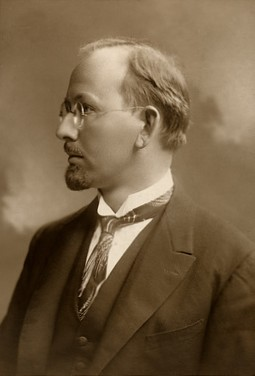
Helfert in 1930

Vladimír Helfert (24 March 1886 – 18 March 1945) was a Czech musicologist and university educator.

== Life ==
Vladimír Helfert was born on 24 March 1886 in Plánice. Although his early career as a music critic was clouded by the negative influence of his teacher, Zdeněk Nejedlý, with whom he studied at Charles University. After accepting a post in 1922 as professor of musicology at Masaryk University in Brno, he went against Nejedlý's teachings and championed the music of Leoš Janáček.

His greatest work, Česká moderní hudba. Studie o české hudební tvořivosti (Czech Modern Music: A study of Czech musical creativity, 1936), came under public attack by Nejedlý and his remaining followers. During the Nazi Germany occupation, Helfert became involved with the underground Czechoslovak Communist Party and was arrested for resistance activities.

He was interned in Brno's Špilberk Castle by the Gestapo in 1939, and subsequently in Wrocław until 1942. After convalescing, he was arrested again in 1944, and held in Pankrác Prison in Prague-Pankrác and finally the Theresienstadt Ghetto. His health did not survive the trip back to Prague after liberation. He died in Prague on 18 March 1945.
