= Zdeněk Fibich =

Czech composer (1850–1900)

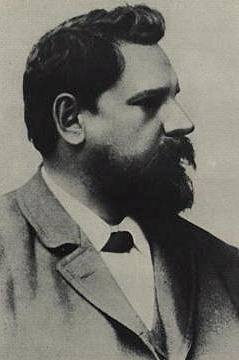
- Zdeněk Fibich
- Born: 21 December 1850; Všebořice, Bohemia, Austrian Empire
- Died: 15 October 1900 (aged 49); Prague, Bohemia, Austria-Hungary
- Occupation: Composer

Zdeněk Fibich (Czech pronunciation: [ˈzdɛɲɛk ˈfɪbɪx], 21 December 1850 in Všebořice – 15 October 1900 in Prague) was a Czech composer of classical music. Among his compositions are chamber works (including two string quartets, a piano trio, piano quartet and a quintet for piano, strings and winds), symphonic poems, three symphonies, at least seven operas (the most famous probably Šárka and The Bride of Messina), melodramas including the substantial trilogy Hippodamia, liturgical music including a mass – a missa brevis; and a large cycle (a total of 376 pieces, from the 1890s) of piano works called Moods, Impressions, and Reminiscences. The piano cycle served as a diary of sorts of his love for a piano pupil, and one of the pieces formed the basis for the short instrumental work Poème, for which Fibich is best remembered today.

== Early life and education ==
That Fibich is far less known than either Antonín Dvořák or Bedřich Smetana can be explained by the fact that he lived during the rise of Czech nationalism within the Habsburg Empire. While Smetana and Dvořák gave themselves over entirely to the national cause, consciously writing Czech music with which the emerging nation strongly identified, Fibich's position was more ambivalent. This was due to the background of his parents and to his education. Fibich's father was a Czech forestry official and the composer's early life was spent on various wooded estates of the nobleman for whom his father worked. His mother, however, was an ethnic German Viennese. She started teaching him how to play the piano when he was six years old. Home schooled by his mother until the age of nine, he was first sent to a German-speaking gymnasium in Vienna for two years before attending a Czech-speaking gymnasium in Prague where he stayed until he was 15. After this he was sent to Leipzig where he remained for three years studying piano with Ignaz Moscheles and composition with Salomon Jadassohn and Ernst Richter. After the better part of a year in Paris, Fibich concluded his studies with Vinzenz Lachner (the younger brother of Franz and Ignaz Lachner) in Mannheim. Fibich spent the next few years living with his parents back in Prague where he composed his first opera Bukovina, based on a libretto of Karel Sabina, the librettist of Smetana's The Bartered Bride.

== Personal life ==
At the age of 23, he married Růžena Hanušová and took up residence in the Lithuanian city of Vilnius. where he had obtained a position of choirmaster. After spending two unhappy years there (his wife and newly born twins both died in Vilnius), he returned to Prague in 1874 and remained there until his death in 1900. In 1875 Fibich married Růžena's sister, the operatic contralto Betty Fibichová (née Hanušová), but left her in 1895 for his former student and lover Anežka Schulzová. The relationship between Schulzová and Fibich was important to him artistically, since she wrote the libretti for all his later operas including Šárka, but also served as the inspiration for his Moods, Impressions, and Reminiscences.

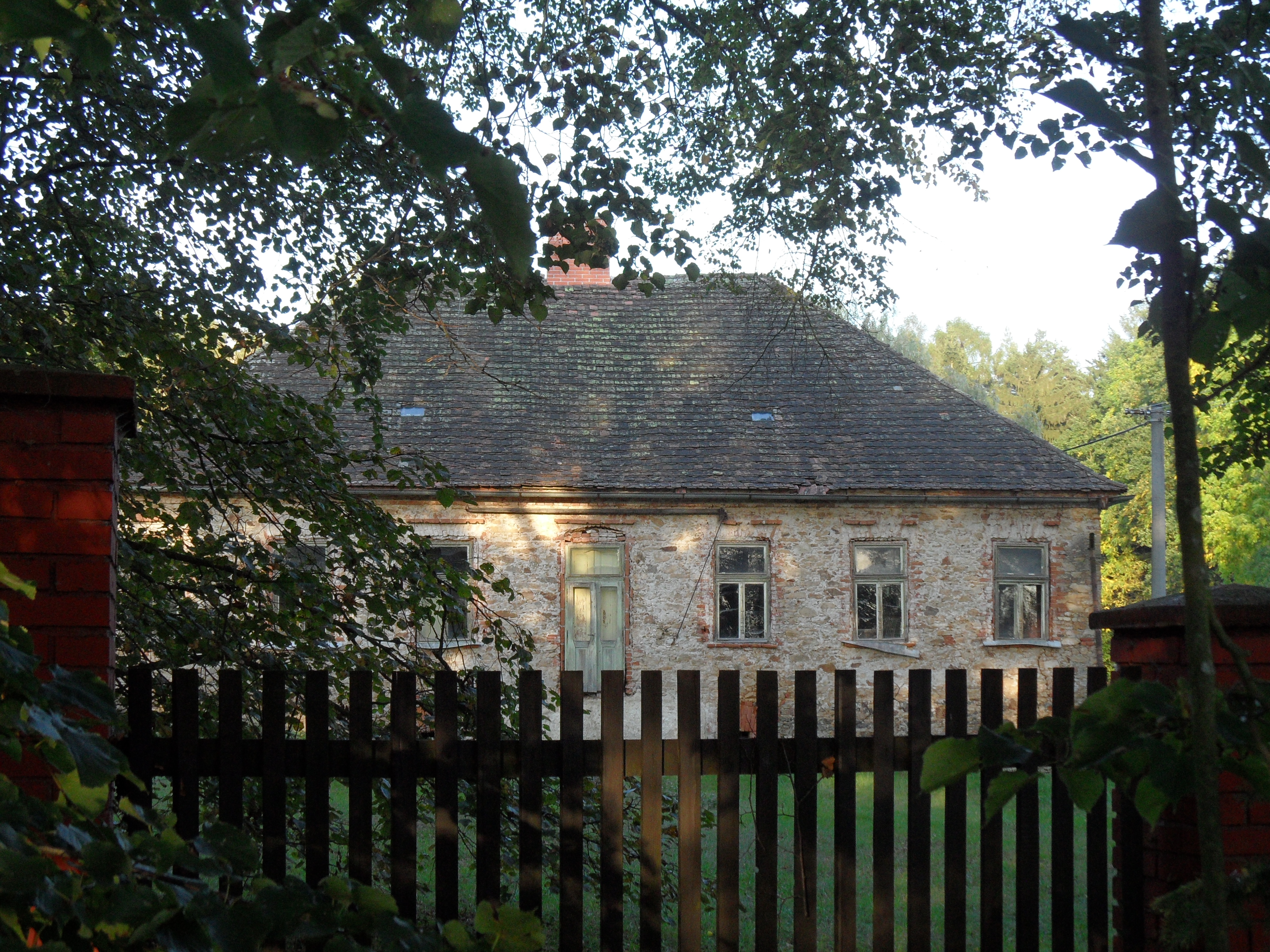
Birthplace of Zdeněk Fibich

== Career ==
Fibich was given a bi-cultural education, living during his formative early years in Germany, France and Austria in addition to his native Bohemia. He was fluent in German as well as Czech. In his instrumental works, Fibich generally wrote in the vein of the German romantics, first falling under the influence of Weber, Mendelssohn and Schumann and later Wagner. His early operas and close to 200 of his early songs are in German. These works along with his symphonies and chamber music won considerable praise from German critics, though not from Czechs. The bulk of Fibich's operas are in Czech, although many are based on non-Czech sources such as Shakespeare, Schiller and Byron. In his chamber music, more than anywhere else, Fibich makes use of Bohemian folk melodies and dance rhythms such as the dumka. Fibich was the first to write a Czech nationalist tone poem (Záboj, Slavoj a Luděk) which served as the inspiration for Smetana's Má vlast. He was also the first to use the polka in a chamber work, his quartet in A.

=== Criticisms from Prague's musical community ===
After his return to Prague in 1874, Fibich's music encountered severely negative reactions in the Prague musical community, stemming from his (and Smetana's) adherence to Richard Wagner's theories on opera. While Smetana's later career was plagued with problems for presenting Wagnerian-style music dramas in Czech before a conservative audience, Fibich's pugilistic music criticism, not to mention his overtly Wagnerian later operas, Hedy, Šárka, and Pád Arkuna, exacerbated the problem in the years after Smetana's death in 1884. Together with the music aesthetician Otakar Hostinský, he was ostracized from the musical establishment at the National Theatre and Prague Conservatory and forced to rely on his private composition studio. The studio nevertheless was well respected among students, drawing such names as Emanuel Chvála, Karel Kovařovic, Otakar Ostrčil, and Zdeněk Nejedlý, the notorious critic and subsequent politician. See: List of music students by teacher: C to F#Zdeněk Fibich. Much of the reception of Fibich's music in the early twentieth century is a result of these students' efforts after their teacher's death, especially in Nejedlý's highly polemical campaigns enacted in a series of monographs and articles that sought to redress what he considered to be past inequities. Although this served to bring Fibich's music to greater attention, subsequent scholarship has had to deal with the spectre of Nejedlý's intensely personal bias.

There is a Fibich Society which has organized projects such as Vladimir Hudec's Thematic Catalog (below) and much else.

== Works ==
Fibich's best-known work, Poème, began life as an unnamed piano piece (no. 139 in D flat) in his cycle Moods, Impressions and Reminiscences. He reused the material in his symphonic idyll At Twilight from where it was adapted after his death by the violinist Jan Kubelik and given the title Poème. This has been published and recorded in numerous arrangements, one of which was My Moonlight Madonna to English lyrics by Paul Francis Webster. In 1933 the tune was popularly harmonized by William Scotti.

== Bibliography ==
- Hudec, Vladimír. Zdeněk Fibich. Prague: SPN, t. MTZ, Olomouc, 1971.
- Hudec, Vladimír. Zdenek Fibich. Tematicky katalog / Thematisches Verzeichnis. Prague: Editio Bärenreiter, 2002. ISBN 80-86385-10-8. pp. 850. Thematic catalogue, text in Czech, German and English.
- Jiránek, Jaroslav. Zdenek Fibich. Prague: Státní hudební vydavatelství, 1963.
- Some of this information is paraphrased from the Fibich entry in the Oxford Concise Dictionary of Music (Michael Kennedy, ed., 4th ed., 1996, revised 2004. ISBN 0-19-860884-5. Oxford, New York, Oxford University Press) and from reviews of recordings of the works listed in music journals (especially the Moods, Impressions and Reminiscences cycle.)
- Opolis, Renz. Zdenek Fibich-The Chamber Music, The Chamber Music Journal, ISSN 1535-1726, Vol.XVI Nos.1–3, 2005, Riverwoods, Illinois (The author & The Chamber Music Journal have released the above information which appears in their article under the terms of the GNU License. Some of this information also appears on the website of Edition Silvertrust)
- Locke, Brian S. Opera and Ideology in Prague: Polemics and Practice at the National Theater, 1900–1938 (Rochester, N.Y.: Boydell & Brewer, 2006)
