= List of people from Prague =

Prague, the capital of today's Czech Republic, has been for over a thousand years the centre and the biggest city of the Czech lands. Notable people who were born or died, studied, lived or saw their success in Prague are listed below.

== Arts ==
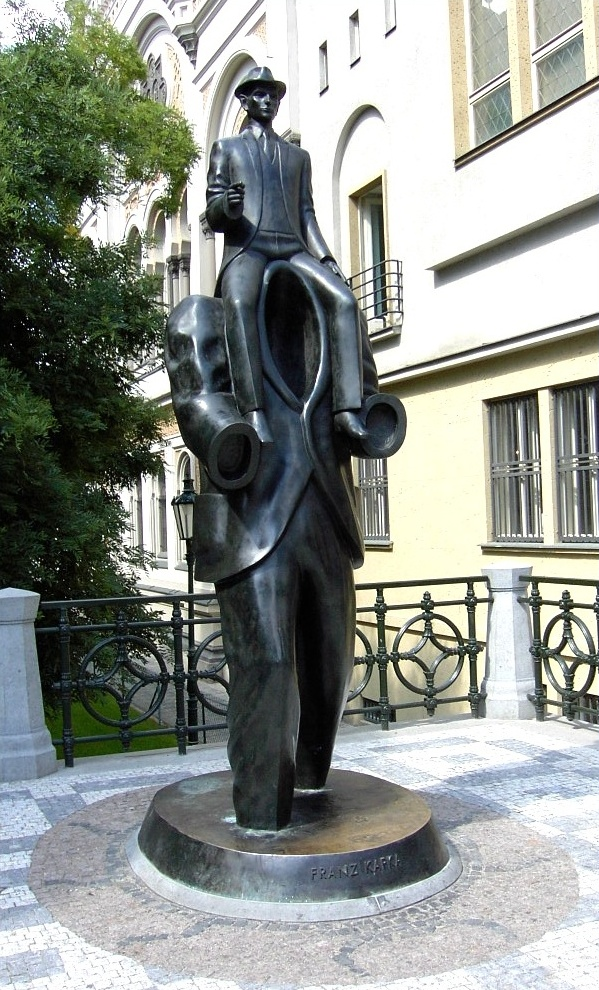
Monument to Franz Kafka (Prague, August 2004)

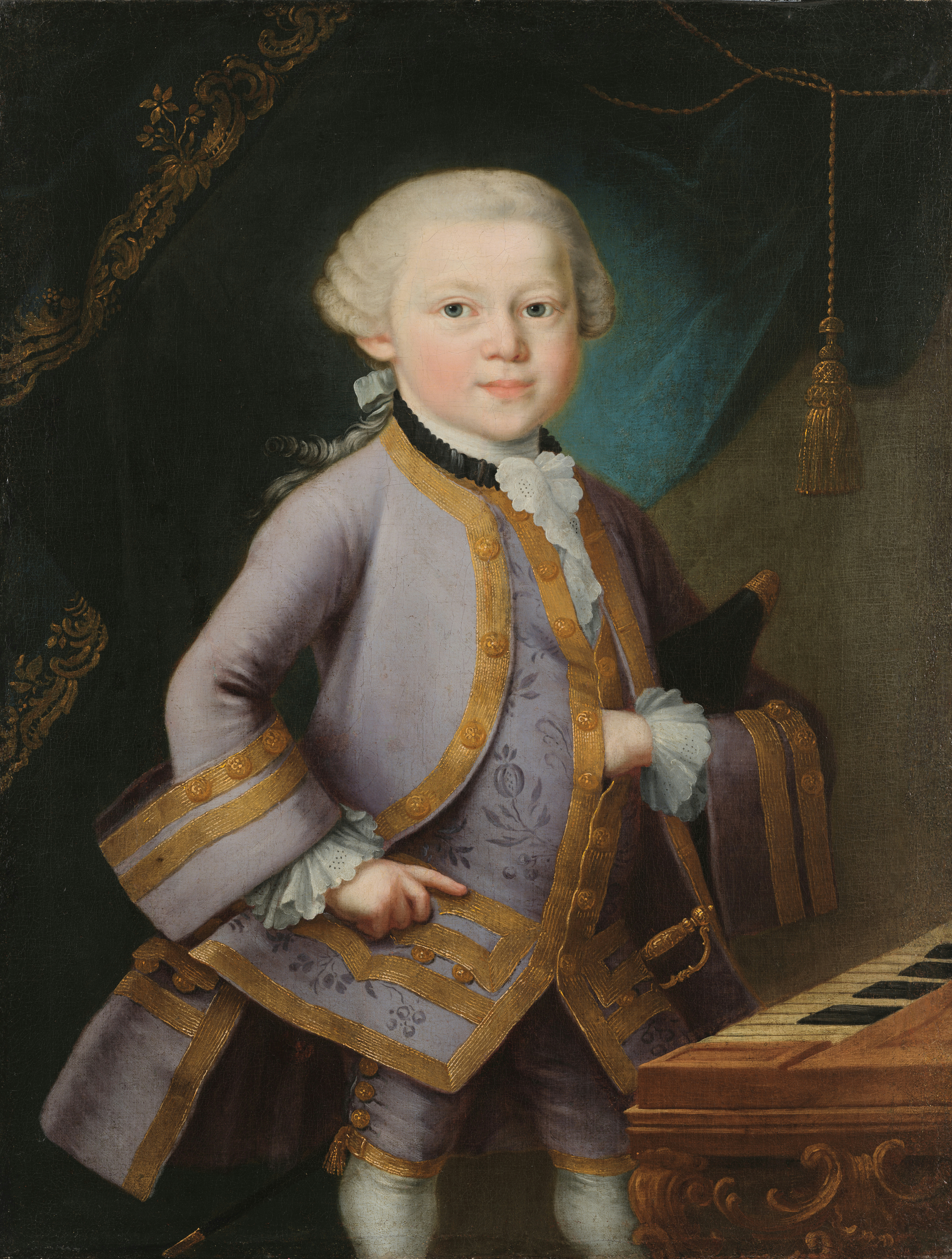
Portrait of a young Wolfgang Amadeus Mozart

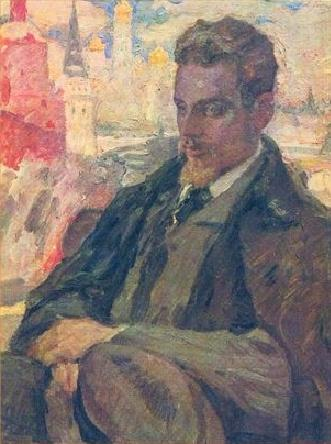
A portrait of Rainer Maria Rilke painted two years after his death by Leonid Pasternak

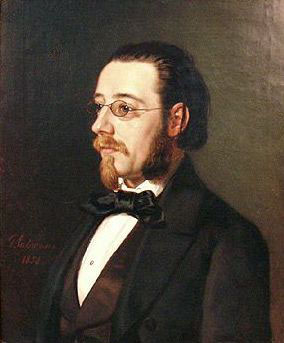
An oil portrait of Smetana, 1854, by Geskel Saloman

- H. G. Adler (1910–1988), German-language writer; born and lived in Prague
- Filip Albrecht (born 1977), lyricist, film producer, writer; lives in Prague
- Jana Andrsová (1939–2023), actress and ballerina; born and lived in Prague
- Lída Baarová (1914–2000), actress; lived and died in Prague
- Jana Brejchová (1940–2026), film actress; born and died in Prague
- Max Brod (1884–1968), German-language writer; born and lived in Prague
- Charlotta Burešová (1904–1983), painter and Holocaust survivor
- Karel Čapek (1890–1938), writer; lived and died in Prague
- Jan Cina (born 1988), actor and singer
- Gene Deitch (1924–2020), American-born animator; lived in Prague
- Emmy Destinn (1878–1930), operatic soprano; born in Prague
- Antonín Dvořák (1841–1904), composer; lived most of his life in Prague
- Miloš Forman (1932–2018), film director, won twice Academy Award for Best Director; studied and lived in Prague
- Pavla Fořtová-Šámalová (1886–1974), painter and art historian
- Karel Gott (1939–2019), singer; lived in Prague
- Jaroslav Hašek (1883–1923), writer, humorist and satirist; lived in Prague for most of his life, described the city in many stories
- Auguste Hauschner (1850–1924), German writer, born in Prague
- Václav Havel (1936–2011), dramatist, writer and politician; President of Czechoslovakia and Czech republic (its first; 1993–2003); born and lived in Prague
- Maxim Havlíček, painter; born in Prague
- Karel Heřmánek (1947–2024), actor; born in Prague
- Vladimír Holan (1905–1980), poet; born, lived and died in Prague
- Bohumil Hrabal (1914–1997), writer; lived and died in Prague
- Leoš Janáček (1854–1928), composer; studied in Prague
- Fanny Janauschek (1830–1904), actress; migrated to the United States in 1867
- Ludmila Janovská (1907 – after 1962), painter; lived in Prague
- Franz Kafka (1883–1924), German-language fiction writer; born and lived in Prague
- Tomas Kalnoky (born 1980), guitarist, singer; born in Prague
- Gertrud Kauders (1883–1942), artist; born in Prague
- Egon Erwin Kisch (1885–1948), German-language journalist and writer; born, lived, and died in Prague
- Stefan Kisyov (born 1963), novelist; lives in Prague
- Ivan Klíma (1931–2025), novelist and playwright; born in Prague
- Daria Klimentová (born 1971), ballet dancer; born and raised in Prague
- Paul Kornfeld (1889–1942), German-language playwright and novelist; born and lived in Prague
- Ivan Kral (1948–2020), guitarist, singer, record producer and film director; born in Prague
- Milan Kundera (1929–2023), writer; studied, lectured at the Academy of Performing Arts in Prague
- Master of the Chudenice Altarpiece, painter active in Prague at the turn of the late Gothic and early Renaissance
- Leopold Eugen Měchura (1804–1870), composer
- Jiří Menzel (1938–2020), film director (his first feature film, Closely Watched Trains (1966) won the Academy Award for Best Foreign Language Film); born in Prague
- Wolfgang Amadeus Mozart (1756–1791), composer; some of his best opera successes were during his time in Prague
- Alfons Mucha (1860–1939), Art Nouveau painter and decorative artist; spent last decades of his life in Prague
- Josef Václav Myslbek (1848–1922), sculptor; born in Prague and creator of the Wenceslas Monument in Prague's Wenceslas Square
- Zuzana Navarová (1959–2004), singer; lived and died in Prague
- Jože Plečnik (1872–1957), Slovene architect; built several churches and parts of the Prague Castle
- Rainer Maria Rilke (1875–1926), German-language poet; born and studied in Prague
- Karel Roden (born 1962), actor; lives in Prague
- Jan Saudek (born 1935), art photographer; born and lives in Prague
- Jaroslav Seifert (1901–1986), poet and recipient of the Nobel Prize in Literature (1984); lived in Prague
- Anna Slováčková (1995–2025), actress and singer. Born, lived and died in Prague.
- Bedřich Smetana (1824–1884), composer; lived and died in Prague
- Kamila Špráchalová (born 1971), stage and television actress
- Jiří Suchý (born 1931), actor, singer, playwright, writer; born and lives in Prague
- Bertha von Suttner (1843–1914), novelist, pacifist activist and writer, recipient of the Nobel Peace Prize (1905)
- Lubor Těhník (1926–1987), ceramist
- Johannes Urzidil (1896–1970), German-language writer; born and lived in Prague, described the city in many stories (The Lost Beloved, 1956, Prague Triptych, 1960)
- Romana Vaccaro (1956–2024), opera singer
- Marja Vallila (1950–2018), sculptor
- Robert Vano (born 1948), art photographer; lives in Prague
- Felix Weltsch (1884–1964), German-language writer; born and lived in Prague
- Robert Weltsch (1891–1982), German-language journalist; born and lived in Prague
- Franz Werfel (1890–1945), German-language writer; born and lived in Prague
- Jan Werich (1905–1980), actor, singer, playwright, writer; born, lived and died in Prague
- Walter Trier (1890–1951), illustrator; born in Prague
- Dana Zámečníková (born 1945), sculptor, born in Prague
- Zdenka Ziková (1902–1990), opera singer; born in Prague

== Politics ==
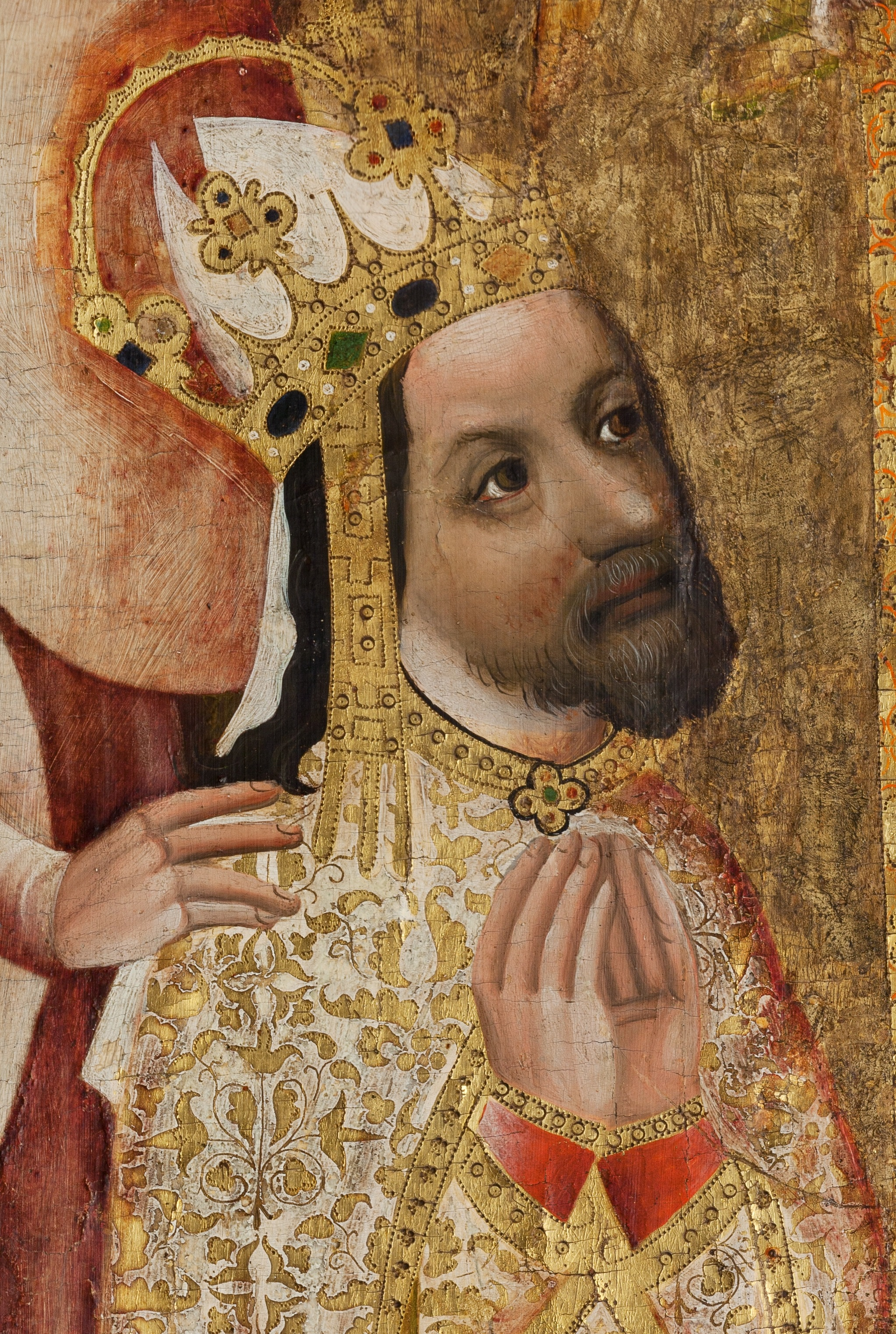
Charles IV in the Votive Panel of Jan Očko of Vlašim

- Karel Baxa (1863–1938), politician; mayor of Prague for almost two decades
- Adolph Aloys von Braun (1818–1904), diplomat and statesman
- Charles IV (1316–1378), Holy Roman Emperor; under his rule the Charles University in Prague was established and the Charles Bridge was built; made the city his main seat of government
- Charles Fried (1935–2024), United States Solicitor General, 1985–89
- Reinhard Heydrich (1904–1942), Nazi general and protector; assassinated in Prague during Operation Anthropoid while serving as governor of the occupied country
- Pyotra Krecheuski (1879–1928), Belarusian statesman and president of the Rada of the Belarusian Democratic Republic in exile; died in Prague
- Tomáš Garrigue Masaryk (1850–1937), philosopher, politician; lived in Prague for a substantial part of his life
- Rudolf II (1552–1612), Holy Roman Emperor; made the city the capital of the Habsburg Empire; attracted both scientists and charlatans to Prague
- Vasil Zacharka (1877–1943), Belarusian statesman and the second president of the Belarusian Democratic Republic in exile; died in Prague
- Jan Žižka (ca. 1360–1424), general and Hussite leader; participated in start of the rebellion in Prague, later defended the city against Crusaders in the first anti-Hussite crusade of the Hussite Wars

== Science and academia ==
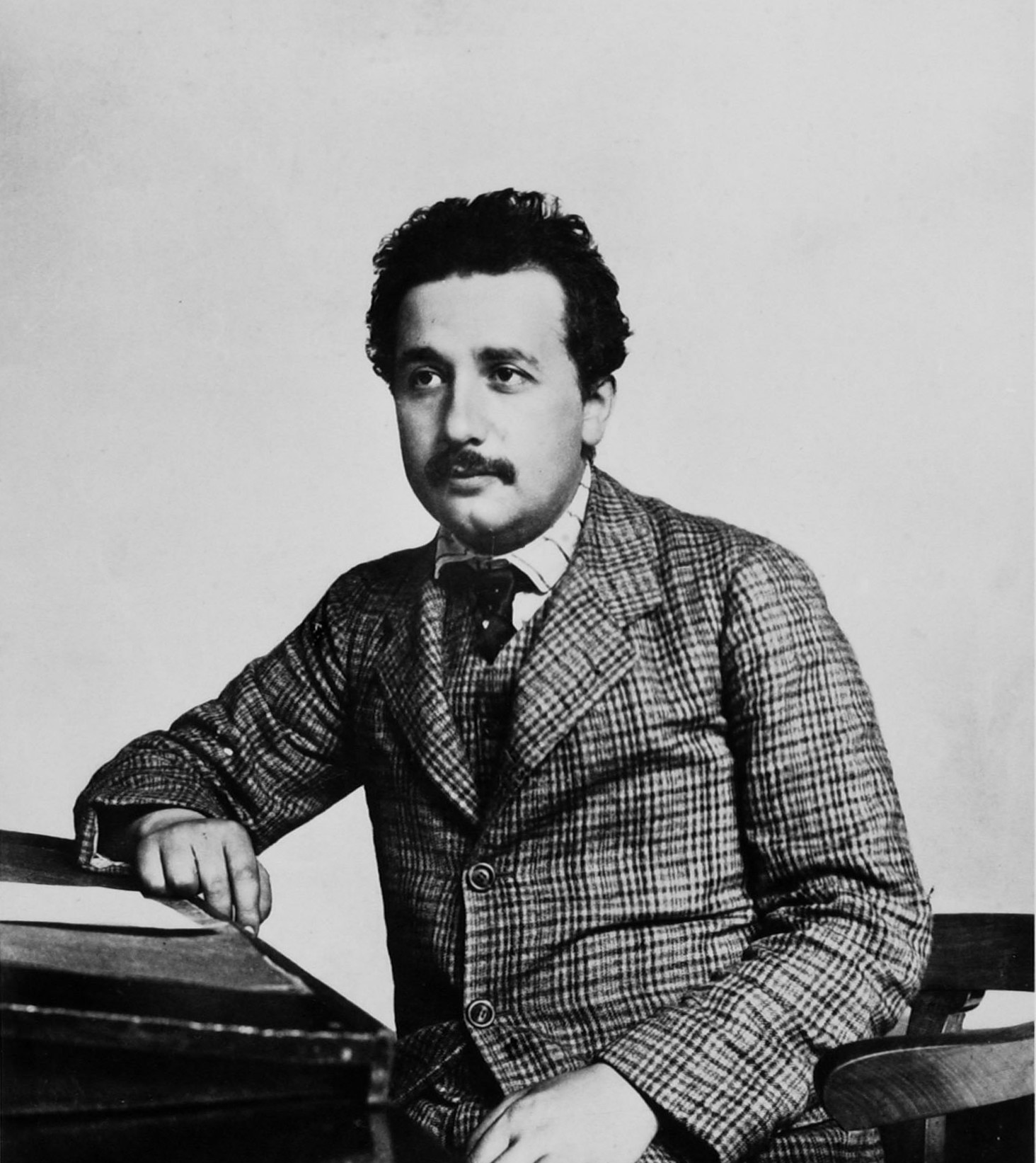
Albert Einstein

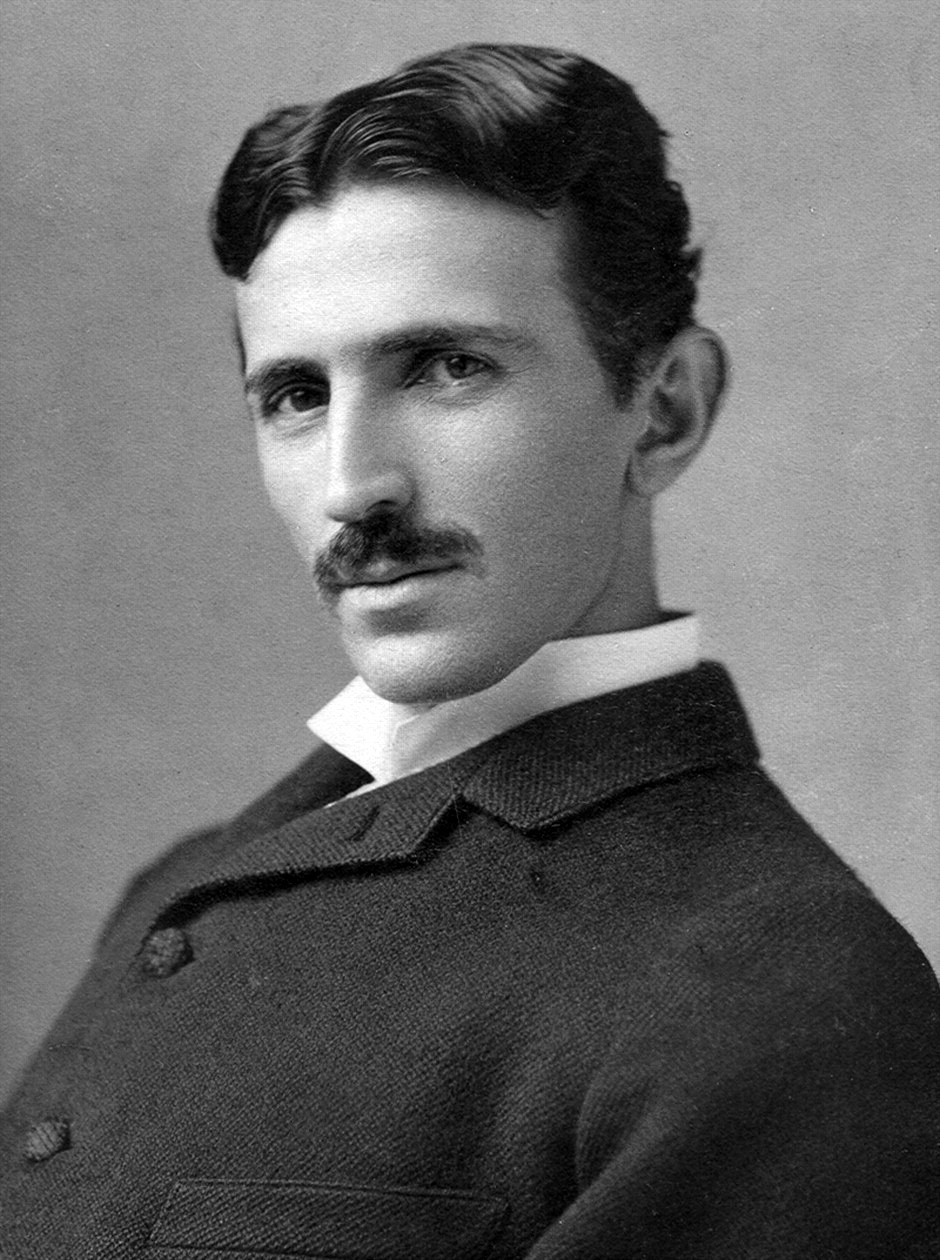
Nikola Tesla (1856–1943)

- Vladimir Balthasar (1897–1978), entomologist, naturalist and ornithologist
- Bernard Bolzano (1781–1848), mathematician, logician, philosopher, Catholic theologian
- Tycho Brahe (1546–1601), astronomer; spent end of life near Prague
- Carl Ferdinand Cori (1896–1984), biochemist, recipient of the Nobel Prize in Physiology or Medicine (1947)
- Gerty Cori (1896–1957), biochemist, recipient of the Nobel Prize in Physiology or Medicine (1947)
- Karl Deutsch (1912–1992), social scientist, political scientist
- Albert Einstein (1879–1955), physicist, served as professor at the German part of the Charles University in Prague (1911–1912)
- Philipp Frank (1884–1966), physicist, mathematician, and philosopher
- Heinrich Jacob Goldschmidt (1857– 1937), chemist; borin in Prague
- Jaroslav Heyrovský (1890–1967), chemist; inventor of the polarographic method and recipient of the Nobel Prize in Chemistry (1959); born, lived most of his life and died in Prague
- Antonín Holý (1936–2012), chemist, pharmacologist
- Jan Janský (1873–1921), serologist, neurologist, psychiatrist
- Jerome of Prague (1379–1416), scholastic philosopher, theologian, reformer, and professor
- Johannes Kepler (1571–1630), astronomer; in 1601, he succeeded Tycho Brahe as imperial mathematician and the next eleven years lectured for several years in Prague and published his paper on Doppler effect there
- Eva Smolková-Keulemansová (née Weilová; 1927–2024), analytical chemistry scientist and Holocaust survivor; born in Prague
- Enoch Heinrich Kisch (1841–1918), balneologist
- Felix Kolmer (1922–2022), physicist, Holocaust survivor; born in Prague
- Gertrud Kornfeld (1891–1955) , chemist, born in Prague
- František Křižík (1847–1941), inventor, electrical engineer and entrepreneur, set up his company in Prague
- Lubomír Linhart (1906–1980), Czech film historian, critic and photography theorist
- Charles Loewner (1893–1968), mathematician
- Jan Patočka (1907–1977), philosopher; born, lived and died in Prague
- Anna Řeháková (1850–1937), teacher, writer and translator
- Eliška Řeháková (1846–1916), teacher, translator, journalist and suffragist
- David Scheffel, former professor and anthropologist, born in Prague
- Emil Starkenstein (1884–1942), professor, pharmacologist, and one of the founders of clinical pharmacology; killed in the Mauthausen-Gusen concentration camp
- Nikola Tesla (1856–1943), inventor and engineer, studied at Charles University in Prague (1880)
- Rudolf Vrba (born Walter Rosenberg; 1924– 2006), biochemist and Holocaust survivor
- Anna Masaryková (1911–1996), art historian

== Sports ==
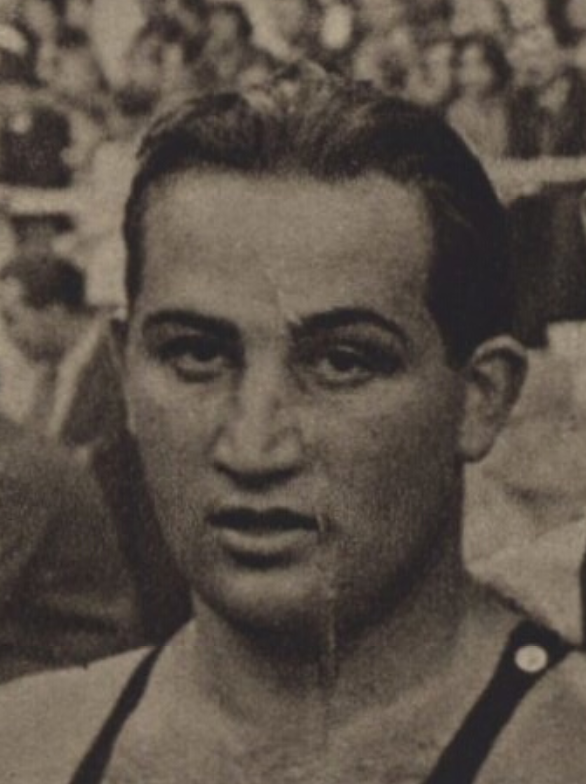
Olympic athlete František Getreuer

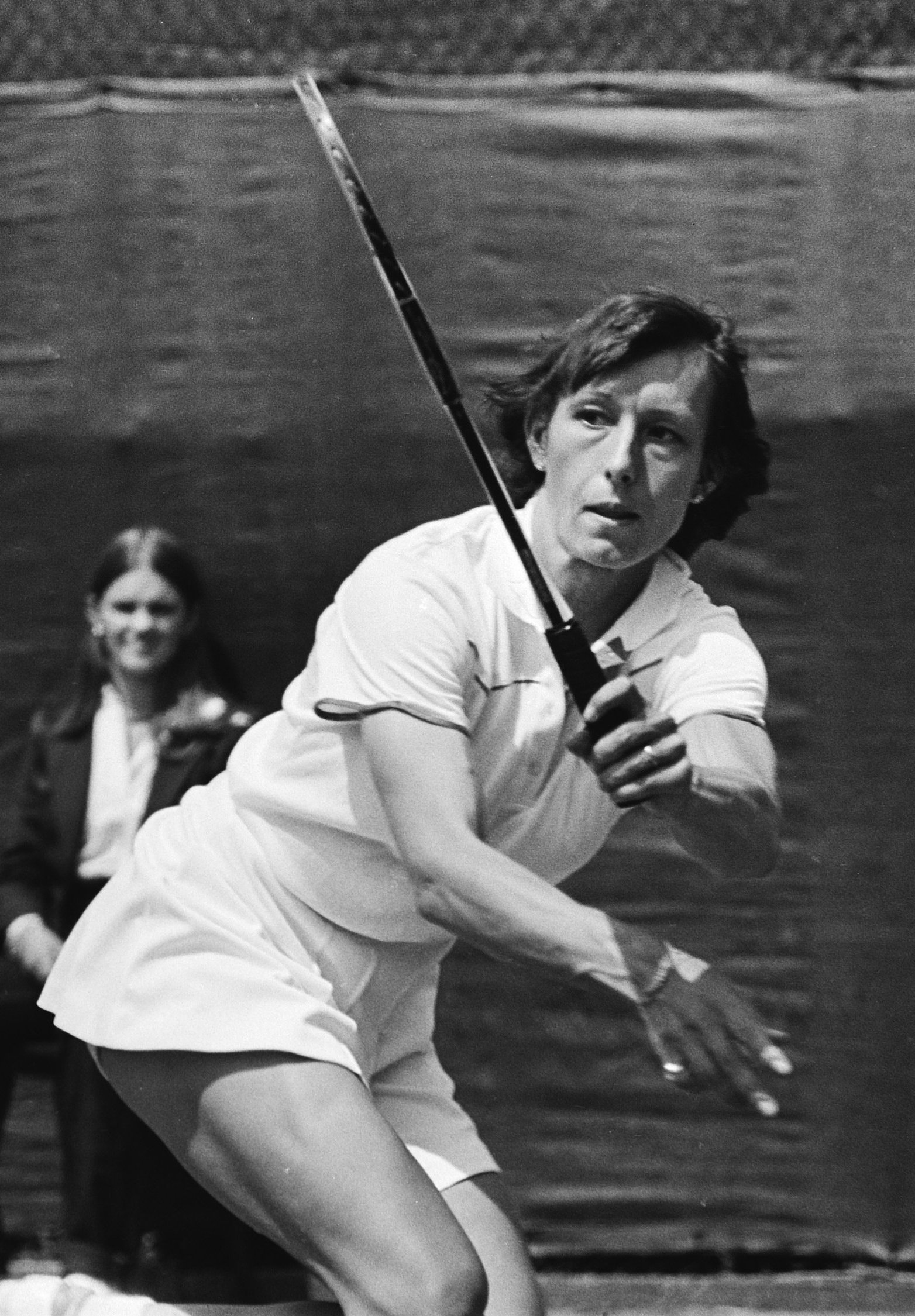
world #1 tennis player Martina Navratilova

- František Getreuer (1906–1945), national champion swimmer and Olympic water polo player, killed in Dachau concentration camp
- Kurt Epstein (1904–1975), water polo player, two-time Olympian, incarcerated at Theresienstadt concentration camp and Auschwitz concentration camp, the remaining members of his family were gassed by the Nazis.
- Radko Gudas (born 1990), NHL ice hockey player
- Karel Hartmann (1885–1944), ice hockey player, Olympic bronze medalist for Czechoslovakia, killed in the Auschwitz concentration camp
- Ladislav Hecht (1909–2004), Czechoslovak-American tennis player, world #6
- Tomáš Hertl (born 1993), NHL ice hockey player; born and raised in Prague
- Jeremy Kelly (born 1997), American footballer; born in Prague
- Gertrude Kleinová (1918–1976), three-time world champion table tennis player, she and her husband were deported to the Theresienstadt concentration camp and then to the Auschwitz concentration camp, where her husband was killed.
- Martina Navratilova (born 1956), tennis player; 18-time Grand Slam champion, world #1, born in Prague
- Pavel Nedvěd (born 1972), footballer; 2003 Ballon d'Or winner; lived and played in Prague
- Felix Pipes (1887–1983), tennis player, Olympic silver medalist
- František Plánička (1904–1996), footballer, captain of the Czechoslovakia national football team
- Hedwig Rosenbaum (1864–1939), tennis player, two-time Olympic bronze medalist; born in Prague
- Tomáš Rosický (born 1980), footballer; born in Prague
- Tomáš Satoranský (born 1991), basketball player in the Israeli Basketball Premier League, formerly in the NBA; born in Prague
- Jan Soukup (born 1979), karateka and kickboxer; born in Prague
- Daniel Vladař (born 1997), NHL ice hockey player; born in Prague
- Jakub Vrána (born 1996), NHL ice hockey player; born and raised in Prague
- Václav Žáček (born 1978), Czech-American personal watercraft extreme sports athlete; born in Prague
- Emil Zátopek (1922–2000), long-distance runner, Olympic winner; lived and died in Prague
- Aneta Tejralová (born 1996), Professional Women's Hockey League ice hockey player; born in Prague

== Other fields ==
- Jan van der Croon (1600–1665), Dutch soldier; military commander of Prague 1652–1665
- Emil Engelmüller (1873–1944), Czech entrepreneur, leatherwork fashion designer, and motor enthusiast
- Eva Erben (born 1930), Czech Israeli writer and Holocaust survivor
- Rabbi Manis Friedman (born 1946), Prague-born American Chabad rabbi, author, and lecturer
- Jan Hus (1369–1415), priest, philosopher, reformer; most-important preaching done in Prague
- Gershom ben Solomon Kohen (died 1544), early printer of Hebrew books and founder of the Gersonides (printers)
- Judah Loew ben Bezalel (1525–1609), Talmudic scholar, Jewish mystic and philosopher; lived most of his life in Prague
