= Kateřina Emingerová =

Czech composer, pianist and music educator (1856–1934)

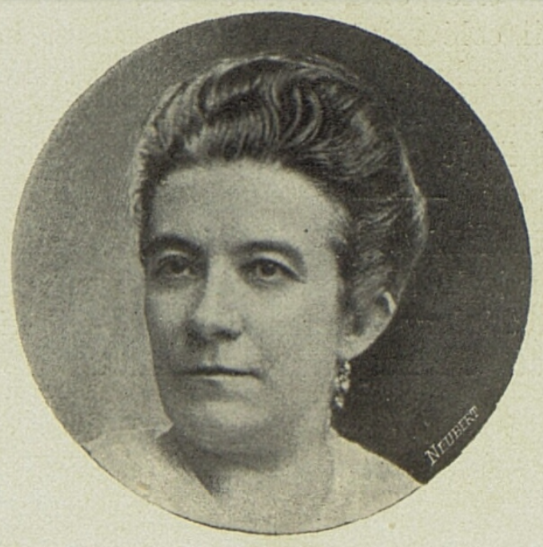
Emingerová in 1911

Kateřina Emingerová (13 July 1856 – 9 September 1934) was a Czech composer, pianist and music educator. She was also a prolific music writer and journalist, producing numerous books, essays, reviews and articles on music.

== Biography ==
Emingerová was born on 13 July 1856 in Prague, the daughter of lawyer Jan Eminger and his wife Julie Emingerová. Kateřina's sister Helena (1858–1943) became known as a painter and graphic artist. Kateřina completed early studies under František Škroup, Bedřich Smetana, Adolf Čech, František Zdeněk Skuherský, Ludevít Procházka, Vojtěch Hřímalý, Jan Hřímalý, Josef Paleček and Viennese tenor Gustav Walter.

She then studied with Josef Jiránek, Karel ze Slavkovských, Ludevít Procházka, and Jindřich Kaan. In Berlin her teacher was Karl-Heinrich Barth at the Hochschule für Musik (1882–1883). She studied composition privately with Zdeněk Fibich and Vítězslav Novák and began composing at the age of thirteen. Emingerová performed her first solo concert at age nineteen in the Konvikt concert hall.

In the 1870s Emingerová began composing dances, especially polkas, which were popular at the Prague balls. She also composed for orchestra, chamber ensembles, choir and solo voice. In 1890 she began work at the Prague Conservatory, first as a student accompanist and then after 1911 as a piano and chamber music professor. She continued working at the Conservatory for thirty-eight years before retiring in 1928.

Emingerová died on 9 September 1934 in Prague. She is buried at the Olšany Cemetery in Prague.

== Writing career ==
Emingerová continued to perform as an accompanist and also began to perform in connection with her lectures on music, some of which were later published in book form and as articles in magazines and newspapers. She prepared and issued print collections of old Czech composers, and in the early 20th century, she began to contribute to Female World, Women's Horizon, Eve and the New Woman, promoting women composers such as Fanny Mendelssohn-Bartholdy, Augusta Mary Anne Holmes, Cécile Chaminade, Johanna Muller-Herrmanová, Lisa Maria Mayer, Ethel Mary Smyth, Mary Lola Beranová-Stark and Florentina Mallá.

Emingerová also contributed articles to the music journals Dalibor, Smetana, and to Czech newspapers including the Prager Presse, National Press and National Policy. She wrote reviews of performances at the National Theatre, Opera Theatre Vinohrady, Czech Philharmonic Orchestra, Chamber Music Society and the Prague Conservatory. She also wrote a number of essays on the music education of children.

Emingerová's papers are held in the library and archives of the Prague Conservatory, the Museum of National Literature, the National Museum and the Czech Museum of Music.

== Musical works ==
Piano works (2 hand):

- Inventions
- Concert Etude
- Reminders (1872)
- Neighborhood
- Mignonette-Polka (1875)
- Ni-Polka (1877–1878)
- Sychrovská Galop (1879)
- Tarantella, Op. 4 (approx. 1882)
- Polka melancholic
- Valse mignonne

Works for piano (4 Hand):

- Festive March (1899)
- Lullaby

Works for violin and piano:

- Polonaise
- Sonata (1881)

Songs for voice and piano:

- An Dich (lyrics Maria Janitschek)
- Weiss das sie ja schon lange
- Frühlingslied (1880)
- Star of Hope (1880)
- Gute Nacht (1889)
- It seemed to me that you 'died (1890)
- Two songs for high voice
- Old-songs (1930)
- Two songs for high voice with piano accompaniment
- Believe me, the bloom on the wings of a butterfly
- How Gem (1883)
- Just watch
- Werners Jung Lied
- People were talking
- Liebeszauber
- The thickness of the eye (1880)
- Prayer (1880)
- In heaven and on earth
- Piper (1896)
- Pilgrim
- Kovařovic Andula (1896)
- You as a dreamy sky
- Evening Song
- Princess Dandelion (1901)

Songs for two voices with piano:

- Three Czech Folksongs (1880)
- I would like
- Duets for Female Voices
- Star and hope (lyrics by Elizabeth Krásnohorská)

Women's choirs:

- Four songs for women's voices (1900)
- Duets for Female Voices
- Svatvečer

Men's choirs:

- Torches here!
- Spouses
- Funny Chorus for four male voices (1901)

Mixed choirs:

- O salutaris Away (1901)

Orchestral pieces:

- Reminders (polka, 1872)
- Rusalka (polka, 1873)
- Sparks (gallop)
- Off (gallop, 1874)
- Zefyri (gallop, 1875)
- Mignonette (Polka, 1875)
- Josephine (gallop, 1878)
- Sychrovská (gallop, 1879)
- Slavic bouquet (Quadrille, 1879)
- Forest Legend (Quadrille, 1880)
- Waltz (1882)
- Memories of the castle Eisenberg (Quadrille, 1882)
- Tarantella (1882)

== Bibliography ==
- Emingerová, Kateřina (1924). Obrázky ze staré hudební Prahy [Pictures from the old musical Prague] (in Czech). Český čtenář.
