= Simon During =

New Zealand cultural theorist (1950-)

Simon During FAHA (born 1950) is a New Zealand born academic and cultural theorist who has spent most of his career in Australia and the United States. He is known for his contributions to cultural studies, postcolonial studies, secularism studies, and, more recently, the history and theory of the humanities.

== Early life and education ==
During’s father, Peter During (born Cornelius Kauders), was a soil scientist who fled Nazi-controlled Europe and settled in New Zealand in the 1940s. His mother, Dr Zoë During, was a medical officer of health in South Auckland. The neuroscientist Matthew During was his brother. His great-aunt was the Czech artist Gertrud Kauders (1883–1942), who was murdered at a Nazi concentration camp, likely the Sobidor extermination camp.

During studied as an undergraduate at Victoria University of Wellington and the University of Auckland before completing a PhD at the University of Cambridge, where his doctoral research focused on the novelist George Eliot.

== Academic Career ==
During joined the English Department at the University of Melbourne as a tutor in 1983. After visiting positions at the University of Auckland and the Rhetoric Department at UC Berkeley, he was appointed Robert Wallace Professor of English at Melbourne in 1993, serving as head of department in the late 1990s. He was instrumental in establishing Melbourne’s programs in Cultural Studies, Media and Communications, and Publishing. In 2001 During left Melbourne for Johns Hopkins University, where he taught in the English department for nine years. Between 2010 and 2017 he was a Research Professor at the Institute for Advanced Studies in the Humanities at the University of Queensland, and he later returned to the University of Melbourne as a Professorial Fellow. He has also held visiting appointments at the Frei Universität Berlin, Universität Tübingen, the American Academy of Rome, Princeton University, the University of Cambridge, Université de Paris among others. In 2009, he was a seminar leader at Cornell University’s School for Critical Theory. In 2019 he lectured and travelled in Kerala, India, as a recipient of the Kerala Higher Education Council’s Erudite Scholar award. During edited The Cultural Studies Reader (first published in 1993), which became a standard introduction to the discipline internationally and went through expanded editions and translations.

== Scholarship and influence ==
During’s early work helped establish cultural studies and postcolonial studies as academic fields; The Johns Hopkins Guide to Literary Theory and Criticism credits him as the first scholar to use the term “post-colonialism” in its now-current sense, and his 1980s writing examined how European imperialism shaped Western culture. The literary historian Patrick Evans described During’s work on New Zealand literature and culture from that period as among the most significant scholarly observations made on the subject.

His book Patrick White (1996) was a notable and, at the time, controversial intervention in Australian literary studies, reading White’s fiction through postcolonial and queer theory. His Foucault and Literature: Towards a Genealogy of Writing (1992) explored the implications of Michel Foucault’s thought for literary studies, and the literary scholar Wang Ning has said that During’s cultural-studies writing was especially widely cited in China.

During’s Modern Enchantments: The Cultural Power of Secular Magic (2002) examined the persistence of magical thinking and stage illusion within modern secular societies, and is often considered his best-known book. Exit Capitalism: Literary Culture, Theory and Post-Secular Modernity (2009) considered the relationship between literary culture, political economy, and contemporary capitalism, while Against Democracy: Literary Experience in the Era of Emancipations (2012) examined literature’s relationship to political emancipation.

In later career, During’s work shifted toward British literary history and toward broader questions about secularism, conservatism, and the humanities; he has also been associated with the “postcritique” turn in literary studies. The scholar Andrew Dean has argued that this shift in During’s interests across his career is emblematic of his academic generation more broadly. His most recent book, Humanities Theory (2026), co-authored with Amanda Anderson, argues for understanding the humanities as a global, pluralistic field spanning academic and public life.

In a 2026 essay for The New York Review of Books, “Finding Gertrud Kauders,” During wrote about his great-aunt’s life and art and the family’s discovery, decades after her death, of her artistic legacy.

== Honours and Recognition ==
During was elected a Fellow of the Australian Academy of the Humanities in 2000. In 2003 he was awarded a Centenary Medal by the Australian Prime Minister for services to the humanities.

== Selected Works ==
- The Cultural Studies Reader. Routledge. 1993. ISBN 9780415077095.
- Foucault and Literature. Psychology Press. 1993. ISBN 9780415012423.
- Patrick White. Oxford University Press. 1996. ISBN 9780195534979.
- Modern Enchantments: The Cultural Power of Secular Magic. Harvard University Press. 2002. ISBN 9780674006072.
- Cultural Studies: A Critical Introduction. Routledge. 2005. ISBN 9780415246569.
- Exit Capitalism: Literary Culture, Theory and Post-Secular Modernity. Routledge. 2009. ISBN 9780203872642.
- Against Democracy: Literary Experience in the Era of Emancipations. Fordham University Press. 2012. ISBN 9780823242542.
- Humanities Theory. Oxford University Press. 2026. ISBN 9780198918783.
