= Václav Žáček =

Czech professional extreme sport athlete (born 1978)

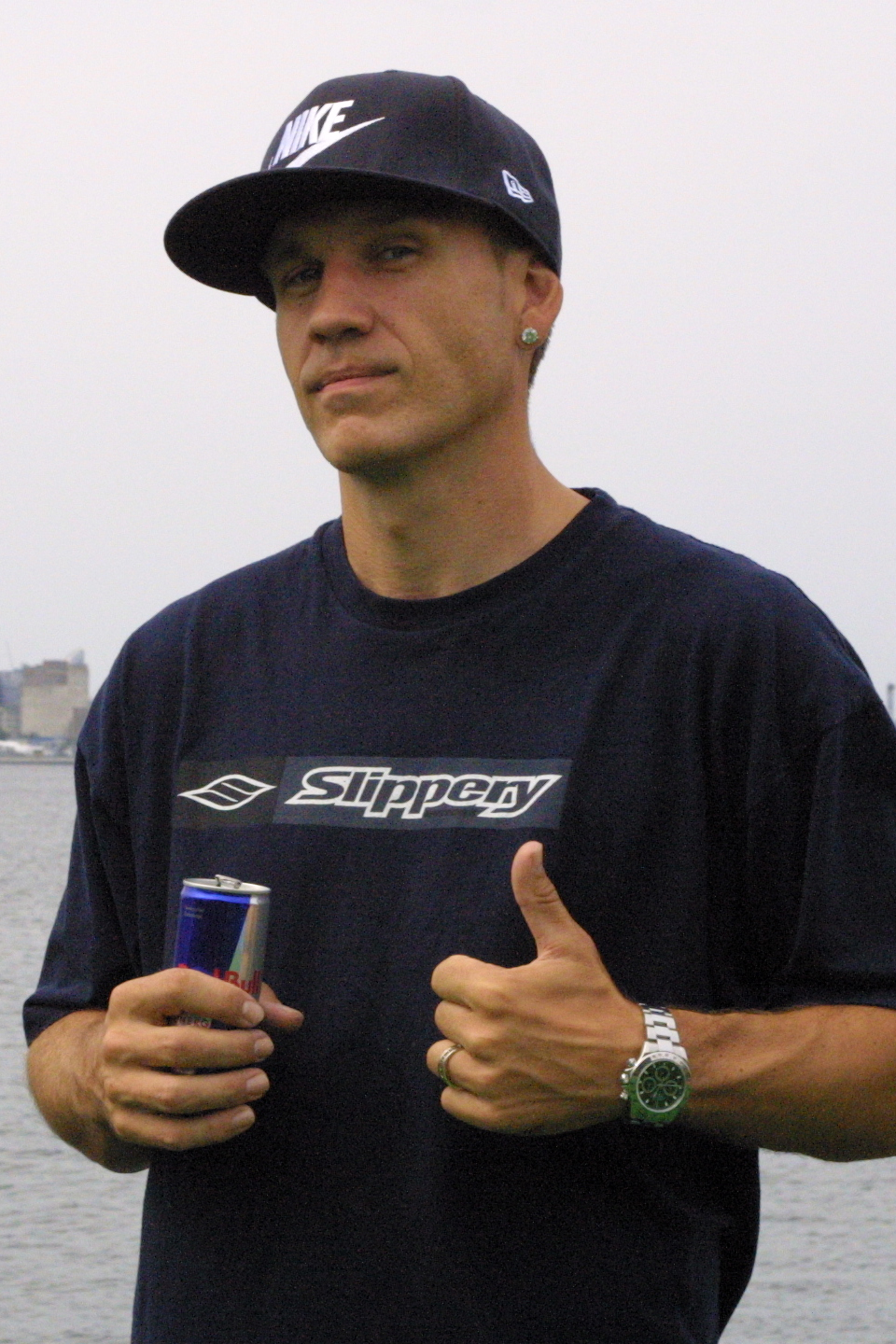
- In summer 2010.

Background information
- Born: January 17, 1978 (age 48); Prague, Czechoslovakia
- Genres: pop, rap,
- Occupations: Extreme sport athlete, record producer, deejay, rapper, singer
- Instruments: turntables, keyboard,
- Years active: 1992–present
- Labels: Monitor EMI, EMG ToCo, DJ World, PolyGram, BMG Ariola, Universal Music, T-boyz Music ,
- Website: www.ICEMAN.info

Václav "Iceman" Žáček (born January 17, 1978, in Prague) is a Czech-American professional extreme sport athlete who performs freestyle on a personal watercraft. He is a founding member of the Freestyle Personal Watercraft Association (FPWCA) and founder and organizer of the US and European Freestyle Championships on personal watercraft.

He is also a former member of the Czech boy band T-Boyz, and was a hip hop DJ, radio host and music producer.

== Music career ==
Žáček was a member of Technoboys from 1992 until 2003. The band was changed its name to T-Boyz in 1997. Žáček wrote lyrics for the group, and later also contributed to composing the music. Their album Nejsi Jediná was certified gold. He is writer of group's biggest hit: Beruška.

From 1995 to 2006 Žáček also worked as a DJ of R&B and hip hop music, in the Czech Republic and other European countries. He had resident nights in Prague clubs such as Radost FX, Mecca and Karlovy lázně. From 1999 to 2001 he appeared as the DJ on TV Nova's Rande. From 2003 to 2006 he hosted the show Soul Night R&B Top 10 for Prague's Radio Deejay.

From 2003 to 2005 he produced music for Czech R&B singer Victoria.

In 2021 he wrote a score and produced soundtrack for the movie Hot Water

== Personal Watercraft Freestyle career ==
=== Competitive career ===
Žáček became interested in personal watercraft freestyle in 2002. In 2003 he travelled to the United Kingdom to train with multiple World Champion, American Eric Malone. In 2004, he trained with 2001 World Champion Alessandre Lenzi of Brazil, also in Great Britain.

In 2005 he competed in the Czech Republic Freestyle Championship, finishing 2nd. He turned professional in 2006, and that summer he became the first Czech rider to perform a back flip on a personal watercraft. The same year Žáček took part in the European Championship Series, finishing 4th overall, the highest ever position for a Czech rider.

In the 2006 season Žáček participated in the Alpe Adria Cup, a joint championship of Austria, Croatia, Slovenia, Serbia and Czech Republic, finishing 2nd. After this Žáček qualified for the World Cup Open in Russia. Competing alongside the world's top riders including his former instructor, Alessandre Lenzi, Žáček finished in 6th position. Later in the season Žáček became the first Czech rider to participate in the IJSBA World Finals at Lake Havasu, Arizona, in the United States. Competing against riders from 28 different countries, Žáček finished in 10th place.

During his career Žáček has been Czech national champion several times, British national champion (2007), won the European Alpe Adria Cup twice, finished in the top five in the European Championship every year from 2006 to 2014. He also finished in 3rd place in the IJSBA World World Finals multiple times (2008, 2010, 2016) and 3rd in Pro Watercross World Championship in 2016 and 2017.

=== Other PWC activities ===
Outside of competitions, Žáček is involved in attempts to popularize his sport in the Czech Republic and other countries, via exhibitions of his freestyle art at various sporting and cultural events. As founder member and secretary of the Czech Jet Ski Association, he has appeared on Czech television to discuss the development of jet ski in the Czech Republic. Žáček has cited as his top career achievement his success in establishing several public tracks on Czech inland waterways, after years of jet ski prohibition. This was achieved by the Czech Jet Ski Association following negotiations with the Ministry of Transport and Shipping SPS.

In 2011 Žáček and others established the Freestyle Personal Watercraft Association (FPWCA), dedicated to the promotion of freestyle on personal watercraft. In 2012 he founded the European Freestyle Championship (EFC), the first championship dedicated exclusively to Freestyle. Freestyle competition had previously been a part of high speed racing events. EFC events have been organized in France, the United Kingdom, Austria and Poland.

In 2016, the EFC series was brought to the United States as the US Freestyle Championship (USFC). USFC organize two annual competitions Spring and Fall round in Lake Havasu City, Arizona right underneath London Bridge.

== Discography ==
=== with Technoboys ===
==== Albums ====
- 1994 – Vol. 1 - Monitor-EMI

==== Singles ====
- 1993 – "Techno Techno Technoboys" - Monitor-EMI
- 1994 – "Rolničky" - Monitor-EMI
- 1994 – "Move It" - EMG ToCo
- 1994 – "Everybody" - EMG ToCo
- 1995 – "My Life" - EMG ToCo
- 1996 – "Party People" - DJ World

=== with T-Boyz ===
==== Albums ====
- 1997 – T-Boyz - PolyGram
- 2000 – Nejsi Jediná - BMG Ariola

==== Singles ====
- 1997 – "Step By Step" - PolyGram
- 1997 – "Just Be My Girl" - PolyGram
- 1999 – Nejsi Jediná - BMG Ariola
- 2000 – "T-Boyz" - BMG Ariola
- 2001 – "Zas Nemám Čas" - BMG Ariola
- 2001 – "Beruška" - BMG Ariola
- 2002 – "Vzpomínka" - BMG Ariola
- 2003 – "Kouzla" - T-boyz Music
- 2004 – "Díky" - T-boyz Music
