= Jan Ludevít Procházka =

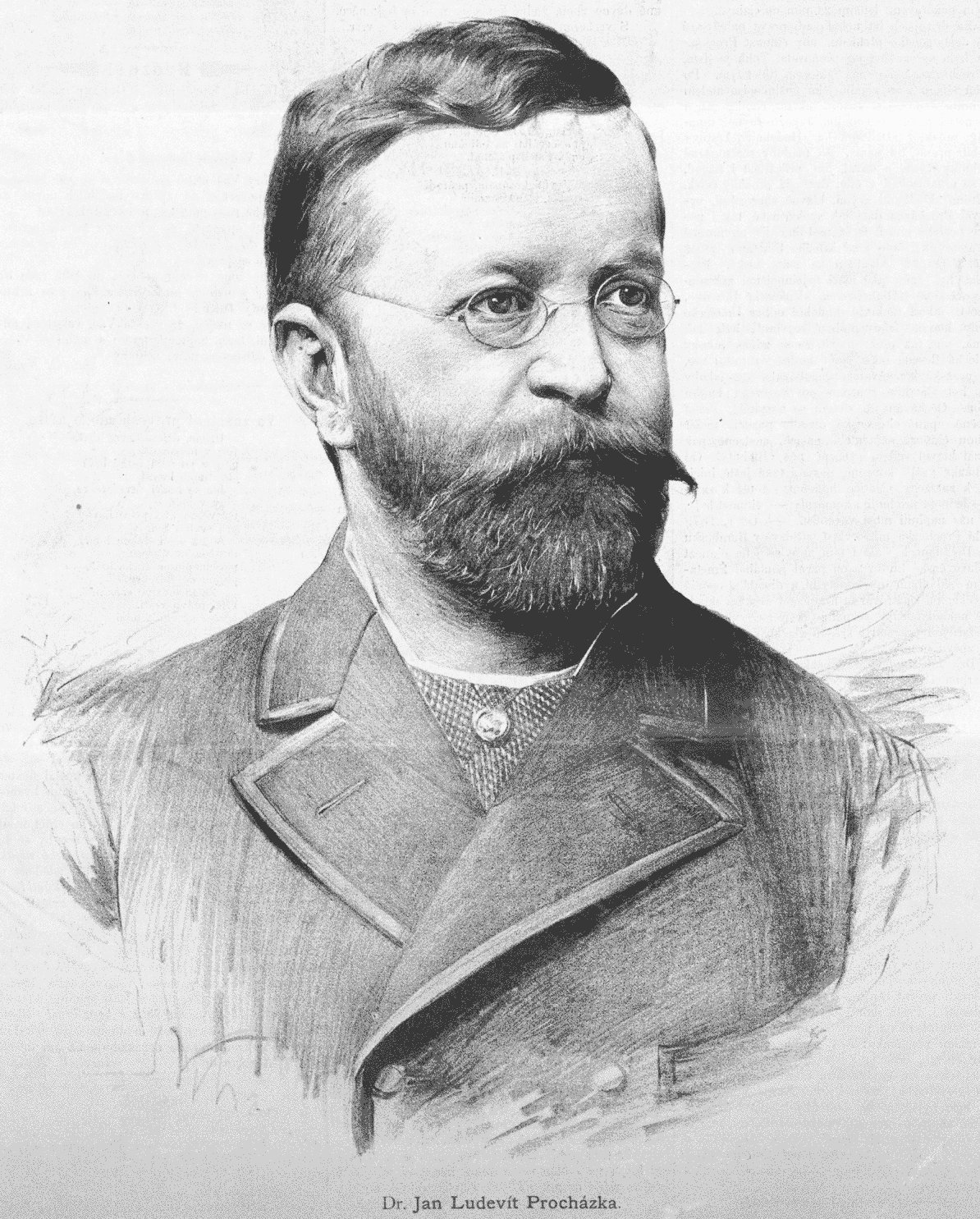
Jan Ludevít Procházka

Jan Ludevít Procházka also known as Ludwig Prochazka (14 August 1837 – 19 July 1888) was a Czech pianist, composer, music teacher and author of books on music.

== Life and activities ==
Procházka was born on 14 August 1837 in Klatovy. He was baptized as Ludovicus Joannes (Ludvík Jan). He received his first musical education from his father Josef Procházka, who was an organist. and the composer Leopold Eugen Měchura. After studying at the grammar school in Klatovy, he began studying law at Charles University in Prague.

In Prague, as a gifted pianist, he became a student of Zdeněk Fibich, Ludvík Grünberger and Bedřich Smetana, with whom he soon became friends. As a composer, he wrote a collection of songs called Záboj, to which Smetana himself contributed.

He is also one of the founders of the Prague choir Hlahol. In his apartment and later in the Konvikt Hall, he often organized concerts where he presented new works by Czech composers. The compositions of Antonín Dvořák, Zdeněk Fibich and other Czech composers were heard there for the first time. Jan L. Procházka was also a reviewer of Národní listy, Dalibor and Hudební listy.

When his wife Marta, née Reisingerová, a concert singer, obtained an engagement in Hamburg in 1878, he moved to Germany with her. There he worked as a sought-after singing teacher for many years. After moving to Hamburg, he became a piano professor at the local conservatory and orchestra conductor. He also promoted the performance of the opera Two Widows at the Hamburg Theatre. In Dresden, where he moved at some stage before 1885, he promoted the publication of Smetana's compositions by the renowned Bote & Bock publishing house.

He also devoted himself to composing; his compositions include, for example, Czech romances and duets.

He died on 19 July 1888 in Prague at the age of 50, and was buried at the Olšany Cemetery in Prague.
