= Pavla Fořtová-Šámalová =

Czech painter and art historian (1886–1974)

- Fořtová-Šámalová around 1927
- Born: Pavla Fořtová; 23 July 1886; Prague, Bohemia, Austria-Hungary
- Died: 3 April 1974 (aged 87); Prague, Czechoslovakia
- Occupations: painter, graphic artist, illustrator, art historian
- Spouses: Prokop Fořt (m. 1908; died 1920); Přemysl Šámal (m. 1937; died 1941)

Pavla Fořtová-Šámalová (née Kropfová; 23 July 1886 – 3 April 1974) was a Czech painter, graphic artist, illustrator and art historian.

== Life ==
Pavla Fořtová was born on 23 July 1886 in Prague, into a culturally prominent family. Her maternal great-grandfather was the Czech businessman and industrialist František Kavalír, founder of the Kavalierglass works in Sázava, and her great-grandmother was the writer Antonie Kavalírová. Their son, Josef Kavalier (1831–1903), had a daughter, Pavla Antonia Karolina (1858–1927), who married Jan Erdmann Kropf; Pavla was born to them in 1886.

Her father, an amateur painter, encouraged her artistic talent from an early age. During visits to Munich, she became acquainted with the collections of the Alte Pinacotheca. She later studied in private studios in Prague, including those of Helena Emingerová (1898–1900), Ema Krostová (1900–1902), and Václav Jansa (1902–1905). In 1905, she exhibited her oil painting Autumn at the 66th exhibition of the Artistic Unity for Bohemia at the Rudolfinum in Prague. During World War I, she became involved in the activities of the Resistance movement Maffia, while her first husband, Prokop Fořt, was drafted into the army.

Her visits to foreign museums sparked a lasting interest in Culture of Egypt. In 1923, she enrolled in Egyptology at Charles University under Professor František Lexa. By 1935, she was working on a comprehensive scholarly and artistic study of ancient Egyptian ornamentation; her book on the subject was later published in English, German, and French. She was also a member of the Oriental Institute (Prague) and, from 1933, served as executive director of the Circle of Fine Artists.

Following a trip to Dalmatia, she turned to watercolor painting, convinced that this medium best captured the character of the Adriatic Sea. She subsequently used watercolor to depict motifs of nature, flowers, landscapes, and urban and rural architecture in Czechoslovakia and abroad.

== Personal life ==
She married for the first time in 1908. Her husband, Prokop Fořt, was the son of Josef Fořt, who served as Austrian Minister of Trade in 1906–1907. Prokop Fořt died in a car accident in 1920 at the age of 37.

Her second husband was the politician Přemysl Šámal, long-time chancellor to President Tomáš Garrigue Masaryk, whom she married on 30 June 1937. In January 1940, Šámal was arrested by the Gestapo, interrogated for four months, and imprisoned at Moabit in Berlin. He was later transferred in critical condition to a private hospital, where he died in March 1941 at the age of 73.

Pavla Fořtová-Šámalová lived until her death in April 1974 in the house U Ježíška on Karmelitská Street in the Malá Strana district of Prague.

== Honours ==
The street Pavly Fořtové in Sázava is named after her.
