= Adolph Aloys von Braun =

Austrian diplomat and statesman

Adolph Freiherr von Braun
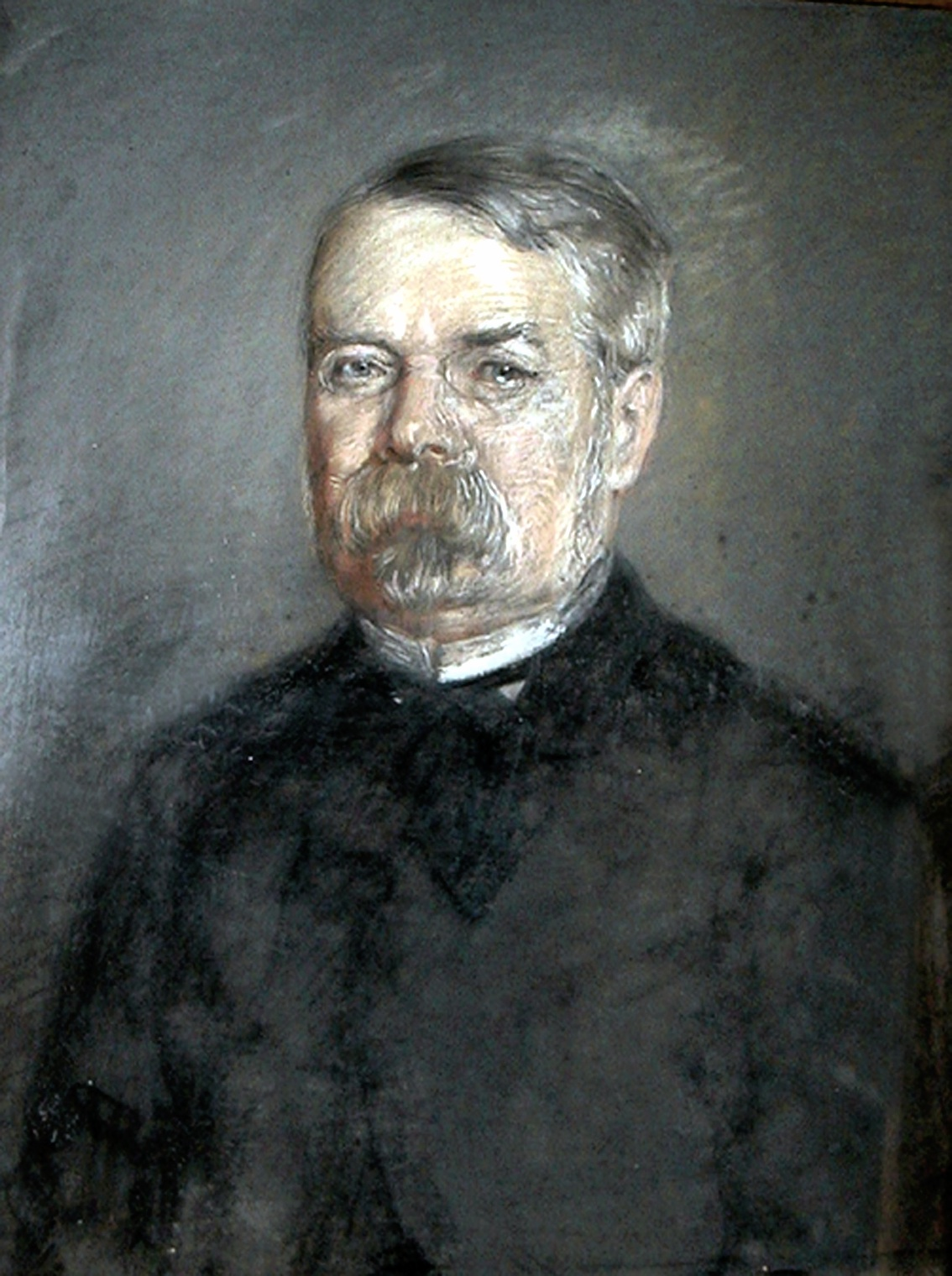
- Born: 17 June 1818; Prague, Kingdom of Bohemia
- Died: 4 March 1904 (aged 85); Markt Aussee, (Bad Aussee), Austria
- Occupation: Director of the Emperor's Cabinet's Chancellery
- Spouse: Louise Friederike Borgnis (18??-1897; her death)

Adolph Aloys Freiherr von Braun (17 June 1818 – 4 March 1904) was a diplomat and statesman who became one of the closest collaborators of the Emperor Franz Joseph I of Austria. He was the Privy Councillor and Director of the Emperor's Cabinet's Chancellery (Hofrat und Chefs der Kabinetskanzlerei) from 1865 to 1899.

== Education ==
Von Braun was born in a suburb of Bubna in Prague, Kingdom of Bohemia (today the Czech Republic). He attended primary and high school in Prague and Pilsen, graduated with highest honours, and received the "Ring of the Emperor". In 1842, he graduated in Law and Political Science at the Universities of Prague and Vienna. From 1843 to 1848, he studied at the University of Rome obtaining degrees in mineralogy, Church Law and Italian.

== Diplomatic career ==
1842 : Began internship at the Ministry of Foreign Affairs in Vienna.

1848 : Franz Joseph I succeeds his uncle Ferdinand I as Emperor of Austria at the age of 18. Count Felix Schwarzenberg, statesman who restored the Habsburg Empire as a European power following the revolution of 1848 appointed Minister President and Foreign Minister.

1849 : Appointed Legation Attaché to Switzerland (Bern and Zurich)).

1849 : In April, Braun appointed Presidential Secretary of the Minister President and Foreign Minister of Austria, Count Felix Schwarzenberg.

1850-1851 : Accompanied the Foreign Minister to conferences in Dresden and other German courts and was entrusted with special missions at this crucial historic moment for the Empire.

1851 : Appointed as Legation Secretary to the Presidential Embassy in Frankfurt am Main as Chargé d'Affaires ad interim of Austria to Frankfurt am Main, Hessen Darmstadt and Hessen-Nassau.

1856 : Promoted to the full tenure of Chargé d'Affairs (Geschäftsträger) at the Embassy in Frankfurt am Main.

1859 : Promoted to the rank of Legation Counsellor. Responsibilities as Chargé d'Affairs were extended to the Princely Courts of Lippe, Schaumburg-Lippe, Waldeck and Hessen-Homburg and to a special mission at the Grand Duchy of Baden.

1861 : Interim Head of the Office of German Affairs in Vienna before moving back to Frankfurt in August of the same year.

== Work with Emperor Franz Joseph I of Austria ==
1863 : Appointed Presidential Secretary of the Emperor during the Congress of the German Princes in Frankfurt am Main.

1865 : Called back to Vienna and appointed by the Emperor to become Privy Councillor and Director of His Cabinet's Chancellery. Took oath on Nov.10, 1865. The very private relation between him and the Monarch commanded his absolute secrecy. At the end of 1865 his career as a diplomat ended and he took permanent residence in Vienna.

1866 : Battle of Königrätz, on 3 July – Defeat of the Austrian Monarchy against the Prussians. Dissolution of the German Confederation.

1867 : Franz Joseph I became Constitutional Emperor

1867 : The Emperor and his wife Elisabeth were invited by Napoleon III to visit the Paris World Exhibition (autumn). Braun was part of the retinue.

1867 : The Emperor's brother Ferdinand Maximilian (Emperor Maximilian I of Mexico) was shot in Mexico.

1869 : Napoleon III invited the Emperor Franz Joseph I to the opening of the Suez Canal (planned by Austrian Engineer Alois Negrelli and built by French Ferdinand de Lesseps). Braun traveled in the retinue of the Emperor who made the first pilgrimage of a Habsburg Monarch to the Holy Land since Friedrich III in 1430. The route went through Constantinople, Jerusalem, Jaffa to Egypt.

1870 : Franz Joseph I revoked the Concordat with the Vatican.

1874 : Traveled with the Emperor to St.Petersburg to visit Tsar Alexander II of Russia.

1879 : Silver Wedding Anniversary of the Emperor.

1889 : Death of Crown Prince Rudolf in Mayerling together with Baroness Mary Vetsera. von Braun wrote on behalf of the Emperor to the mother of 18-year-old Vetsera on 19 July 1889 to announce the tragic event and forward the Emperors condolences. (Letter in the Vienna National Library)

1898 : Assassination of the Empress Elisabeth in Geneva, Switzerland.

1899 : von Braun went into retirement in December, at age 81.

== Titles and decorations ==
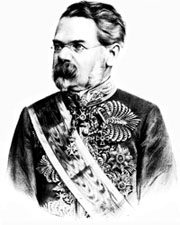
Adolph Aloys von Braun

1850-1851 : Received Knights Cross of the Albert Order (King of Saxony) and the Order of the Royal Württemberg Crown.

1861 : Received the Order of the Iron Crown Third Class for the services rendered that year. Knighted (Ritter) (4.1.1861)

1863: Knight's Cross of the Order of Leopold.

1867 : Grand Cross of the Order of Leopold (Privy Councillor).

1868 : Distinguished with the title of k.k. Wirklichen Geheimen Rates.

1873 : Received knighthood and the Commander Cross of the Hungarian Royal Order of St.Stephan from the Emperor. Receives the title of Baron (Freiherr) (4.7.1873)

1975 : Honorary citizen of Bad Aussee, Austria.

1881 : Braun was appointed Knight of the Order of the Golden Fleece (Kanzler des Goldenen Vlies) until his death.

1884 : "Braungasse" (Braun street) in Bad Aussee

1887 : Order of the Iron Crown first class.

1894 : Honorary Citizen of the city of Plan in Bohemia.

1896 : Grand Cross of the Order of Leopold.

1899 : Grand Cross with Diamonds of the Imperial Austrian Order of Leopold, one of the only four recipients of this honour.

1899 : Honorary Member of the Association of Visual Artists of Vienna.

== Further Interests ==
Braun's fondest interests were the study of natural sciences and particularly astronomy and mineralogy. His fine collection of minerals and meteorites was donated to the Museum of Natural History in Vienna (Naturhistorisches Museum) after his death. He developed personal relationships and correspondence with musicians such as Johannes Brahms, Anton Bruckner, Antonín Dvořák and Bedřich Smetana. The whole family was intensely involved in the musical life. They had a permanent Loge at the Vienna State Opera (Loge 13 Parterre). Braun spoke fluent German, Czech, French, Italian and English and had extensive knowledge of the numerous languages spoken in the Austrian Empire.

== Personal life ==
- Parents: Wenzel Braun (1785–1826) and Constantia Fidelis Slanzowsky (b.1788)
- 1858: married (6.4. 1858) Friederike Louise Borgnis, the daughter of Carl Hieronymus Borgnis and Philippine Elisabeth Emma b. Thurneisen. The marriage took place at the Hauskapelle of the Frankfurt Federal Palace— with the hand-written consent of the Emperor.
- Five sons: Carl Adolph von Braun (b. 1859, Frankfurt am Main), Franz von Braun (b. 1861, Frankfurt am Main), Aloys (Louis) Ernst Hugo Gabriel von Braun (b.30.01.1864, Frankfurt am Main - d. 02.09.1937, Klagenfurt), Ernst von Braun (b. 1866, Vienna), Alexander von Braun (b. 1874, Vienna)
- Resided in Prague and Vienna, Frankfurt am Main, Vienna, Bad Aussee (Austria), Schwanegg Waldgut bei Mitterndorf (Austria). The family lived in Vienna very near the Hofburg at the "Stöckl der Belaria" in a comfortable old house next to the Court Stables.
- Social life for von Braun in Vienna was very restricted by his position with the Emperor, but guests were numerous at summer house in Bad Aussee. Among the guests were Kübeck, Schmerlin, Beck, Paar, Hohenlohe, Trautmannsdorf, Kesselstadt, Papay, Hoyos, Simony, Haymerle, Schratt, Hübner, Gabillon, Montenuovo, Andrian, Warsberg, Dumreicher, Graf Taafe, Ceschi, and others.
- 1897: Death of wife, Louise Friederike Borgnis

== Death ==
Von Braun died on 4 March 1904 in Markt Aussee (Bad Aussee), where he was buried.

== Sources ==
- Andreas Enderlin-Mahr "Adolf von Braun: Habsburgs mächtigster Beamter?"
- (in German) (1894.) "Handbuch des allerhöchsten Hofes und des Hofstaates seiner K." ("Handbook of the Supreme Court and courtiers of His Imperial and Royal Apostolic Majesty.") Wien. Accessed October 2011.
- (in English) Der Bagdasarian, Nicolas (1976.) "The Austro-German rapprochement, 1870-1879: from the Battle of Sedan to the Dual Alliance." Fairleigh Dickinson University Press. Accessed October 2011.
- “Erinnerungen an meinen Grossvater Adolf Freiherr von Braun” by Carl-Maria Freiherr von Braun (Geneva, 1989)
- “Ein Bilderbogen aus meinem Leben” by Carl Maria Freiherr von Braun, in collaboration with Muriel von Braun, Geneva 1997
- Diaries of Aloys Ernst von Braun (1864–1937), son of Adolf Aloys von Braun
- Neues Wiener Abendblatt - Wien, Samstag 5.Marz 1904 -
- Letters in the Vienna National Library :
- “Figures et Souvenirs 1859-1871” by Princess Pauline de Metternich, Austrian Ambassador to France.
- Naturhistorisches Museum – Vienna, Austria.
