= Romana Vaccaro =

Czech-German soprano (1956–2024)

- Born: Romana Kahlerová; 20 February 1956; Prague, Czechoslovakia
- Died: 23 January 2024 (aged 67); Bad Schwalbach, Germany

Romana Vaccaro (née Kahlerová, 20 February 1956 – 23 January 2024) was a Czech-German operatic soprano.

== Life and career ==
Romana Kahlerová was born in Prague on 20 February 1956. After studying at the Prague Conservatory, she achieved first prize twice in the national singing competition on Czechoslovak television under her birth name Romana Kahlerová. In Germany, she received private lessons from Eike Wilm Schulte and George-Emil Crasnaru, followed by attendance at Josef Metternich's master class and a scholarship from the Richard Wagner Association of Bayreuth.

Vaccaro came to Germany as an Aussiedler in 1980. She was engaged at the Hessisches Staatstheater Wiesbaden in the 1982/1983 season as a contralto in the opera choir, where she was subsequently also employed as a mezzo-soprano in small to medium solo roles; these included appearances as Lola in Cavalleria rusticana, as Anna in Maria Stuarda, as Giovanna in Rigoletto, as Agricola in Eine Nacht in Venedig and as the chambermaid in Macbeth. In the 1990/91 season, she took on the role of the maid Glascha in Katja Kabanowa at the Staatstheater Wiesbaden. In Wo die wilden Kerle wohnen (premiere: June 1997) by Oliver Knussen, she sang the role of the mother at the Staatstheater Wiesbaden. From 1985 onwards, she appeared as a soloist in concerts and oratorio in contralto. In the Rhine-Main area she sang in, among others. Georg Friedrich Händel's Messiah and Gioacchino Rossini's Petite messe solennelle.

In 1995, she sang the mezzo-soprano part in the premiere of Oratorio by the Italian composer Andrea Cavallari in Florence.

In 1996, she performed Angelina in La Cenerentola at the Kammeroper Frankfurt. This was followed by Dorabella in Mozart's Così fan tutte, Santuzza at the National Theatre of Constanța in Romania in 1998 and Fenena in Verdi's Nabucco in 1999 at the Opernfestspiele Heidenheim. From 2000 to 2003 she sang several concerts with the Johann Strauss Orchestra Frankfurt, which also goes by the name Frankfurter Sinfoniker. At this time, she switched to dramatic soprano. In August 2003, she sang Tosca in the opera of the same name by Giacomo Puccini for the first time in a production of L'Opera Piccola e. V. from Bad Schwalbach in Taunus, whose artistic director is Vaccaro's husband, Michael Vaccaro. The production was repeated in 2004 at Kloster Eberbach. (PDF; 557-kB) In Frankfurter Neue Presse. 1 June 2004 In 2005, she also appeared in the opera Tosca at "Opera en el convento", an opera festival on La Palma. At the 2005 Gut Immling Chiemgau Opera Festival, Vaccaro sang Santuzza in Cavalleria Rusticana. In July 2008, she sang the title role of Aida in the opera of the same name by Giuseppe Verdi for the first time. Afterwards she appeared as Aida in Siegen. In August 2008, she sang Aida once again at the Freilichtbühne Loreley University of Northern Colorado. She later performed mostly in concerts, outdoor events and touring productions, as well as opera galas appearances.

Vaccaro died on 23 January 2024, at the age of 67.
