= Eva Smolková-Keulemansová =

Czech scientist and Holocaust survivor (1927–2024)

Eva Smolková-Keulemansová (née Weilová; 27 April 1927 – 27 February 2024) was a Czech scientist and Holocaust survivor. After she survived the Auschwitz, Neuengamme and Bergen-Belsen concentration camps, she became a renowned scientist and professor of analytical science at Charles University in Prague.

== Early life ==
Smolková-Keulemansová was born on 27 April 1927 in Prague, Czechoslovakia (now the Czech Republic) to a Jewish family. She had a normal childhood in Czechoslovakia as an only child to her parents Alice and Oskar. She finished primary school and had started grammar school but was taken out of school by her father after anti-Jewish laws started applying to grammar schools. She was employed at various Jewish workshops after leaving school.

== The Holocaust ==
On 6 March 1943, Eva and her parents were transported to the Theresienstadt Ghetto in Terezín, where her father was separated from her and her mother. In Terezín, she worked in agriculture, so she was able to go into the ghetto and managed to make contact with her father. In December 1943, she and her mother were transferred to the Auschwitz concentration camp, where she stayed until June 1944. After six months of horrible conditions at Auschwitz, Eva and her mother were unexpectedly recognized as able to work and were relocated to the Dessauer Ufer camp of the Neuengamme concentration camp in Hamburg, where she experienced better conditions. Her final transport was without her mother to Bergen-Belsen concentration camp in April 1945, which was liberated the same month.

== After Liberation ==
Smolková-Keulemansová suffered from dysentery, jaundice, typhus and tuberculosis after liberation. She could not give an address to anyone she knew in Prague, so the International Red Cross did not allow her to return to her country of origin. To receive medical treatment, she was selected to go to Sweden for a six-month recovery stay with 6,000 other prisoners.

=== Return to Prague ===
In November 1945, Smolková-Keulemansová returned to Prague to continue her studies. She completed grammar school and realized that the biggest struggle in her supplementary exams was chemistry, so she began to study chemistry at Charles University in Prague, leading to her lifelong devotion and love for the subject. She graduated from the Faculty of Natural Sciences at Charles University in 1952.

== "The First Lady of Chromatography" ==
After graduating, Smolková-Keulemansová joined the Faculty of Sciences at Charles University and focused on analytical chemistry. In the early 1950s, she built a team focused on modern analytical separation methods such as gas chromatography, high-performance liquid chromatography and electromigration. At the same time, she attended an analytical conference in Prague, leading to her finding a volumetric chromatographic device. Her team began to prepare its own device with volumetric detection and constructed a more universal glass thermal conductivity detector, allowing them to analyze a larger variety of gases. Later, this novel detector became part of a commercially available instrument. Because of her innovation and dedication to the field, she began to be referred to as "the first lady of chromatography".

== Later life and recognition ==
Smolková-Keulemansová became one of the leading experts in the field of chromatography. She was the first professor of chemistry in the Czech Republic and one of the first in Europe. Not only did she continue her studies in chemistry, but she also focused on polarography, a PhD focused on gas chromatography and a DrSc concentrated on inclusion compounds in chromatography. In the early 1970s, inclusion complex formations in selective analytical separations became a major focus of Smolková-Keulemansová's, her first choice being cyclodextrins, but moving on with urea and thiourea for the separation of isomers. Her research on cyclodextrins started soon after her methods focused on gas chromatography, high-performance liquid chromatography and electromigration. Her research became more widespread and she was asked to add many monographs on cyclodextrins, one of them being for a compendium on supramolecular chemistry edited by Jean-Marie Lehn. She has written and co-written 140 original papers and numerous reviews and has contributed to many books, including her work in Journal of High-Resolution Chromatography, "A Few Milestones on the Journey of Chromatography", and an article in the journal Chromatographia, "Study of retention of isomeric aromatic hydrocarbons on GTCB and cyclodextrins".

Smolková-Keulemansová died on 27 February 2024, at the age of 96.
