= Helena Emingerová =

Czech painter (1858–1943)

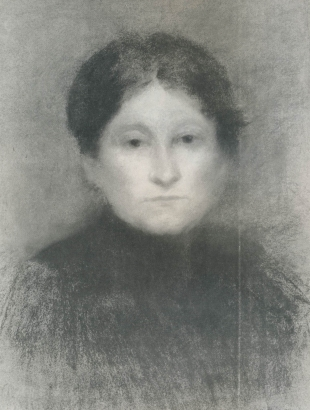
- Self portrait
- Born: 17 August 1858; Prague, Bohemia, Austrian Empire
- Died: 4 August 1943 (aged 55); Prague, Protectorate of Bohemia and Moravia
- Known for: Painting

Helena Emingerová (17 August 1858 – 4 August 1943) was a Czech painter.

== Biography ==
Emingerová was born on 17 August 1858 in Prague, Bohemia, Austrian Empire (now the Czech Republic). One of her siblings, Kateřina Emingerová, was noted musician and writer. Helena studied in Prague at Emil Reynièr's School of Drawing in 1892. She went on to study in Dresden, Germany and then at the Academy of Fine Arts, Munich where her teachers included Maximilian Dasio. In 1891 she went to Paris to study at the Académie Colarossi.

Emingerová first earned a living as a drawing teacher. She went on to support herself by creating portraits (mainly in pastel) of members of the upper class in Austria-Hungary, Bohemia, Germany, Moravia, Poland, and Russia. Emingerová also produced many etchings, as well as some sculptures. Emingerová died on 4 August 1943 in Prague. She is buried at the Olšany Cemetery in Prague.

== Gallery ==
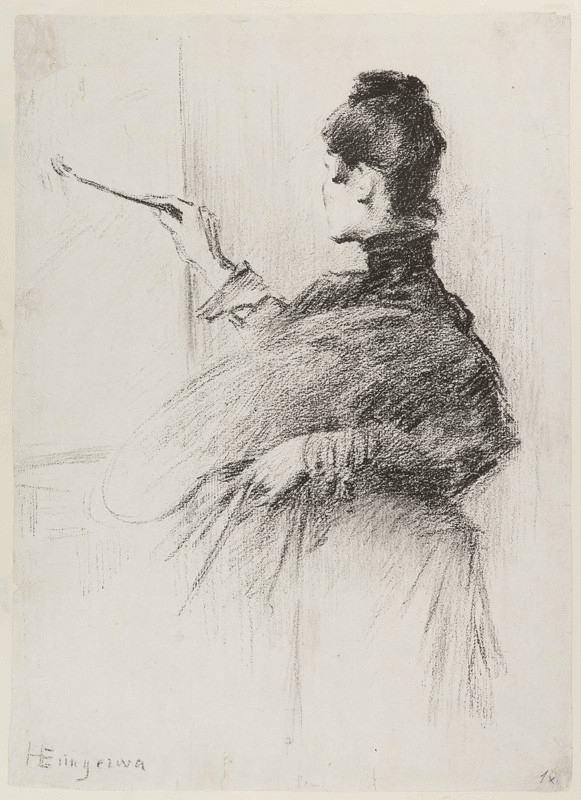
Portrait of painter Olga Boznańska

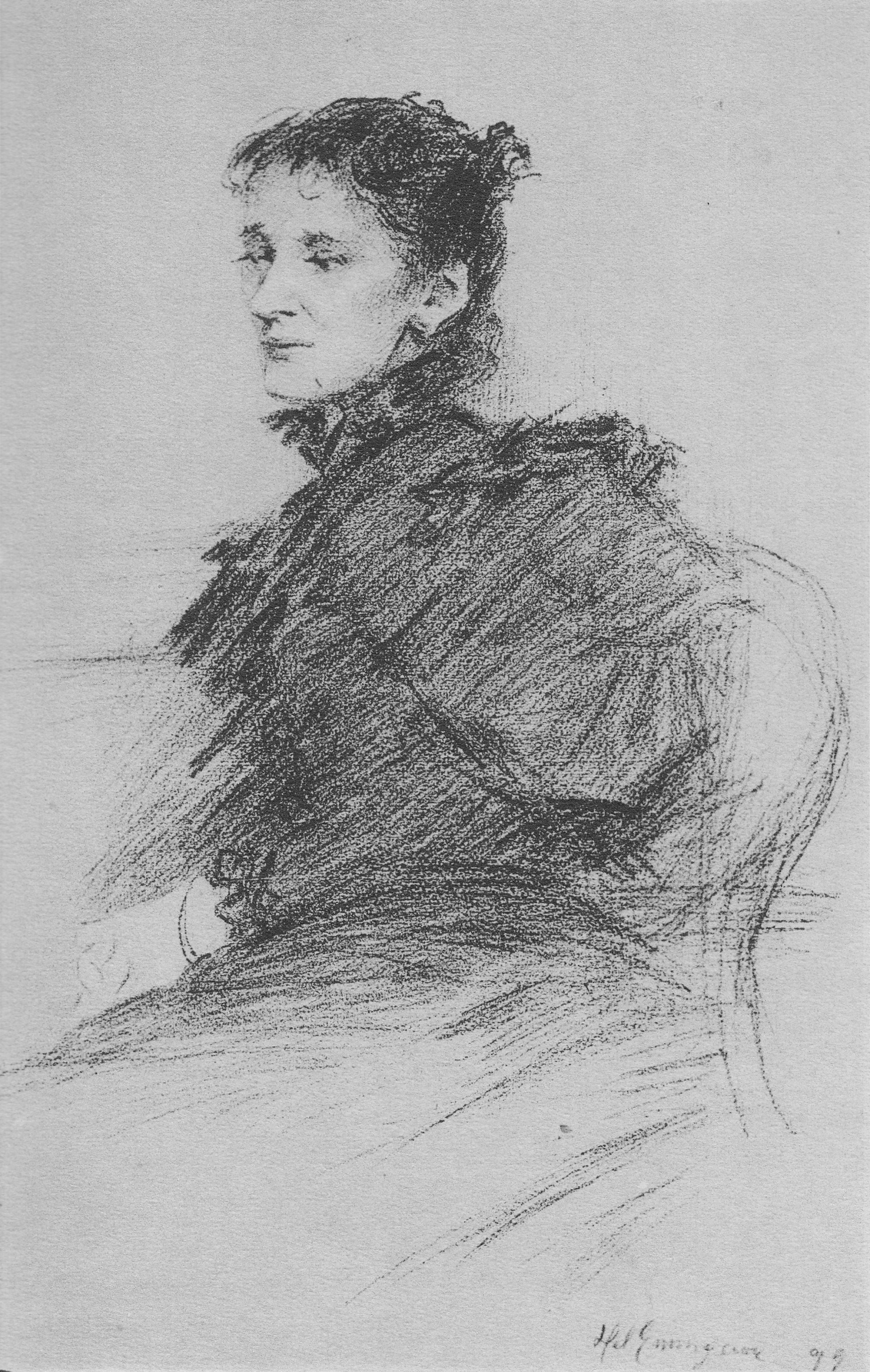
Portrait of Marie Kalasová
