= Gershom ben Solomon Kohen =

Gershom ben Solomon Kohen (died c. 1544 (Note: He has been said to have died in 1544, by March 1545, or in or after 1546.)) (also known as Gershon ben Solomon Cohen and Gershom Kohen Katz (Note: Katz is an abbreviation that means that they are from the Kohen Tzedek, the Kohen priestly class.)) was among the first printers of Hebrew books in Prague. He was the founder of the Gersonides, a dynasty of Ashkenazi Jewish printers. Mid-career, he attained rights to be an exclusive printer of Hebrew books in Bohemia authorized to produce Hebrew books.

== Personal life ==
Based upon his name, he was the son of Solomon Kohen. Kohen lived in Prague by 1509, when he was a tax collector. His relatives lived in České Budějovice (about 150 miles from Prague) and Kraków (about 530 miles east of Prague). (Note: In 1505 and 1506, two of his relatives, Mordecai-Markwart and Bezalel-Tzolel, were burned at the stake.)

He married Května (Tzemah), the daughter of Eva. He owned a house in 1517, his wife purchased another house for her and their children in 1521, and he expanded the original house in 1522. Kohen and Eva had five sons: Solomon, Mordecai, Moses, Judah, and Benjamin.

Ferdinand, King of Bohemia banished Jews from Bohemia in September 1541, requiring them to leave by 11 November 1541. Kohen was one of the rare individuals to receive a geleitbrief, a letter of safe conduct, to give them more time to arrange their affairs to leave Bohemia. He was still in Prague in 1542 and in January 1544. He is said to have died by 1 March 1545, when he was thought to be at least 60 years of age, but he is also said to have worked as a printer in Heddernheim in 1546.

== Printer ==
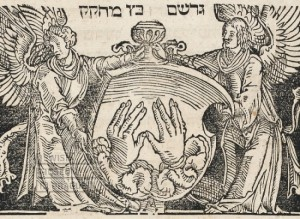
Gershom ben Solomon Kohen printer mark, based upon the priestly meaning of his surname. The image was printed on the fly leafs of the books he published, such as the Pentateuch, Weekly Portions from the Prophets, Five Festive Scrolls that was published in 1530 with his sons.

Kohen published religious books in Hebrew, such as Pentateuchs (Torahs), Talmudic works, and prayer books for people in Prague and across East-Central Europe, such as Poland and Germany.

After 1512 or in 1514, Kohen joined a consortium in Prague with the objective of printing Hebrew books and became its leading member. They ran the first printing press for Hebrew books in Eastern and Central Europe. (Note: Christian printers began publishing books in Prague in 1487.) The group included two financial backers and four craftsmen. (Note: They published a daily prayer book on 2 December 1512, the day before Chanukkah. Only one copy remains, which is among the collection of the Bodleian Library (Oxford University, England).)

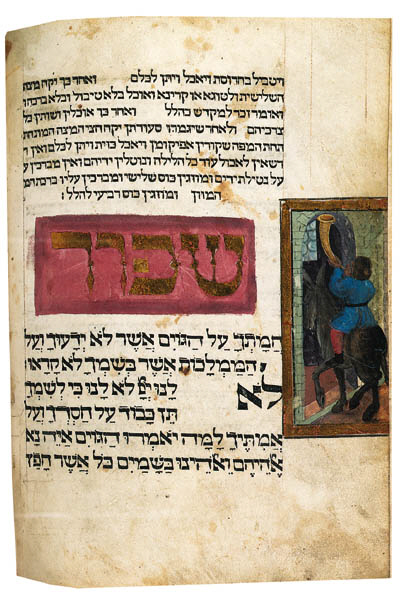
Illuminated siddur, daily prayer-book according to the Ashkenazic rite, Gershom ben Solomon Kohen, (Note: The book identifies the following printers: Gershom ben Solomon Hakohen, Meir ben David of Prague, Meir ben David Halevi Epstein and Hayyim ben David Shachor) 1515, Prague. The book was printed on vellum paper, with a semi-cursive Ashkenazic hand, with square headings. It was illustrated with images in tempera and water colors and illuminated in gold and silver, in the style of Central European Renaissance manuscript illumination. It was the third book produced by the consortium, which was the first printer of Hebrew books north of the Alps.

Kohen used ornaments in his printed works, such as birds, lions, angels, and municipal coat of arms. He produced works with a new cursive rabbinic type and used German square. To do so, in 1514 Kohen invested in equipment to add illustrations and type for new fonts. Woodblocks were commissioned to print incipits, borders, illustrations, and emblems of local towns. New types were cast in several sizes. (Note: The consortium printers from Prague used type unique from Iberian Jews and Italian printers, in that they generally printed books in the style of Ashkenazic type. This typeface design began in Central Europe and may have been the work of Meir ben David of Prague.) The printed three works before they disbanded, a Siddur in 1515, another in 1519, and a Mahzor in 1522. Books published by the consortium had Kohen's printer's mark of outstretched hands, the symbol of a Priestly Blessing for the Kohen family, a priestly class of which Kohen was a member. In addition, of the printers identified on works that they published between 1514 and 1522, Kohen's name was always listed first. The group produced works that surpassed those produced by printers of Christian books in Prague.

His print shop produced what the Library of Congress called a "magnificent Bible" by 1518. Ḥayyim ben David Schwartz joined him in 1518.

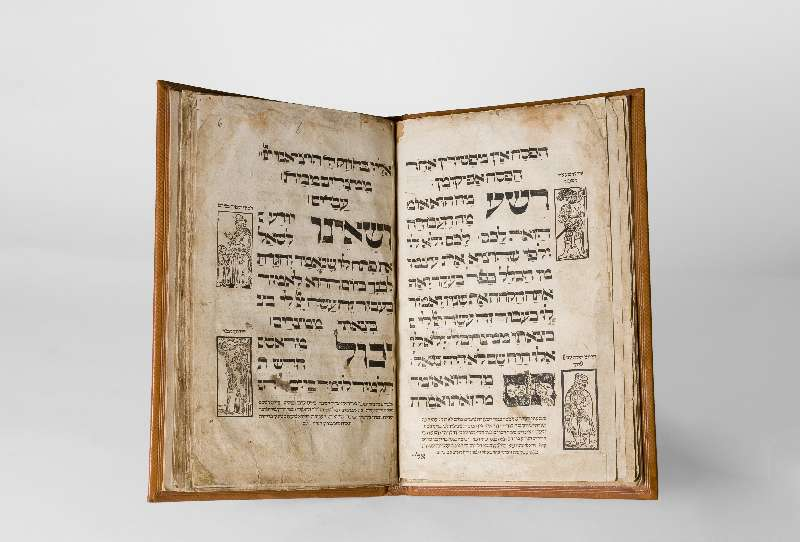
Prague Haggadah, printed by brothers Gershom Kohen Katz and Gronem Katz, 1526, Israel Museum, Jerusalem. The black and white printed books were cheaper to publish and made books available to more lay people.

In 1522, the Prague consortium was disbanded. Kohen and his brother Gronem founded their own printing press. In 1526, the brothers published the Haggadah and Yotzerot. They obtained exclusive rights to print Hebrew books in Bohemia in 1527 from Ferdinand I, King of Bohemia. (Note: The Kohens filed for exclusive rights from Ferdinand I on 10 April 1527. Kohen and his family members continued to maintain these rights through the end of the 16th century.)

Two of Kohen's sons, Solomon and Mordecai, published editions of the Selihot in 1529 and 1530. Kohen's eldest sons print the Mahzor Helek ha-Sheni in 1529, with large square type and with black and white woodblock illustrations, because the illuminated manuscripts were expensive to produce and too costly for their buyers, which had become a trend by 1529, enabling more lay people to own books. The woodcut blocks were commissioned and made by Master IP, a Christian woodcutter.

In the 1530s, the Kohens printed several prayer books and a new edition of the Humash. Two more sons entered the printing profession. Moses was a printer by 1534 and his brother Judah was a printer by 1541.

Kohen began printing in other locations, starting in 1530 when he collaborated on the printing of a Pentateuch in Oles in Silesia. In 1533 and 1534, he was in Augsburg where he published Megillot, Rashi on the Pentateuch, and a Haggadah. He published a German prayer-book and a letter-writer. He printed an edition of the Turim in 1540. Kohen published a pocket-sized Siddur, with his sons Moses and Judah on 1 May 1541. He printed Judeo-German versions of Kings in 1543 and Samuel the following year. Kohen published a few works in Heddernheim in 1546.

== Gersonides ==
Kohen was the founder of a long line of printers into the late 1700s, the Gersonides or Gersonites. His descendants, such as his son Mordecai, continued to follow the Prague tradition for printing, with rare and occasional touches influenced by Italy. (Note: A couple of decades after the invention of the printing press by Johannes Guttenberg around 1440, books were published by Jews in Rome, throughout Italy and into the Iberian peninsula.) They produced ethical and liturgical books in Judeo-German and Hebrew. After 1605, they had competitive pressure from the Bak family of printers who made improvements based upon those used by Italian printers.

The printers initially called themselves the Gershon family ("mishpahat ha-Gershuni"), sometimes clarifying that they descended from Gershom ben Solomon Kohen. They had several surnames, starting with Kohen and Katz. Later on, some family members took the surname Poppers. The Proops family of Amsterdam produced books with a priestly blessing device, as did their Kohen ancestor had beginning in 1514.

== See also ==
- Early editions of the Hebrew Bible
- Hebrew incunabula
- Old master print
