= Florentina Mallá =

Czech composer and pianist

- Born: 14 July 1891; Čakovice, Bohemia, Austria-Hungary
- Died: 7 June 1973 (aged 81); Prague, Czechoslovakia
- Education: Prague Conservatory
- Occupations: Composer, pianist

Florentina Mallá (14 July 1891 – 7 June 1973) was a Czech composer and pianist. She studied piano with Josef Jiránek at the Prague Conservatory. After graduating in 1913, she studied composition privately with Vítězslav Novák. She stopped composing during the communist years. Her works include didactic piano compositions, a sonatina and preludium for piano and about fifty songs. She died in Prague.
