= Karlovy lázně =

Nightclub in Prague, Czech Republic

- Karlovy lázně

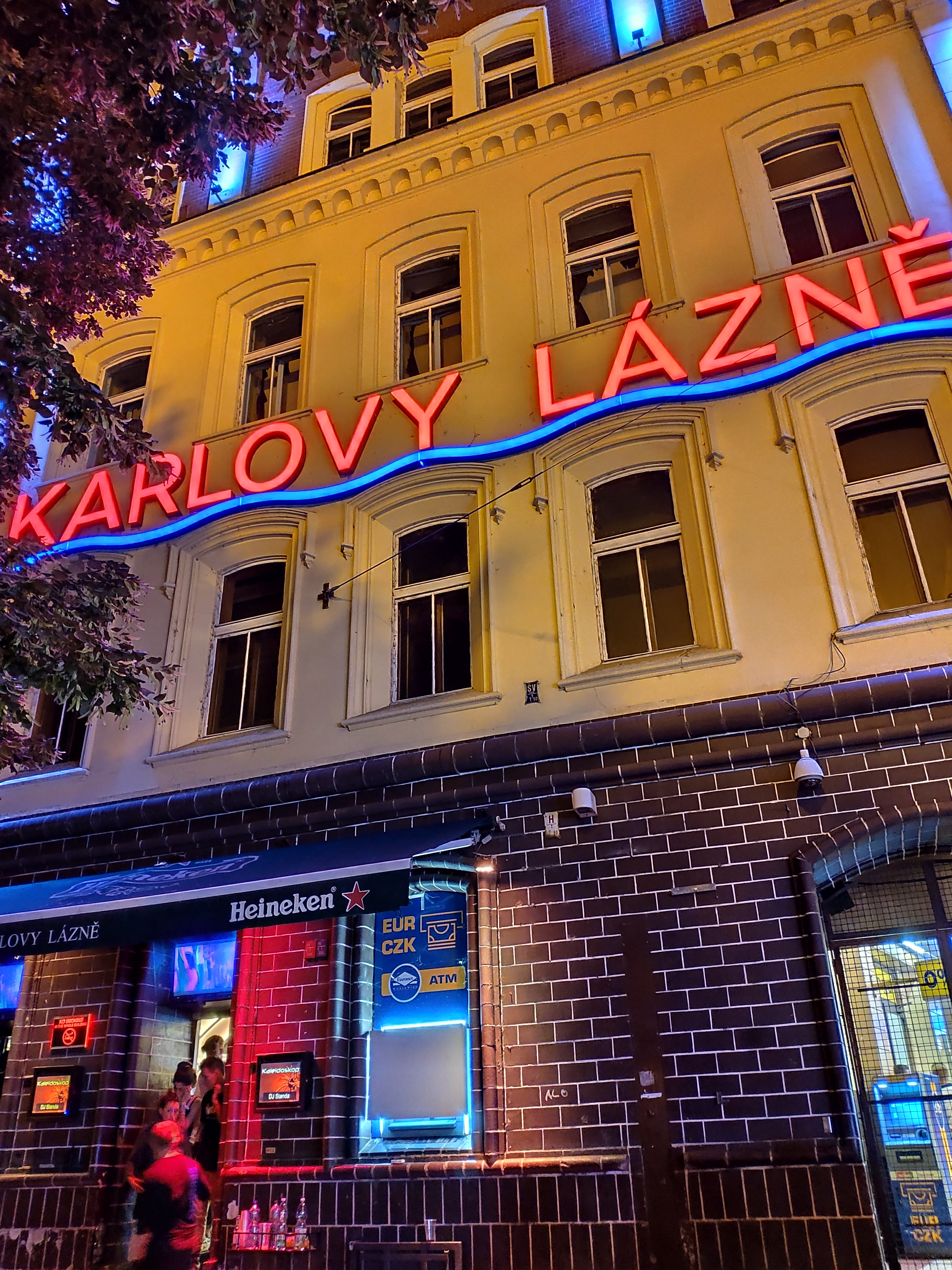
- Karlovy lázně nightclub by night
- Interactive map of Karlovy lázně
- Address: Novotného lávka 198/13; Prague 1 Czech Republic
- Coordinates: 50°5′7.69″N 14°24′49.59″E

Construction
- Opened: 1999

Website
- Official website

Karlovy lázně (Czech pronunciation: [ˈkarlovɪ ˈlaːzɲɛ]; meaning "Charles' Spa") is a nightclub in Prague, Czech Republic, situated 50 meters from the eastern end of the Charles Bridge on the bank of the Vltava River. The club has five floors, with each floor playing a different style of music, a fact which features heavily in the club's marketing.

== See also ==
- List of electronic dance music venues
