= Master of the Chudenice Altarpiece =

Master of the Chudenice Altarpiece (also known as Master of the Epitaph of Půta Švihovský; ?–1514) was a Czech painter active in Prague at the turn of the late Gothic and early Renaissance.

== Life ==
The painter, referred to as the Master of the Chudenice Altarpiece after his largest surviving work, trained in Upper Bavaria and ran a painting workshop in Prague before 1500. According to Karel Chytil, he may be identical to Simon Láb, who was a member of the Prague New Town painters' brotherhood of St. Luke from 1503 and later moved to Lesser Town of Prague and became the caretaker of the house of Vilém Czernin of Chudenice. In 1512, he made his will orally in his presence. He died in 1514 in Prague and the artist's widow took over the painting workshop and was admitted to the painters' guild. The altar was commissioned by the Czernins of Chudenice, who owned the village of Chudenice since the first half of the 13th century. Vilém Czernin was a high dignitary at the court of King Vladislaus II and a member of the legislative commission of the municipal court. It is likely that Simon Láb was their house painter. The identity of the artist is indirectly proved by his other commission for the supreme provincial judge Půta Švihovský of Rýzmberk, who, like the Czernins, came from a branched family Drslavic and his house in Prague was adjacent to theirs.

== Work ==
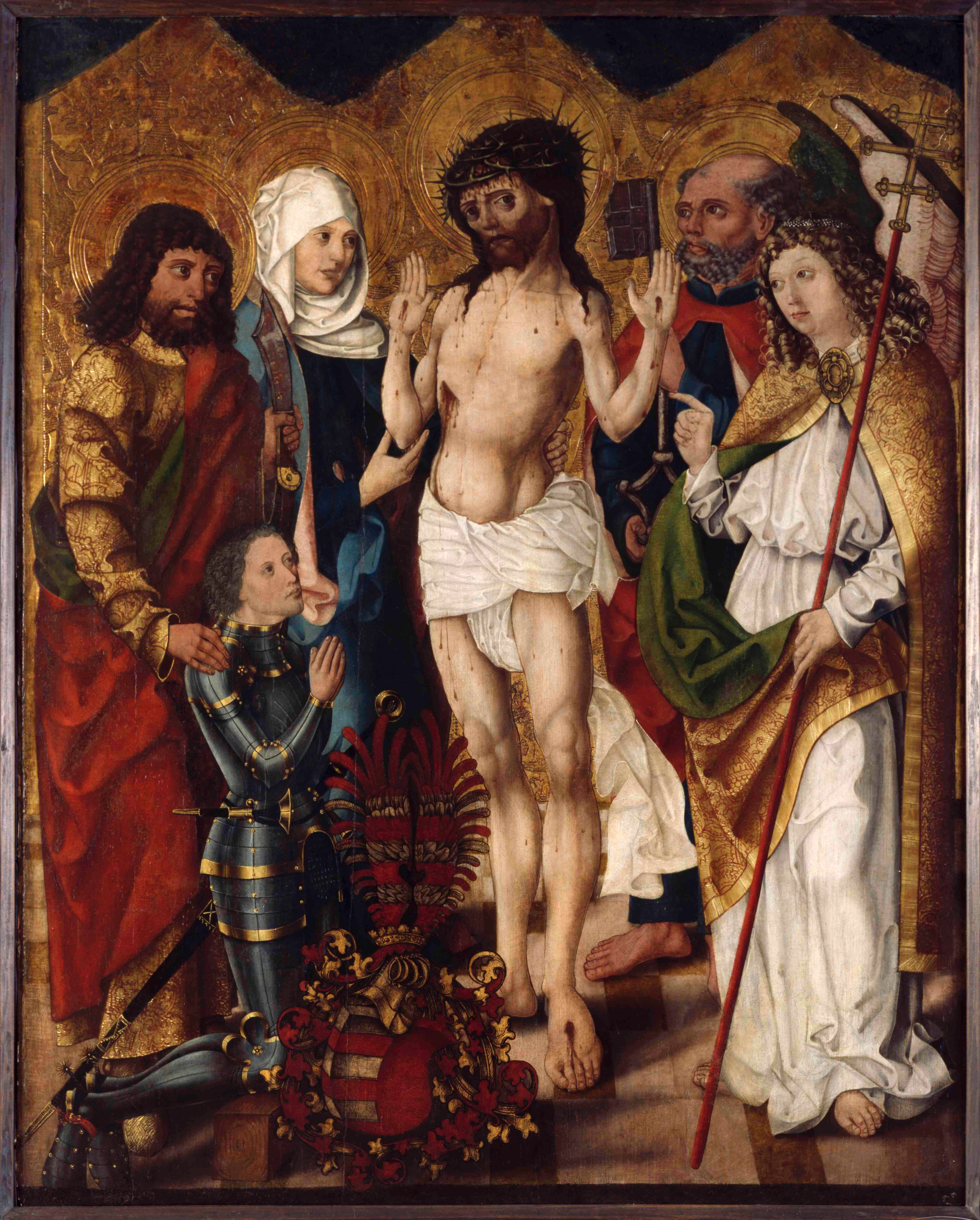
Master of the Chudenice Altarpiece, Epitaph of Půta Švihovský

The Master of the Chudenice Altarpiece was inspired by the graphic works of Martin Schongauer and stylistically by the older generation of Bavarian painters of the first half of the 15th century (Master of Worcester Panel, Master of the Munich Crucifixion (Alte Pinakothek, Munich), Meister der Pollinger Tafeln, Meister des Tegernseer Hochaltars). These may be prototypes for the figures, whose expressively harsh features the painter softens and refines, thus overcoming the late Gothic canon. His figures are characterized by a more natural body composition, relaxed posture and mellowed movement. The painter captures the physical bulk and cast shadows, and through realistic details he moves towards a Renaissance conception of the painting that is more based on sensual reality. On the other hand, the setting of the figures in an abstract pictorial space with the absence of landscape links the work to the 1560s (Master of the Tucher Altarpiece, Master of Bodensee).

=== Altar retable from Chudenice ===
The large four-part retable with a central panel 191 x 167 cm, two movable wings 191 x 60 cm and a predella 56 x 169 cm is painted in tempera and oil on wood. The altar, located in the Gothic church of St. John the Baptist in Chudenice, is a rare example of panel painting in Bohemia at the threshold of late Gothic and Renaissance. The altarpiece was restored in 1891, 1931 and 2012–2013. The central panel depicts the Madonna between saints John the Evangelist and John the Baptist. On the open wings is St. Wenceslaus on the left and St. Christopher on the right. On the back of the wings is St. James the Great with the kneeling donor on the left, St. Andrew on the right. The figures are placed in an imaginary space, which is bordered at the back by a partition decorated with presbrocade (the centre and back of the wings) or decorated with gilding and embossed decoration. On the predella is the scene of the Annunciation of the Virgin Mary and in the centre the emblem of the Czernins. At the bottom are the inscriptions: Domin(us) Wilhelmus domin(us) Joh(an)nes Cernin-Chudenic...fieri fecerunt Anno Domini 1505. The date coincides with the year of Jan Cernin of Chudenice's death and it is therefore likely that the altar was made by his brother Wilém in Jan's memory.

=== Epitaph of Půta Švihovský ===
The 1505 epitaph comes from the mausoleum of Půta Švihovský in the Franciscan monastery in Horažďovice, from where it was later moved to the local parish church. The deanery in Horažďovice donated the painting to the National Museum in Prague and in 1920 it was loaned to the Picture Gallery of the Society of Patriotic Friends of Art. The epitaph of Půta Švihovský was one of the exhibits of the exhibition Gotika v jihozápadních Čechách: Obrazy krásy a spásy (2014). Painting on pine wood panel 137,5 x 110,5 cm. In the centre of the composition is the figure of the Sorrowful Christ, held at the waist by the Virgin Mary, touching his right hand. To the left of her stands St. Bartholomew, who recommends to Christ a kneeling donor in armour, marked with a large coat of arms as a member of the Švihovský family. On the right stands Archangel Michael, to whom the monastery church was dedicated, with St. Peter behind him holding a large key. The background of the painting is gilded and decorated with embossed ornamentation. In contrast to the altarpiece, the figures fill the entire space and communicate with each other with gestures and glances. The painting is colour-balanced, the draperies have a more organic relationship to the body and the cast shadows are more natural. The painter's exquisite attention to detail excels, especially in the ornate cloaks and armour of the donor. Jan Royt believes that the artist a different painter from the workshop that created the Chudenice altar.

=== Votive panel with the Crucifixion from Vrchotovy Janovice ===
The 72 x 52 cm panel depicts Christ crucified with Mary, St. John the Evangelist, St. Jerome and the donor. The origin of the painting is unknown.
