= Emil Engelmüller =

Czech entrepreneur

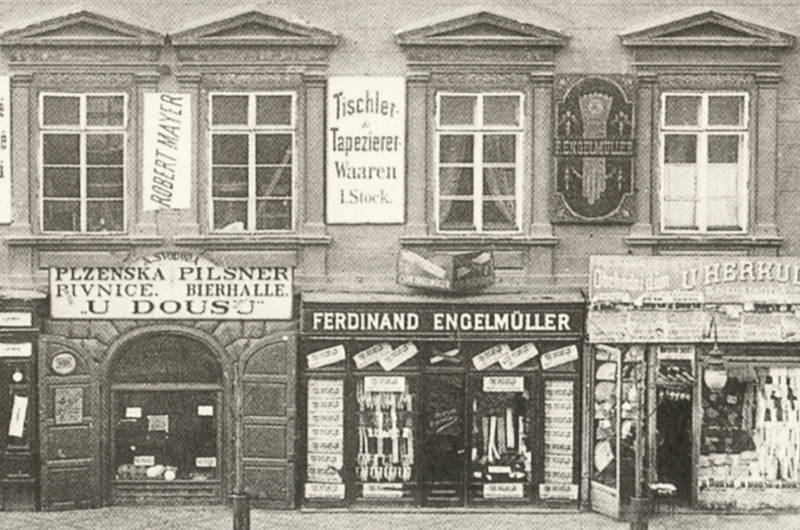
Engelmüller Prague store in 1909

Emil Engelmüller (4 October 1873 – 11 April 1944) was a Czech entrepreneur, founder of the Engelmüller leather gloves company and motoring enthusiast.

== Biography ==
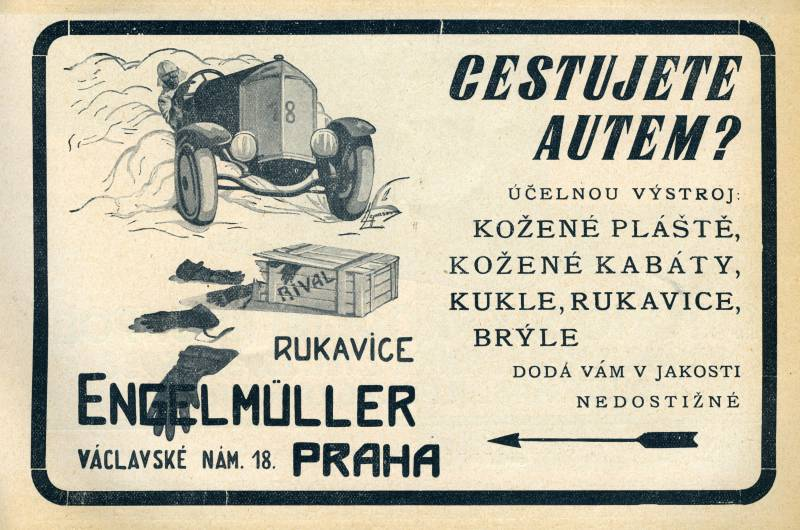
Engelmuller driving gloves – vintage poster

Emil Engelmüller was born on 4 October 1873 in Prague, Bohemia, Austria-Hungary. He inherited the Engelmüller glove shop in 1895 from his father Ferdinand Engelmüller. Ferdinand founded his first glove shop in Prague in 1865, but due to high quality of his products he was soon able to expand across the Austro-Hungarian Empire, and he opened new shops in Vienna and Budapest.

After ten years of Emil Engelmüller's management, in February 1904, Engelmüller presented new driving products at the first automobile exhibition in Bohemia, where the Czech automobile club was founded. Besides new gloves, the range featured elegant leather coats, drivers' peaked caps and leather helmets. Since then, Engelmüller was forever connected with driving gloves and motoring accessories. "Mr Emil Engelmüller is our leading designer in his field." wrote the magazine Sport & Games in 1908.

The outbreak of World War I led to a decline in exports and the loss of some traditional European markets, but this was quickly counterbalanced by supplies to the Austro-Hungarian and German armies. In 1915, Emil Engelmüller's son Richard enrolled in the air force, and after the war brought back inspiration from the "lozenge" camouflage used on his aircraft. This design pattern would later become a hallmark of the brand.

The First Republic of Czechoslovakia brought the Engelmüller brand its heyday. Its shops offered leather suits, caps, gloves and trousers made of the best Russian and Swedish leather. Its advertisements appeared in the majority of motoring and society magazines, such as Automobil, Motor Revue or Touch of society. Engelmüller gloves were worn by car racing driver Eliška Junková, by Czech aerobatics legend František Novák, actress Lída Baarová and many others. Engelmüller glove styles were also popular with international automobile racing stars such as Tazio Nuvolari, Louis Chiron and Bernd Rosemeyer.

Before World War II, the Engelmüller company was manufacturing gloves for pilots of Czechoslovak Air Force and many Czech pilots still wore them during Battle Of Britain while fighting for Royal Air Force. After German occupation in 1939, the company's entire output was commandeered by the Wehrmacht.

The worst moment for Engelmüller was still yet to come. Emil Engelmüller died in Prague on 11 April 1944, one year before the end of the war, and in 1948, the company was nationalised by the new Communist regime.

Engelmuller was revived as gloves and luxury motoring-related goods manufacturer in 2015, and on the occasion of the 150th anniversary of its founding, the brand has launched a new collection that pays homage to its past, ensuring that its tradition lives on.
