= Lubor Těhník =

Czech ceramist (1926–1987)

- Born: 12 December 1926; Prague, Czechoslovakia
- Died: 3 March 1987 (aged 60); Prague, Czechoslovakia
- Known for: Ceramics

Lubor Těhník (12 December 1926 – 3 March 1987) was a Czech ceramist. He used technical earthenware and made a lot of monumental artworks.

== Life ==
He studied Art on Pedagogical Faculty of Charles University in Prague since 1947 till 1951.

== Art ==
He worked in ceramical workshops in Kostelec nad Černými lesy, Štěchovice and Prague.
