= Leopold Eugen Měchura =

Czech composer (1804–1870)

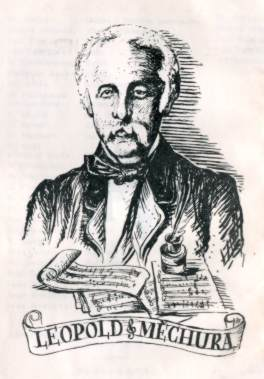
- Měchura on his own drawing
- Born: 2 February 1804; Prague, Bohemia, Holy Roman Empire
- Died: 11 February 1870 (aged 66); Votín, Bohemia, Austria-Hungary
- Education: Charles University
- Occupation: Composer

Leopold Eugen Měchura (also Miechura; 2 February 1804 – 11 February 1870) was a Czech composer.

== Life and work ==
Měchura was born in Prague on 2 February 1804, into the family of a lawyer. He studied law at the Charles University in Prague, as well as piano and music theory. He then moved to the village of Votín (today Otín, part of Klatovy), where he lived from 1828 to 1840, and worked as town justice in Klatovy. From 1840 to 1852, he lived in Klatovy.

His compositional beginnings date back to 1820. He was inspired by Neoclassicism (Wolfgang Amadeus Mozart) and early Romanticism (Carl Maria von Weber, Felix Mendelssohn, Robert Schumann). He was not ambitious and aloof from public interest. He wrote many church compositions and songs. While living in Klatovy, he participated in amateur productions of operas, wrote music for theatre plays, arranged music for the local orchestra, conducted, and played musical instruments (organ, harmonium and French horn).

His operas took either Czech or German texts. Měchura's best-known work was the opera Marie Potocká, after a poem by Alexander Pushkin, which was premiered posthumously in 1871 at the National Theatre in Prague under the baton of Bedřich Smetana.

From 1852 until his death, Měchura lived in Votín and worked as jurist and later assessor, but he still participated in cultural events in Klatovy and the surrounding area. He died in Votín on 11 February 1870, at the age of 64.
