= Šárka (Fibich) =

- Opera by Zdeněk Fibich
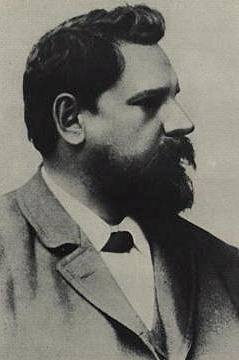
- The composer before 1900
- Librettist: Anežka Schulzová
- Language: Czech
- Based on: Bohemian legend of Šárka
- Premiere: 28 December 1897; National Theatre, Prague

Šárka, opus 51, is an opera in three acts by Zdeněk Fibich to a Czech libretto by Anežka Schulzová, his student and lover. Fibich composed the full score over the period of 8 September 1896 to 10 March 1897. At the time, Czech audiences regarded Fibich with suspicion as being overly influenced by the music of Richard Wagner, and Fibich had selected the legend of Šárka for this operatic subject to try to counter such sentiments. Even so, the opera still contains use of Wagner's idea of leitmotif.

The subject matter, the Bohemian legend of Šárka, which appears in 14th-century Czech literature, is related to that of Smetana's tone poem Má vlast and the opera of the same name by Janáček. Schulzová used as her primary literary source an 1880 version of the story by J. Vrchlický.

== Performance history ==
The opera received its first performance at the Prague National Theatre on 28 December 1897. Šárka is Fibich's most popular opera and is regularly revived in the Czech Republic.

There are two archive radio recordings (1950, 1970) and three commercial recordings:

- Marie Podvalová (Šárka), Lubomír Havlák (tenor Ctirad), cs:Václav Bednář (Prince Premysl), Marta Krásová (Vlasta), Milada Šubrtová (Libyna), Miloslava Fidlerová (Svatava), Jaroslava Vymazalová (Mlada), Ludmila Hanzalíková (Radka), Marie Zalabáková (Hosta), Jaroslava Dobrá (Castava) & Jaroslav Veverka (Vitoraz). Prague National Theatre Chorus and Orchestra, conducted by Zdeněk Chalabala. Supraphon 1950
- Eva Děpoltová (Šárka), Vilém Přibyl (Ctirad), Václav Zítek (baritone, Prince Premysl), Jaroslavá Janska (soprano, Libina), Bozena Effenberkova (soprano, Svatava), Jitka Pavlová (soprano, Mlada), Anna Barová, (mezzo, Radka), Véra Bakalová (alto, Hosta), Daniela Suryova (alto, Castava), Eva Randová (mezzo-soprano, Vlasta), cs:Josef Klán (bass, Vitoraz). Brno State Philharmonic Orchestra, Brno Janáček Opera Chorus Conductor Jan Štych. Supraphon 1978
- Eva Urbanová (Šárka), Janez Lotrič (tenor, Ctirad), Dalibor Jenis (Prince Premysl), Ida Kirilová (Vlasta), Simona Šaturová (Libyna), sk:Adriana Kohútková (Svatava), Klaudia Dernerová Mlada; (mezzo) Hana Minutillo Radka; Marta Beňačková (Hosta), Adriana Hlasová (Castava) & Vladimir Kubovcik (Vitoraz). Vienna Concert Choir; Vienna Radio Symphony Orchestra conducted Sylvain Cambreling. Orfeo 1998 (Live, Wiener Konzerthaus)

== Roles ==
Role	Voice type	Premiere cast, 28 December 1897 (Conductor: Adolf Čech)
Ctirad	tenor	Bohumil Pták
Premysl	baritone	Václav Viktorin
Sárka	soprano	Růžena Maturová
Vitoraz	bass	Václav Kliment
Vlasta	mezzo-soprano	Anna Veverkova-Kettnerová
Libyna	soprano	
Svatava	soprano	
Mlada	soprano	
Radka	mezzo-soprano	
Castava	contralto	
Hosta	contralto	
