= Eva Urbanová =

Czech operatic soprano

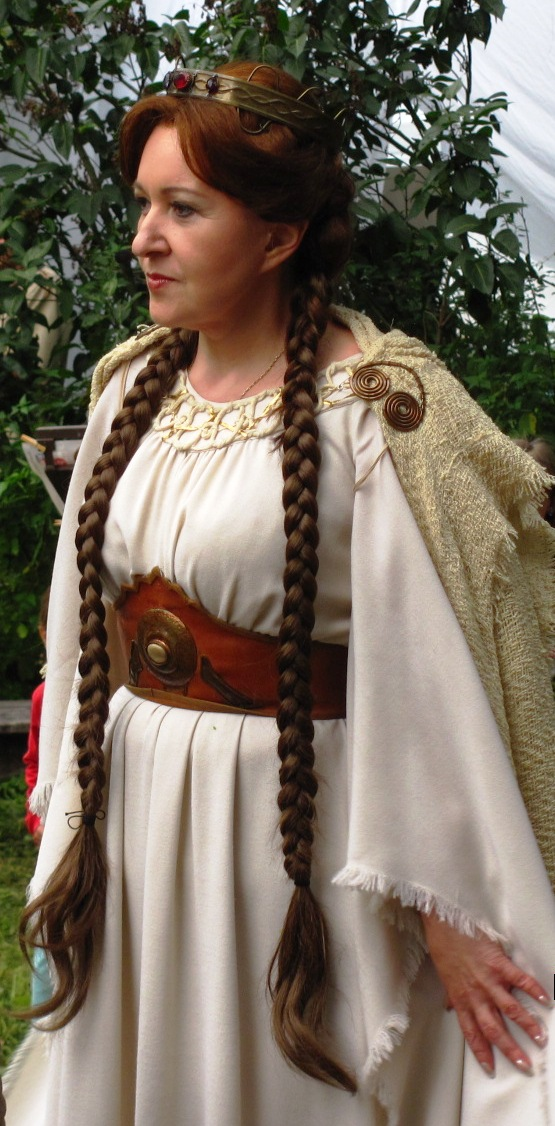
- As Libuše (September 2010)

Background information
- Born: 20 April 1961 (age 64); Slaný, Czechoslovakia
- Genres: Opera
- Occupation: Singer
- Instrument: Vocals
- Years active: 1987–present
- Website: evaurbanova.cz

Eva Urbanová (born 20 April 1961) is a Czech operatic soprano who has had an active international career since 1987. She has been a principal artist at the National Theatre in Prague since 1990 and has appeared as a guest artist at many of the world's best opera houses, including La Scala in Milan and the Metropolitan Opera in New York City. She has made several recording on the Supraphon music label and was honored with a Thalia Award in 1993. In 2003 she was presented with the Ordre des Arts et des Lettres by the Government of France.

== Biography ==
Urbanová was born in the hospital in Slaný, but her native village is Zvoleněves where she grew up. Later she moved to Vrčeň, where she has been living ever since.

She studied singing with Ludmilla Kotnauerová in Plzeň. She made her professional opera debut on 18 April 1987 at the J. K. Tyl Theatre in Plzeň, remaining at that theatre for the next three years. Among the roles she portrayed at that house include Amelia in Giuseppe Verdi's Un ballo in maschera, Julie in Antonín Dvořák's The Jacobin, and Milada in Bedřich Smetana's Dalibor.

Urbanová made her debut at the National Theatre in Prague on 16 March 1990 as Milada under the baton of conductor Zdeněk Košler. She became a member of that company the following September and the theatre continues to be he principal home to this day. Among the many roles she has sung in Prague are Amneris in Aida, Eboli in Don Carlos, Elisabeth in Tannhäuser, the Foreign Princess in Rusalka, Kostelnička Buryjovka in Jenůfa, Leonora in La forza del destino, Mařenka in The Bartered Bride, Minnie in La fanciulla del West, Ortrud in Lohengrin, The Princess in The Devil and Kate, Santuzza in Cavalleria Rusticana, and the title heroines in Adriana Lecouvreur, La Gioconda, Libuše, Zdeněk Fibich's Šárka, Janáček's Šárka, Suor Angelica, Tosca, and Turandot among others. In November 2009 she is scheduled to sing the title role in Richard Strauss's Salome under the baton of conductor Thomas Netopil.

Urbanová has also been active as a guest artist on the international opera stage. In 1993 she sang Donna Anna in Don Giovanni for her debut at the Grand Théâtre de la Ville de Luxembourg and Elisabetta di Valois in Don Carlos for her debut at the Opéra National du Rhin. In 1994 she made her United States debut at the Connecticut Grand Opera in her first portrayal of Tosca. In 1995 she sang Libuše at the Prague Spring Festival in a performance commemorating the end of World War II. In 1996 she made he debut at the Zurich Opera as Suor Angelica on short notice as a list minute replacement for an ailing singer, earning rave reviews from audience and critics.

On 28 June 1997, Urbanová made her debut at the Metropolitan Opera as Santuzza to the Turiddu of Vahan Khanzadian. She has since returned there to sing The Princess in Rusalka and the roles of Ortrud, Tosca, and Turandot. Urbanová also made her debut at La Scala in 1997 as Tosca. She has since made guest appearances at numerous other opera houses internationally, including the Canadian Opera Company, Den Norske Opera, the Deutsche Oper Berlin, the Los Angeles Opera, the Opéra National de Paris, the Prague State Opera, the Royal Opera, London at Covent Garden, and the San Francisco Opera.

Urbanová has also been active as a concert singer. In 1991 she had the distinction of opening the Prague Spring Festival as the soprano soloist in Dvořák's oratorio Saint Ludmila with the Czech Philharmonic under conductor Gerd Albrecht. She toured with that orchestra to Brussels the following year. In the early 1990s she was heard as the soprano soloist in Dvořák's Stabat Mater at the Frankfurt Opera, Janáček's Glagolitic Mass with the London Philharmonic Orchestra, and Bohuslav Martinů's Gilgameš with the BBC Symphony Orchestra. In 1996 she sang the Glagolitic Mass in Prague under conductor Sir Charles Mackerras. In 1997 she sang the soprano solos in the War Requiem for performances at the Salzburg Festival and in London.
