= Destiny (Janáček) =

Opera by Leoš Janáček

- Opera by Leoš Janáček
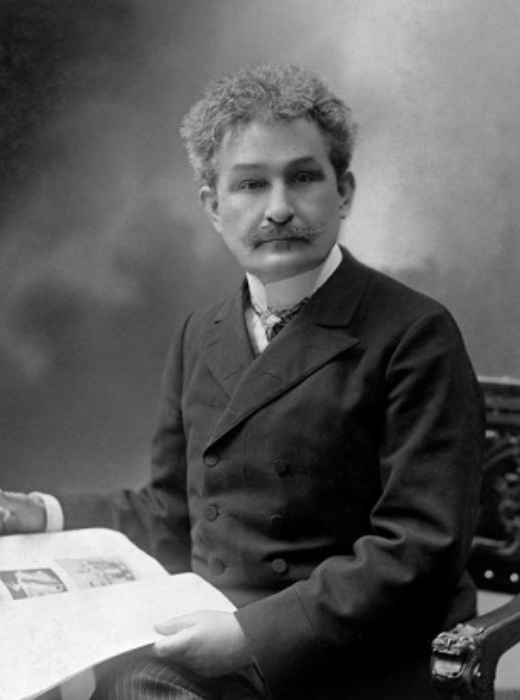
- Janáček in 1904
- Native title: Osud
- Librettist: Janáček; Fedora Bartošová
- Language: Czech
- Premiere: 1958; National Theatre, Brno

Destiny (also known as Fate, Czech: Osud) is an opera in three acts by Leoš Janáček to a Czech libretto by the composer and Fedora Bartošová. Janáček began the work in 1903 and completed it in 1907. The inspiration for the opera came from a visit by Janáček in the summer of 1903, after the death of his daughter Olga, to the spa at Luhačovice. There, Janáček met Kamila Urválková, who had been the subject of an opera by Ludvík Čelanský, Kamila, where she felt that Čelanský had falsely depicted her personality. After learning that Janáček was a composer, Urválková persuaded Janáček to write another opera to counteract Čelanský's portrait of her.

Janáček submitted the opera to the Brno Theatre in 1906, and to the Vinohrady Theatre in Prague in 1907, but both theatres rejected the score. The score stayed with the Vinohrady Theatre even after Janáček had threatened lawsuits against the theatre and after the Brno theatre made offers of a possible production.

The work did not receive a hearing until after Janáček's death, in 1934 on Brno Radio.

== Performance history ==
Osud was given in concert form in Brno in 1934, 1948 and 1954, all conducted by Břetislav Bakala. The first staging was in 1958 in Brno, conducted by František Jílek, as part of a complete cycle of operas at the 1958 Janáček Festival, in commemoration of the 30th anniversary of Janáček's death. However, the structure of the plot was altered from the original to give the story a "flashback" format, where the story begins with Act 3 and interpolates Act 1 and Act 2 as the "flashbacks", before returning to finish Act 3. One day after the Brno stage premiere, a version where the libretto was considerably revised (by Kurt Honolka) was produced at Stuttgart Opera.

The first UK staging was in 1984 at English National Opera, produced by David Pountney, in a translation by Rodney Blumer, but with Janáček's original plot structure intact. The first US production was in July 2003 at the Bard Summerscape Festival. Scholars have criticised weaknesses in the plot as the reason for the opera's neglect.

== Roles ==
Role	Voice type	Premiere Cast, first staging in Brno, 25 October 1958 (Conductor: František Jílek)
Míla Valková	soprano	Jindra Pokorná
Živný, a composer	tenor	Jaroslav Ulrych
Míla's Mother	soprano	Jarmila Palivcová
Dr. Suda	tenor	
First Lady	soprano	
Second Lady	soprano	
Old Slovak Woman	soprano	
Councillor's Wife	soprano	
Lhotský, a painter	baritone	
Konečný	baritone	
Miss Stuhlá, a teacher	mezzo-soprano	
Miss Pacovská	soprano	

== Synopsis ==
=== Act 1 ===
Míla and the composer Živný were once lovers, but Míla's mother ended the relationship in hopes of a more advantageous match for her daughter. Alas, Míla was already pregnant and is now a single mother, unlikely to marry anyone else. She and Živný meet again for the first time amid the amusements of a spa town. They sneak off together and rekindle their love, but her mother tracks them down in the crowd and predicts disaster.

=== Act 2 ===
Four years later Živný and Míla are married, but her mother lives with them and has become mentally fragile. While their young son Doubek plays, the couple read through the unfinished opera Živný began during their separation. It is filled with bitterness against Míla, portraying her as faithless. Míla's mother, losing her mind completely, repeats snatches of music from the opera before rushing to throw herself off a balcony. Attempting to restrain her mother, Míla too is pulled over, and both are killed.

=== Act 3 ===
Eleven years later, Živný's opera is at last to be performed, although it remains unfinished. He rehearses a chorus from the opera with his students, among them Doubek, now a young man. Another student, Verva, guesses that the hero of the opera is the composer himself. Through the music, Živný again relives his love for Míla and his cruelty to her. Tormented by regret, he asks Doubek to fetch a glass of water and then collapses, saying that the end of the opera must remain in God's hands. Doubek escorts him from the room.

== Recordings ==
- CRQ Editions: Burja Burian, Marie Bakalová, Marie Steinerová, Josef Válka, Frantisek Roesler; Brno Radio Symphony Orchestra conducted by Břetislav Bakala (reissue of Czech Radio Brno broadcast 4/6 December 1948)
- CRQ Editions: Jaroslav Ulrych, Libuše Domaninská, Marie Steinerová, Jaroslav Jaroš, Frantisek Roesler; Brno Radio Symphony Orchestra conducted by Břetislav Bakala (reissue of Czech Radio Brno broadcast 30 September 1954)
- Supraphon SU 0045-2 611: Jarmila Palivcová, Jindřich Doubek, Jindřich Doubek, Daniela Suryová, Marie Steinerová, Vilém Přibyl, Josef Škrobánek, Vladimír Krejčík, Jiří Holešovský, Antonín Jurečka, Jiří Olejníček, Jaroslav Souček, Richard Novák, František Caban, Anna Barová, Jaroslava Janská, Jarmila Hladíková, Jindra Pokorná, Jarmila Krátká, Zdenka Kareninová, Milena Jílková, Magdaléna Hajóssyová, Magda Polášková; Brno Janáček Opera Orchestra and Chorus; František Jílek, conductor (recorded 1975)
- Orfeo C 384 951 A: Peter Straka, Lívia Ághová, Marta Beňačková, Štefan Margita, Peter Mikuláš, Ivan Kusnjer, Ludmila Nováková-Vernerová, Martina Straková, Věra Přibylová, Lubomír Moravec, Richard Sporka, Lenka Kučerová, Vladimír Nacházel, Eva Zbytovská; Prague Chamber Choir, Chorus Masters Josef Pančík; Czech Philharmonic Orchestra, Gerd Albrecht, conductor (live recording 1995)
- Chandos CHAN3029 (sung in English): Helen Field, Philip Langridge, Kathryn Harries, Peter Bronder, Stuart Kale, Barry Mora, Christine Teare, Elizabeth Gaskell, Dorothy Hood, Catriona Bell, Mark Holland, Rebecca Moseley-Morgan, Samuel Linay, Michael Preston-Roberts, Yolande Jones, Cheryl Edwards, Mary Davies, Gaynor Keeble, Gareth Rhys-Davies, Philip Lloyd-Evans, Ralph Mason, Timothy German, Frances Manning; Welsh National Opera Orchestra and Chorus; Sir Charles Mackerras, conductor (recorded 1989)
