= Eva Děpoltová =

Czech singer

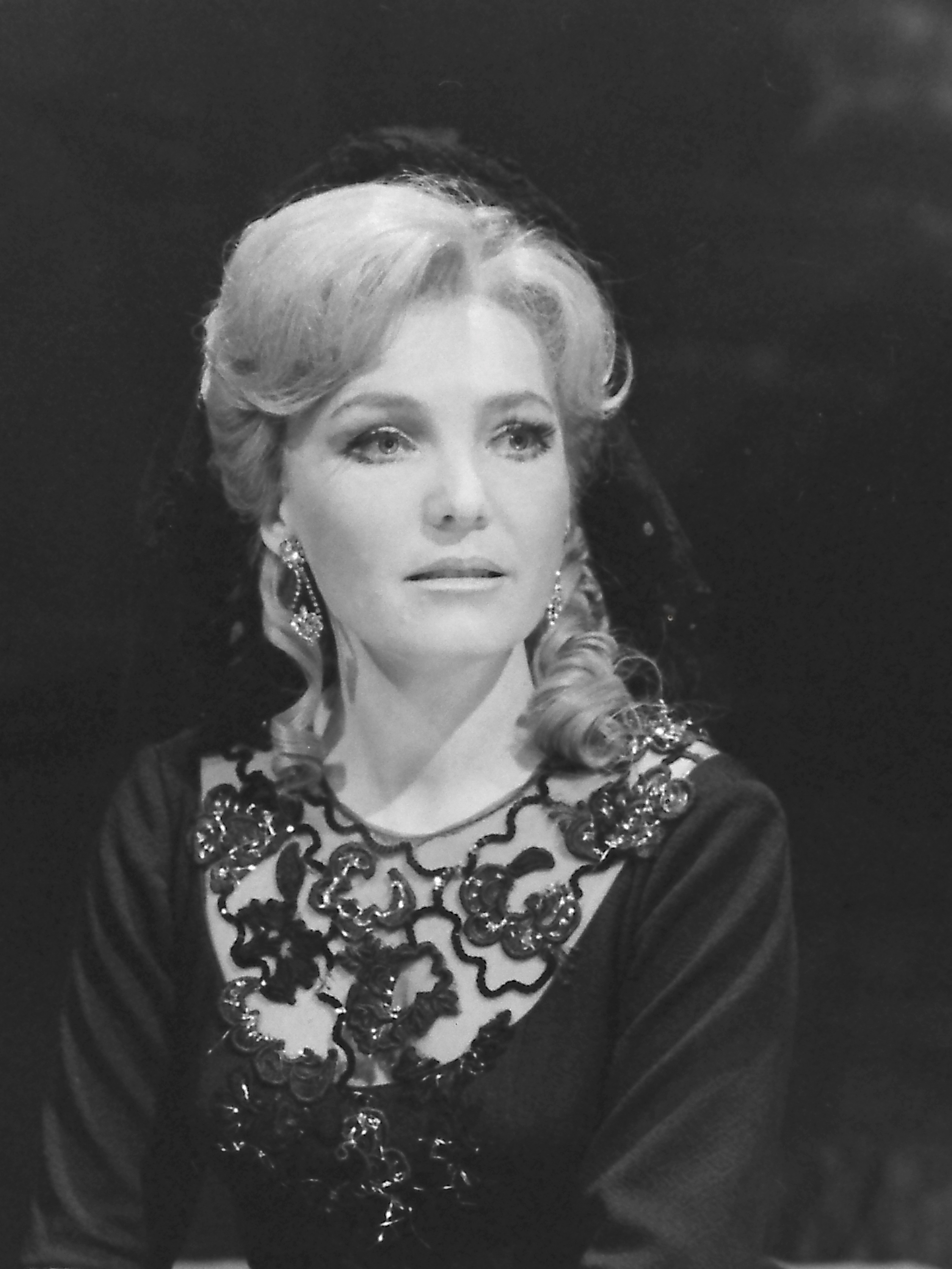

Background information
- Born: 5 August 1945
- Died: 16 July 2017 (aged 71)
- Instrument: Soprano singer

Eva Děpoltová (5 August 1945 – 16 July 2017) was a Czech operatic soprano.

She recorded the title role in Šárka (Fibich) opposite tenor cs:Vilém Přibyl as Ctirad in conductor Jan Štych's Supraphon recording of 1978. Her other regular roles include the title role in Libuše by Bedřich Smetana. and Donna Anna in Don Giovanni (Prague version of the opera)
