= Anthony Dean Griffey =

American opera tenor

Anthony Dean Griffey (born February 12, 1967 in High Point, North Carolina) is an American opera tenor. He is a regular presence on the stages of opera houses and concert halls around the world. Griffey has also been noted for his acting talent in addition to his voice.

In 2007, he starred alongside Audra McDonald and Patti Lupone in The Rise and Fall of the City of Mahagonny at the Los Angeles Opera, the recording of which won two Grammy Awards.

In the 2005 edition of Musical America, Griffey was cited as one of twelve young singers of distinction. Griffey was honored as an inductee into the North Carolina Music Hall of Fame in 2011.

In 2015, he was appointed as Professor of Voice at the Eastman School of Music.

Richard Dyer of the Boston Globe has said: "Griffey has voice, technique, musicianship, diction, and poetry in his soul."

== Early life and education ==
Anthony Dean Griffey was born in High Point, North Carolina to a family of little means. His parents worked at local furniture factories. He first began singing at the age of five at church. He started to study voice in high school, and subsequently attended Wingate University as a music major, with the intention of becoming a music minister. At the encouragement of his teachers at Wingate, Griffey auditioned successfully for the Eastman School of Music in Rochester, New York, where he studied with John Maloy. Griffey majored in vocal performance and literature, receiving a Master's of Music/Performer's Certificate. After completing his studies at Eastman, he was recommended by Rita Shane and Renée Fleming to audition at The Juilliard School for Beverley Peck Johnson, who would become Griffey's teacher and mentor until her death in 2001. Shortly after entering Juilliard he auditioned for James Levine and joined the Metropolitan Opera's Lindemann Young Artist's program.

== Career ==
While in the Lindemann program he made his debut at the Met in 1995 playing the First Knight in Parsifal. From 1995 to 2003, he continued to regularly appear in supporting roles at the Met, in such operas as Aida, Manon, Billy Budd, Die Zauberflöte, Susannah, The Flying Dutchman, The Queen of Spades, Boris Godunov, Salome, Tristan und Isolde, Don Carlo, among others.

Griffey's first major career breakthrough came in 1996 when, after auditioning for the role of Bob Boles in a student production of Peter Grimes at Tanglewood Festival, the conductor, Seiji Ozawa, was so impressed by his singing that he offered him the title role instead. Griffey later reprised this role in 1998 at the Metropolitan Opera, filling in for an indisposed Chris Merritt. Grimes would become Griffey's signature role, which he has performed to critical acclaim in Glyndebourne, Opera Bastille, Japan, San Diego, and Santa Fe, culminating in 2008, when the Metropolitan Opera mounted a new production of Grimes starring Griffey. Of the latter production, Justin Davidson of New York Magazine called Griffey's interpretation "one of the most richly textured and subtle characters to dominate the Met's vast stage in a long time."

Ozawa would become a major figure in Griffey's career, inviting him to sing the tenor solo in Beethoven's Ninth Symphony at the 1998 Winter Olympics in Nagano, Japan, as well as featuring him in a recording of War Requiem with the Saito Kinen Orchestra. In 1997, Griffey took on a role which would also become one of his signatures: Lennie in Carlisle Floyd's Of Mice and Men at the Glimmerglass Festival. He performed the role of Lennie to great success places such as Bregenz, the New York City Opera, the Houston Grand Opera (where he recorded it, as well) and for the Opera Australia at Sydney and Melbourne.

For his performances as Lennie in Australia, the 2012 Green Room Awards presented Griffey with the title of best Principal Male Opera performance. He was presented with the 2012 Helpmann Award for Best Male Opera Performance for his appearances as Lennie in Australia.

Other roles which Griffey has performed are Mozart's Idomeneo (at Mostly Mozart festival) Florestan in Beethoven's Fidelio (Opera Company of Philadelphia and the Florentine Opera), the Male Chorus in The Rape of Lucretia at the Houston Grand Opera, and the title role in Robert Kurka's The Good Soldier Schweik at the Glimmerglass Festival

In 2007, he starred as Jimmy Mahoney in Kurt Weill's Rise and Fall of the City of Mahagonny with the Los Angeles Opera. His performance was widely acclaimed, with Opera News describing his Jimmy as: "…a sensation. His well-knit voice, ranging from a hefty lower range to a clarion top, had no need for the production's microphones. His way with 'When the sky turns brighter' was particularly haunting, evoking pathos on the scale of 'E lucevan le stelle.'" This production was recorded on DVD, and subsequently was awarded the 2009 Grammy Awards for "Best Classical Album" and "Best Opera Recording". In 2010 Griffey performed the title role in Igor Stravinsky's Oedipus Rex at Avery Fisher Hall with the New York Philharmonic under the baton of Valery Gergiev.

He champions English-language vocal literature. At his New York recital debut at Zankel Hall, he premiered a new song cycle by André Previn, accompanied by the composer himself. Of this recital, Peter G. Davis of New York Magazine remarked: "Griffey sang everything utterly naturally, devoid of artifice yet still full of character and nuance…This is a big vocal talent."

Previn selected Griffey to perform and record the role of Mitch in his opera version of A Streetcar Named Desire at the San Francisco Opera. In 2013, he reprised the role of Mitch to critical acclaim in the New York premiere at Carnegie Hall and at the Lyric Opera of Chicago.

Griffey has been a frequent performer of concert repertoire, and has appeared with many of the world's leading orchestras including the New York Philharmonic, Boston Symphony, London Philharmonic, Montreal Symphony, Toronto Symphony, Vancouver Symphony, Orchestre de Paris, London Symphony Orchestra, Atlanta Symphony, St. Luke's Chamber Orchestra, Milwaukee Symphony, Minnesota Orchestra, Houston Symphony, Philadelphia Orchestra, Royal Scottish National Orchestra, RAI National Symphony Orchestra, San Diego Symphony, Vara Radio Orchestra - Amsterdam, The Halle, NHK Symphony Orchestra, Detroit Symphony Orchestra, Seattle Symphony, Chicago Symphony, Tonhalle Orchester Zürich, Munich Philharmonic Orchestra, Orquesta Nacional de España, and the Berlin Philharmonic.

He is a frequent guest at the world's most prominent festivals including the BBC Proms, Saito Kinen Festival, Edinburgh Festival, Tanglewood, Ravinia, Aspen Music Festival, Music Academy of the West, and Marlboro Music School and Festival.

In 2012, Griffey was presented with an Honorary Doctorate of Humane Letters from his alma mater, Wingate University

== Selected recordings ==
- André Previn: A Streetcar Named Desire; Orchestra of the San Francisco Opera (Deutsche Grammophon, 1998)
- Benjamin Britten: "Peter Grimes," London Philharmonic and The Glyndebourne Chorus with Mark Wigglesworth (Glyndebourne, 2000)
- Gustav Mahler: Symphony No. 8 in E flat Major; San Francisco Symphony with Michael Tilson Thomas (San Francisco Symphony, 2008)
- Carlisle Floyd: Of Mice and Men; Houston Grand Opera orchestra and chorus with Patrick Summers (Albany Records, 2004)
- Benjamin Britten: War Requiem; London Philharmonic Orchestra with Kurt Masur (LPO, 2006)
- Kurt Weill: The Rise and Fall of the City of Mahagonny; Los Angeles Opera orchestra and chorus with James Conlon (Euroarts, 2007)
- Benjamin Britten: Peter Grimes; Metropolitan Opera orchestra and chorus with Donald Runnicles (EMI Classics, 2008)
- Deems Taylor: Peter Ibbetson; Seattle Symphony and Chorale with Gerard Schwarz (Naxos American, 2009)
