= Zvoleněves =

- Municipality
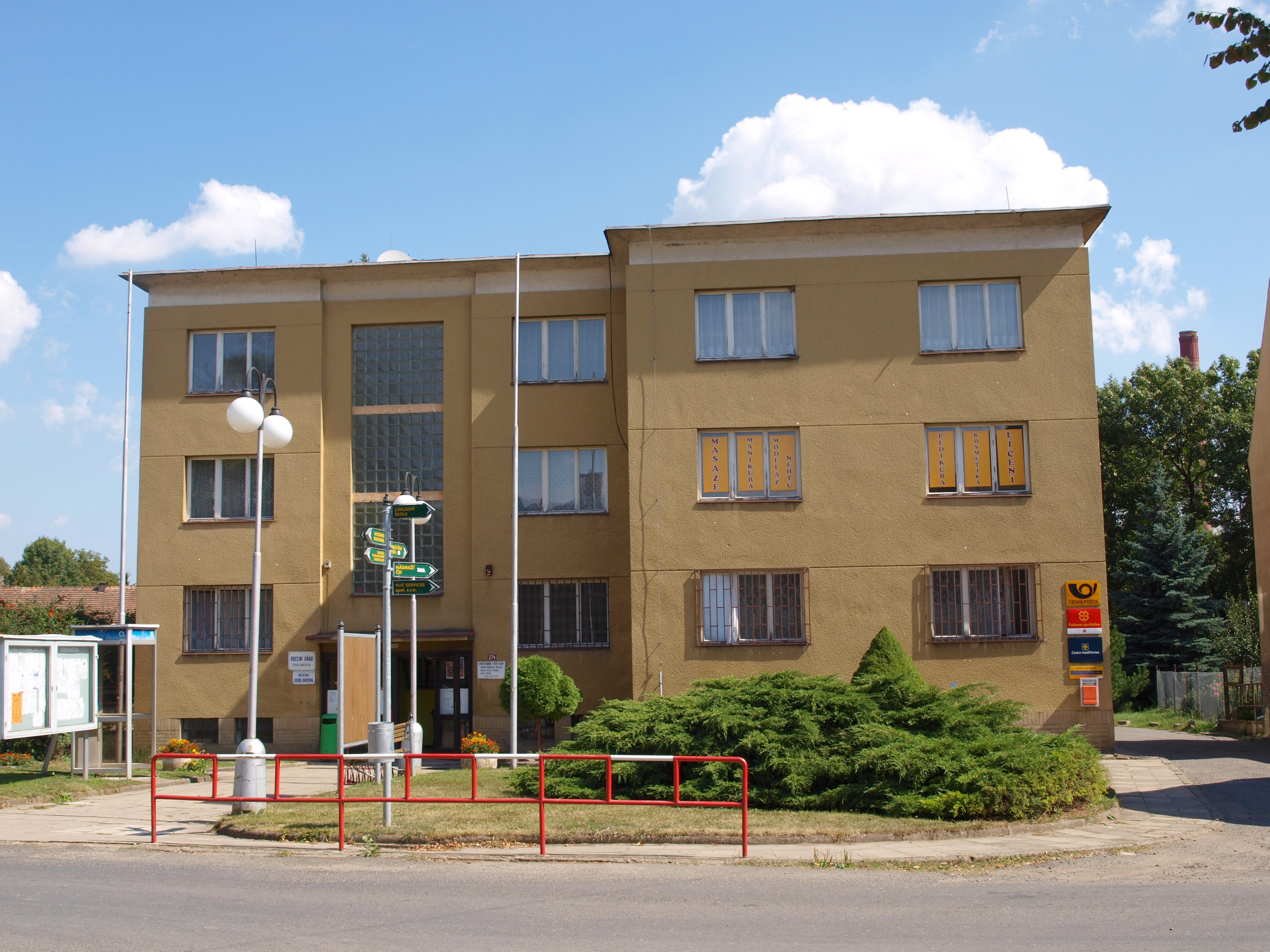
- Municipal office

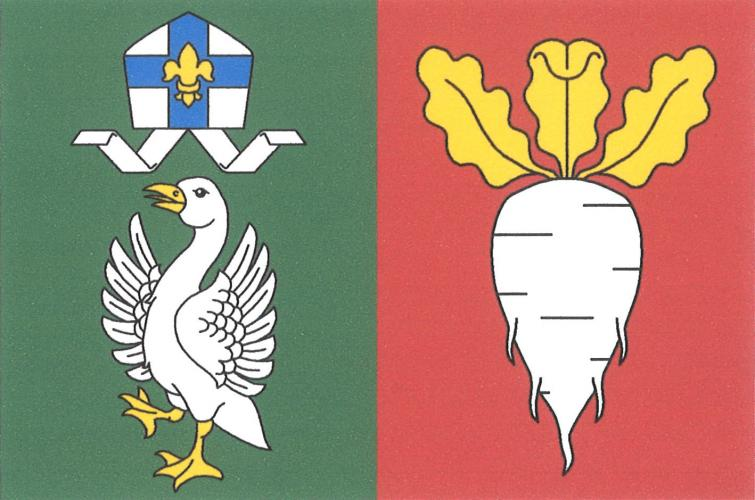
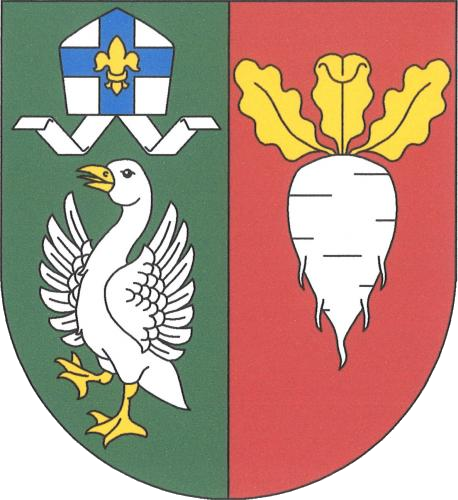
- Flag Coat of arms

- Location in the Czech Republic
- Coordinates: 50°13′52″N 14°10′56″E
- Country: Czech Republic
- Region: Central Bohemian
- District: Kladno
- First mentioned: 1318

Area
  - Total: 4.59 km^{2} (1.77 sq mi)
- Elevation: 218 m (715 ft)

Population (2026-01-01)
  - Total: 921
  - Density: 201/km^{2} (520/sq mi)
- Time zone: UTC+1 (CET)
  - Summer (DST): UTC+2 (CEST)
- Postal code: 273 25
- Website: www.zvoleneves.cz

Zvoleněves is a municipality and village in Kladno District in the Central Bohemian Region of the Czech Republic. It has about 900 inhabitants.

== Demographics ==
Historical population
Year	Pop.	±%
1869	978	—
1880	1,226	+25.4%
1890	1,238	+1.0%
1900	1,203	−2.8%
1910	1,199	−0.3%
1921	1,248	+4.1%
1930	1,272	+1.9%
1950	1,109	−12.8%
1961	1,095	−1.3%
1970	1,072	−2.1%
1980	983	−8.3%
1991	821	−16.5%
2001	797	−2.9%
2011	824	+3.4%
2021	885	+7.4%
Source: Censuses

== Notable people ==
- Eva Urbanová (born 1961), opera singer
