= Fryčovice =

- Municipality
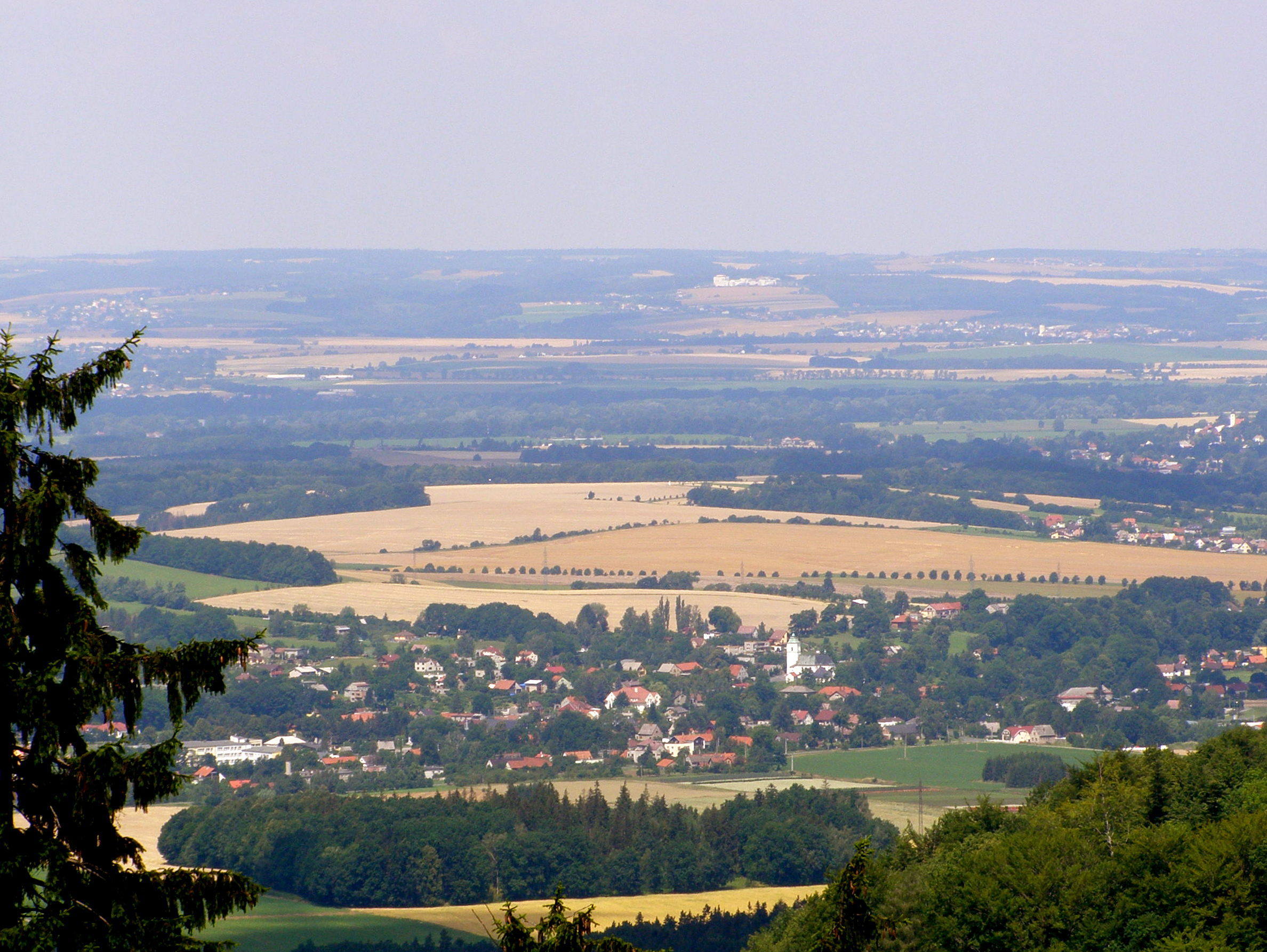
- View from the southeast

- Flag Coat of arms

- Location in the Czech Republic
- Coordinates: 49°40′0″N 18°13′24″E
- Country: Czech Republic
- Region: Moravian-Silesian
- District: Frýdek-Místek
- First mentioned: 1267

Area
  - Total: 16.45 km^{2} (6.35 sq mi)
- Elevation: 262 m (860 ft)

Population (2026-01-01)
  - Total: 2,431
  - Density: 147.8/km^{2} (382.8/sq mi)
- Time zone: UTC+1 (CET)
  - Summer (DST): UTC+2 (CEST)
- Postal code: 739 45
- Website: www.frycovice.cz

Fryčovice (German: Fritzendorf) is a municipality and village in Frýdek-Místek District in the Moravian-Silesian Region of the Czech Republic. It has about 2,400 inhabitants.

== Administrative division ==
Fryčovice consists of two municipal parts (in brackets population according to the 2021 census):

- Fryčovice (2,241)
- Ptáčník (51)

== Geography ==
Fryčovice is located about 8 kilometres (5 mi) west of Frýdek-Místek and 14 km (9 mi) south of Ostrava. It lies in the Moravian-Silesian Foothills. The highest point is at 381 m (1,250 ft) above sea level. The Ondřejnice River flows through the municipality.

== History ==
The first written mention of Fryčovice is from 1267. The village was founded by Bishop Bruno von Schauenburg around 1255. In 1950, the village of Ptáčník was annexed to the municipality.

== Demographics ==
Historical population

Year	Pop.	±%
1869	1,621	—
1880	1,659	+2.3%
1890	1,646	−0.8%
1900	1,797	+9.2%
1910	1,894	+5.4%

Year	Pop.	±%
1921	1,772	−6.4%
1930	1,831	+3.3%
1950	1,819	−0.7%
1961	2,002	+10.1%
1970	1,963	−1.9%

Year	Pop.	±%
1980	2,094	+6.7%
1991	2,149	+2.6%
2001	2,122	−1.3%
2011	2,314	+9.0%
2021	2,292	−1.0%

Source: Censuses

== Transport ==
The D48 motorway (part of the European route E462) from Nový Jičín to the Czech–Polish border in Chotěbuz crosses the southern part of the municipality.

== Sights ==
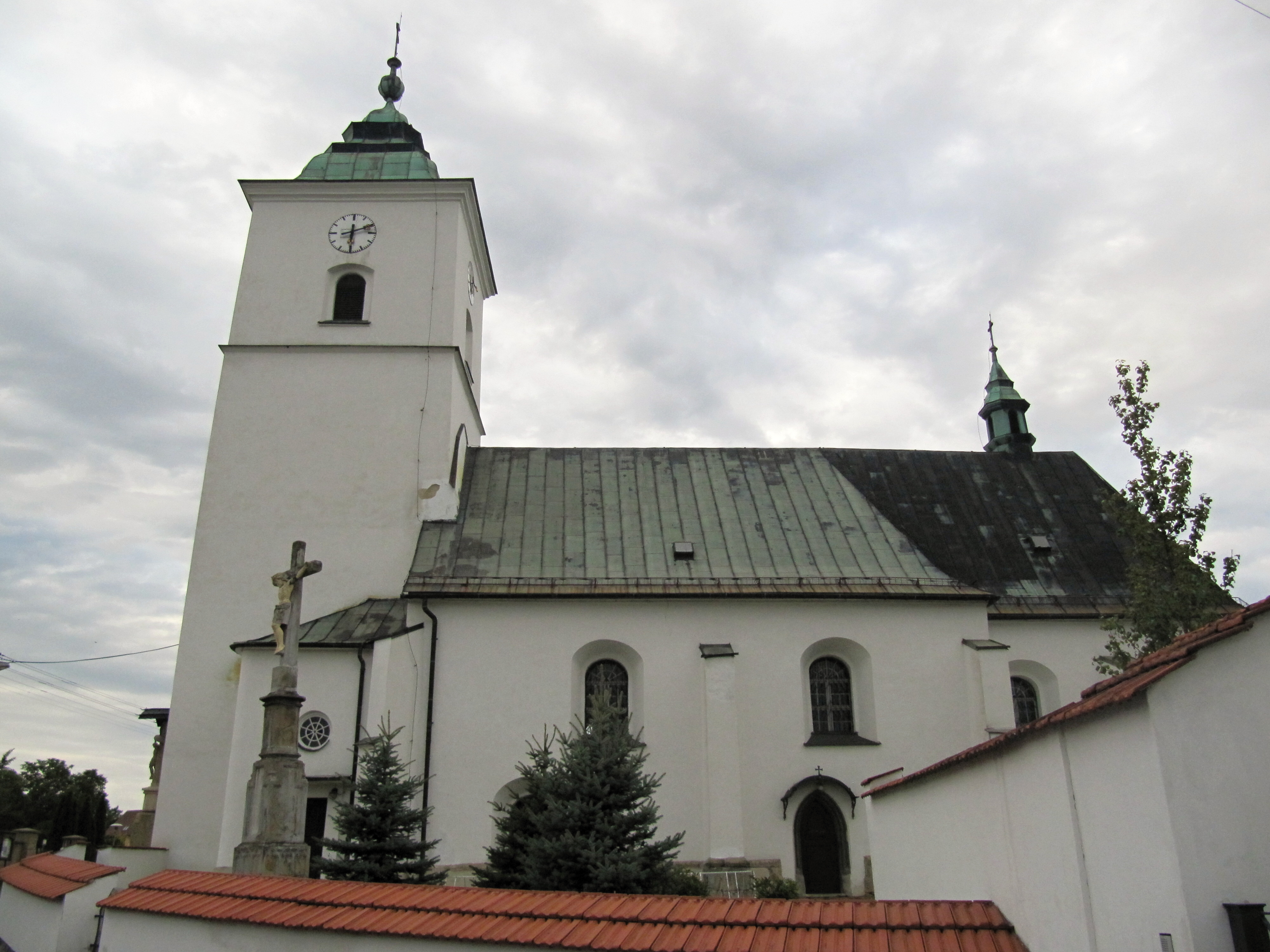
Church of the Assumption of the Virgin Mary

The main landmark of Fryčovice is the Church of the Assumption of the Virgin Mary. It was built in the Gothic style in 1335–1345. In the 16th and 17th centuries, it was rebuilt. In the 19th century, it was modified into its present form.

== Notable people ==
- Lubomír Havlák (1921–2014), opera singer
