= War Requiem =

Composition by Benjamin Britten

- by Benjamin Britten
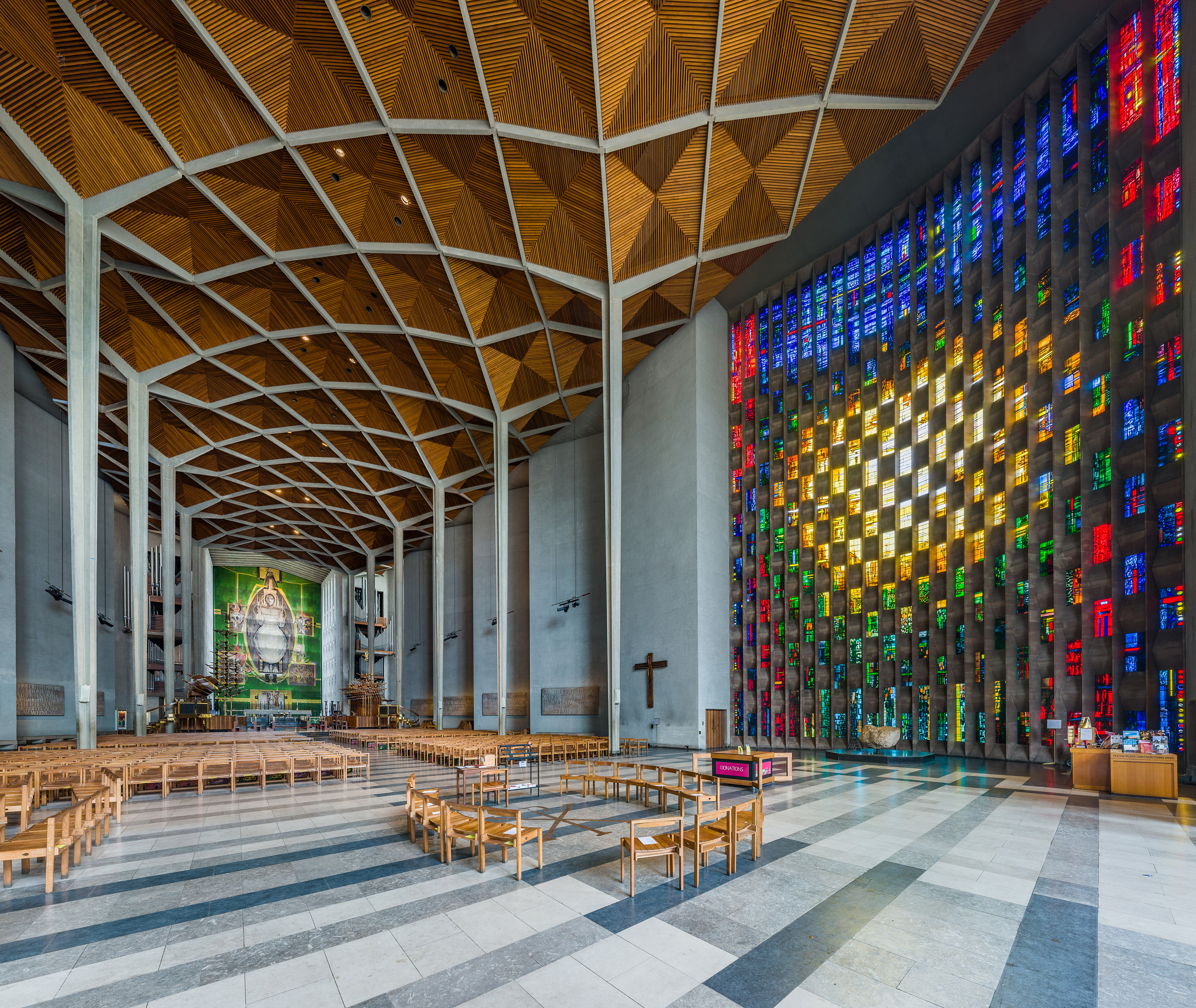
- Interior of the new Coventry Cathedral, where the Requiem was first performed
- Opus: 66
- Occasion: Consecration of the new Coventry Cathedral
- Text: Requiem; Poems by Wilfred Owen
- Language: Latin; English
- Composed: 1961–1962
- Dedication: Roger Burney; Piers Dunkerley; David Gill; Michael Halliday
- Performed: 30 May 1962
- Scoring: soprano; tenor; baritone; mixed choir; boys' choir; organ; orchestra; chamber orchestra

The War Requiem, Op. 66, is a choral and orchestral composition by Benjamin Britten, composed mostly in 1961 and completed in January 1962. The War Requiem was performed for the consecration of the new Coventry Cathedral, in the English county of Warwickshire, which was built after the original fourteenth-century structure was destroyed in a World War II bombing raid. The traditional Latin texts are interspersed, in telling juxtaposition, with extra-liturgical poems by Wilfred Owen, written during World War I.

Britten scored the work for soprano, tenor and baritone soloists, chorus, boys' choir, organ, and two orchestras (a full orchestra and a chamber orchestra). The chamber orchestra accompanies the intimate settings of the English poetry, while soprano, choirs and orchestra are used for the Latin sections; all forces are combined in the conclusion. The Requiem has a duration of approximately 80–85 minutes. In 2019, Britten's 1963 recording of the War Requiem was selected by the Library of Congress for preservation in the National Recording Registry for being "culturally, historically, or aesthetically significant".

== Composition ==
The War Requiem, first performed on 30 May 1962, was commissioned to mark the consecration of the new Coventry Cathedral, which was built after the original 14th-century structure was destroyed in a World War II bombing raid. The reconsecration was an occasion for an arts festival, for which Michael Tippett also wrote his opera King Priam.

Britten, a pacifist and conscientious objector, was inspired by the commission, which gave him complete freedom in deciding what to compose. He chose to set the traditional Latin Mass for the Dead interwoven with nine poems about war by the English poet Wilfred Owen. Owen, who was born in 1893, was serving as the commander of a rifle company when he was killed in action on 4 November 1918 during the crossing of the Sambre–Oise Canal in France, just one week before the Armistice. Although he was virtually unknown at the time of his death, he has subsequently come to be revered as one of the great war poets.

Philip Reed has discussed the progression of Britten's composition of the War Requiem in the Cambridge Music Handbook publication on the work. Britten himself acknowledged the stylistic influence of Requiems by other composers, such as Giuseppe Verdi's, on his own composition. David B. Greene has discussed Britten's 'indictment' of religious music in this work.

Britten dedicated the work to Roger Burney, Piers Dunkerley, David Gill, and Michael Halliday. Burney and Halliday, who died in the war, were friends of Peter Pears and Britten, respectively. According to the Britten-Pears Foundation's War Requiem website, Dunkerley, one of Britten's closest friends, took part in the 1944 Normandy landings. Unlike the other dedicatees, he survived the war but took his own life in June 1959, two months before his wedding. None of the other dedicatees have known graves, but are commemorated on memorials to the missing.

== Orchestration ==
The musical forces are divided into three groups that alternate and interact with each other throughout the piece, finally fully combining at the end of the last movement. The soprano soloist and choir are accompanied by the full orchestra, the baritone and tenor soloists are accompanied by the chamber orchestra, and the boys' choir is accompanied by a small portative organ (this last group ideally being situated at some distance from the full orchestra). This group produces a very strange, distant sound. The soprano and choir and the boys' choir sing the traditional Latin Requiem text, while the tenor and baritone sing poems by Wilfred Owen, interspersed throughout.

The full orchestra consists of the following instrumentation.

Woodwinds

3 flutes (third doubling piccolo)
2 oboes
1 English horn
3 clarinets (third doubling E♭ clarinet and bass clarinet)
2 bassoons
1 contrabassoon

Brass

6 horns
4 trumpets in C
3 trombones
1 tuba

Percussion

timpani

4 players:

2 antique cymbals (C & F♯)
glockenspiel
gong
bells (C & F♯)
vibraphone
cymbals
triangle
castanets
Chinese blocks
whip
bass drum
2 side drums
tambourine
tenor drum

Keyboard

piano
positive organ or harmonium
grand organ (Libera Me only)

Strings

first violins
second violins
violas
violoncellos
double basses

The chamber orchestra consists of the following instrumentation.

Woodwinds

flute (doubling piccolo)
oboe (doubling English horn)
clarinet (in B♭ and A)
bassoon

Brass

horn

Percussion

timpani
gong
cymbals
bass drum
side drum

Strings

harp

2 violins
viola
violoncello
double bass

== Movements and structure ==
The work consists of six movements:

1. Requiem aeternam (10 minutes)
  1. Requiem aeternam (chorus and boys' choir)
  2. "What passing bells" (tenor solo) – Owen's "Anthem for Doomed Youth"
  3. Kyrie eleison (chorus)
2. Dies irae (27 minutes)
  1. Dies irae (chorus)
  2. "Bugles sang" (baritone solo) – Owen's "But I was Looking at the Permanent Stars"
  3. Liber scriptus (soprano solo and semi-chorus)
  4. "Out there, we walked quite friendly up to death" (tenor and baritone soli) – Owen's "The Next War"
  5. Recordare (women's chorus)
  6. Confutatis (men's chorus)
  7. "Be slowly lifted up" (baritone solo) – Owen's "Sonnet On Seeing a Piece of our Heavy Artillery Brought into Action"
  8. Reprise of Dies irae (chorus)
  9. Lacrimosa (soprano and chorus) interspersed with "Move him, move him" (tenor solo) – Owen's "Futility"
3. Offertorium (10 minutes)
  1. Domine Jesu Christe (boys' choir)
  2. Sed signifer sanctus (chorus)
  3. Quam olim Abrahae (chorus)
  4. Isaac and Abram (tenor and baritone soli) – Owen's "The Parable of the Old Man and the Young"
  5. Hostias et preces tibi (boys' choir)
  6. Reprise of Quam olim Abrahae (chorus)
4. Sanctus (10 minutes)
  1. Sanctus and Benedictus (soprano solo and chorus)
  2. "After the blast of lightning" (baritone solo) – Owen's "The End"
5. Agnus Dei (4 minutes)
  1. Agnus Dei (chorus) interspersed with "One ever hangs" (chorus; tenor solo) – Owen's "At a Calvary near the Ancre"
6. Libera me (23 minutes)
  1. Libera me (grand organ, soprano solo and chorus)
  2. Strange Meeting ("It seemed that out of battle I escaped") (tenor and baritone soli) – Owen's "Strange Meeting"
  3. In paradisum (organ, boys' chorus, soprano and mixed chorus)
  4. Conclusion – Requiem Aeternam and Requiescant in Pace (organ, boys' choir and mixed chorus)

== Musical analysis ==
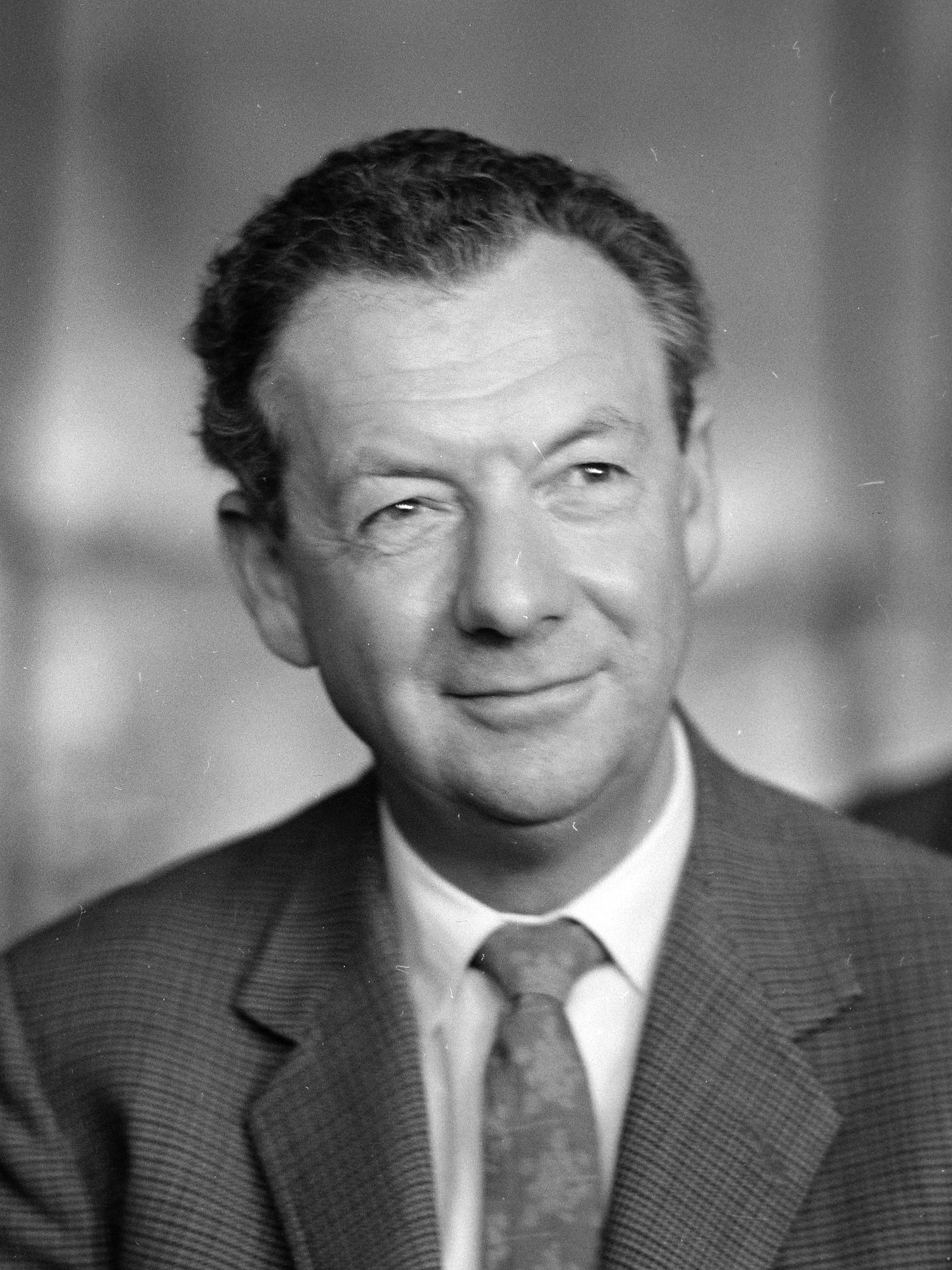
Britten in 1965

The interval of a tritone between C and F♯ is a recurring motif, the occurrence of which unifies the entire work. The interval is used both in contexts that emphasize the harmonic distance between C and F♯ and those that resolve them harmonically, mirroring the theme of conflict and reconciliation present throughout the work. The Requiem aeternam, Dies irae, and Libera me movements end in a brief choral phrase, consisting mainly of slow half notes, each first and second phrase ending on a tritone's discord, with every last (i. e. third) phrase resolving to an F-major chord; while at the end of the Agnus Dei the tenor (in his only transition from the Owen poems to the Requiem liturgy, on the key words, Dona nobis pacem – Give us peace) outlines a perfect fifth from C to G before moving down to F♯ to resolve the chorus's final chord. At the end of the Dies irae, the tenor sings (from Owen's "Futility") "O what, what made fatuous sunbeams toil, to break earth's sleep at all?" The notes of "at all" form the tritone and lead into the choir's formal resolution. In the final Owen setting, "Strange Meeting", one of the most prominent expressions of the tritone is sung by the tenor, addressing an opposing soldier with the words "Strange friend". This poem is accompanied by sporadic detached chords from two violins and a viola, which include the tritone as part of a dominant seventh chord. At the end of the poem, the final string chord resolves to the tonic, bringing the work to its final, reconciliatory In paradisum. On a more practical level, Britten facilitated musical execution of the tritone in the closing bars by having the F♯ sung in one voice, but the C in another.

Four other motifs that usually occur together are distinct brass fanfares of the Dies irae: a rising arpeggio, a falling arpeggio followed by a repeated note, a repeated fourth in a dotted rhythm ending in a diminished arpeggio, and a descending scale. These motifs form a substantial part of the melodic material of the piece: the setting of "Bugles sang" is composed almost entirely of variations of them.

Another linking feature can be found in the opening of the final movement, Libera Me, where the slow march tune in the double basses (preceded by two drums outlining the rhythm) replicates the more-rapid opening theme of the first poem, Anthem for Doomed Youth.

One striking juxtaposition is found in the Offertorium, a fugue in the repeating three-part-time scheme 6/8, 9/8, 6/8 where the choir sings of God's promise to Abraham ("Quam olim Abrahae promisisti, et semini eius" – "which you once promised Abraham and his seed"). This frames Owen's retelling of the offering of Isaac, in which the angel tells Abraham to:

'... offer the ram of pride instead of him.'
But the old man would not so, but slew his son,
and half the seed of Europe, one by one.

As the male soloists sing the last line repeatedly, the boys sing "Hostias et preces tibi, Domine" ("Sacrifice and prayers we offer thee, Lord"), paralleling the sacrifice of the Mass with the sacrifice of "half the seed of Europe" (a reference to World War I). The "reprise" of "Quam olim Abrahae" is sung in inversion, diminuendo instead of crescendo.

The whole of the Offertorium is a reference to Britten's earlier Canticle II: Abraham and Isaac from 1952. Britten here uses much of the musical material of the earlier work, but the music in the Requiem is twisted into much more sinister forms.

Although there are a few occasions in which members of one orchestra join the other, the full forces do not join until the latter part of the last movement, when the tenor and baritone sing the final line of Owen's poem "Strange Meeting" ("Let us sleep now ...") as "In Paradisum deducant" ("Into Paradise lead them ...") is sung first by the boys' choir, then by the full choir (in 8-part canon), and finally by the soprano. The boys' choir echoes the Requiem aeternam from the beginning of the work, and the full choir ends on the resolved tritone motif.

== Premiere and notable performances ==
=== Premiere ===
For the opening performance, Britten intended that the soloists should be Galina Vishnevskaya (a Russian), Peter Pears (an Englishman) and Dietrich Fischer-Dieskau (a German), to demonstrate a spirit of unity. Close to the premiere, the Soviet authorities did not permit Vishnevskaya to travel to Coventry for the event, although she was later permitted to leave to make the recording in London. With only ten days' notice, Heather Harper stepped in and performed the soprano role.

Although the Coventry Cathedral Festival Committee had hoped Britten would be the sole conductor for the work's premiere, shoulder pain forced his withdrawal from the main conducting role. He did, however, conduct the chamber orchestra, and this spawned a tradition of separate conductors that the work does not require and Britten never envisaged. The premiere took place on 30 May 1962, in the rebuilt cathedral with the City of Birmingham Symphony Orchestra, conducted by Meredith Davies (accompanying soprano and chorus), and the Melos Ensemble, conducted by the composer (accompanying tenor and baritone). At Britten's request, there was no applause following the performance. It was a triumph, and critics and audiences at this and subsequent performances in London and abroad hailed it as a contemporary masterpiece. Writing to his sister after the premiere, Britten said of his music, "I hope it'll make people think a bit." On the title page of the score he quoted Wilfred Owen:

My subject is War, and the pity of War.
The Poetry is in the pity...
All a poet can do today is warn.

Because of time zones, the southern hemisphere premiere was about 12 hours ahead of that in North America, though they were on the same day, 27 July 1963. The southern hemisphere premiere was at the Town Hall in Wellington, New Zealand, with John Hopkins conducting the New Zealand National Orchestra (now the New Zealand Symphony Orchestra) and the Royal Christchurch Musical Society, with soloists Peter Baillie, Graeme Gorton and Angela Shaw. The North American premiere was at Tanglewood, with Erich Leinsdorf conducting the Boston Symphony Orchestra with soloists Phyllis Curtin, Nicholas Di Virgilio, Tom Krause and choruses from Chorus pro Musica and the Columbus Boychoir, featuring boy soprano Thomas Friedman.

The Dutch premiere took place during the Holland Festival, in 1964. The Concertgebouw Orchestra of Amsterdam and the Netherlands Radio Choir were conducted by Bernard Haitink; the chamber orchestra (consisting of Concertgebouw Orchestra instrumentalists) by Britten himself. The soloists were Vishnevskaya, Fischer-Dieskau and Pears, in their first public performance together.

=== Other notable performances ===
The English Chamber Choir performed the work at Your Country Needs You, an evening of "voices in opposition to war" organised by The Crass Collective in November 2002.

To commemorate the eve of the 70th anniversary of the destruction of the original cathedral, a performance of the Requiem took place in the new cathedral on 13 November 2010, featuring the soprano Claire Rutter, the tenor Daniel Norman, baritone Stephen Gadd, The Parliament Choir, Saint Michael's singers, Deutscher Chor London, the ESO Chamber Orchestra, The Southbank Sinfonia and Coventry Cathedral Girls' Choir. It was conducted by Simon Over and Paul Leddington Wright. A recording was made and broadcast a day later on Classic FM. A second performance with the same performers took place on 17 November 2010 at Westminster Cathedral.

A 50th anniversary performance was given by the City of Birmingham Symphony Orchestra conducted by Andris Nelsons at Coventry Cathedral on 30 May 2012.

As part of Lincolnshire Remembers commemoration of the centenary of the end of the First World War, Lincoln Cathedral hosted a performance of Britten's War Requiem. On Saturday 3 November 2018, singers from Lincoln Choral Society, Gainsborough Choral Society, Scunthorpe Choral Society, Grimsby Philharmonic Society, Louth Choral Society, Neustadt Liedertafel, and the Choristers of Lincoln Cathedral were joined by the Lincolnshire Chamber Orchestra. The soloists were Rachel Nicholls (soprano), Alessandro Fisher (tenor) and Julien Van Mallaerts (baritone). The organist was Jeffrey Makinson, and the pianist was Jonathon Gooing. The conductors were Mark Wilde, Susan Hollingworth and Aric Prentice.

== Recordings ==
War Requiem

Studio album by Benjamin Britten
- Released: 1963
- Recorded: 1963
- Genre: Classical
- Length: 1:31:24
- Label: Decca Records
- Producer: John Culshaw

Benjamin Britten chronology
Sonata for Cello and Piano (1961)	War Requiem (1963)	Psalm CL (1962)

Professional ratings
Review scores
Source	Rating
AllMusic	5/5 stars

The first recording, featuring Vishnevskaya, Fischer-Dieskau and Pears, with the London Symphony Orchestra and The Bach Choir conducted by Britten, was produced by Decca in 1963. Within five months of its release it sold 200,000 copies, an unheard-of number for a piece of contemporary classical music at that time. Recording producer John Culshaw reports that Vishnevskaya threw a tantrum during the recording, as she believed – not having performed the work before – she was being insulted by being placed with the choir instead of at the front with the male soloists. The newest (2013) CD reissue of this recording includes 50 minutes of surreptitiously taped rehearsal footage at the time of the recording.

Other recordings of the work include the following:

- Testament: Heather Harper, Peter Pears, Dietrich Fischer-Dieskau; City of Birmingham Symphony Orchestra, Melos Ensemble; Coventry Festival Choir, Boys of Holy Trinity, Leamington and Holy Trinity, Stratford; Benjamin Britten, Meredith Davies, conductors (1962; recording of the premiere)
- VAI (DVD): Phyllis Curtin, Nicholas Di Virgilio, Tom Krause; Boston Symphony Orchestra; Chorus Pro Musica, Columbus Boychoir; Erich Leinsdorf, conductor (1963)
- Supraphon: Naděžda Kniplová, Gerald English, John Cameron, Czech Philharmonic Orchestra; Prague Philharmonic Choir, Kühn Children's Choir; Karel Ančerl, conductor (1966)
- Cascavelle: Heather Harper, Peter Pears, Thomas Hemsley; Orchestre de la Suisse Romande, Radio Suisse Romande Chorus, Choeur Pro Arte de Lausanne; Ernest Ansermet, conductor (1967)
- BBC Legends: Stefania Woytowicz, Peter Pears, Hans Wilbrink; New Philharmonia Orchestra, Melos Ensemble; New Philharmonia Chorus, Wandsworth School Boys' Choir; Carlo Maria Giulini, Benjamin Britten, conductors (1969)
- EMI Classics: Elisabeth Söderström, Robert Tear, Thomas Allen; City of Birmingham Symphony Orchestra; CBSO Chorus; Boys of Christ Church Cathedral Oxford; Sir Simon Rattle, conductor (1983)
- Telarc: Lorna Haywood, Anthony Rolfe Johnson, Benjamin Luxon; Atlanta Symphony Orchestra & Chorus; Atlanta Boy Choir; Robert Shaw, conductor (1988)
- Berlin Classics: Kari Løvaas, Anthony Roden, Theo Adam; Dresden Philharmonic; Leipzig Radio Chorus, Dresden Cathedral Boys Choir; Herbert Kegel, conductor (1989)
- Chandos: Heather Harper, Philip Langridge, John Shirley-Quirk; London Symphony Orchestra and Chorus; Choristers of Saint Paul's Cathedral; Richard Hickox, conductor (1991)
- Deutsche Grammophon: Ľuba Orgonášová, Anthony Rolfe Johnson, Boje Skovhus; Monteverdi Choir; Tölzer Knabenchor; NDR Sinfonie-Orchester; John Eliot Gardiner, conductor (1992)
- Live Notes: Sue Chen, Akeshi Wakamoto, Kwan-Dong Kim; Little Singers of Tokyo, Tokyo Academy Chorus, Tokyo Philharmonic; Kazushi Ono, conductor (1993)
- Klavier: Jeannine Altmeyer, Michael Sells, Douglas Lawrence; William Hall Orchestra and Chorale; William Hall, conductor (1994)
- Naxos: Lynda Russell, Thomas Randle, Michael Volle; BBC Scottish Symphony Orchestra; Scottish Festival Chorus; Martyn Brabbins, conductor (1995)
- Gothic: Christine Goerke, Richard Clement, Richard Stilwell; The Washington Orchestra and Chorus, Shenandoah Conservatory Choir, Maryland Boys Choir; Robert Shafer, conductor (1995)
- Helicon: Edith Wiens, Nigel Robson, Håkan Hagegård; Israel Philharmonic Orchestra; Prague Philharmonic Choir, Ankor Children's Choir; Kurt Masur, conductor (1996)
- Teldec: Carol Vaness, Jerry Hadley, Thomas Hampson; New York Philharmonic; Westminster Symphonic Choir, American Boychoir; Kurt Masur, conductor (1997)
- LPO: Christine Brewer, Anthony Dean Griffey, Gerald Finley; London Philharmonic Orchestra and Choir, Tiffin Boys' Choir; Kurt Masur, conductor (2005)
- Hänssler: Annette Dasch, James Taylor, Christian Gerhaher; Festivalensemble Stuttgart, Aurelius Sängerknaben; Helmuth Rilling, conductor (2007)
- Decca: Christine Goerke, Anthony Dean Griffey, James Westman; Saito Kinen Orchestra, Tokyo Opera Singers, Ritsuyukai Choir, SKF Matsumoto Choir, SKF Matsumoto Children's Chorus; Seiji Ozawa, conductor (2010)
- LSO Live: Sabina Cvilak, Ian Bostridge, Simon Keenlyside; London Symphony Chorus, Choir of Eltham College, London Symphony Orchestra; Gianandrea Noseda, conductor (2011)
- Challenge Classics: Evelina Dobracheva, Anthony Dean Griffey, Mark Stone; Netherlands Radio Philharmonic Orchestra; Netherlands Radio Choir, Netherlands Children's Choir; Jaap van Zweden, Reinbert de Leeuw, conductors (2011)
- Arthaus Musik (DVD): Erin Wall, Mark Padmore, Hanno Müller-Brachmann; City of Birmingham Symphony Orchestra; CBSO Chorus, CBSO Youth Chorus; Andris Nelsons, conductor (2012)
- BR Klassik: Emily Magee, Mark Padmore, Christian Gerhaher, Bavarian Radio Symphony Orchestra and Choir, Tölzer Knabenchor; Mariss Jansons, conductor (2013)
- Signum: Susan Gritton, John Mark Ainsley, Christopher Maltman; Gabrieli Consort & Players; Wroclaw Philharmonic Choir, Gabrieli Young Singers Scheme, Trebles of The Choir of New College Oxford; Paul McCreesh, conductor (2013)
- Warner Classics: Anna Netrebko, Ian Bostridge, Thomas Hampson; Orchestra dell'Accademia Nazionale di Santa Cecilia; Choir and Children's Choir of the Accademia Nazionale di Santa Cecilia; Antonio Pappano, conductor (2013)
- Munich Philharmonic: Anna Samuil, Toby Spence, Hanno Müller-Brachmann; Munich Philharmonic, Tölzer Knabenchor, Philharmonischer Chor München; Lorin Maazel, conductor (2017)

== Film adaptation ==
In 1988, Derek Jarman made a screen adaptation of War Requiem of the same title, with the 1963 recording as the soundtrack, produced by Don Boyd and financed by the BBC. It includes the final film performance of Laurence Olivier, in the role of an ageing war veteran.
