= Sabina Cvilak =

Slovenian operatic soprano

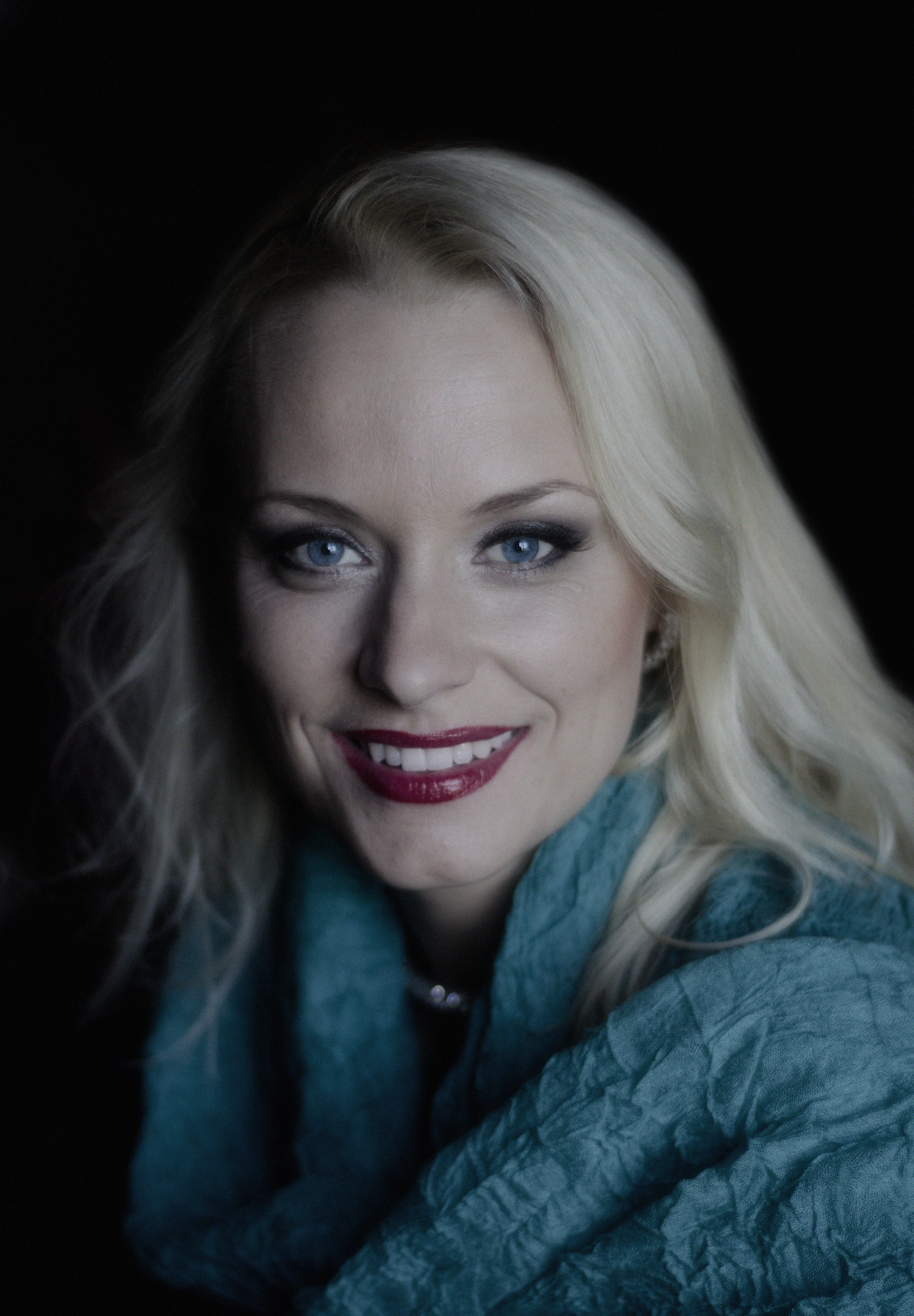
- Sabina Cvilak in 2011
- Born: July 8, 1977 (age 47); Maribor, Slovenia
- Occupation: Operatic soprano
- Organizations: Vienna State Opera; Washington National Opera; Maribor Slovene National Theatre; Staatstheater Wiesbaden
- Awards: Prešeren Fund Award Glazerjeva listina 2018
- Website: sabinacvilak.si

Sabina Cvilak (born 8 July 1977) is a Slovenian operatic soprano, who has appeared internationally, mostly at opera houses in Europe and the United States. Her stage presence is noted in portrayals of tragic female characters such as Puccini's Liù and Mimi, Janáček's Káťa Kabanová and Wagner's Sieglinde. She is also known for singing concerts and recitals, such as Britten's War Requiem in London on the centenary of the composer's birth.

== Career ==
Born in 1977 in Maribor, Cvilak graduated in 1996. She continued her studies in Graz with Annemarie Zeller. During her studies, she appeared as a guest at the municipal theatre of Leoben, as Barbarina in Mozart's Le nozze di Figaro, in Albert Lortzing's Der Wildschütz, in Léhar's Der Zarewitsch and Kálmán's Gräfin Mariza. She made her debut in Vienna in Ernest Bloch's Macbeth, staged by Keith Warner. She appeared at the Hamburg State Opera as Liù in Puccini's Turandot, a role she also sang for the Finnish National Opera in Helsinki. She was a member of the Vienna State Opera in the 2004/05 season, appearing in roles such as Papagena in Mozart's Die Zauberflöte and Woglinde in Wagner's Das Rheingold and Götterdämmerung.

In 2007, Cvilak appeared as Mimi in Puccini's La bohème at the Washington National Opera, making her debut there, followed by Micaëla in Bizet's Carmen, and Liù at the same venue. She performed the soprano solo part of Britten's War Requiem on 10 November 2013, the centenary of the composer's birth, at the Royal Albert Hall, with the BBC Symphony Orchestra and Chorus, the Crouch End Festival Chorus, the Choristers of Westminster Abbey, tenor Allan Clayton and baritone Roderick Williams, conducted by Semyon Bychkov.

She made her debut at the Hessisches Staatstheater Wiesbaden in 2015 in the title role of Janáček's Káťa Kabanová. A reviewer described her voice as souvereign, lyrical and effortless, and her acting as agile and truly creating the character. She appeared at the same venue in Wagner's Der Ring des Nibelungen in 2017 as Sieglinde, First Norne and Gutrune. A reviewer noted her large voice ("große Stimme") and her convincing portrayal of the gentle Sieglinde. Cvilak is scheduled to sing there the title role of Arabella by Richard Strauss, and Elisabeth in Wagner's Tannhäuser.

== Recordings ==
Cvilak recorded in 2012 the solo in Goffredo Petrassi's Magnificat (1939–40), with Gianandrea Noseda conducting chorus and orchestra of the Teatro Regio di Torino. Released the same year, she recorded the soprano solo part of Britten's War Requiem, 50 years after the premiere in the Coventry Cathedral. Noseda conducted the London Symphony Orchestra and Chorus, with soloists Ian Bostridge and Simon Keenlyside. A reviewer of The Guardian described her as "the thrilling, hieratic soprano".

== Awards ==
She received the Slovenian cultural Prešeren Fund Award in 2009. In 2018 she received the Slovenian / Maribor cultural award Glazerjeva listina.
