= Christchurch Town Hall =

Performing arts centre in Christchurch, New Zealand

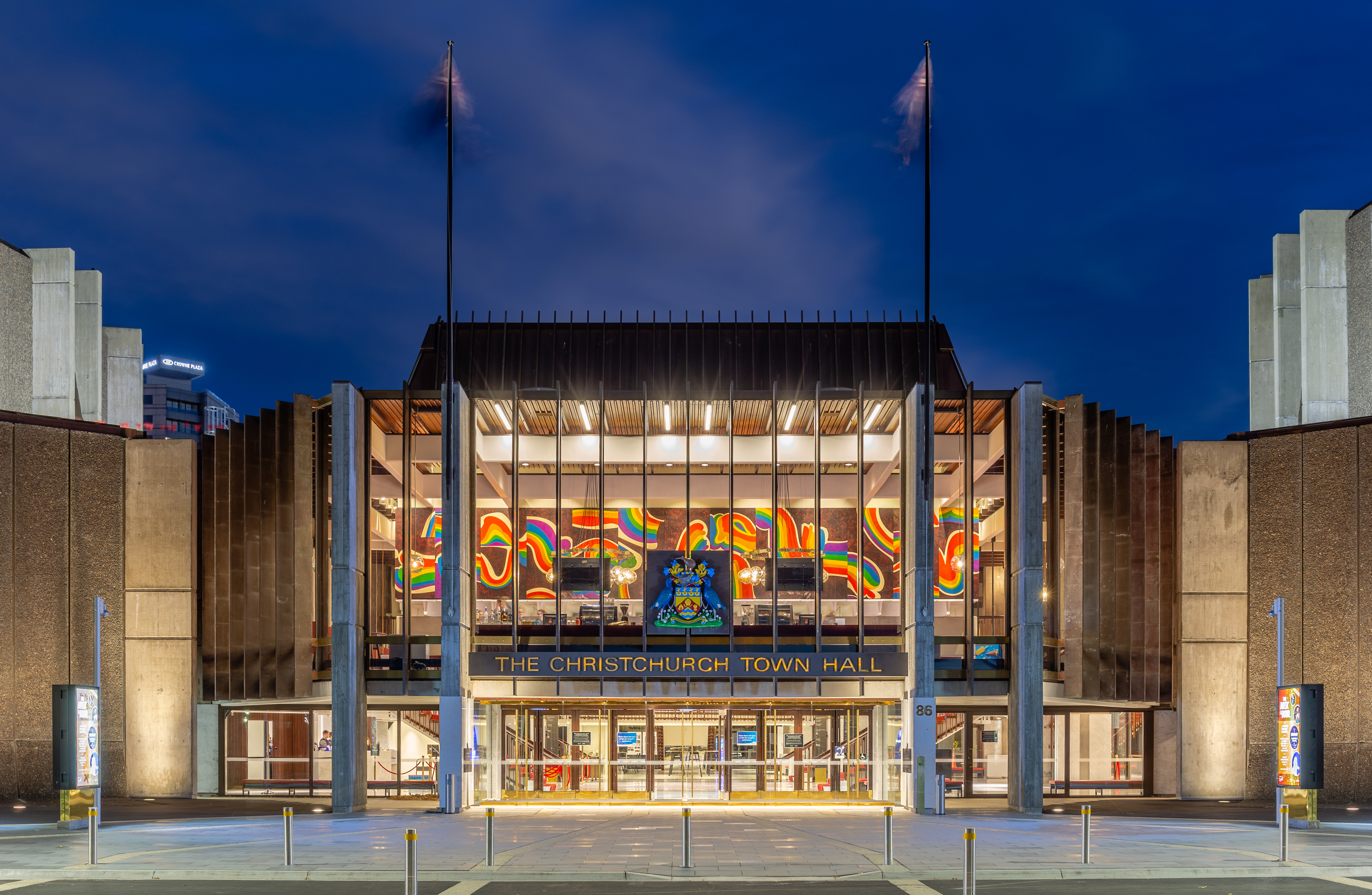
- Main entrance of the Christchurch Town Hall on Kilmore Street

General information
- Coordinates: 43°31′37.02″S 172°38′7.78″E
- Current tenants: Christchurch Symphony Orchestra
- Inaugurated: 1972
- Renovated: 2015-2019
- Owner: Venues Ōtautahi

Design and construction
- Architecture firm: Warren and Mahoney
- Main contractor: C S Luney Ltd
- Awards: NZIA Gold Medal 1973

Heritage New Zealand – Category 1
- Designated: 9 September 2020
- Reference no.: 9817

The Christchurch Town Hall, since 2007 formally known as the Christchurch Town Hall of the Performing Arts, opened in 1972, is Christchurch, New Zealand's premier performing arts centre. It is located in the central city on the banks of the Avon River overlooking Victoria Square, opposite the former location of the demolished Christchurch Convention Centre. Due to significant damage sustained during the February 2011 Christchurch earthquake, it was closed until 2019. Council staff initially recommended demolition of all but the main auditorium, but at a meeting in November 2012, councillors voted to rebuild the entire hall. In 2020, the town hall was registered as a Category I heritage building. The venue is owned and managed by Venues Ōtautahi, a Christchurch City Council-owned events and venues company.

== History ==
The first Town Hall in Christchurch was built on the corner of Hereford Street and Cathedral Square, from where one would look down Sumner Road (since renamed High Street). The verandah was used as hustings for elections.

In 1920, there were discussions in Christchurch about a suitable site for a town hall. The Canterbury Progress League considered the options and a site between Colombo Street, Kilmore Street, and the Avon River was favoured. The city's leading architects were asked for their opinion and they all concurred that of the various options, this site was superior. The architect Cecil Wood followed up in writing with the then-mayor, Henry Thacker, suggesting that the site under consideration should be extended to the north by closing Kilmore Street. This is the site that was eventually chosen for the town hall (south of Kilmore) and the Christchurch Convention Centre (north of Kilmore), but with the street kept open. (Note: The source states that Wood wrote to Mayor Thacker on 17 November 1929, but this is clearly wrong as Thacker was mayor from 1919 to 1923.)

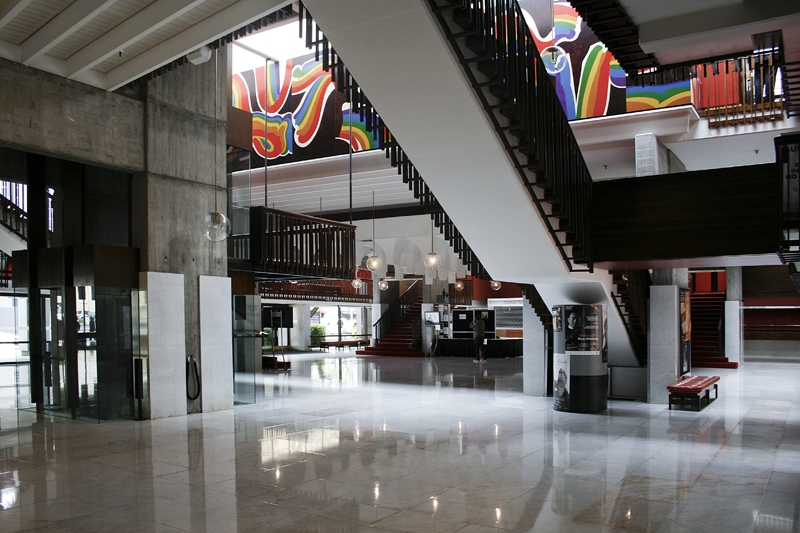
Foyer of the Christchurch Town Hall

The current building was part of an envisaged civic centre for Christchurch. Part I, the Christchurch Town Hall, was opened on 30 September 1972 by the Governor General, Sir Denis Blundell. The project was carried out by the then six metropolitan territorial local authorities, i.e. Christchurch City Council, Paparua and Heathcote County Councils, Riccarton and Lyttelton Borough Councils, and Waimairi District Council. The Town Hall hosted the weightlifting events and the wrestling events at the 1974 British Commonwealth Games.

Five of the local authorities were amalgamated in the 1989 local government reforms, and Lyttelton became part of Christchurch in March 2006, hence Christchurch City Council has sole responsibility for the venue these days.

Part II, new civic offices as a replacement for the Civic in Manchester Street, to be built on the corner of Kilmore and Durham Streets, cutting Victoria Street off from going through Victoria Square, was not built. Instead, the Christchurch City Council purchased Miller's Department Store in Tuam Street in 1978 and fitted this building out as the new civic offices, occupying the building in 1980. A hotel stood in the place that was set aside for the civic offices across Victoria Street.

== Description ==
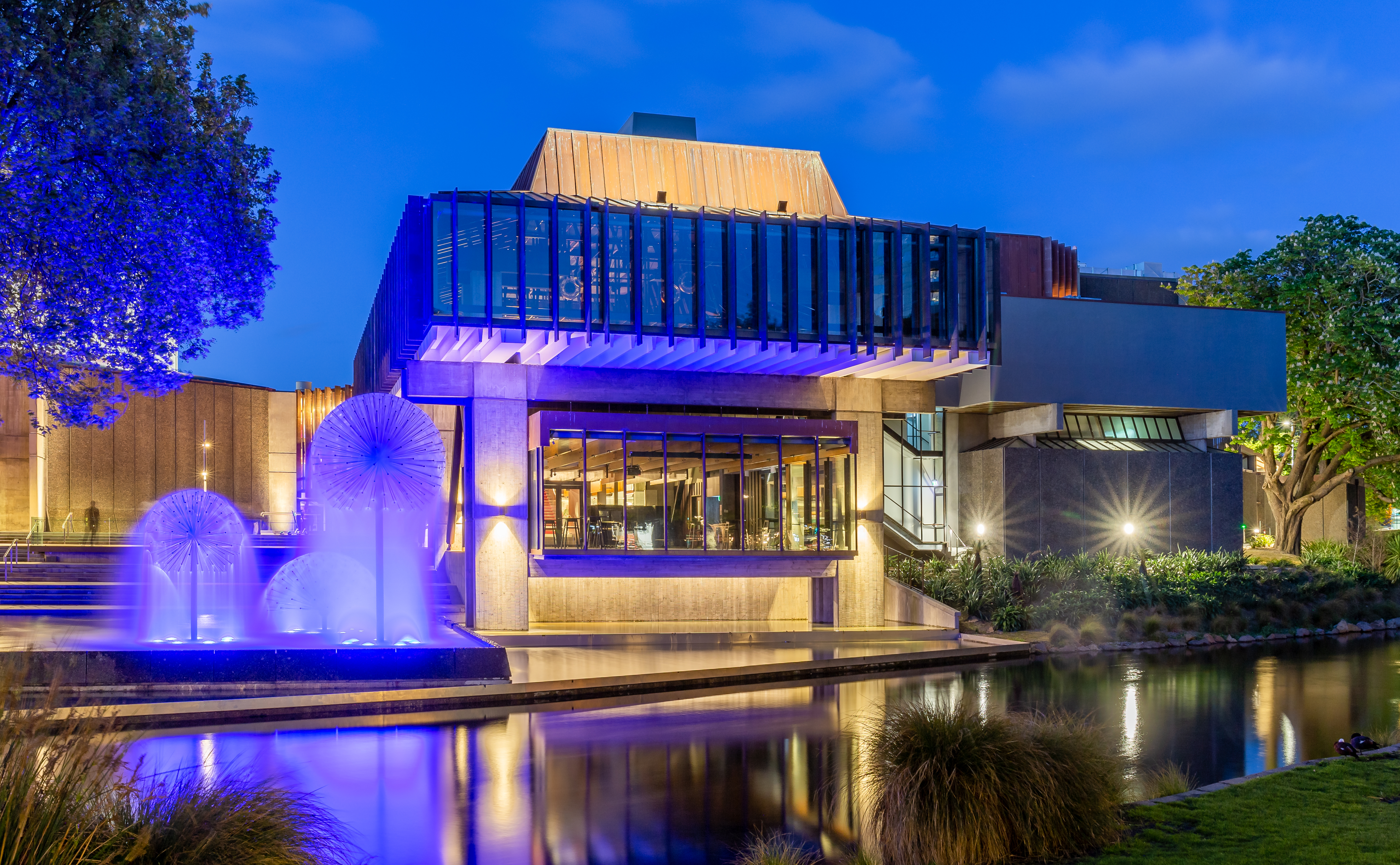
Christchurch Town Hall at dusk

The Christchurch Town Hall of the Performing Arts was designed for the presentation of a wide range of activities including orchestral concerts and recitals, opera, ballet and dramatic productions, musical comedy, variety, folk, rock and jazz concerts, conventions and conferences. It was designed by Sir Miles Warren and Maurice Mahoney of Warren and Mahoney Architects with acoustic assistance from Professor Harold Marshall. Lyall Holmes of Holmes Consulting advised on the building's engineering.

It hosts many civic functions, local cultural and commercial events, shows, and concerts. It is home to the Christchurch Symphony Orchestra, the Christchurch City Choir and several theatrical amateur groups.

=== Acoustic qualities ===
Marshall designed the main hall to have reflection panels on the sides of the auditorium. Acoustic design at the time was typified by an extended rectangular shape to achieve the desired sound quality, but none of the competition entries that Marshall saw were that shape; the final entry by Warren and Mahoney being elliptical. Therefore, he took inspiration from the Royal Festival Hall, devising the usage of panels to direct sound around the hall. This innovative feature formed the basis for modern concert hall design across the world; Marshall went on to advise on the Philharmonie de Paris and the Guangzhou Opera House.

In 2015, acoustics professor Trevor Cox called it one of the top 10 concert halls in the world. It has also been praised by Pierre Boulez and Leonard Bernstein, the former of which described it as "exceptional".

=== Layout and functionality ===
It has a 2,250-seat auditorium known for its acoustics and the 750 seat James Hay Theatre. The Town Hall has several rooms that complemented the Christchurch Convention Centre, but the venue on the opposite side of Kilmore Street was demolished in March / April 2012.

The Rieger pipe organ is also in the Christchurch Town Hall of the Performing Arts Auditorium and the curator is international concert organist Martin Setchell.

It also has the Limes Room and two Conference Rooms which are used for various functions and conferences.

On the ground floor of the complex was previously The Boaters Restaurant, which is run by the Ara Institute of Canterbury as a training venue for the hospitality industry. However following the rebuild is now the Avon room adding to the other function rooms.

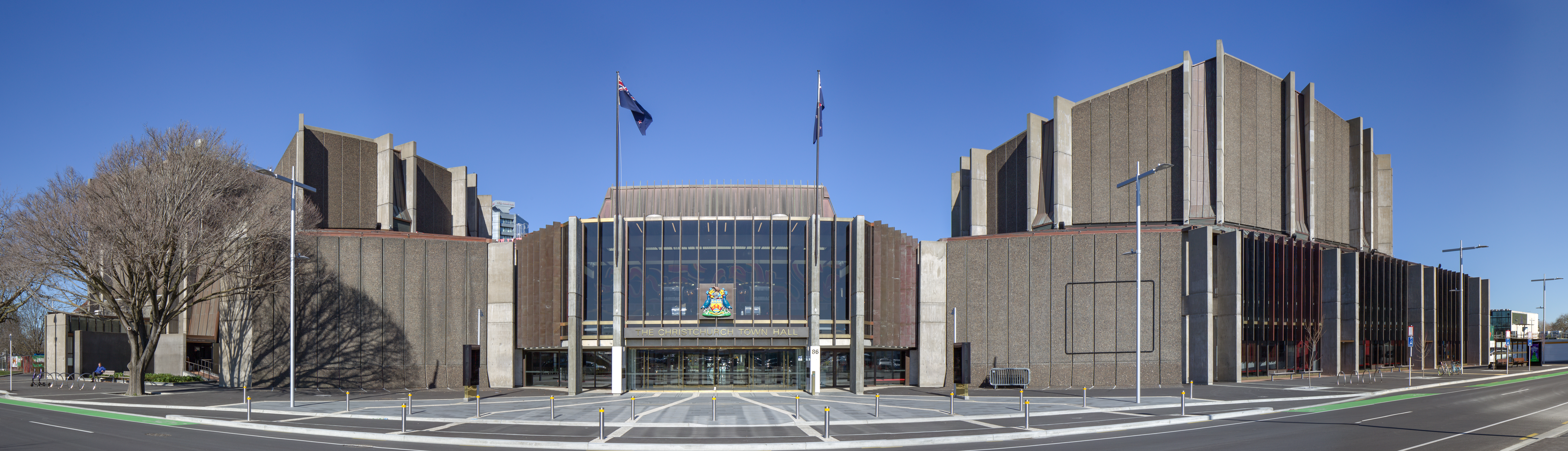
Frontview of the Christchurch Town Hall in August 2019

== Earthquake damage ==
The Town Hall was closed as a result of significant damage caused by the February 2011 Christchurch earthquake from liquefaction and the related lateral spreading of the ground towards the Avon River. In June 2011, an assessment of the building was underway to determine the extent of the damage. In October 2012, a staff report recommended that only the main auditorium be saved, with the rest of the building to be demolished.

On 22 November 2012, Christchurch councillors voted unanimously to rebuild it at a cost of $127.5 million, only $68.9 million of which would be covered by insurance. Earthquake Minister Gerry Brownlee could still however veto the plan. In August 2013, council staff presented four options to city councillors that would all retain the building, at a cost of around NZ$125m.

=== Restoration ===
On 11 June 2015 confirmation was given by the Christchurch City Council on the decision for the repairs of the Christchurch town hall to go forward. Work started in November 2015 with the foundations, which were replaced; new concrete columns will be installed into the ground to help support and stabilise the building. The project also added improvements to the town hall's design – for instance, the James Hay theatre, main auditorium, and restaurant was modified to fix issues present in the original layout.

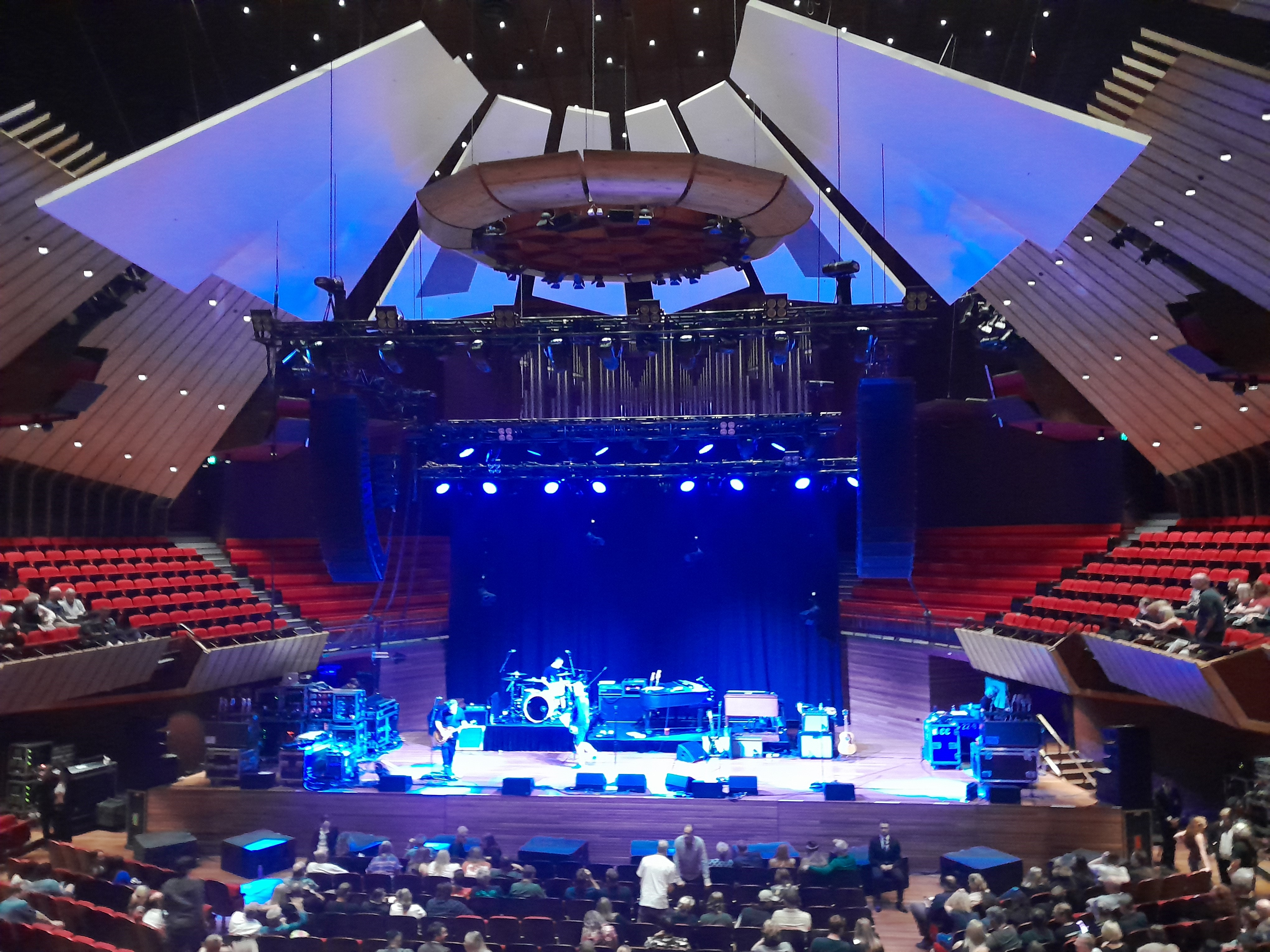
Interior of the main auditorium of the Christchurch town hall (March 2023)

The restoration was initially expected to be completed mid-2018, but the first part did not officially open until February 2019.

=== Heritage registration ===
On 4 September 2020, the town hall was designated a Category I Historic Place by Heritage New Zealand, reflecting the building's "outstanding international and national significance". Since the early 2000s, there has been an effort to recognise modernist architecture; the town hall is an exemplar of a brutalist building and a significant project in Christchurch Style architecture.
