= Vrčeň =

- Municipality
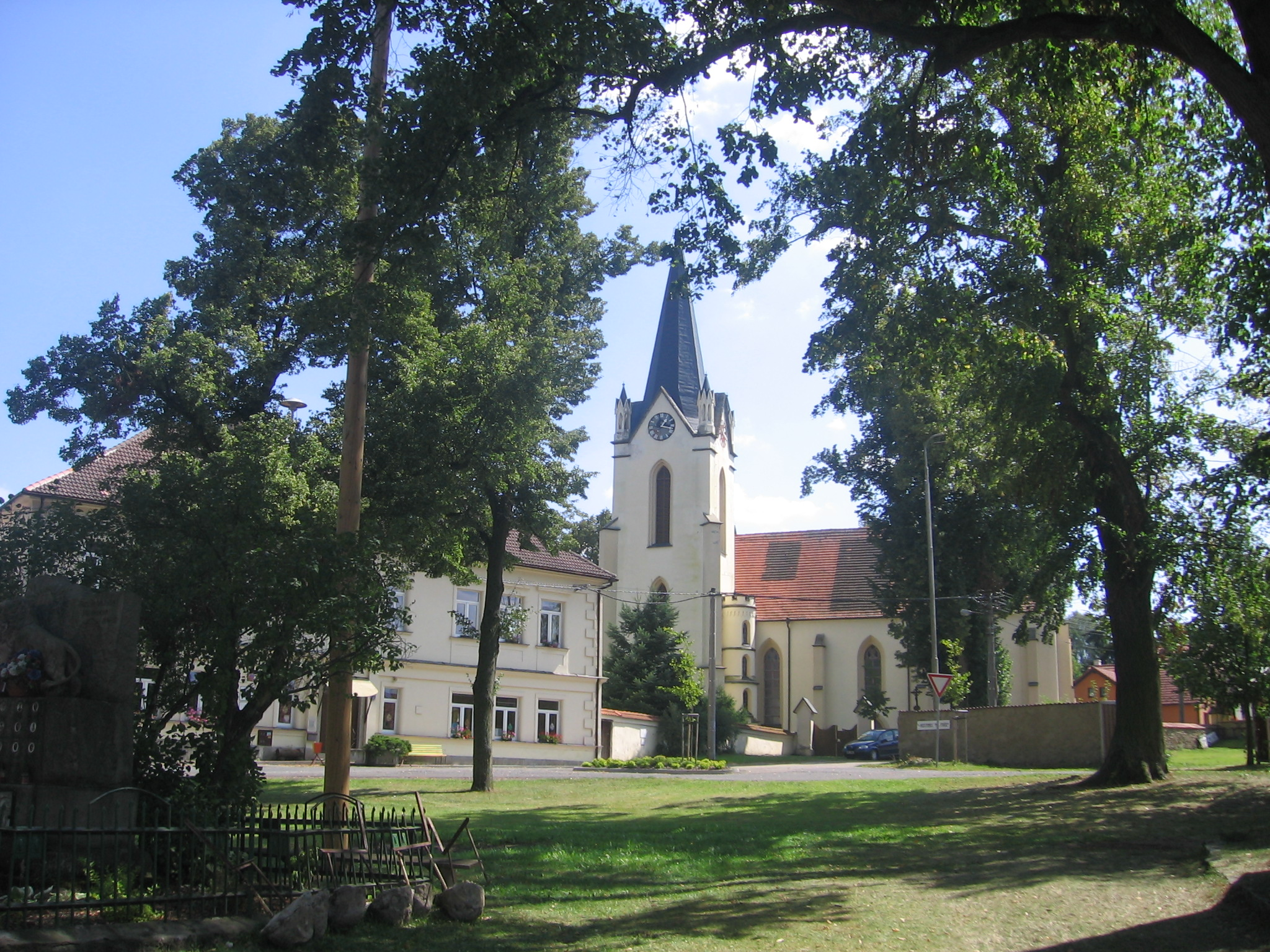
- Church of Saint Lawrence

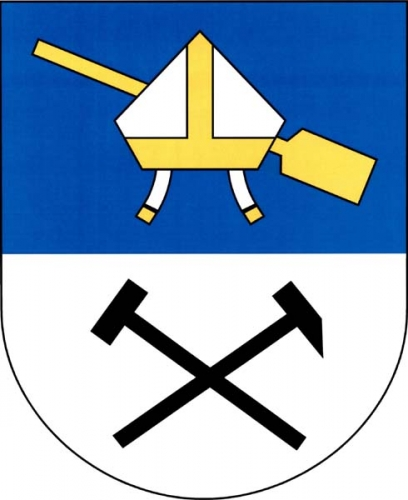
- Flag Coat of arms

- Location in the Czech Republic
- Coordinates: 49°30′29″N 13°37′8″E
- Country: Czech Republic
- Region: Plzeň
- District: Plzeň-South
- First mentioned: 1189

Area
  - Total: 7.06 km^{2} (2.73 sq mi)
- Elevation: 420 m (1,380 ft)

Population (2026-01-01)
  - Total: 408
  - Density: 57.8/km^{2} (150/sq mi)
- Time zone: UTC+1 (CET)
  - Summer (DST): UTC+2 (CEST)
- Postal code: 335 41
- Website: www.vrcen.cz

Vrčeň is a municipality and village in Plzeň-South District in the Plzeň Region of the Czech Republic. It has about 400 inhabitants.

Vrčeň lies approximately 33 kilometres (21 mi) south-east of Plzeň and 86 km (53 mi) south-west of Prague.

== Demographics ==
Historical population
Year	Pop.	±%
1869	572	—
1880	618	+8.0%
1890	569	−7.9%
1900	582	+2.3%
1910	575	−1.2%
1921	559	−2.8%
1930	521	−6.8%
1950	450	−13.6%
1961	440	−2.2%
1970	432	−1.8%
1980	397	−8.1%
1991	331	−16.6%
2001	324	−2.1%
2011	321	−0.9%
2021	342	+6.5%
Source: Censuses

== Notable people ==
- Eva Urbanová (born 1961), operatic soprano; lives here
