= Peter Baillie (tenor) =

New Zealand opera singer (1933–2025)

- Born: Peter David Baillie; 29 November 1933; Hastings, New Zealand
- Died: 18 June 2025 (aged 91); Wellington, New Zealand
- Occupation: Operatic tenor
- Spouse: Lois Noel (m. 1964)
- Children: 2

Peter David Baillie (29 November 1933 – 18 June 2025) was a New Zealand operatic tenor who was best known for his 22-year career with the Vienna Volksoper, where he performed more than 70 roles and was awarded the honorary title Kammersänger in 1987. In 1985, a documentary titled Peter Baillie's Vienna (1982) was filmed in Vienna about his cultural contributions.

== Early life and education ==
Peter Baillie was born in Hastings, New Zealand, on 29 November 1933 and grew up in Havelock North and later Palmerston North, where he attended Boys' High School. His mother sang and Baillie was a member of his church and school choirs.

He studied at Otago University for two years before settling in Wellington, where he pursued accountancy while remaining active in amateur music theatre and choirs. His started vocal training in 1956 under Donald Munro and later continued with Stanley Oliver and John Thompson.

== Career ==
=== Early career in New Zealand and Australia ===
Baillie joined the New Zealand Opera Company in 1959, and played leading tenor in La traviata, Le nozze di Figaro, and Don Pasquale. He was a finalist in the 1959 Mobil Song Quest and the resulting tours that helped secure New Zealand government support.

In 1960, he played the notary in Donizetti's Don Pasquale, where he met the Viennese director Stefan Haag.

In the early 1960s, Baillie moved to Australia, where he performed with the Elizabethan Trust Opera Company. His performances included Diesel and Tony in a six month run in West Side Story and Ferrando in Così fan tutte. The move had been suggested by his friend, Haag.

In 1963, he sang with the National Orchestra of New Zealand at the Civic Theatre in Christchurch. In 1965, he toured Australia and New Zealand with nine shows in two weeks as the soloist in Handel's Messiah. At the time, newspapers reported his intention to go to Munich in mid-1966 for more training and to explore his opportunities. In early 1966, he performed again with the renamed NZBC Symphony Orchestra.

=== Vienna Volksoper and European career ===
Baillie's first European engagement in 1966 was as soloist with the London Emmanuel Choir, followed the same year by Monteverdi's Vespers of the Blessed Virgin in Barcelona, Spain.

In 1966, Baillie relocated to Vienna, Austria. He joined the Vienna Volksoper on an initial two year contract and began to learn German. Baillie debuted on 9 January 1967 with a 13 word performance as a peasant in Halka.

Over a two decade career with the Volksoper, Baillie performed in over 70 productions, ranging from Mozart and Verdi to operetta and contemporary Austrian works. Notable roles included Albert in Albert Herring, Camille in The Merry Widow, Wenzel in The Bartered Bride, and Basilio in The Marriage of Figaro.

Baillie also performed at Glyndebourne, Wexford, Barcelona, Brussels, and with major orchestras including the Vienna Philharmonic. He appeared at the Royal Albert Hall in London and sang in oratorio performances including Messiah, War Requiem, and Franz Schmidt's The Book with Seven Seals. Baillie also worked extensively in the Netherlands, Germany, Norway, the United Kingdom, Ireland, France, Italy, Spain, Croatia (touring Mahler's Das Lied von der Erde with the Zagreb Philharmonic Orchestra), and the United States (performing with the Mormon Tabernacle Choir). He participated in the Volksoper operetta tour of Japan in 1979.

Baillie appeared frequently on Austrian radio, including the Heinz Conrads Show, and in Australia and New Zealand in recitals and broadcast programmes, notably Opera of the Week in New Zealand. In 1985, a documentary titled Peter Baillie's Vienna was filmed in Vienna about his cultural contributions, directed by Peter Coates and the production company TVNZ.

=== Return to New Zealand ===
In 1988, Baillie returned to New Zealand, where he remained active in concerts and teaching. He also served as a judge for the Wellington schools German language competitions at Victoria University of Wellington.

== Personal life ==
Baillie married Australian Lois Noel in 1964. The couple had two sons.

Baillie died on 18 June 2025 in Wellington, aged 91.

== Awards and honours ==
On 5 October 1987, Baillie was awarded the title of Kammersänger by the Vienna Volksoper.

== Works ==
Baillie made numerous recordings, including several LPs with the London Emmanuel Choir and one with Teresa Stich-Randall.

Although primarily known for live performances, selected recordings of Baillie's work are available online.
