= Ralph Mason =

English singer and actor (1938–2016)

Ralph Mason as Tolloller in Iolanthe (1967)

John Francis Mason (1 September 1938 – 10 August 2016), known by his stage name Ralph Mason, was an English singer best remembered for his performances in leading tenor roles with the D'Oyly Carte Opera Company in the 1960s and 1970s.

After service in the British army, ultimately as the personal secretary to Field Marshal Montgomery, Mason began a professional singing career in 1959, joining D'Oyly Carte later that year. From 1963 to 1965, he appeared in My Fair Lady, sometimes in the role of Freddie. He rejoined D'Oyly Carte from 1965 to 1973, becoming principal tenor. He then played Major Mark Blake in Coronation Street, returned briefly to D'Oyly Carte as a guest artist, and sang in concerts. In 1977 Mason joined Welsh National Opera as a chorister and small part player, where he remained until his retirement in 2003.

== Early life and career ==
Mason was born in Brighton, East Sussex, the son of Percival F. Mason and his wife Gladys (née Sercombe), and attended Brighton Grammar School. While his father fought in the Second World War, his mother worked at his aunt's cafe to support the family until his father returned to resume his business as a barber; still, the family was very poor. Mason was not academically inclined but showed early promise as a singer, performing as a boy soprano soloist with local church choirs where he could earn some pocket money. In school productions, he played tenor leads in Gilbert and Sullivan operas, including in H.M.S. Pinafore, The Pirates of Penzance and The Yeomen of the Guard. He later sang with the Sussex branch of The Gilbert and Sullivan Society. After completing school, he worked as a clerk at a coal company for a year. He was then conscripted into National Service, soon serving in the Royal Army Service Corps as a pay clerk, and eventually he became the personal secretary to Field Marshal Montgomery.

In 1959, upon his discharge, Mason appeared on the radio and in concert appearances, and studied voice, before joining the D'Oyly Carte Opera Company as a chorister, as John Mason, although he soon began using Ralph Mason as his stage name. He was eventually given the small parts of First and Second Citizen, and then Leonard Meryll in The Yeomen of the Guard and Luiz and Francesco in The Gondoliers. He married Anne Sessions, a D'Oyly Carte soprano, in Brighton in 1961. In 1963, he and his wife left D'Oyly Carte to spend two years in the cast of My Fair Lady, first at the Theatre Royal, Drury Lane in London and then on tour, where he understudied and sometimes appeared as Freddie.

He returned to D'Oyly Carte, again as a chorister, understudying and sometimes playing several of the leading roles. In 1967, he was promoted to principal tenor, appearing over the next half dozen years in the roles of Mr Box in Cox and Box, the Defendant in Trial by Jury, Alexis in The Sorcerer, Ralph Rackstraw in H.M.S. Pinafore, the Duke of Dunstable in Patience, Tolloller in Iolanthe, Cyril in Princess Ida, Richard Dauntless in Ruddigore, Leonard in Yeomen and Marco in The Gondoliers. Of his Alexis, W. R. Sinclair wrote in The Telegraph that "Mason engagingly mixed up woolly philosophising with a rapid reluctance to face the facts when he became the victim of his own idealism. His two big numbers ... were pleasantly stylish". Sessions left the company in 1969 and soon gave birth to the couple's daughter, Amanda (whom they called Mandy). The family established a home in Cheadle Hulme, Cheshire, where they lived in a flat above Sessions's parents; he disliked his mother-in-law intensely. He worked extensively with the concert group "The World of Gilbert and Sullivan", led by Peter Pratt. He left the company again in 1973.

== Later years ==
In 1973 Mason appeared as Major Mark Blake in the British soap opera Coronation Street, among several other television roles. After this, he returned briefly to D'Oyly Carte as a guest artist to play Cyril when Princess Ida was revived in 1974–75 and for the 1975 "Centenary Season" at the Savoy Theatre. In the 1970s, Mason was a freelance artist and had his own cabaret act, sang in various concerts and did TV commercials. He worked extensively with the concert group "The World of Gilbert and Sullivan", led by Peter Pratt. From 1975 he joined the "Opera for All" touring group for two seasons, with whom he had the opportunity to sing the roles of Gustavus in Un ballo in maschera, Tom Rakewell and the Auctioneer in The Rake's Progress, Eisenstein in Die Fledermaus and Don Ramiro in La Cenerentola, among others. In 1977 Mason was engaged by Welsh National Opera as a chorister and also played the small parts of First Prisoner in Fidelio, Don Curzio in The Marriage of Figaro, Remendado in Carmen, Blind in Die Fledermaus, Cherevin in From the House of the Dead, the Notary in La sonnambula (1989), the Chief Justice in Un ballo in maschera, Major Domo in Der Rosenkavalier, Leonato in Beatrice and Benedict, Babbetette in The Song of Fortunio and First Yeoman in The Yeomen of the Guard. He moved his family to Cardiff, Wales. His marriage to Sessions ended in divorce by the early 1980s. In 1984, Mason began dating Elizabeth Gaskell, a soprano with Welsh National Opera. They married in Cardiff in 1992 and had two sons, James and Jack. He retired from WNO in 2003, having been diagnosed in 2000 with transitional cell cancer that required surgery to remove a cancerous kidney and while he was undergoing treatment of the cancer in his bladder. Around the time of his retirement, he began to develop Parkinson's disease.

In 2011 Mason created a booklet, titled Aspects of Life: Verse and Worse, consisting of his own quirky poetry, jokes and anecdotes, with accompanying humorous newspaper snippets. He also wrote an autobiography, which he published in 2014 as an iBook, The Autobiography of Ralph Mason, and which is available online as Pass the Mustard. Among the many funny anecdotes in the autobiography is the following: "I once asked [Montgomery] if he had watched the two movies about the N. African Desert Campaign featuring James Mason as General Field Marshal Erwin Rommel? He replied that he had and said, "I thought that Mason fellow was splendid as Wommel! Indeed I thought at times, he was more like Wommel than Wommel was (sic)!" Here's another: "[In] Tosca the tenor Cavaradossi is shot by a firing squad. ... When one fateful night [all of the] rifles failed to go off ... the tenor, not quite sure what to do, flung himself on the floor, and we presume was meant to die of fright, a heart attack or a stroke! ... It was suggested, after the event, that the officer who was in charge of the squad and lowered his sword as the cue to fire, should have walked forward and cut the tenor's head off. We all felt this was a little extreme, especially as the shortage of good tenors continues to be a problem for opera casting depts."

Mason died in Cardiff, Wales, at the age of 77.

== Recordings ==
With the D'Oyly Carte Opera Company, Mason recorded the role of Ralph in H.M.S. Pinafore (1971) and a few numbers (but no solos) as Marco and Tolloller on a D'Oyly Carte collection titled Songs and Snatches (1970). He can also be heard as First and Third Yeoman on the Welsh National Opera's 1995 Telarc recording of Yeomen. He made various other recordings with Welsh National Opera, including Destiny (1992), Chandos CHAN3029, conducted by Sir Charles Mackerras.

== Sources ==
- Ayre, Leslie (1972). The Gilbert & Sullivan Companion. London: W.H. Allen & Co Ltd. ISBN 0-396-06634-8.
