= Magdaléna Hajóssyová =

Slovak opera singer and music educator (born 1946)

- Born: 25 July 1946 (age 80); Bratislava, Slovakia
- Education: Academy of Performing Arts in Bratislava
- Occupations: Soprano, professor
- Organization(s): Prague State Opera, Berlin State Opera
- Awards: Slovak Culture Prize Kritike Preis; 1977 – Faust a Margaréta; 1981 – Idomeneo; 1986 – Weber's Euryantha 1987 – Aulid by Ch. W. Gluck

Magdaléna Hajóssyová (25 July 1946, Bratislava) is a classical Slovak soprano who has had an active international career singing in operas, concerts, and recitals since the late 1960s. She has been particularly active at the Prague State Opera where she has been a principal artist since 1972. She has also had a long and fruitful partnership with the Berlin State Opera beginning in 1975. In 1977, 1981, and 1987, she won the Berlin Critic's Prize for her portrayal of the roles of Margarete in Charles Gounod's Faust, the Elektra in Mozart's Idomeneo, Carl Maria von Weber's Euryanthe, and Christoph Willibald Gluck's Iphigénie en Aulide.

In 1974 Hajóssyová was a recipient of the Slovak Culture Prize and in 2003 she was awarded the Rad Bieleho Prize by the Government of Slovakia for her work in performing and popularizing Slovak music on the international stage. She has also been awarded the National Prize of the German Democratic Republic and the J.W. Goethe Prize of the City of Berlin. She is currently the chair of the vocal music department at the Academy of Performing Arts in Prague. Several of her students have gone on to have successful careers, including Anda-Louise Bogza.

== Career ==
Hajóssyová studied singing under Maria Smutná-Vloká at the Bratislava Conservatory, and under Anna Hrušovská at the Music Academy of Bratislava before making her professional opera debut in 1967 as Barče in Bedřich Smetana's The Kiss at the Národní divadlo Brno. She sang at that house for the next four years, leaving in 1971 to join the roster of principal singers at the Slovak National Theatre in her home city. She made her debut at the National Theatre as Mařenka in Smetana's The Bartered Bride. She stayed there for only one year, singing mostly roles from Czech and Slovak operas by Smetana, Antonín Dvořák, Ján Cikker, and Eugen Suchoň.

In 1972, Hajóssyová accepted a contract at the Prague State Opera, and has remained active at that house ever since. Among the many roles she has sung there are Countess Almaviva in Le nozze di Figaro, both Donna Anna and Donna Elvira in Don Giovanni, Fiordiligi in Così fan tutte, Leonore in Fidelio, Mařenka, Míla Valková in Leoš Janáček's Destiny, Sophie in Werther, Vitellia in La clemenza di Tito, Xenie Mníškova in Dimitrij, the title role in Rusalka, and many roles in operas by Cikker.

In 1975, Hajóssyová made her debut at the Berlin State Opera and three years later was made a permanent member of the company. She became especially admired for her portrayal of Mozart heroines at that house, appearing in seven different Mozart operas with the company. She was particularly praised for her interpretation of the roles of Elettra in Idomeneo. She has also toured several times with the company, including a tour to Japan. She notably portrayed the title role in Carl Maria von Weber's Euryanthe for the re-opening of the reconditioned Berlin opera house in 1986. Another major triumph for her in Berlin was the role of Iphigenie in the 1987 production of Gluck's Iphigénie en Aulide. Some of her other roles in Berlin include Elsa in Richard Wagner's Lohengrin, Eva in Die Meistersinger, Gräfin Madeleine in Capriccio, Violetta in La traviata, and the title role in Arabella.

Hajóssyová has also worked extensively as a freelance artist on the international stage. Notable debuts include the Vienna State Opera (1976), the Bolshoi Theatre (1979), the Bavarian State Opera (1981), the Palais Garnier (1983), the Festival de Ópera de Las Palmas (1985), and the Liceu (1988). In addition she has appeared on the concert stage with major symphony orchestras in England, Austria, Belgium, France, Germany, Greece, Hungary, Japan, the Netherlands, Spain, and Italy.
