= Christchurch Convention Centre =

Convention centre in Christchurch, New Zealand

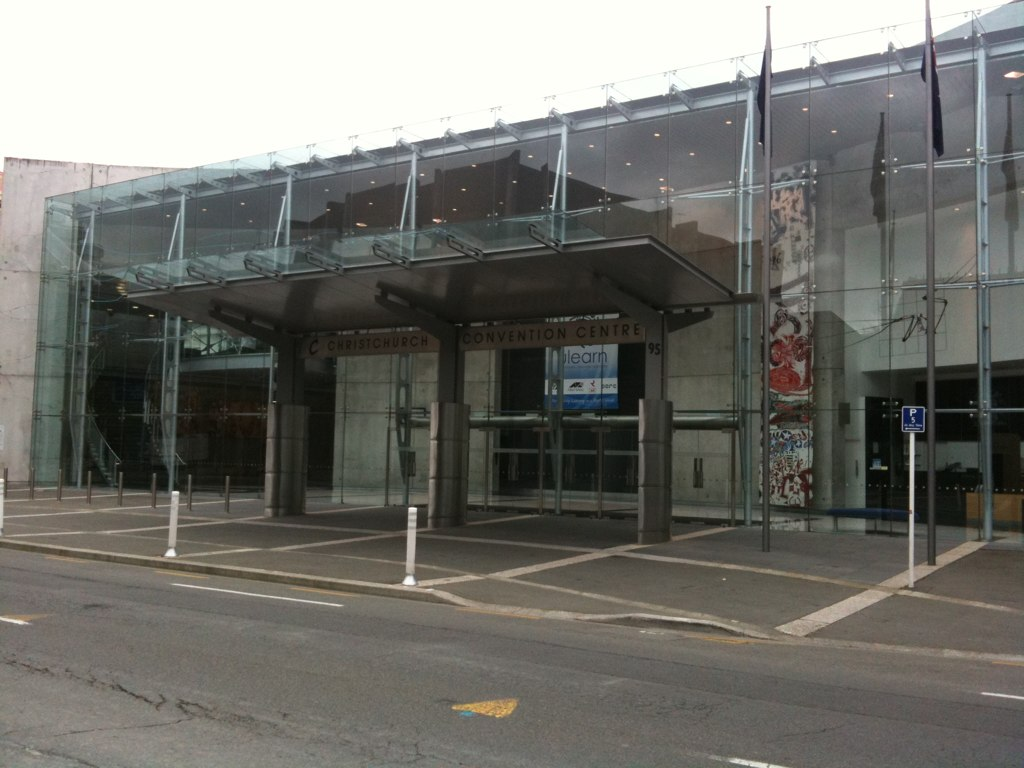
- Christchurch Convention Centre in 2009

General information
- Location: Kilmore Street
- Coordinates: 43°31′34.93″S 172°38′7.44″E
- Completed: 1997
- Inaugurated: November 1997
- Demolished: March / April 2012
- Owner: Vbase

Dimensions
- Other dimensions: 8 m high ceiling, 90 m length

Technical details
- Floor area: 1,850 square metres (19,900 sq ft)

Design and construction
- Architecture firm: Woods Bagot
- Awards: 1997 NZIA Local Award

References
- Architects' website

The Christchurch Convention Centre was New Zealand's only purpose-built convention centre, in Christchurch, the South Island's largest city. It was opened by the mayor of Christchurch, Vicki Buck, in November 1997, and was demolished in early 2012 following the 2011 Christchurch earthquake.

== Description ==
The Christchurch Convention Centre was located in Kilmore Street in the city centre.

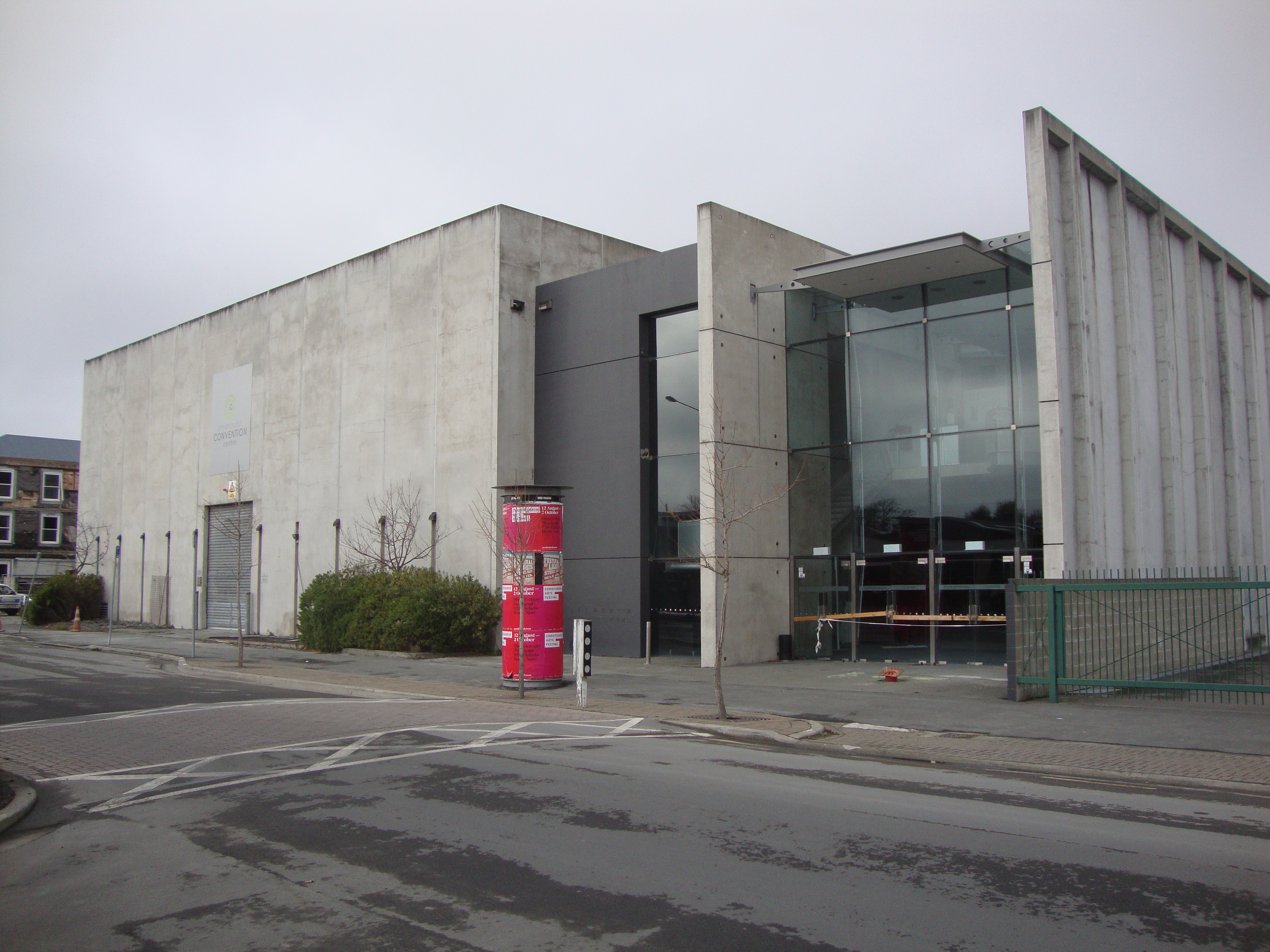
The rear entrance of the Christchurch Convention Centre in Peterborough Street

The design was an extruded concrete box with a glass façade facing the Christchurch Town Hall across Kilmore Street, over which a glazed airbridge linked these two and the Crowne Plaza Hotel, adjacent to the Town Hall.

The Christchurch Convention Centre had a capacity of 2,500 people. There were seven breakout rooms, and three halls that could be hired separately or together, to host major plenary sessions for 2,200 people theatre-style.

Two major artworks were featured in the building: "Blue" a neon sculpture by Bill Cuthbert, was on the façade, and the 84 m mural "Passport to the New Millennium", by Philip Trusttum was in the circulation space that ran the full length of the building.

The Christchurch Convention Centre hosted many international conferences including APEC Small and Medium Enterprise Economics Conference, Shiseido Japan, New Zealand Law Society, Law ASIA, and the 11th Asian Retailers Conference and Exhibition, as well as many charity gala dinners.

== Christchurch earthquake ==
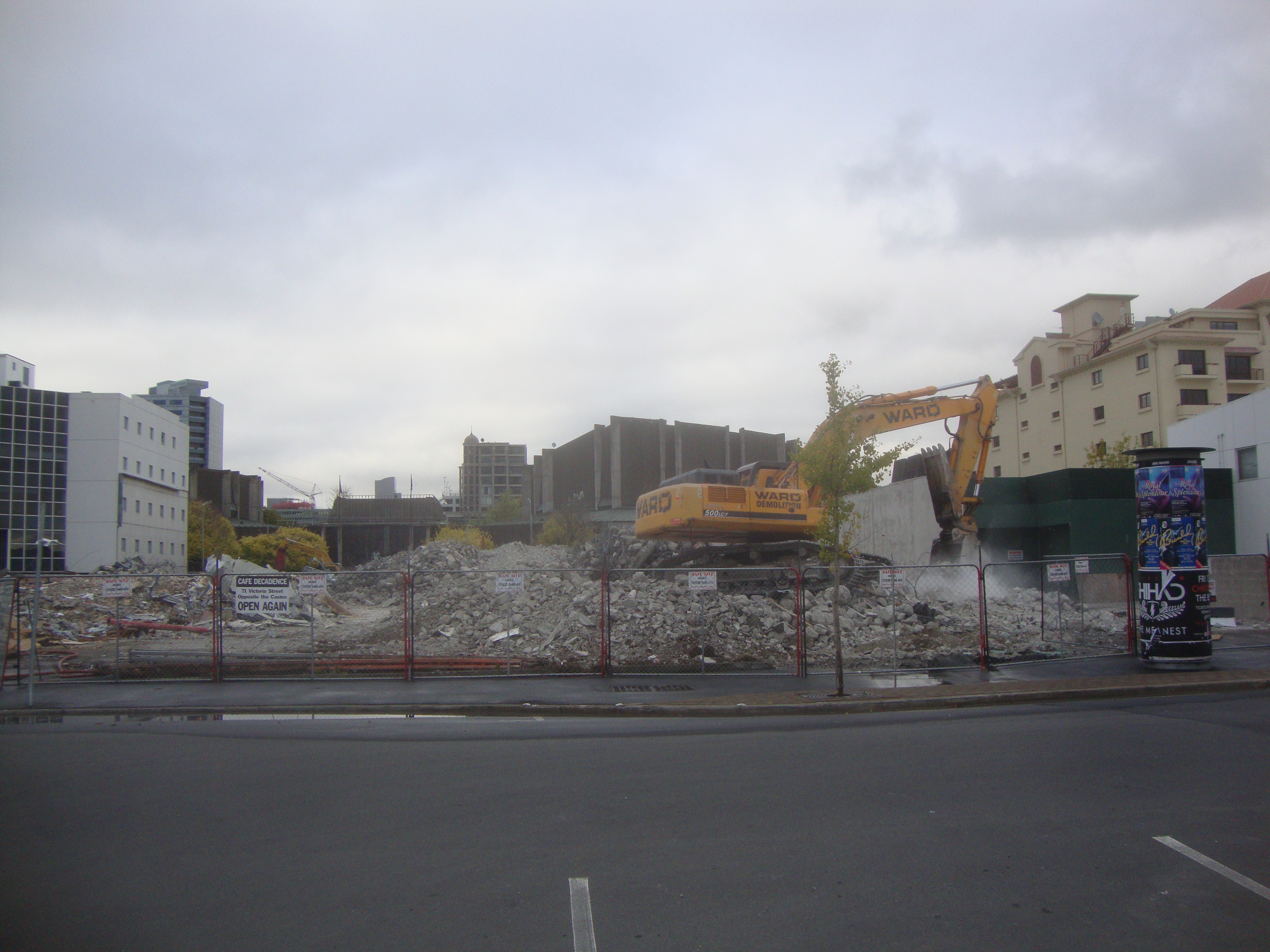
Christchurch Convention Centre after demolition in April 2012, with the Town Hall visible in the background

In August 2011, the Christchurch Convention Centre and several other public buildings were "recommended for demolition" because of extensive damage suffered in the February 2011 Christchurch earthquake and an aftershock on 13 June. The Convention Centre was demolished in March / April 2012 (see photo).
