= Christchurch City Choir =

Choir in New Zealand

- Choir
- Former name: Royal Christchurch Musical Society; Christchurch Harmonic Society
- Origin: Merged from two choirs established 1858 and 1863
- Founded: 1990; 35 years ago
- Music director: John Linker
- Headquarters: Christchurch, New Zealand
- Concert hall: Christchurch Town Hall
- Affiliation: New Zealand Choral Federation
- Associated groups: Christchurch Symphony Orchestra
- Website: www.citychoir.co.nz
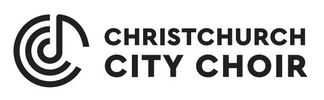

The Christchurch City Choir is a choir and charitable incorporated society in Christchurch, New Zealand. The choir was re-established in 1990 as a merger of the Royal Christchurch Musical Society and the Christchurch Harmonic Society, two long-standing choirs in the city.

== History ==
In 1858, the Christchurch Harmonic Society was established to facilitate instruction for local singers and instrumentalists. Not long after, the Christchurch Musical Society was formed and gave its first concert in 1863, attaining its "Royal" title in 1920.
