= Lubomír Havlák =

Czech opera singer (1921–2014)

- Born: December 27, 1921
- Died: September 28, 2014 (aged 92)

Lubomír Havlák (27 December 1921 – 28 September 2014) was a Czech dramatic tenor born at Fryčovice near Ostrava, former Czechoslovakia.

His professional career started at the theatre in Ostrava (Hunter in Rusalka), followed by performances in the Ústí nad Labem opera theater (Turridu in Cavalleria Rusticana), Bratislava and Košice (Pedro in Tiefland).

He was member of The National Theatre in Prague since 1954 till 1990.

His most remarkable engagement outside Czechoslovakia was in 1960s in Berlin Opera House (Florestan).

He died in September 2014 at the age of 92.
