= Marta Beňačková =

Slovak opera singer and music educator

Marta Beňačková (born 29 August 1953, in Bratislava) is a Slovak mezzo-soprano who has had an active performing career since the 1970s in concerts, operas, and recitals.

== Biography ==
Beňačková attended the Bratislava Conservatory where she earned a degree in piano performance. She pursued further studies in singing at the Slovakia: Academy of Music and Dramatic Arts (VŠMU). She began her career as a member of the ancient music ensemble Musica Aeterna. She left the group to pursue a solo career, and has since performed in a wide array of works from the concert repertoire that encompasses symphonic, oratorio and vocal pieces from the 17th through the 21st centuries. She has appeared in concert with the Czech Philharmonic Orchestra, Prague Symphony, Czech National Symphony Orchestra, Prague Radio Symphony Orchestra, and the Slovak Philharmonic Orchestra among other ensembles.

On the opera stage, Beňačková has particularly excelled in portraying roles in operas by Verdi and Puccini. She has sung a number of roles with the Prague State Opera, including Ulrica in Verdi's Un ballo in maschera with conductor Martin Turnovský and the title role in Antonio Vivaldi's Orlando Furioso. She has also appeared several times at the National Theatre in Prague, portraying roles like the Countess in The Queen of Spades and the Witch in Dvořák‘s Rusalka.

Beňačková is currently on the music faculty at the Bratislava Conservatory. She is not related to the famous soprano Gabriela Beňačková.

== Sources ==
- Bio of Marta Beňačková at bach-cantatas.com
