= List of compositions by Antonín Dvořák =

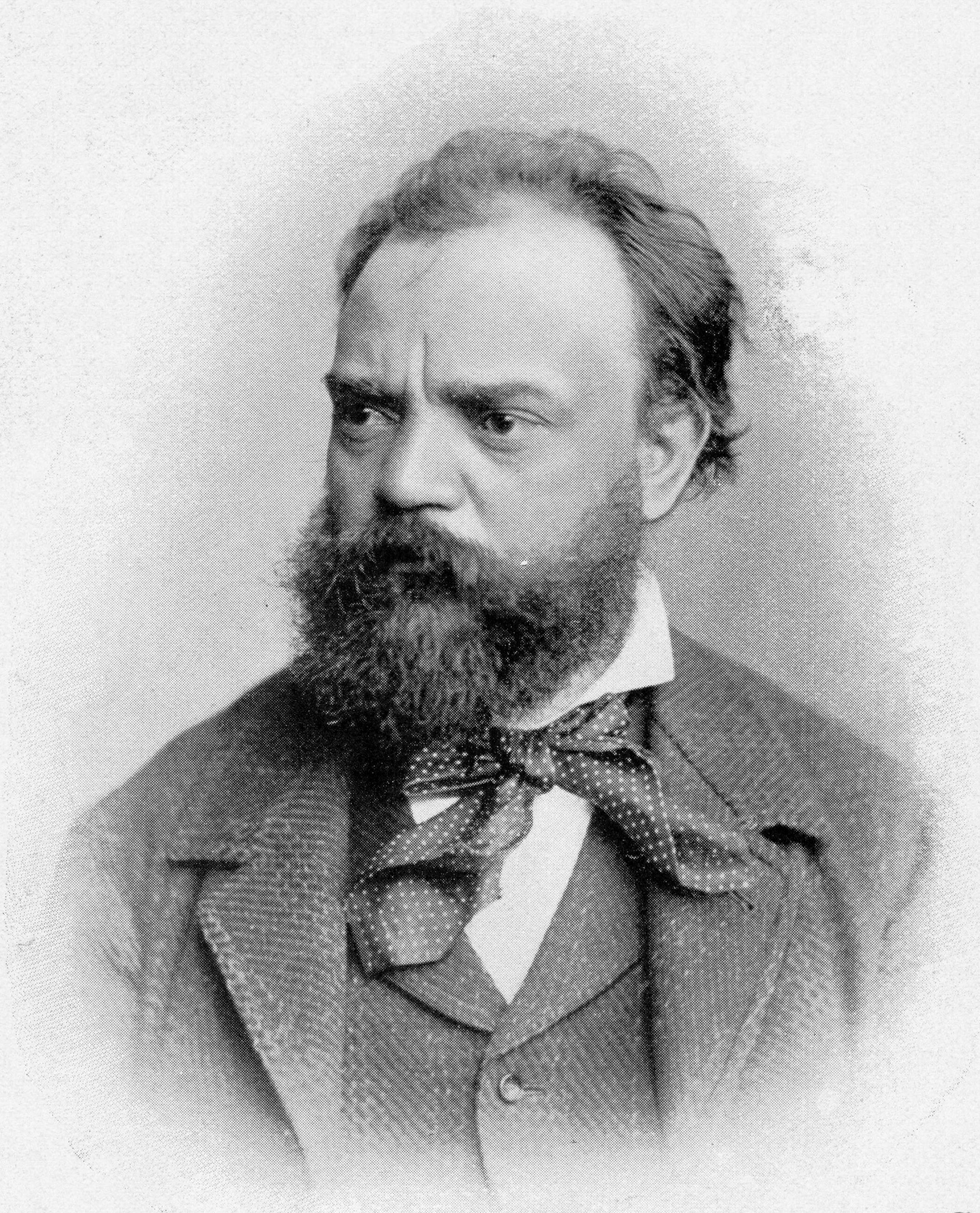
Antonín Dvořák in 1882

This list of compositions by Antonín Dvořák includes works sortable by Jarmil Burghauser catalogue number (B.), opus number (when applicable), date of composition, titles, and genre.

== List ==
B.	Op.	Date	Czech title (original title)	English title	Scoring	Remarks / recordings
1	–	1854	Polka pomněnka C dur	Forget-me-not Polka in C major	Piano	
2	–	1857-58	Mše B dur	Mass in B♭ major		lost
2bis	–	1859	Polka per pedes	Per Pedes Polka	Piano	
3	–	1860	Polka E dur	Polka in E major	Piano	
4	–	1862?	Harfenice	The Woman Harpist	Orchestra	lost; polka
5	–	1861	Polka	Polka	Orchestra	lost
6	–	1861	Galop	Gallop	Orchestra	lost
7	1	1861	Smyčcový kvintet č. 1 a moll	String Quintet No. 1 in A minor	2 Violins, 2 Violas and Cello	
8	2	1862	Smyčcový kvartet č. 1 A dur	String Quartet No. 1 in A major	2 Violins, Viola and Cello	
9	-	1865	Symfonie č. 1 c moll „Zlonické zvony“	Symphony No. 1 in C minor "The Bells of Zlonice"	Orchestra	
10	–	1865	Koncert pro violoncello a orchestr A dur	Cello Concerto in A major	Cello and Orchestra	orchestrated by Jarmil Burghauser
11	–	1865	Cypřiše	Cypresses	Voice and Piano	18 songs on poems by Gustav Pfleger Moravský; selections revised in 1881–82, B. 123 and in 1888, B. 160; selections arranged for string quartet in 1887, B. 152
12	4	1865	Symfonie č. 2 B dur	Symphony No. 2 in B♭ major	Orchestra	
13	–	1865	Dvě písně pro baryton a klavír	2 Songs	Baritone and Piano	
14	–	1865–69	Kvintet pro klarinet a smyčce b moll	Clarinet Quintet in B♭ minor	Clarinet, 2 Violins, Viola and Cello	lost
15	–	1867	Sedm meziaktních skladeb	7 Interludes	orchestra	
15bis	–	1867	Serenáda	Serenade	flute, violin, viola and triangle	
16	–	1870	Alfred	Alfred		heroic opera in 3 acts; libretto by Carl Theodor Körner
16a	–	1870	Tragická (Dramatická) ouvertura b moll	Tragic (Dramatic) Overture in B♭ minor	orchestra	overture to the opera B. 16, Alfred
17	–	1869	Smyčcový kvartet č. 2 B dur	String Quartet No. 2 in B♭ major	2 violins, viola and cello	Dvorak thought he had destroyed the score
18	–	1869	Smyčcový kvartet č. 3 D dur	String Quartet No. 3 in D major	2 violins, viola and cello	Dvorak thought he had destroyed the score
19	–	1870	Smyčcový kvartet č. 4 e moll	String Quartet No. 4 in E minor	2 violins, viola and cello	Dvorak thought he had destroyed the score
20	–	1871	Violoncellová sonáta f moll	Cello Sonata in F minor	cello and piano	lost
21	14	1871	Král a uhlíř	King and Charcoal Burner		comic opera in 3 acts; libretto by Bernard J. Lobeský; 1st version; formerly Op. 12
21a	14/0	1871	Koncertní ouvertura F dur	Concert Overture in F major	orchestra	overture to the opera B. 21, King and Charcoal Burner [1]
22	–	1871–73	Motivy z opery „Král a uhlíř“ [1]	Potpourri on King and Charcoal Burner [1]	piano	
23	9A	1871	Písně na slova Elišky Krásnohorské	Songs on Words by Eliška Krásnohorská	voice and piano	5 songs; nos. 2 and 4 published as nos. 1 and 2 in Op. 9
24	5A/1	1871	Sirotek	The Orphan	voice and piano	song after a ballad by Karel Jaromír Erben
24bis	5A/2	1871	Rozmarýna	Rosmarine	voice and piano	song after a poem by Karel Jaromír Erben
25	–	1871–72	Klavírní trio	Piano Trio	violin, cello and piano	lost; formerly Op. 13/1
26	–	1871–72	Klavírní trio	Piano Trio	violin, cello and piano	lost; formerly Op. 13/2
27	30	1872	Dědicové bilé hory	The Heirs of the White Mountain	chorus and orchestra	secular cantata after a poem by Vítězslav Hálek; revised in 1880, B. 102 and in 1883, B. 134; formerly Op. 4
28	5	1872	Klavírní kvintet č. 1 A dur	Piano Quintet No. 1 in A major	2 violins, viola, cello and piano	
29	6	1872	Čtyři písně na slova srbské lidové poezie	4 Songs on Serbian Folk Poems	voice and piano	
30	7	1872	Písně z rukopisu „Královédvorského“	Songs from the "Dvůr Králové" Manuscript ("Queen's Court")	voice and piano	6 songs
31	–	1872	Tři nokturna: 2. Májová noc	3 Nocturnes: 2. May Night	orchestra	others lost; nocturne B. 47 may be one of these
32	8	1872	Silhouetty	Silhouettes	piano	12 pieces; revised in 1879, B. 98
33	–	1873	Houslová sonáta a moll	Violin Sonata in A minor	violin and piano	lost
34	10	1873	Symfonie č. 3 Es dur	Symphony No. 3 in E♭ major	orchestra	
35	–	1873	Romeo a Julia, předehra	Romeo and Juliet Overture	orchestra	lost
36	–	1873	Oktet (Serenáda)	Octet (Serenade)	clarinet, bassoon, horn, 2 violins, viola, double bass and piano	lost
37	9	1873	Smyčcový kvartet č. 5 f moll	String Quartet No. 5 in F minor	2 violins, viola and cello	
38	11a	1873	Romance f moll pro housle a klavír	Romance in F minor	violin and piano	orchestrated in 1873, B. 39
39	11	1873	Romance f moll pro housle a orchestr	Romance in F minor	violin and orchestra	orchestration of B. 38
40	12	1873	Smyčcový kvartet č. 6 a moll	String Quartet No. 6 in A minor	2 violins, viola and cello	
40a	–	1873	Andante appassionato f dur	Andante appassionato in F major	2 violins, viola and cello	
41	13	1874	Symfonie č. 4 d moll	Symphony No. 4 in D minor	orchestra	
42	14	1874	Král a uhlíř	King and Charcoal Burner		comic opera in 3 acts; libretto by Bernard J. Lobeský; 2nd version; revised in 1887, B. 151
43	–	1874–75	Motivy z opery „Král a uhlíř“ [2]	Potpourri on King and Charcoal Burner [2]	piano	
44	14A	1874	Symfonická báseň (Rapsodie) a moll	Symphonic Poem (Rhapsody) in A minor	orchestra	symphonic poem
45	16	1874	Smyčcový kvartet č. 7 a moll	String Quartet No. 7 in A minor	2 violins, viola and cello	
46	17	1874	Tvrdé palice	The Stubborn Lovers		comic opera in 1 act; libretto by Josef Štolba
47	40	1875	Nokturno H dur pro smyčce	Nocturne in B major	string orchestra	arranged for violin and piano in 1883, B. 48a and for piano 4-hands in 1883, B. 48b
48a	40	1883	Nokturno H dur pro housle a klavír	Nocturne in B major	violin and piano	arrangement of B. 47
48b	40	1882	Nokturno H dur	Nocturne in B major	piano 4-hands	arrangement of B. 47
49	77	1875	Smyčcový kvintet č. 2 G dur	String Quintet No. 2 in G major	2 violins, viola, cello and double bass	formerly Op. 18
50	20	1875	Moravské dvojzpěvy	Moravian Duets	soprano (or alto), tenor and piano	4 duets
51	21	1875	Klavírní trio č. 1 B dur	Piano Trio No. 1 in B♭ major	violin, cello and piano	
52	22	1875	Smyčcová serenáda E dur	Serenade for Strings in E major	string orchestra	
53	23	1875	Klavírní kvartet č. 1 D dur	Piano Quartet No. 1 in D major	violin, viola, cello and piano	
54	76	1875	Symfonie č. 5 F dur	Symphony No. 5 in F major	orchestra	formerly Op. 24
55	25	1875	Vanda	Vanda		tragic opera in 5 acts; libretto by František Zákrejs
56	26	1876	Klavírní trio č. 2 g moll	Piano Trio No. 2 in G minor	violin, cello and piano	
57	80	1876	Smyčcový kvartet č. 8 E dur	String Quartet No. 8 in E major	2 violins, viola and cello	formerly Op. 27
58	28	1876	Dva menuety	2 Minuets in A♭ and F major	piano	
59	29	1876	Čtyři sbory pro smíšené hlasy	4 Choruses	mixed chorus	4 choruses after poems by Adolf Heyduk and folk songs compiled by František Sušil
60	32	1876	Moravské dvojzpěvy	Moravian Duets	soprano, alto and piano	5 duets; nos. 2 and 3 arranged for female chorus in 1880, B. 107; formerly Op. 29
61a	3A	1876	Večerní písně	Evening Songs	voice and piano	6 songs after poems by Vítězslav Hálek; nos. 5-6 originally published in Op. 9; see Op. 31
61b	31	1876	Večerní písně	Evening Songs	voice and piano	6 songs after poems by Vítězslav Hálek
62	32	1876	Moravské dvojzpěvy	Moravian Duets	soprano, alto and piano	9 duets; nos. 7, 10 and 13 arranged for female chorus in 1880, B. 107
63	33	1876	Koncert pro klavír a orchestr g moll	Piano Concerto in G minor	piano and orchestra	
64	35	1876	Dumka d moll	Dumka in D minor	piano	
65	36	1876	Tema con variazioni	Theme and Variations in A♭ major	piano	
66	–	1877	Sborové písně pro mužské hlasy	Choral Songs	male chorus	3 choruses after poems by Adolf Heyduk and folk songs compiled by František Sušil
67	37	1877	Šelma sedlák	The Cunning Peasant		comic opera in 2 acts; libretto by Josef Otakar Veselý
67a	37/0	1877	Šelma sedlák, předehra k opeře A dur	Overture to The Cunning Peasant in A major	orchestra	overture to the opera B. 67
68	19b/1	1877	Ave Maria	Ave Maria	alto or baritone and organ	
69	38	1877	Moravské dvojzpěvy	Moravian Duets	soprano, alto and piano	4 duets
70	78	1877	Symfonické variace z písně „Já jsem huslař“	Symphonic Variations in C major	orchestra	
71	58	1876–77	Stabat Mater	Stabat Mater	soprano, alto, tenor, bass, chorus and orchestra	oratorio in 1 part after the Latin hymn attributed to Jacopone da Todi: I. nos. 1-10
72	41A	1877	Kytice z českých národních písní	Bouquet of Czech Folksongs	male chorus	4 choruses after Czech and Moravian folk songs
73	–	1877	Píseň Čecha	Song of a Czech	male chorus	chorus after a poem by František Jaroslav Vacek Kamenický
74	41	1877	Skotské tance	Scottish Dances in D minor	piano	
75	34	1877	Smyčcový kvartet č. 9 d moll	String Quartet No. 9 in D minor	2 violins, viola and cello	dedicated to Johannes Brahms
76	43	1877–78	Z kytice národních písní slovanských	From a Bouquet of Slavonic Folksongs	male chorus and piano	3 choruses after Slovak folk songs; arranged for piano 4-hands by Josef Zubatý
77	44	1878	Serenáda pro dechové nástroje d moll	Serenade for Wind Instruments in D minor	2 oboes, 2 clarinets, 2 bassoons, contrabassoon, 3 horns, cello and double bass	
78	46	1878	Slovanské tance 1. řada	Slavonic Dances, Series I	piano 4-hands	8 pieces; orchestrated in 1878, B. 83; no. 2 arranged for violin and piano in 1891, B. 170; nos. 3 and 8 arranged for cello and piano in 1891, B. 172
79	47	1878	Maličkosti	Bagatelles in G minor	2 violins, cello and harmonium or piano	
80	48	1878	Smyčcový sextet A dur	String Sextet in A major	2 violins, 2 violas and 2 cellos	
81	24	1878	Capriccio pro housle a klavír	Capriccio in C major	violin and piano	
82	19b/2	1878	Hymnus k Nejsvětější Trojici	Hymnus ad laudes in festo Sanctae Trinitatis	alto or baritone and organ	
83	46	1878	Slovanské tance 1. řada	Slavonic Dances, Series I	orchestra	orchestration of B. 78
84a	–	1878	Tři novořecké básně	3 Modern Greek Songs	voice and orchestra	lost; see B. 84b Op. 50
84b	50	1878	Tři novořecké básně	3 Modern Greek Songs	voice and piano	
85	42	1878	Dva furianty	2 Furiants in D and F major	piano	
86	45	1878	Slovanské rapsodie: 1. D dur 2. g moll 3. As dur	3 Slavonic Rhapsodies: 1. D major 2. G minor 3. A♭ major	orchestra	
87	27	1878	Pět sborů pro mužské hlasy	5 Choruses	male chorus	5 choruses after Lithuanian folk songs translated by František Ladislav Čelakovský
88	54A	1879	Slavnostní pochod	Festival March in C major	orchestra	
89	49	1879	Mazurek pro housle a klavír	Mazurka in E minor	violin and piano	orchestrated in 1879, B. 90
90	49	1879	Mazurek e moll pro housle a orchestr	Mazurka in E minor	violin and orchestra	orchestration of B. 89
91	79a	1879	Žalm č. 149	Psalm 149	male chorus and orchestra	sacred cantata after the biblical text; arranged for mixed chorus in 1887, B. 154
92	51	1878–79	Smyčcový kvartet č. 10 Es dur „Slovanský“	String Quartet No. 10 in E♭ major "Slavonic"	2 violins, viola and cello	
93	39	1879	Česká suita D dur	Czech Suite in D major	orchestra	
94	–	1879	Polonéza A dur pro violoncello a klavír	Polonaise in A major	cello and piano	
95a	19b/3	1879	Ave maris stella	Ave maris stella	alto or baritone and organ	
95b	19a	1879	O sanctissima dulcis virgo Maria!	O sanctissima dulcis virgo Maria!	alto, baritone and organ	arranged for soprano, alto and organ in 1890, B. 95b bis
95b bis	19a/1	1890	O sanctissima dulcis virgo Maria!	O sanctissima dulcis virgo Maria!	soprano, alto and organ	arrangement of B. 95b
96	53	1879	Koncert pro housle a orchestr a moll	Violin Concerto in A minor	violin and orchestra	first version of B. 108
97	25/0	1879	Vanda, koncertní ouvertura g moll	Vanda, Concert Overture in G minor	orchestra	overture to the opera B. 55, Vanda
98	8	1879	Dvanáct silhouett	12 Silhouettes	piano	revision of B. 32
99	–	1879	Pražské valčíky	Prague Waltzes in D major	orchestra	
100	–	1879	Polonéza Es dur	Polonaise in E♭ major	orchestra	
101	54	1879–80	Osm valčíků	8 Waltzes	piano	8 pieces; nos. 1 and 4 arranged for string quartet in 1880, B. 105; orchestrated by Jarmil Burghauser
102	30	1880	Dědicové bílé hory	The Heirs of the White Mountain	chorus and orchestra	secular cantata after a poem by Vítězslav Hálek; 1st revision of B. 27
103	56A	1880	Čtyři eklogy	4 Eclogues	piano	4 pieces; no. 1 used as no. 5 in Op. 56
104	55	1880	Cigánské melodie	Gypsy Songs	voice and piano	7 songs after poems by Adolf Heyduk; includes "Songs My Mother Taught Me"
105	54/1,4	1880	Dva valčíky	2 Waltzes in A and D major	2 violins, viola and cello	arrangement of B. 101 nos. 1 and 4
106	57	1880	Sonata F dur pro housle a klavír	Sonata in F major	violin and piano	
107	32/7,10, 13,2,3	1880	Moravské dvojzpěvy	Moravian Duets	female chorus	arrangement of B. 62 and 60 nos. 7, 10, 13, 2 and 3
108	53	1880	Koncert pro housle a orchestr a moll	Violin Concerto in A minor	violin and orchestra	final version of B. 96; revised 1882
109	–	1880	Čtyři lístky do památníku	4 Album Leaves	piano	4 pieces
110	52	1880	Šest klavírních skladeb	6 Piano Pieces	piano	6 pieces
111	56	1880	Šest mazurek	6 Mazurkas	piano	6 pieces
112	60	1880	Symfonie č. 6 D dur	Symphony No. 6 in D major	orchestra	
113	–	1880	Dětská píseň	Children's Song	2 voices unaccompanied	
114	53A/1	1880	Polka pro orchestr „Pražským akademikům“	Polka "For Prague Students" in B♭ major	orchestra	
115	14/I/7	1881	Balada Krále Matyáše	Ballad of King Matthias		ballad to the opera B. 42, King and Charcoal Burner [2]
116	–	1881	Moderato A dur	Moderato in A major	piano	
117	59	1881	Legendy	Legends	piano 4-hands	10 pieces; orchestrated in 1881, B. 122
118	–	1881	Na tej našej střeše ...	There on Our Roof ...	soprano, alto and piano	duet after Moravian folk song
119	53A/2	1881	Kvapík E dur	Gallop in E major	orchestra	
120	–	1881	Kvartetní věta F dur	Quartet Movement in F major	2 violins, viola and cello	
121	61	1881	Smyčcový kvartet č. 11 C dur	String Quartet No. 11 in C major	2 violins, viola and cello	
122	59	1881	Legendy	Legends	orchestra	orchestration of B. 117
123	2A	1881–82	Šest písní na slova Gustava Pflegra Moravského	6 (Love) Songs on Poems by Gustav Pfleger Moravský	voice and piano	revision of B. 11 nos. 1, 5, 9, 8, 13 and 11 from Cypresses; revised again in 1881–82, B.124
124	2A	1881–82	Čtyři písně na slova Gustava Pflegra Moravského	4 (Love) Songs on Poems by Gustav Pfleger Moravský	voice and piano	revision of B. 123 nos. 1, 5, 11 and 13 from Cypresses; see Op. 83; 4 songs nos. 1-4
125	62	1881–82	Josef Kajetán Tyl	Josef Kajetán Tyl	orchestra	incidental music for the play by František Ferdinand Šamberk
125a	62/0	1882	Domov můj C dur, předehra ke hře Josef Kajetán Tyl	My Home in C major	orchestra	overture to the play Josef Kajetán Tyl, B. 125
126	63	1882	V přírodě	In Nature's Realm	mixed chorus	5 choruses after poems by Vítězslav Hálek
127	64	1881–82	Dimitrij	Dimitrij		tragic opera in 4 acts (historical); libretto by Marie Červinková-Riegrová; 1st version of B. 186
127a	64/0	1882	Dimitrij, předehra k opeře es moll	Overture to Dimitrij in E-flat minor	orchestra	overture to the opera B. 127
128	3A/2,3	1882	Dvě večerní písně	2 Evening Songs	voice and orchestra	arrangement of B. 61a, Evening Songs, nos. 2 and 3; see Op. 31
128bis	–	1882	Otázka	Question in G minor	piano	
129	–	1883	Impromptu d moll	Impromptu in D minor	piano	
130	65	1883	Klavírní trio č. 3 f moll	Piano Trio No. 3 in F minor	violin, cello and piano	
131	66	1883	Scherzo capriccioso	Scherzo capriccioso in D♭ major	orchestra	
132	67	1883	Husitská c moll, dramatická ouvertura	Hussite Overture in C minor	orchestra	concert overture; arranged for piano 4-hands in 1883, B. 511
133	68	1883-84	Ze Šumavy	From the Bohemian Forest	piano 4-hands	6 pieces; no. 5 arranged for cello and piano in 1891, B. 173; orchestrated by Henk de Vlieger
134	30	1884	Dědicové bílé hory	The Heirs of the White Mountain	chorus and orchestra	secular cantata after a poem by Vítězslav Hálek; 2nd revision of B. 27
135	69	1884	Svatební košile	The Spectre's Bride	soprano, tenor, bass, chorus and orchestra	oratorio in 1 part, dramatic cantata, after a ballad by Karel Jaromír Erben: I. nos. 1-18
136	12A/1	1884	Dumka c moll	Dumka in C minor	piano	
137	12A/2	1884	Furiant g moll	Furiant in G minor	piano	
138	–	1884–1892	Humoreska Fis dur	Humoresque in F♯ major	piano	
139	15	1884	Balada d moll pro housle a klavír	Ballade in D minor	violin and piano	others lost; given as no. 1
140	–	1884	Kačena divoká	The Wild Duck	voice and piano	lost; folk song
141	70	1884–85	Symfonie č. 7 d moll	Symphony No. 7 in D minor	orchestra	
142	–	1885	Dvě písně	2 Czech Folk Poems	voice and piano	
143	28A	1885	Hymna českého rolnictva	Hymn of the Czech Peasants	chorus and orchestra	secular cantata after a text by Karel Pippich
144	71	1885–86	Svatá Ludmila	Saint Ludmila	soprano, alto, 2 tenors, bass, chorus and orchestra	oratorio in 3 parts after a text by Jaroslav Vrchlický: I. nos. 1-17; II. nos. 18-35; III. nos. 36-45 arranged as opera in 1901, B. 205
145	72	1886	Slovanské tance 2. řada	Slavonic Dances, Series II	piano 4-hands	8 pieces; orchestrated in 1887, B. 147
146	73	1886	V národním tónu	In Folk Tone	voice and piano	4 songs after Slovak and Czech folksongs
147	72	1887	Slovanské tance 2. řada	Slavonic Dances, Series II	orchestra	orchestration of B. 145
148	74	1887	Terceto C dur	Terzetto in C major	2 violins and viola	
149	75a	1887	Drobnosti	Miniatures in G minor	2 violins and viola	arranged for violin and piano in 1887, B. 150
150	75	1887	Romantické kusy pro housle a klavír	Romantic Pieces in G minor	violin and piano	arrangement of B. 149
151	14/III	1887	Král a uhlíř	King and Charcoal Burner		revision of B. 42, act III
152	–	1887	Cypřiše	Cypresses	2 violins, viola and cello	arrangement of B. 11 nos. 6, 3, 2, 8, 12, 7, 9, 14, 4, 16, 17 and 18; original for voice and piano
153	86a	1887	Mše D dur	Mass in D major	soprano, alto, tenor, bass, chorus and organ	orchestrated in 1892, B. 175
154	79	1887	Žalm č. 149	Psalm 149	chorus and orchestra	sacred cantata after the biblical text; arrangement of B. 91
155	81	1887	Klavírní kvintet č. 2 A dur	Piano Quintet No. 2 in A major	2 violins, viola, cello and piano	
156	–	1887	Dvě perličky	2 Little Pearls in F major and G minor	piano	
157	82	1887–88	Vier Lieder	4 Songs on Poems by O. Malybrok-Stieler	voice and piano	
158	–	1888	Lístek do památníku	Album Leaf in E♭ major	piano	
159	84	1888	Jakobín	The Jacobin		comic opera in 3 acts; libretto by Marie Červinková-Riegrová; revised in 1897, B. 200
160	83	1888	Písně milostné	Love Songs	voice and piano	revision of B. 11 nos. 8, 3, 9, 6, 17, 14, 2 and 4 from Cypresses; 8 songs nos. 1-8
161	85	1889	Poetické nálady	Poetic Tone Pictures	piano	13 pieces (tone poems)
162	87	1889	Klavírní kvartet č. 2 Es dur	Piano Quartet No. 2 in E♭ major	violin, viola, cello and piano	
163	88	1889	Symfonie č. 8 G dur	Symphony No. 8 in G major	orchestra	
164	–	1890	Gavotte	Gavotte in G minor	3 violins	
165	89	1890	Requiem	Requiem	soprano, alto, tenor, bass, chorus and orchestra	oratorio in 2 parts after the Latin funerary text: I. nos. 1-8; II. nos. 9-13
166	90	1890–91	Klavírní trio č. 4 e moll „Dumky“	Piano Trio No. 4 in E minor "Dumky"	violin, cello and piano	
167	–	1891	Fanfáry	Fanfares in C major	4 trumpets and timpani	
168	91	1891	V přírodě F dur, koncertní ouvertura	In Nature's Realm in F major	orchestra	concert overture
169	92	1891	Karneval A dur, koncertní ouvertura	Carnival in A major	orchestra	concert overture
170	46/2	1891	Slovanský tanec e moll pro housle a klavír	Slavonic Dance in E minor	violin and piano	arrangement of B. 78 no. 2
171	94	1891	Rondo g moll pro violoncello a klavír	Rondo in G minor	cello and piano	orchestrated in 1893, B. 181
172	46/3,8	1891	Slovanské tance	Slavonic Dances in A and G minor	cello and piano	arrangement of B. 78 nos. 3 and 8
173	68/5	1891	Klid	Silent Woods in D♭ major	cello and piano	arrangement of B. 133 no. 5 from Ze Šumavy, Op. 68; first published under German title Waldesruhe; orchestrated in 1893, B. 182
174	93	1892	Othello fis moll, koncertní ouvertura	Othello in F♯ minor	orchestra	concert overture
175	86	1892	Mše D dur	Mass in D major	soprano, alto, tenor, bass, chorus and orchestra	orchestration of B. 153
176	103	1892	Te Deum	Te Deum	soprano, bass, chorus and orchestra	sacred cantata after the Latin hymn attributed to Nicetas of Remesiana
177	102	1892–93	Americký prapor	The American Flag	contralto, tenor, bass, chorus and orchestra	secular cantata after a poem by Joseph Rodman Drake
178	95	1893	Symfonie č. 9 e moll „Z nového světa“	Symphony No. 9 in E minor "From the New World"	orchestra	
179	96	1893	Smyčcový kvartet č. 12 F dur „Americký“	String Quartet No. 12 in F major "American"	2 violins, viola and cello	
180	97	1893	Smyčcový kvintet č. 3 Es dur „Americký“	String Quintet No. 3 in E♭ major "American"	2 violins, 2 violas and cello	
181	94	1893	Rondo g moll pro violoncello a orchestr	Rondo in G minor	cello and orchestra	orchestration of B. 171
182	68/5	1893	Klid D♭ dur pro violoncello a orchestr	Silent Woods in D♭ major	cello and orchestra	orchestration of B. 173; no. 5 from Ze Šumavy, Op. 68
183	100	1893	Sonatina G dur pro housle a klavír	Sonatina in G major	violin and piano	
184	98	1894	Suita A dur	Suite in A major "American"	piano	orchestrated in 1895, B. 190
185	99	1894	Biblické písně	Biblical Songs	voice and piano	10 songs; nos. 1-5 orchestrated in 1895, B. 189
186	64	1894	Dimitrij	Dimitrij		tragic opera in 4 acts (historical); libretto by Marie Červinková-Riegrová; 2nd version of B. 127
187	101	1894	Humoresky	Humoresques	piano	8 pieces
188	–	1894	Dvě klavírní skladby	2 Piano Pieces in G major and G minor	piano	
189	99/1-5	1895	Biblické písně	Biblical Songs	voice and orchestra	orchestration of B. 185 nos. 1-5
190	98b	1895	Suita A dur	Suite in A major "American"	orchestra	orchestration of B. 184
191	104	1894–95	Koncert pro violoncello a orchestr h moll	Cello Concerto in B minor	cello and orchestra	
192	106	1895	Smyčcový kvartet č. 13 G dur	String Quartet No. 13 in G major	2 violins, viola and cello	
193	105	1895	Smyčcový kvartet č. 14 As dur	String Quartet No. 14 in A♭ major	2 violins, viola and cello	
194	–	1895	Ukolébavka	Lullaby	voice and piano	song after a poem by F. L. Jelínek
195	107	1896	Vodník	The Water Goblin	orchestra	symphonic poem
196	108	1896	Polednice	The Noon Witch	orchestra	symphonic poem; also known as The Noonday Witch
197	109	1896	Zlatý kolovrat	The Golden Spinning Wheel	orchestra	symphonic poem
198	110	1896	Holoubek	The Wild Dove	orchestra	symphonic poem; also known as The Wood Dove
199	111	1897	Píseň bohatýrská	A Hero's Song	orchestra	symphonic poem
200	84/III	1897	Jakobín	The Jacobin		revision of B. 159, act III
201	112	1898–99	Čert a Káča	The Devil and Kate		comic opera in 3 acts (fairy tale); libretto by Adolf Wenig
201a	112/0	1899	Čert a Káča, předehra k opeře	Overture to The Devil and Kate	orchestra	overture to the opera B. 201
202	113	1900	Slavnostní zpěv	Festival Song	chorus and orchestra	secular cantata after a poem by Jaroslav Vrchlický
203	114	1900	Rusalka	Rusalka		tragic opera in 3 acts (fairy tale); libretto by Jaroslav Kvapil
203a	114/0	1900	Rusalka, předehra k opeře	Overture to Rusalka	orchestra	overture to the opera B. 203
204	–	1901	Zpěv z Lešetínského kováře	Song of the Smith of Lešetín	voice and piano	song after a poem by Svatopluk Čech; completed by Josef Suk
205	71b	1901	Svatá Ludmila	Saint Ludmila		arrangement of oratorio B. 144
206	115	1902–03	Armida	Armida		tragic opera in 4 acts; libretto by Jaroslav Vrchlický
206a	115/0	1903	Armida, předehra k opeře	Overture to Armida	orchestra	overture to the opera B. 206
302	–	1859	Praeludien und Fugen	Preludes and Fugues	organ	8 pieces
601	–	1878	Dvě irské písně	2 Irish Songs	male chorus	arrangement of Robert Maver's songs
605	–	1894	Old Folks at Home	Old Folks at Home	soprano, bass-baritone, chorus and orchestra	arrangement of Stephen Foster's song
