= String Quartet No. 11 (Dvořák) =

1881 composition by Antonín Dvořák

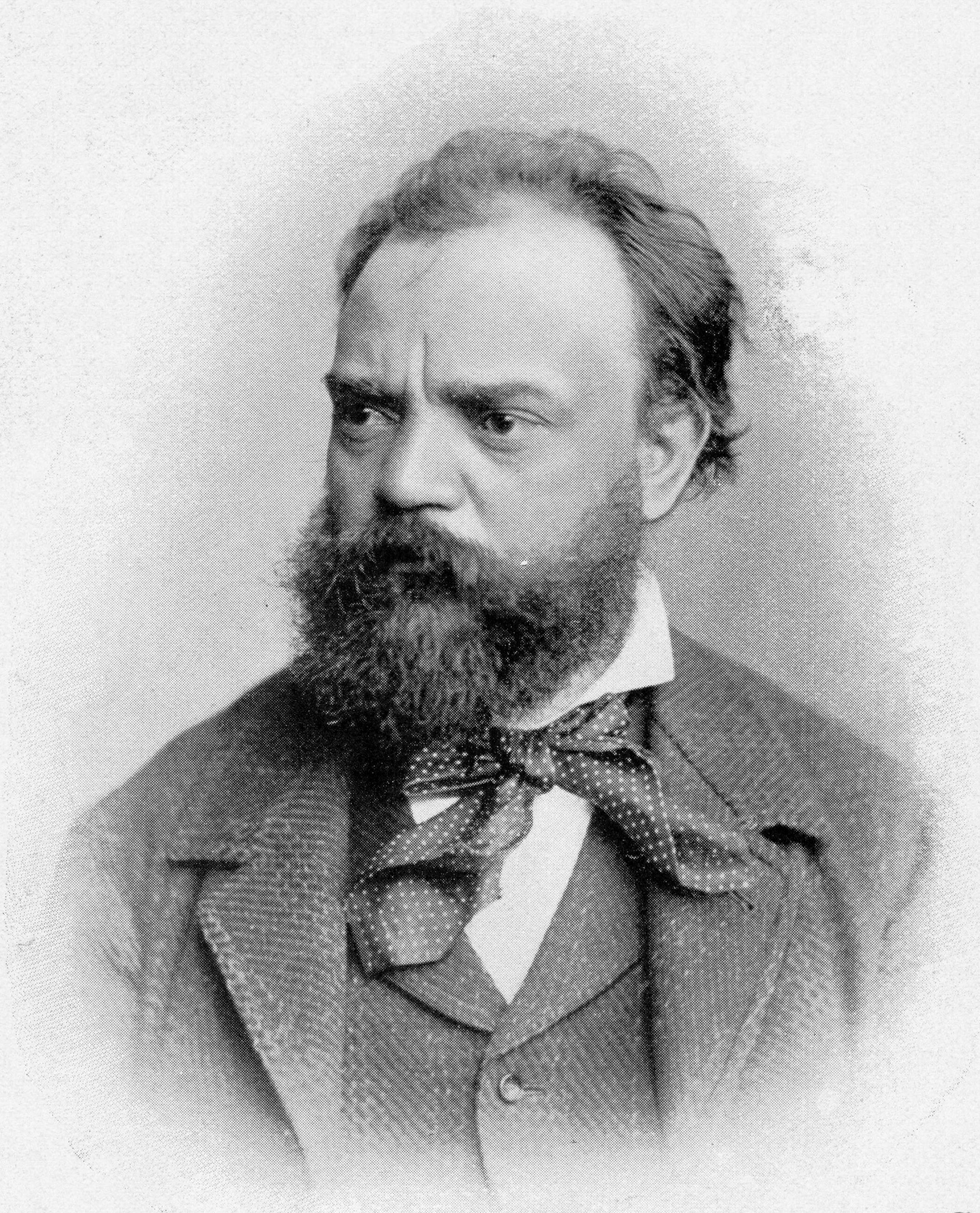
Antonín Dvořák in 1882

Antonín Dvořák composed his String Quartet No. 11 in C major, Op. 61, B. 121, between late October and early November 1881 to fulfill a commission from the Hellmesberger Quartet.

== Background ==
In October 1881, Dvořák finished the sketches for his new opera Dimitrij, when he learned in the Vienna newspapers, that the Hellmesberger Quartet is proposing the performance of his new string quartet in December 1881. He was thus forced to interrupt the work on the opera, and began to compose a quartet.

Dvořák began to compose in F major (on 7 October 1881), but he probably wasn't satisfied with that version, since later (on 25 October 1881) after completing the first movement, he decided to create an entirely new work, in C major.

The composition was supposed to premiere on 15 December 1881 in the Vienna Ringtheater, but because of the catastrophic conflagration in that building, the performance was postponed. It is not known today when the first performance occurred. The Czech première took place on 5 January 1884; the quartet was played by Ferdinand Lachner, Julius Raušer, Josef Krehan and Alois Neruda.

== Structure ==
The composition consists of four movements, and lasts around 30 minutes in performance. Two themes based on a polonaise for cello and piano, B. 94, written two years earlier, reappear in the spirited scherzo of the third movement.

1. Allegro
2. Poco adagio e molto cantabile
3. Allegro vivo
4. Finale. Vivace
