= String Quartet No. 1 (Dvořák) =

1862 composition by Antonín Dvořák

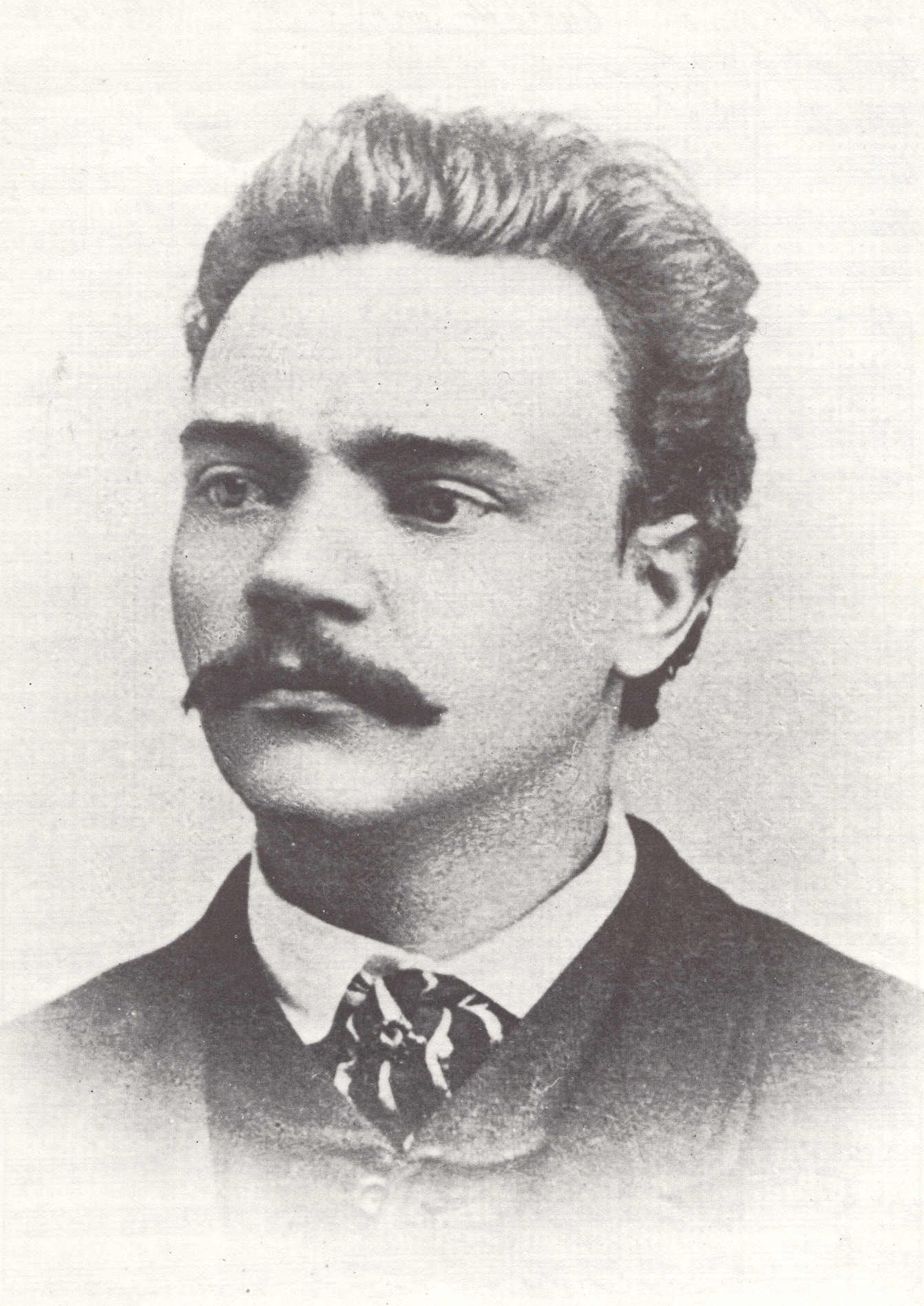
Antonín Dvořák in 1868

Antonín Dvořák finished the composition of his String Quartet No. 1 in A major, Op. 2, (B. 8), one of his earliest chamber works, in March 1862.

== Background ==
Dvořák's fourteen string quartets cover the bulk of his composing career, from 1862 (No. 1) to 1895 (No. 14). The first string quartet was not his first chamber composition: he had written the String Quintet in A minor (Op. 1) in Summer 1861.

In 1887 Dvořák decided to rework the long-forgotten quartet. He removed a good deal of what he by then considered to be unnecessary "filler" in the original version.

The composition was dedicated to the director of Prague Conservatory, Josef Krejčí, who was Dvořák's teacher of music theory at the Prague Organ School. No actual performance has been documented before 1888, when the revised version of the work was played at a concert of the Umělecká beseda (Arts Discussion Group) in the Rudolfinum in Prague. The players were members of the orchestra of the National Theatre: Karel Ondříček, Jan Pelikán, Petr Mareš and Alois Neruda.

== Structure ==
The work is composed in four movements:

1. Andante – Allegro (A major)
2. Andante affettuoso et appassionato (F♯ minor)
3. Allegro scherzando (A major)
4. Allegro animato (A major)

The approximate duration is 48 minutes.

The strongest pointer to Dvořák's future mastership is in the three-part trio section of the third movement, which is the forerunner of the many future furiants.

== Notes ==
=== Sources ===
- Melville-Mason, Graham (2005). Panocha Quartet: Chamber Works Vol. 1 (CD). Antonín Dvořák. Czech Republic: Supraphon. SU 3815-2 138.
- Šourek, Otakar. The Chamber Music of Antonín Dvořák. Translated by Roberta Finlayson Samsour. Czechoslovakia: Artia.
