= String Quartet No. 3 (Dvořák) =

String quartet in D major by Antonín Dvořák

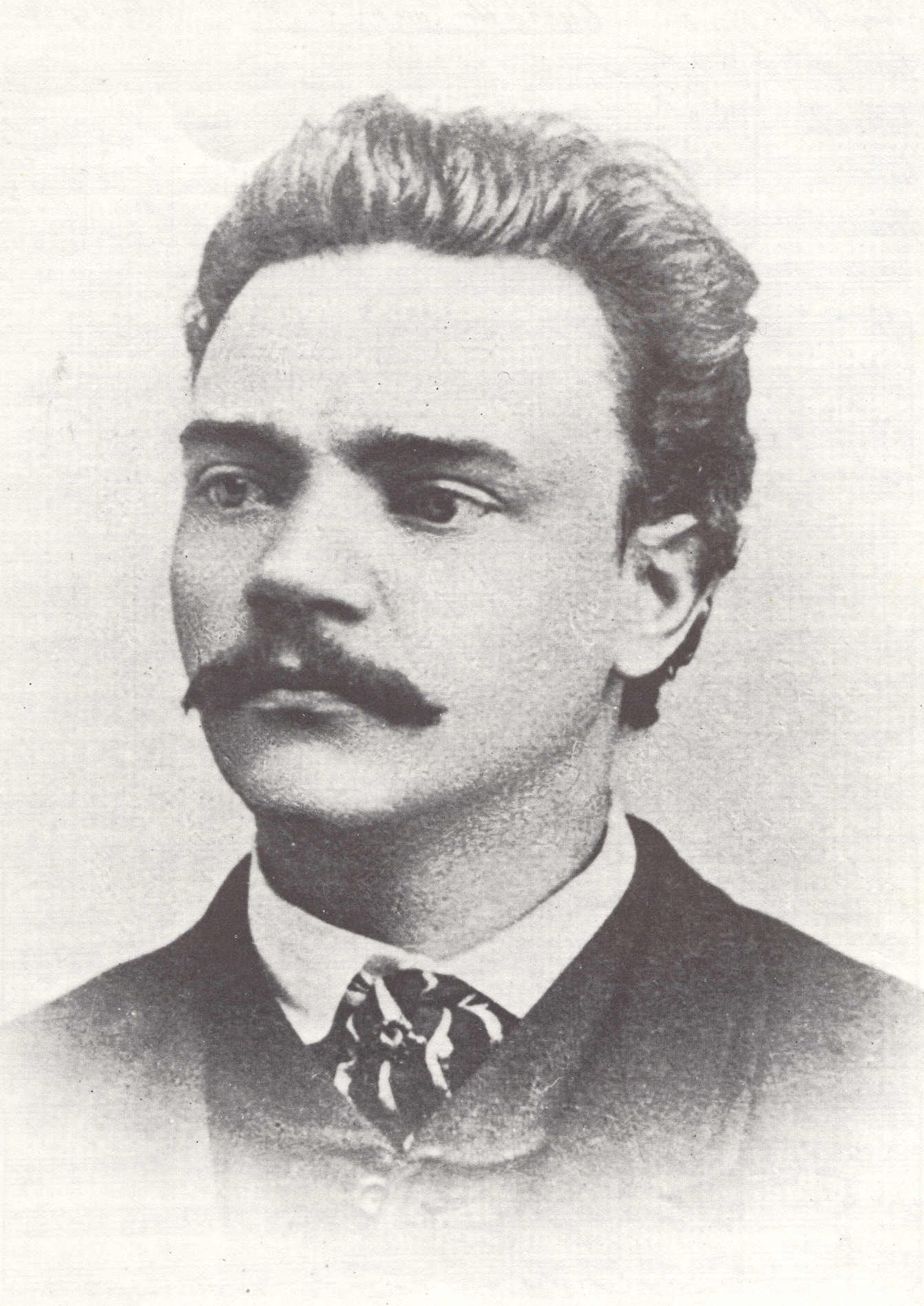
Antonín Dvořák in 1868

At over an hour's duration, Dvořák's String Quartet No. 3 in D major B. 18 is the longest of his compositions for this medium. It was written early in his career, probably at some stage in the years 1869 and 1870. In addition to its length, its style has been described in parts as Wagnerian.

== Background ==
The String Quartet No. 3 was one of three (Nos. 2, 3, and 4) which Dvořák believed he had destroyed after he had disposed of the scores, having been written early in his composing career. The exact date of this one cannot be ascertained, but all three were composed during the years 1868 to 1870, with the completion of No. 4 given as December 1870. At a later stage the separate parts for the individual players were re-discovered and these quartets rescued for posterity. This quartet appears not to have been published commercially, but it appears in the Souborné vydání díla (complete critical edition), volume 5, dated 1964.

It received its first performance by the Dvorak Quartet, at the Rudolfinum, Prague, on 12 January 1969.

== Structure ==
String Quartet No. 3 in D major, B. 18 is in four movements, as follows:

1. Allegro con brio
2. Andantino
3. Allegro energico — Trio
4. Finale: Allegretto

Typical performances take between 65 and 70 minutes.

== Recordings ==
The first recording was in 1976 by the Prague String Quartet for Deutsche Grammophon. Subsequent recordings have been made by the Stamic, Panocha, Vlach and Zemlinsky string quartets.

In the old-style numbering, the String Quartet No. 10 in E♭ major was 'No. 3'; consequently, confusion has arisen over a suggestion that the first recording of the quartet number 3 was in 1938, by the Lener (Lehner) Quartet, which was reissued on CD by Rockport Records. However, another source indicates that this recording was of the quartet now numbered 10.
