= String Quartet No. 6 (Dvořák) =

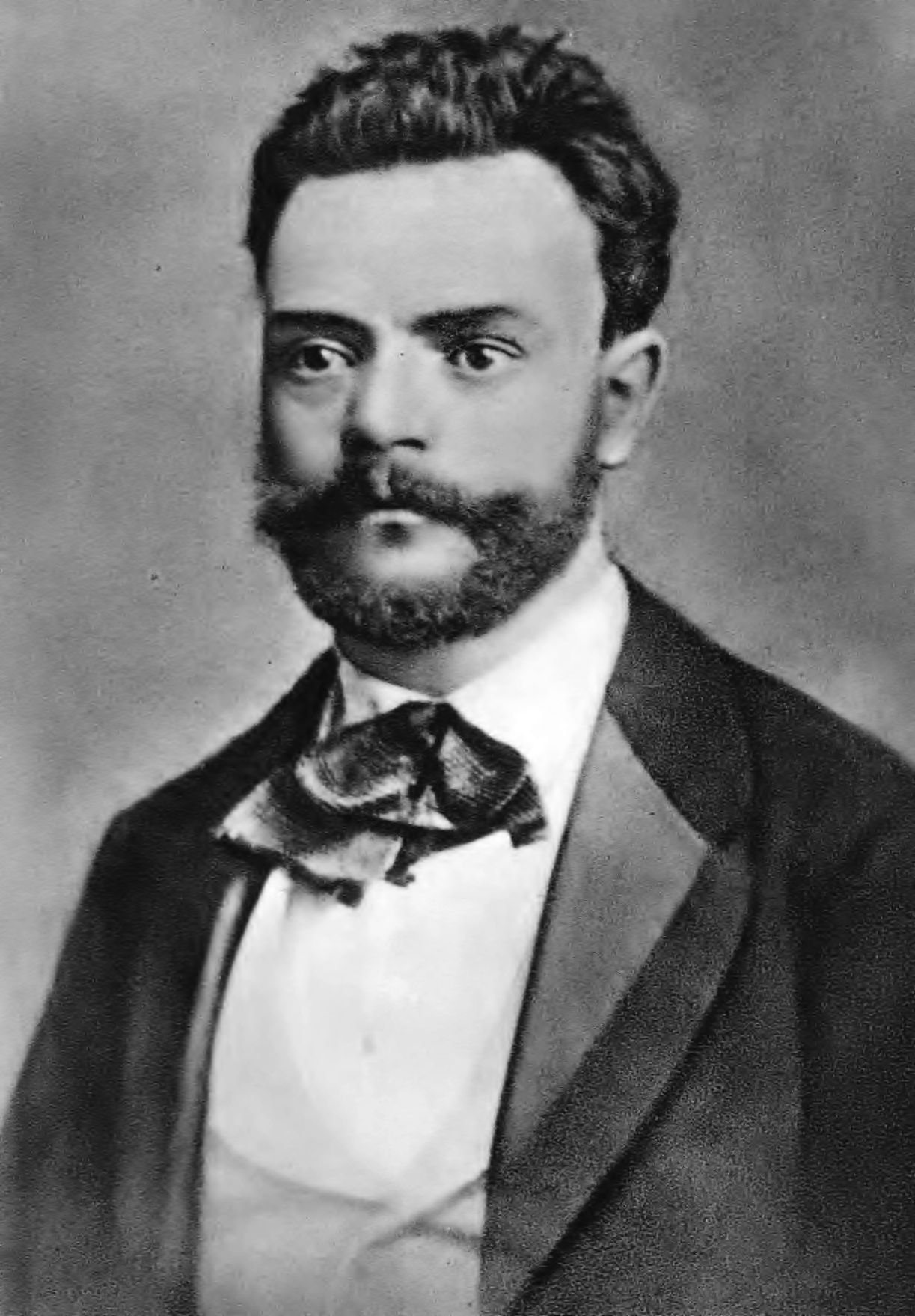
Antonín Dvořák in 1870

Antonín Dvořák composed his String Quartet No. 6 in A minor, B. 40 Op. 12, in November and December 1873, finishing it on 5 December. He later revised it, but at this stage left the work unfinished. After a reconstruction by Jarmil Burghauser, with minimal additions, a first recording was made by the Prague String Quartet, for Deutsche Grammophon, in March and April 1977.

== Background ==
The original version of Dvořák's string quartet B.40 was in one continuous movement. On revising it, probably in 1874, Dvořák began to split the music into the conventional four movements, removing one section, the Andante appassionato B. 40a, completely. He did not complete the task. For its first recording in 1977, Jarmil Burghauser found that certain passages were missing, but was able to use analogous portions from elsewhere in the piece. This process is detailed in the sleeve notes of the CD recording and summarised below. The quartet received its performance premiere on 9 October 1990, in Prague, by the Kocian Quartet.

== Structure ==
1. Allegro ma non troppo. 4/4, A minor → D major → A major
2. Poco allegro — Trio. 6/8, F major → B♭ major (the foot of the trio is marked "Scherzo D.C." even though the movement as a whole is not titled "Scherzo")
3. Poco adagio. 2/4, E major → C major → 1 bar of 3/4 → E major 2/4
4. Finale. Allegro molto. 2/4, A major → G♭ major with triplets → A major

In order to complete the work, Burghauser's editorial insertions were as follows

- Allegro ma non troppo: no recapitulation, adapted from exposition
- Second movement ("Scherzo"): first half of the opening section taken from first (rejected) version
- Finale: part of the exposition taken from the recapitulation, and in the transition from development to recapitulation "only a few bars ... were added freely".

A typical performance of the quartet takes around 32 minutes.

The quartet was printed in 1983 as part of the complete critical edition of Dvořák's works.
