= Violin Sonata (Dvořák) =

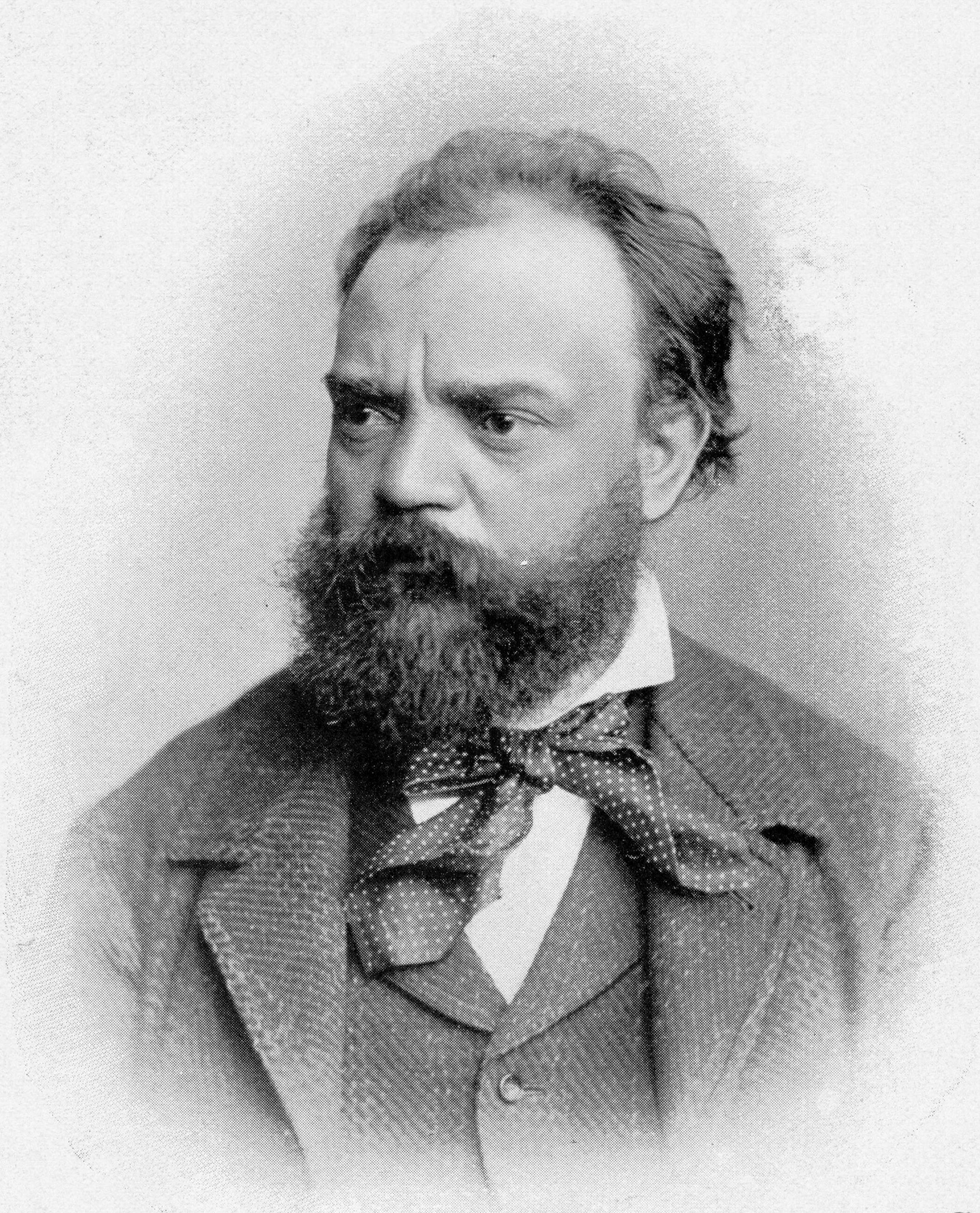
Antonín Dvořák in 1882

The Sonata for Violin and Piano in F major, Op. 57 (B. 106), is a violin sonata by Antonín Dvořák. The work was composed between 3 and 17 March 1880. At the time, Dvořák was also working on his violin concerto, and it seems that the composer explored different aspects of the violin in the two pieces. The sonata is naturally the more intimate of the two works, and appears in places to be influenced by Johannes Brahms.

Dvořák played the work on 31 March 1880 with the famous violinist Joseph Joachim, who reacted positively (a contrast to Joachim's ambivalence over aspects of the Violin Concerto). The details of the first public performance are not known, though on 5 October 1881 there was an early performance at a meeting of the Prague Umělecká Beseda. On that occasion the violinist was František Ondříček (who also premiered the violin concerto), while the piano part was taken by Karel Kovařovic, later to become a successful composer.

The sonata is in three movements:

1. Allegro ma non troppo (in F major, in sonata form with a lyrical first subject and a more Slavonic-sounding, folksy, second subject)
2. Poco sostenuto (in A major, an intimate, lyrical slow movement)
3. Allegro molto (in F major, a rondo around a striking, folk-inspired theme)

It is numbered as Op. 57; and as B. 106 in the catalogue by Jarmil Burghauser.

The manuscript is preserved in the National Museum in Prague. The first edition was published by N. Simrock in 1880, prepared under the composer's supervision.
