= String Quartet No. 7 (Dvořák) =

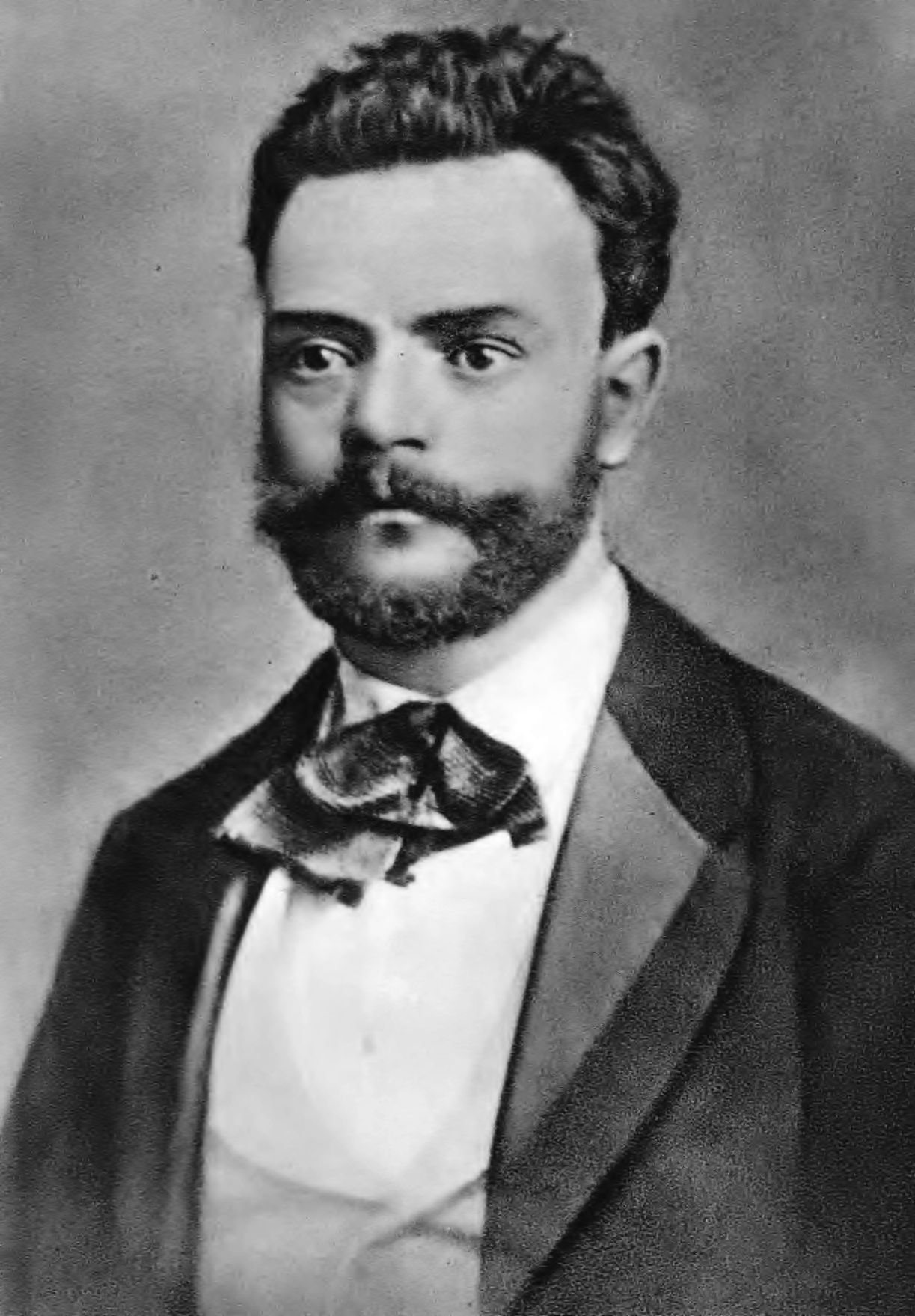
Antonín Dvořák in 1870

Antonín Dvořák finished the composition of his String Quartet No. 7 in A minor, Op. 16 (B. 45), on 24 September 1874, having probably started it on or around the 14 September.

== Background ==
According to Sourek, Dvořák began composition of this string quartet in the middle of September 1874, completing the second movement on 17 September, the third on 21 September and the fourth on 24 September. He dedicated the work to the conductor Ľudevít Procházka. It was first performed at a meeting of the "Circle of Young Musicians" on 17 June 1875, and publicly at a concert of the "Society for Chamber Music" in Prague, on 29 December 1878, the performers on this occasion being Antonin Bennewitz, Eduard Wittich, Vilem Bauer and Bruno Wilfert. The quartet was published in parts by Emanuel Stary of Prague in 1875, and in score and parts by Bote & Bock of Berlin in 1893. Its duration is around 23 1/2 minutes.

== Structure ==
The quartet is in four movements, as follows:

1. Allegro ma non troppo, A minor, 3/4
2. Andante cantabile, F major, 4/4
3. Allegro scherzando, A minor, 3/2
4. Allegro ma non troppo, A minor, 2/2
