= String Quartet No. 4 (Dvořák) =

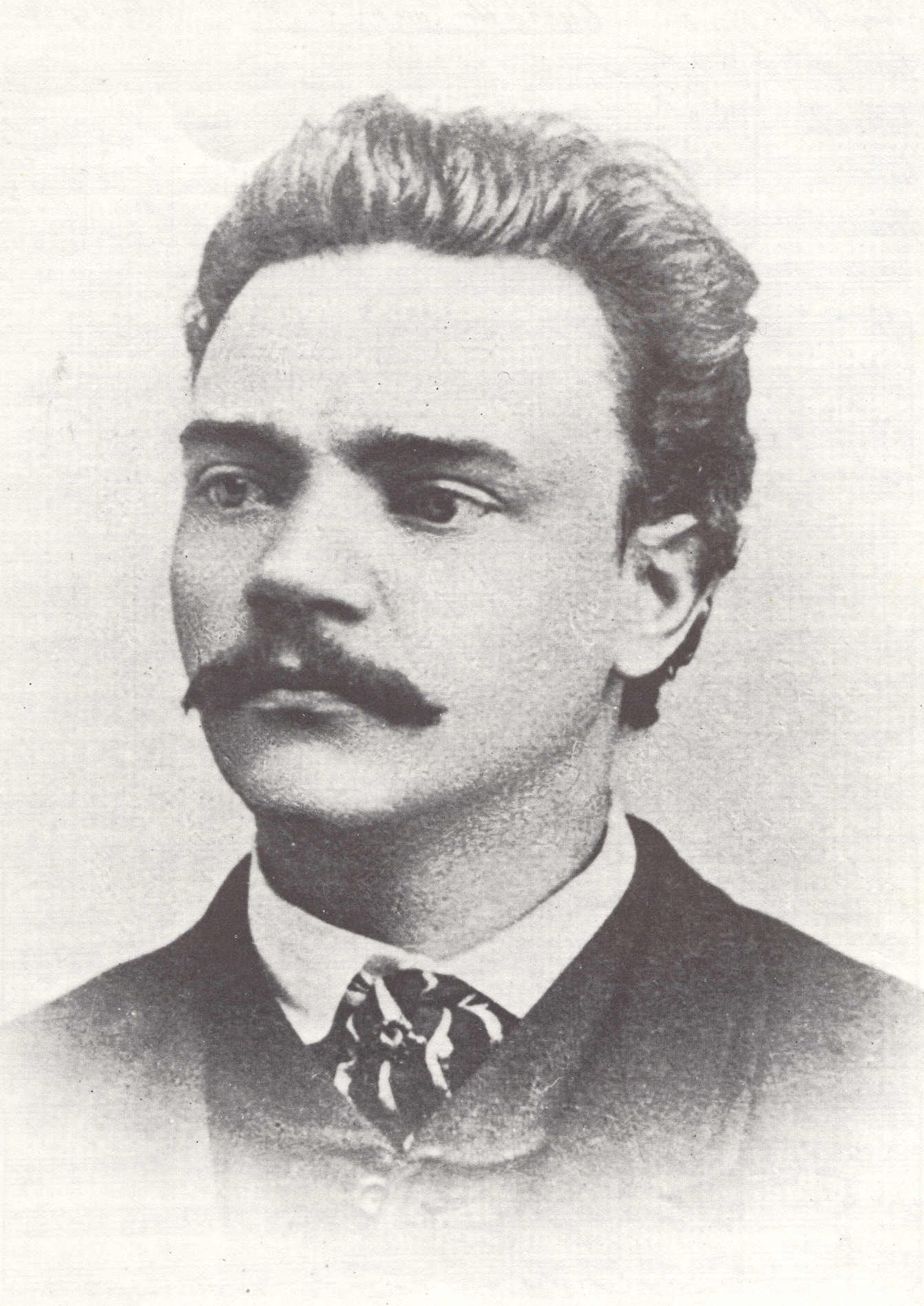
Antonín Dvořák in 1868

Antonín Dvořák composed String Quartet No. 4 in E minor, B. 19 at some stage in the years 1869 and 1870. It was one of three (together with the quartets numbers 2, and 3) which Dvořák later believed he had destroyed after he had disposed of the scores.

== Background ==
Despite Dvořák's efforts to destroy the work, copies of the individual instrumental parts in his own script were discovered at the beginning of the 20th century, allowing its reconstruction. The quartet was printed in 1968 as part of the complete critical edition of Dvořák's works, and subsequently published by Barenreiter/Supraphon Barenreiter/Supraphon in their Urtext edition. It received its first performance by the Prague Quartet, for Deutsche Grammophon, Jan/Feb 1976, and its first public performance in 1990, by the Martinu Quartet, in Prague.

== Structure ==
The quartet is in one continuous movement, but with three distinct sections.

1. Velmi pohyblivé a razné (Assai con moto ed energico)
2. Andante religioso
3. Allegro con brio (with a reprise of some of the "Andante religioso" content towards the end, prior to a fast finish)

A typical performance lasts approximately 33 minutes.

== Related works ==
The music of the second section, marked Andante religioso, was later used as the basis for a movement of the String Quintet No. 2 in G major, B. 49, which in turn was arranged for the Nocturne for Strings in B major, Op. 40 (B. 47) (also published in the composer's own arrangements for Violin and Piano, B. 48a and as a Piano Duet, B. 48b).
