= String Quartet No. 8 (Dvořák) =

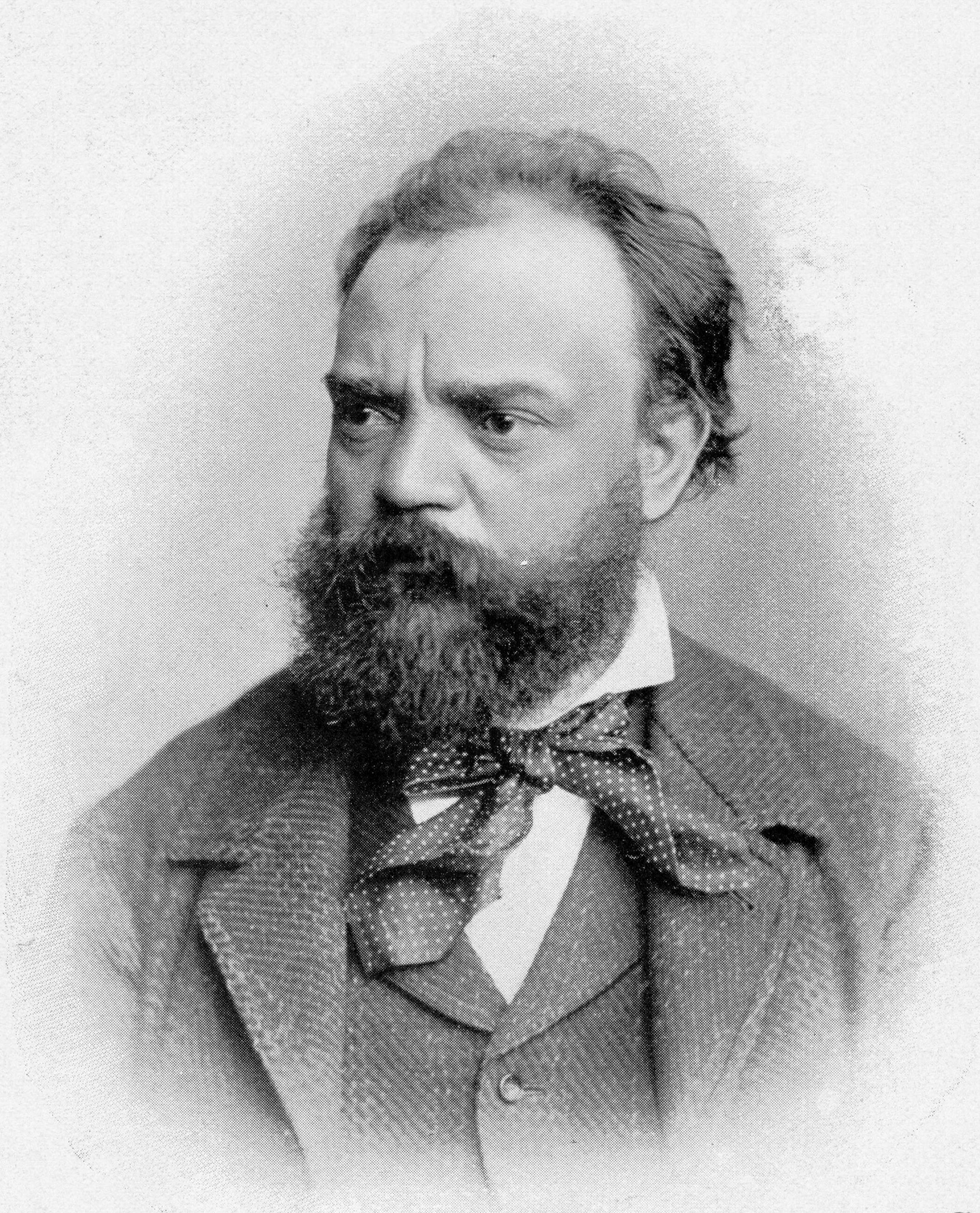
Antonín Dvořák in 1882

Antonín Dvořák's String Quartet No. 8 in E major, Op. 80 (B. 57), is a chamber composition, written between 20 January and 4 February 1876 in Prague.

The work, originally marked as Op. 27, was composed shortly after finishing the Piano Trio in G minor, Op. 26, and before the beginning of the sketchings for the Stabat Mater cantata.

The quartet was published in 1888 by Fritz Simrock in Berlin as Op. 80, although Dvořák protested. The first performance took place on 29 December 1890 at a concert of the Joachim Quartet in Berlin, played by Joachim, Hegemeister, Wirth and Diepert.

== Structure ==
The composition consists of four movements:

1. Allegro
2. Andante con moto
3. Allegro scherzando
4. Allegro con brio (Finale)

A typical performance lasts about 28 minutes.

== Commentary ==
The recent loss of Dvořák's second child is apparent in his works from this period. The quartet, like the Stabat Mater and Piano Trio No. 2, is sad and nostalgic. Although nominally in a major key, themes are often presented in a minor key. The expression of melancholy and sorrow is apparent throughout the work.

== Recordings ==
Dvořák: Chamber Works Vol. 6. CD Supraphon. 11 1456-2 131. (Panocha Quartet)
