= Bagatelles (Dvořák) =

1878 composition by Antonín Dvořák

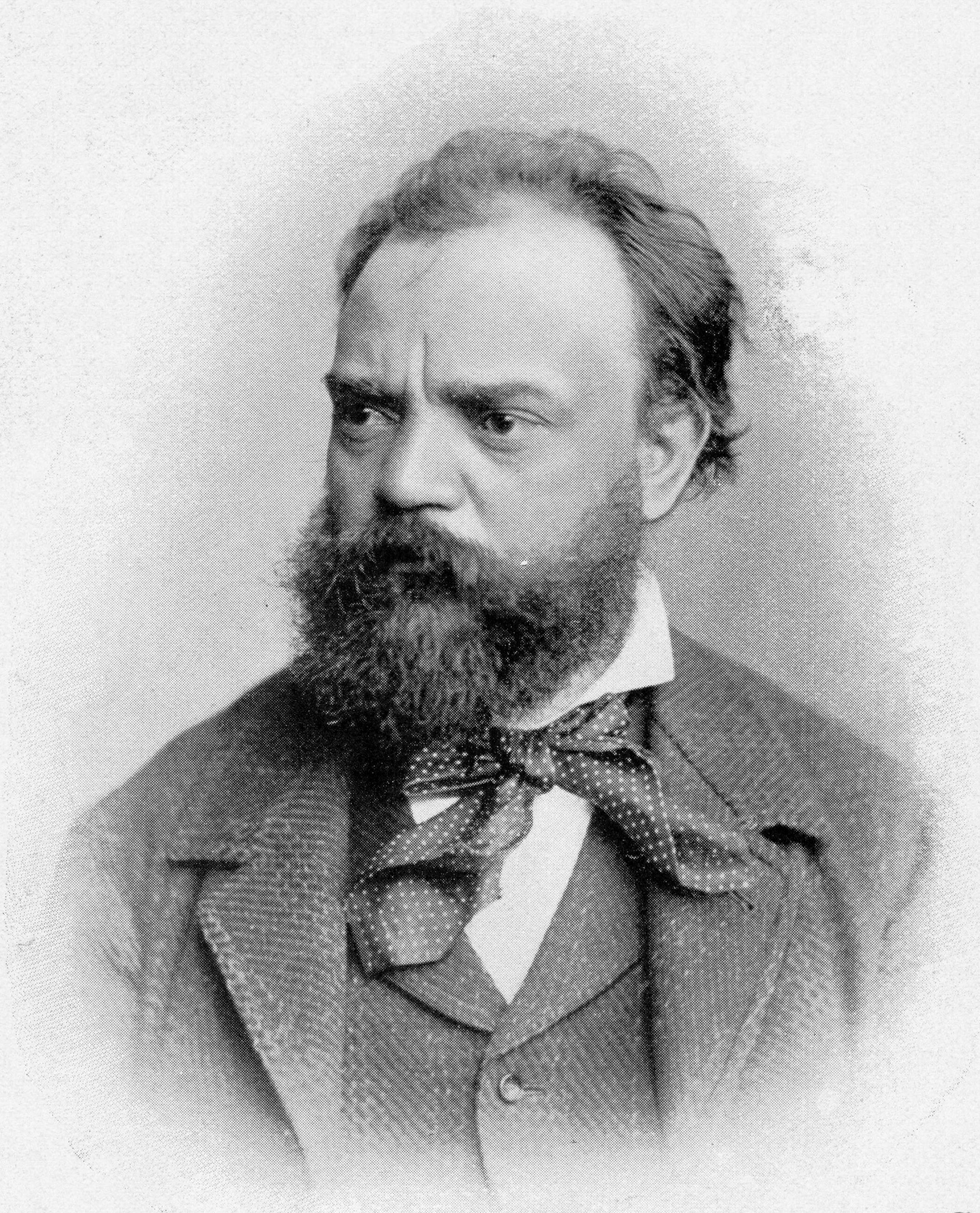
Antonín Dvořák in 1882

The Bagatelles, Op. 47 (B. 79) are five bagatelles for two violins, cello, and harmonium written by Antonín Dvořák. They were premiered in Prague on 2 February 1879 by Ferdinand Lachner, Vorel, Alois Neruda, and the composer, at the apartment of his friend, Josef Srb-Debrnov. At Srb-Debrnov's apartment there was no piano, but a harmonium, which dictated the unusual instrumentation of the work.

Arranged for a duo at the piano, Simrock published the Bagatelles in 1879. The following year Simrock published the original version.
