= Rondo for Cello and Orchestra (Dvořák) =

- by Antonín Dvořák
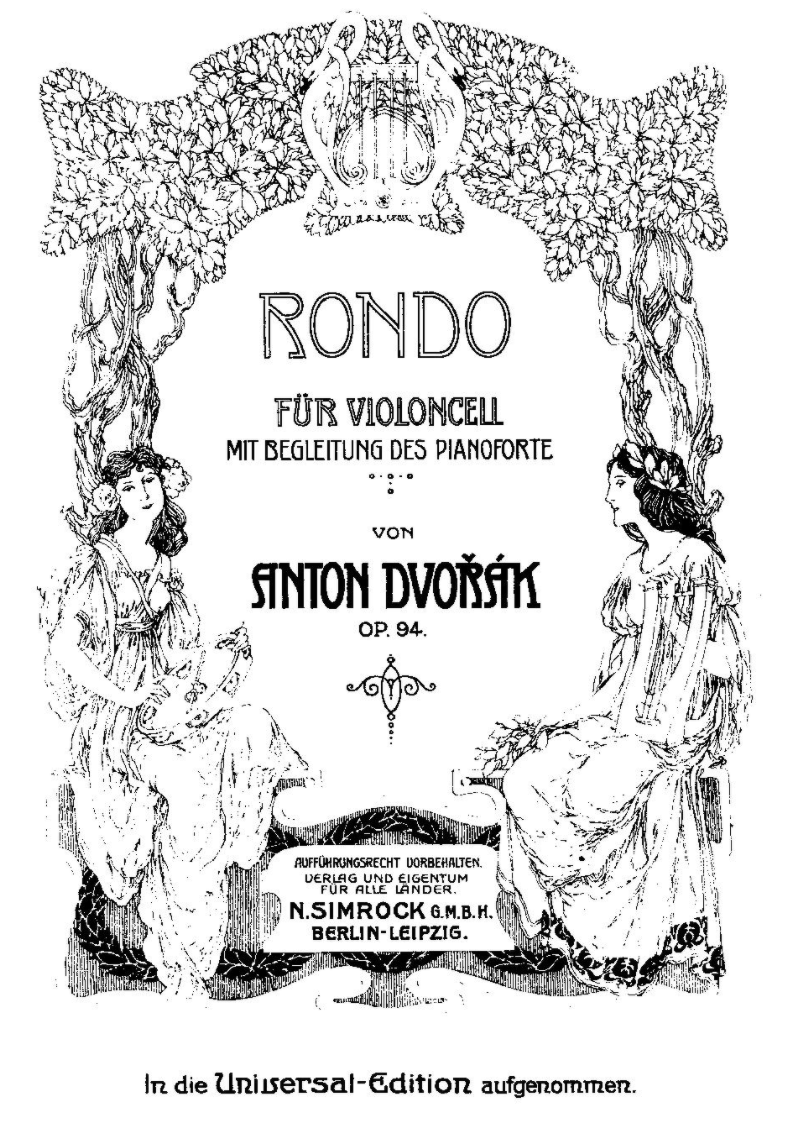
- Cover of 1894 Simrock edition
- Key: G minor
- Catalogue: B. 171 (with piano), B. 181 (with orchestra)
- Opus: 94
- Style: Romantic period
- Form: Rondo
- Composed: 1891 (with piano), 1893 (with orchestra)
- Dedication: Hanuš Wihan
- Movements: One

The Rondo for Cello and Orchestra in G minor, Op. 94, is a composition by Antonín Dvořák. Originally written for cello with piano accompaniment in 1891, it has been performed in recent years by the likes of cellists Yo-Yo Ma, Sheku Kanneh-Mason and Sol Gabetta. The Rondo's main theme is among Dvořák's moderately well-known melodies. A typical performance lasts around eight minutes.

== Background ==
In 1892, Dvořák toured Bohemia and Moravia, accompanied by violinist Ferdinand Lachner and cellist Hanuš Wihan. The three musicians would perform Dvořák's piano trios (with him at the piano), as well as solo pieces for each musician. For the tour, Dvořák wrote the Rondo in G minor, originally with piano accompaniment; the primary motivation was Wihan's need of a piece that would show off his abilities. He moreover arranged the eighth of his Slavonic Dances and Silent Woods from the cycle From the Bohemian Forest for the tour. He later wrote an arrangement of the rondo for small orchestra.

== Structure ==
The Rondo contains three themes, presented in the regular rondo form ABACABA. The Rondo's G minor key helps the main theme create a somewhat melancholy atmosphere, though it is nevertheless spirited and dance-like, like much of Dvořák's chamber music.

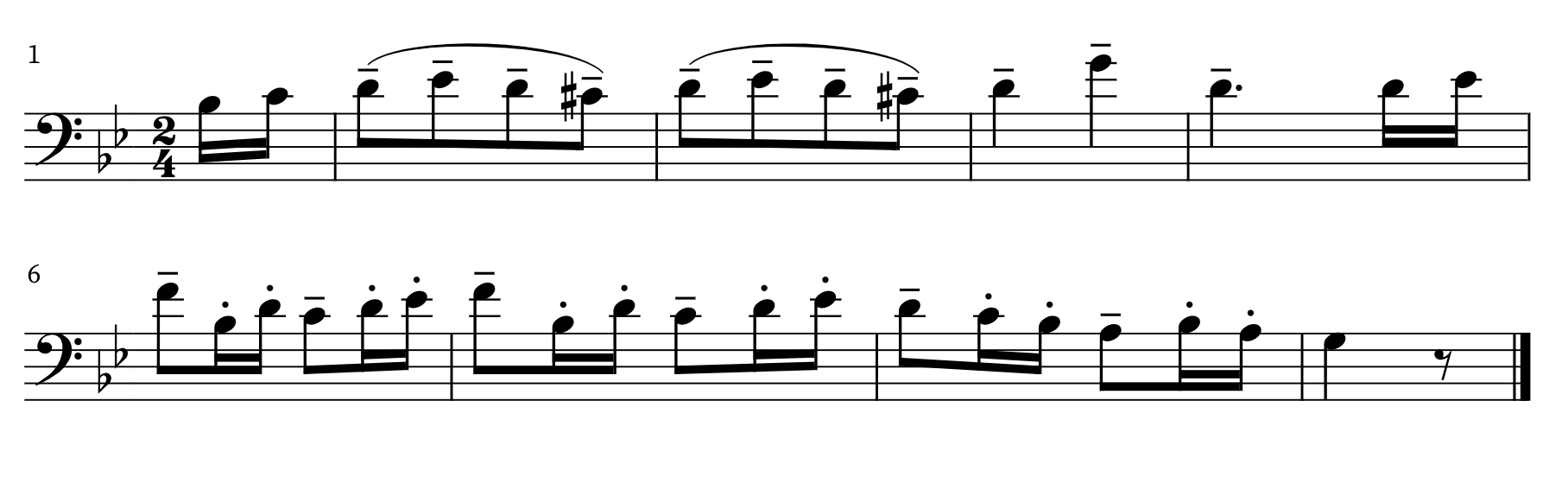
First theme

The first section is followed by a brief passage wherein the cello carries a more lyrical and upbeat melody.

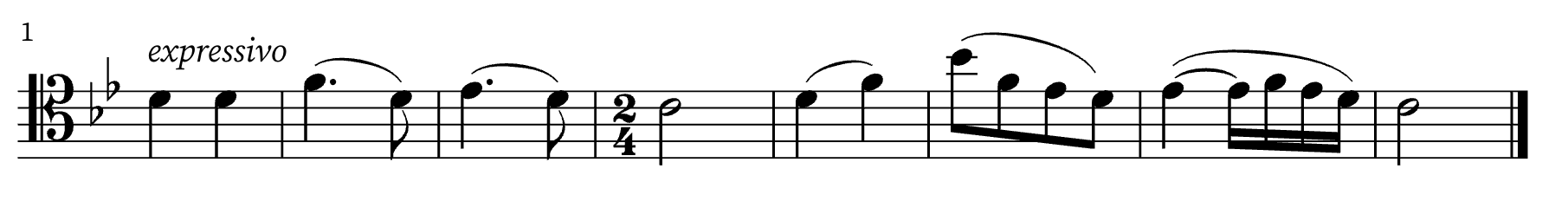
Second theme

Soon, however, the mood changes, becoming more uneasy until the final, virtuosic section. In the third section the cello soars exuberantly into its high registers.

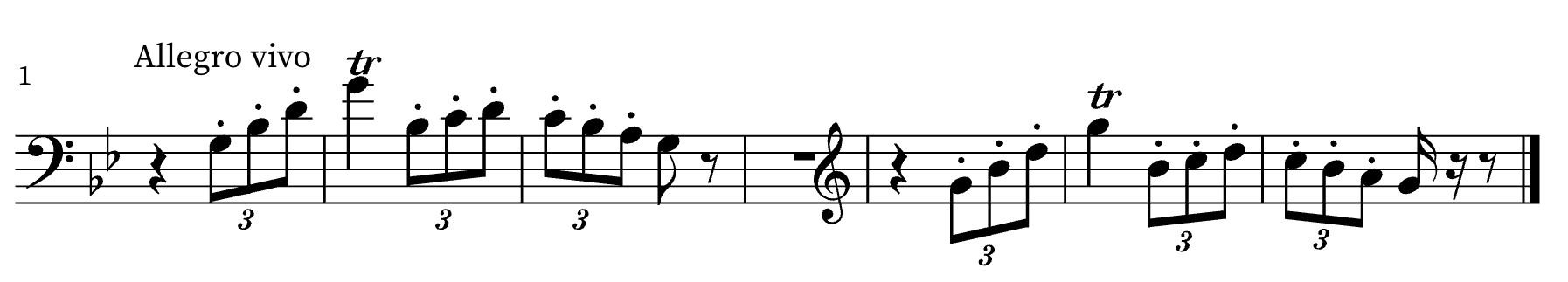
Third theme

Afterwards, the return of the lyrical section sees a final statement of the first theme, this time tinged with gloom, and the piece draws to a quiet and peaceful close.
