= String Quartet No. 2 (Dvořák) =

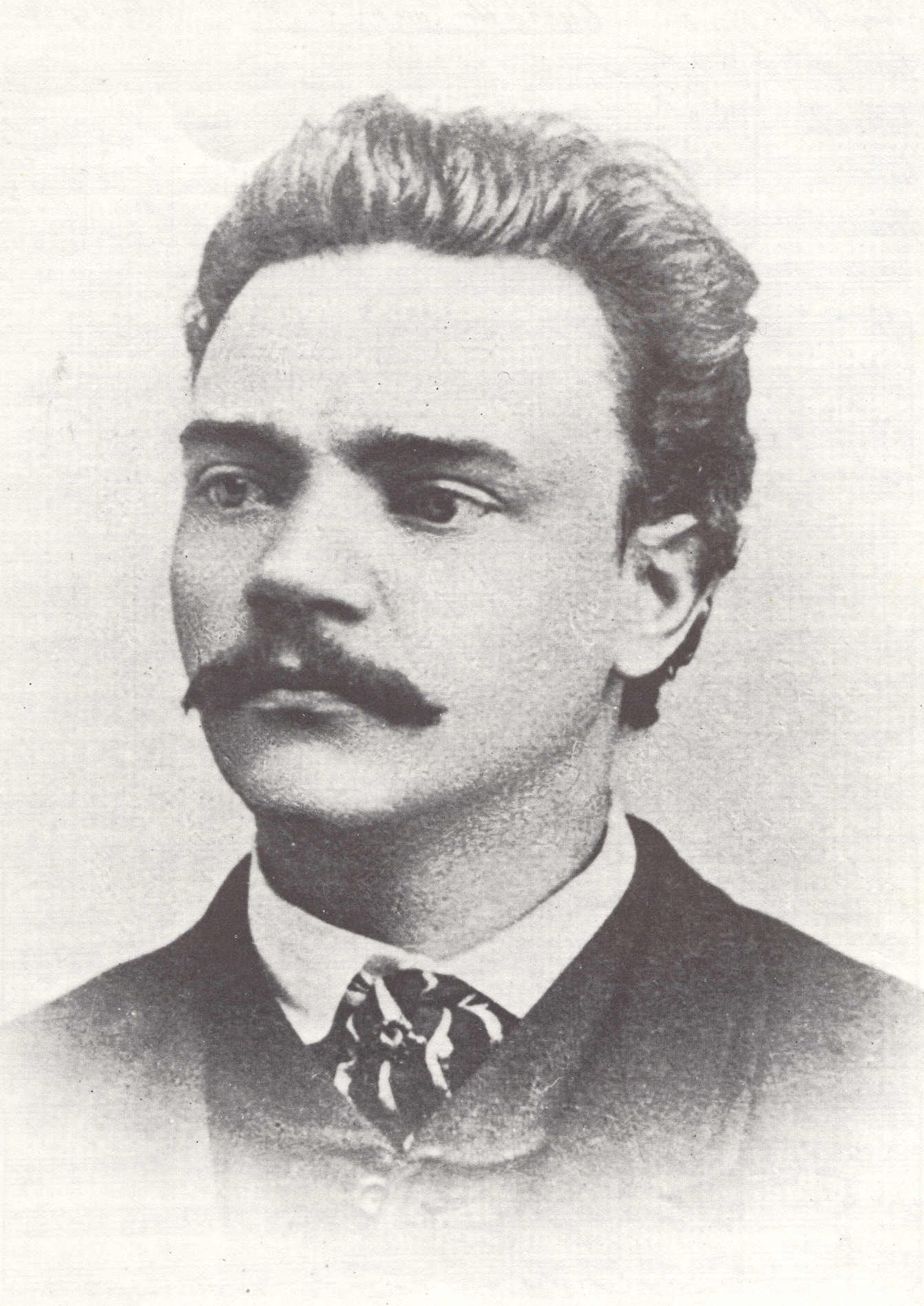
Antonín Dvořák in 1868

The String Quartet No. 2 in B♭ major, B. 17, was probably composed by Antonín Dvořák in 1869, early in his compositional career. It was one of three (together with Nos. 3, and 4) which Dvořák later believed he had destroyed after he had disposed of the scores.

== Background ==
Despite Dvořák's efforts to destroy the work, copies of the individual instrumental parts were discovered at the beginning of the 20th century, allowing its reconstruction. It received its first performance in private by the Ondricek Quartet, Prague, on 16 November 1932. It is of over 45 minutes' duration, making it Dvorak's second-longest chamber work. The parts and score were included in the Souborné vydání díla (complete critical edition), series 4, volume 5, dated 1962 and published by Barenreiter in 2014.

== Structure ==
The quartet is in four movements:

1. Allegro ma non troppo
2. Largo
3. Allegro con brio
4. Finale: Andante — Allegro giusto — Allegro con fuoco
