= Andante appassionato (Dvořák) =

Composition for string quartet by Antonín Dvořák

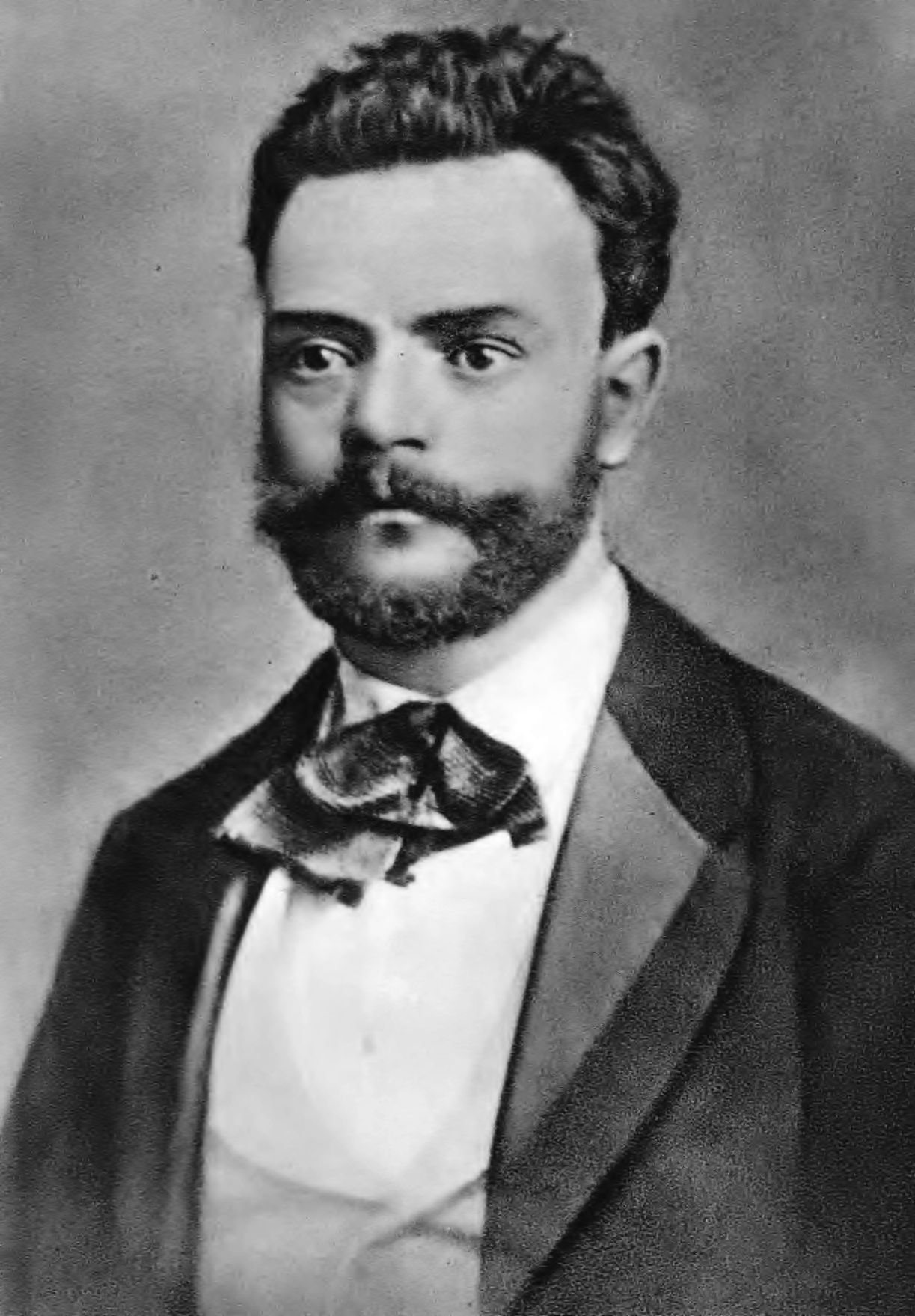
Antonín Dvořák in 1870

Antonín Dvořák's Andante appassionato for string quartet in F major (Note: NB Although antonin-dvorak.cz gives the key as A minor, and the work is drawn from the quartet No 6 in that key, the majority of the work is in F major. Herbert/ Trufitt & Burghauser give the key as F Major, as does the article List of compositions by Antonín Dvořák) B. 40a is a section of music taken from the original version of his string quartet B. 40, No. 6. With minimal editing, the Andante appassionato forms a standalone piece.

== Background ==
During November and December 1873, the original version of the string quartet No. 6, B.40, was composed. The quartet was initially fashioned in one continuous piece. On revising it, probably in 1874, Dvořák began to split the music into the conventional four movements, and set the Andante appassionato portion aside as a separate item. The last bar of the piece would originally have led into the next section of the complete quartet, and as such, according to Jarmil Burghauser, it would have modulated in key. Instead of this, for the single movement piece, Burghauser provided a suggested F major conclusion with a lengthened tonic note. This is the version recorded by the Prager Streichquartett for the Deutsche Grammophon complete set of Dvořák's string quartet works. See CD notes.

The piece has been described as "somewhat reminiscent of Schubertian Romanticism".

== Position in the original string quartet ==
The piece starts in A minor (Note: The Andante appassionato starts in A minor, 9/4 for the first 26 bars, then is notated F major 6/8 until bar 120, where 6 flats G♭ major/E♭ minor (9/4) is marked, tho' in fact the section is analogous to the opening but a semitone lower, thus making it more accurately A♭ minor; in bar 133 the written key changes to B♭ major where it stays to the end at bar 152- it ends on an F major chord (the Dominant in this key.)) and ends on a chord of F major. The start and end keys thus give it a potential place in Dvořák's String Quartet number 6 between movements 1 (which ends in A major) & 2 (which starts in F major). Some of the writing of the Andante appassionato is reminiscent of the start of the second movement of the quartet number 6, which makes the sequence 'Movement 1-Andante appassionato- Movement 2' credible in the current completed forms of the pieces. Note, however, that Burghauser describes it as originally 'leading to the [fourth movement] finale'.

== Sources ==
- Burghauser, Jarmil (1977). Notes translated by John Coombs- Dvořák: The String Quartets (429-193-2) (CD Box Set). Antonín Dvořák. Germany: Deutsche Grammophon. 429-194-2, track 5.
- Herbert, Peter J F; Trufitt, Ian T (2004). Antonin Dvořák complete catalogue of works, (The Dvořák Society occasional publications no. 4) (4th revised ed.). The Dvořák Society for Czech and Slovak Music. pp. 20–21. ISBN 0-9532769-4-5.
- Prager Streichquartett. Deutsche Grammophon CD recording of SQ No. 6 429-198-2 and Andante appassionato 429-194-2.
