= String Quartet No. 14 (Dvořák) =

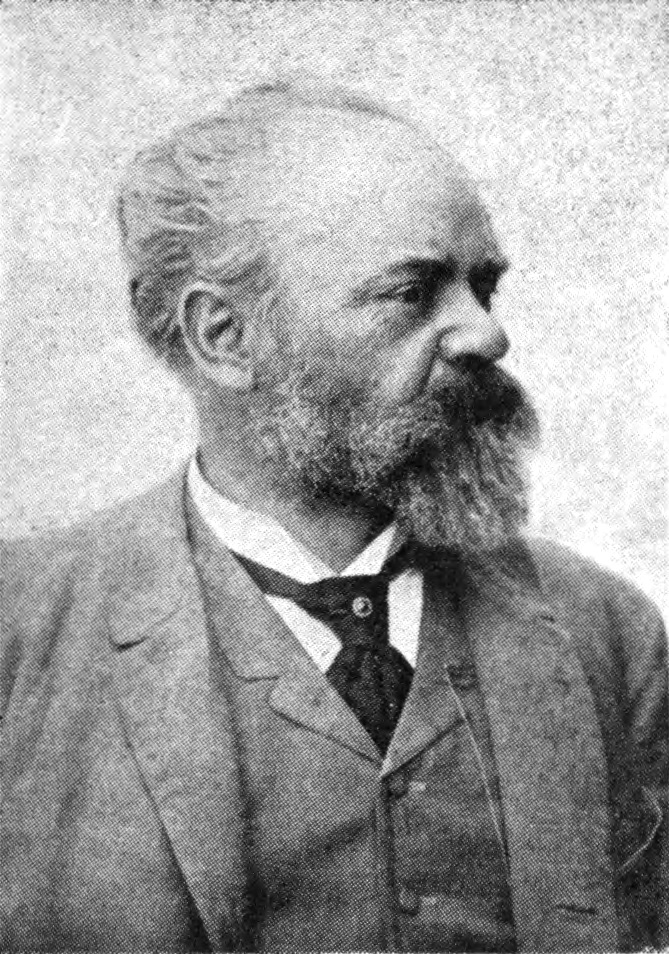
Antonín Dvořák in 1901

The String Quartet No. 14 in A♭ major, Op. 105, B. 193, was the last string quartet completed by Antonín Dvořák, even though it was published before his String Quartet No. 13 (which appeared with the higher opus number Op. 106). Dvořák finished his Fourteenth Quartet in 1895, when he had returned to Bohemia after his visit to America. The gestation of the Quartet had actually begun in America and lasted six months, which was rather protracted for the composer. This Quartet marked an important point in Dvořák's development because he would devote himself almost exclusively to writing explicit program music, namely symphonic poems and operas, afterwards.

The Quartet premiered on October 20, 1896.

== Structure ==
Lasting about 30–35 minutes, the four movements contain the following notable features:

1. Adagio ma non troppo — Allegro appassionato
  Opens with a cello solo, before the other instruments join in.
2. Molto vivace
3. Lento e molto cantabile
  The principal theme comes from a choral song composed by Dvořák on Christmas Day, 1895.
4. Allegro non tanto
  The main theme would be reprised in Dvořák's symphonic poem A Hero's Song, op. 111, B. 199, in 1897. The movement begins with some anguished phrases from the cello before evolving quickly into a joyful dance.
