= Piano Trio No. 1 (Dvořák) =

Piano trio by Antonín Dvořák

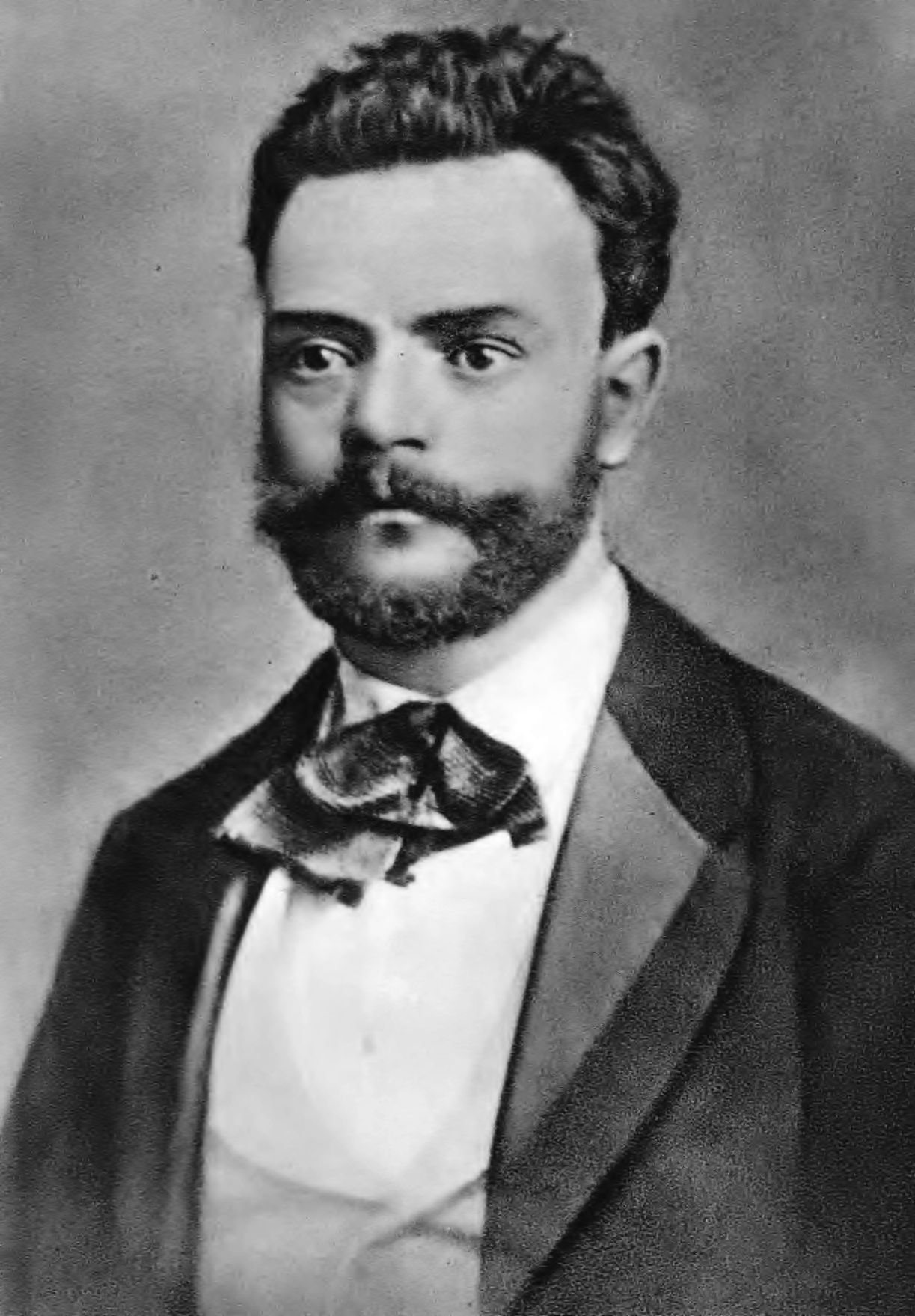
Antonín Dvořák in 1870

The Piano Trio No. 1 in B♭ major, Op. 21 (B. 51), is a piano trio by Antonín Dvořák, completed in 1875. It is the first out of the four surviving piano trios, preceded by two works from 1871 to 1872 that Dvořák destroyed (B. 25 and B. 26).

== Structure ==
The composition consists of four movements in the classical tradition:

1. Allegro molto (B♭ major)
2. Adagio molto e mesto (G minor)
3. Allegretto scherzando (E♭ major) — Trio (B major)
4. Finale. Allegro vivace (B♭ major)

Performance can vary from 31 to 37 minutes.

== History ==
The piano trio was written in the spring of 1875; the autograph dates the completion date to 14 May 1875. The premiere was held on 17 February 1877 at a concert in Prague.

- Suk Trio (2001, recorded 1977): Dvořák: Complete Piano Trios, Supraphon 3545.
