= Cypresses (Dvořák; quartet version) =

String quartet arrangements by Antonín Dvořák

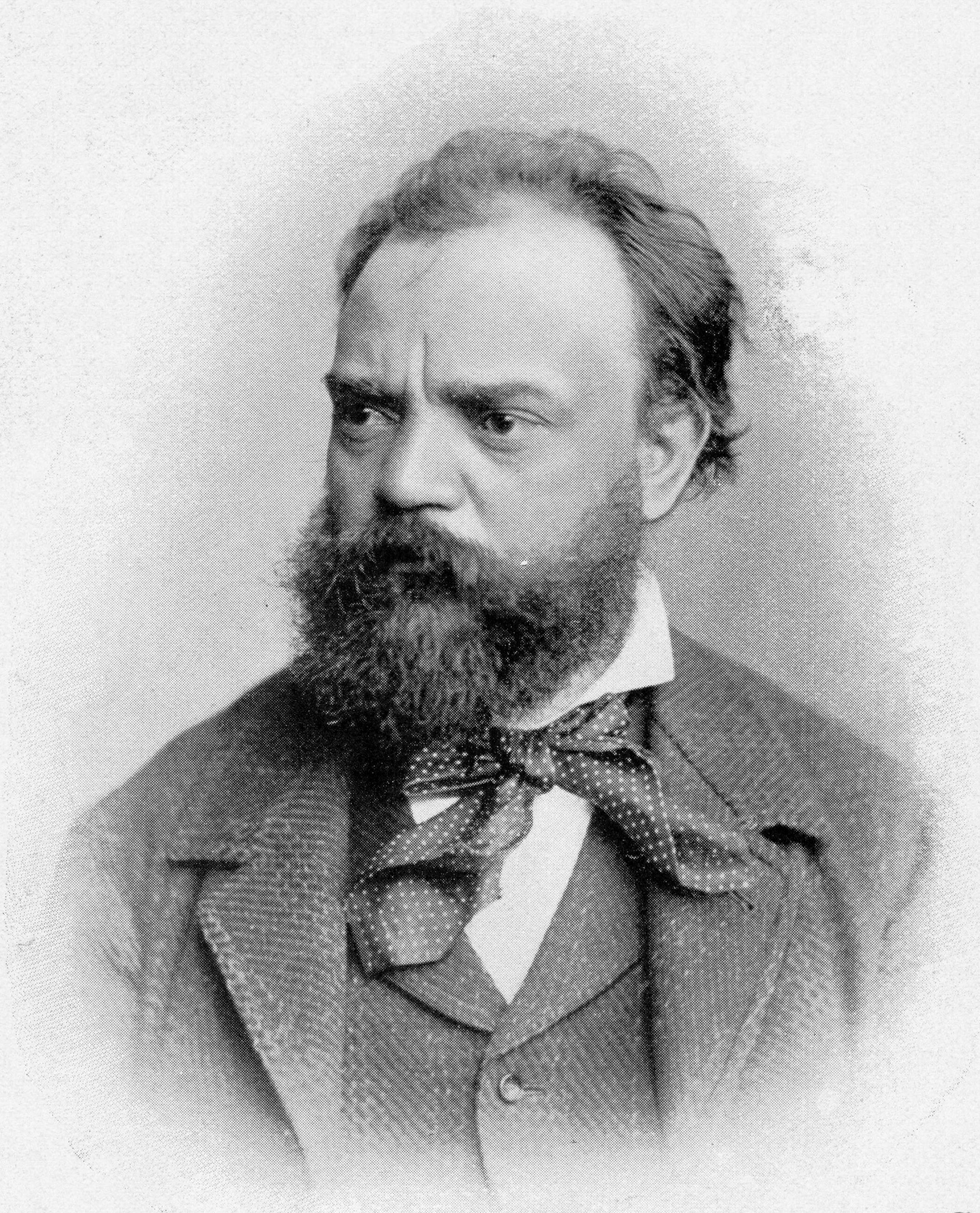
Antonín Dvořák in 1882

In 1887, Antonín Dvořák selected 12 of the 18 love songs from his collection Cypresses (Czech: Cypřiše), B. 11, of 1865, and arranged them for string quartet, B. 152. He also named these 12 pieces Cypresses. The 12 pieces he selected from B. 11 are Nos. 2–4, 6–9, 12, 14, and 16–18; the original songs are for solo voice and piano, and are settings of poems by Gustav Pfleger Moravský from the collection "Cypresses" (hence the title).

== Background ==
10 of these (1–9 & 11) were edited by Josef Suk and published by Hudební Matice Umělecké Besedy in 1921; the complete set of 12 appear in Soubourne kritické vydání, the Complete Critical Edition, from 1957. They were originally titled Echos of Songs, later Evening Songs, under which name numbers 1–3 & 9 were given their 1st performance by Karel Ondříček, Jan Pelikan, Petr Mares & Alois Neruda, at Umělecká beseda, on 6 January 1888. Dvořák inscribed them "These little compositions were originally songs (18), four of which were published as Op. 2 by Stary... I wrote them in 1865 and now, after 22 years, I have arranged them for quartet under the title 'The Echo of Songs'". They were given their present title by Josef Suk.

== Structure ==
The original songs are clearly recognisable in these string quartet arrangements, with melodic line, rhythm and harmony unchanged. For No.11, Dvořák changed the key, and half of them he extended by repetition, mostly with some interchange of allocation of lines to the different instruments.

The pieces are as follows:

B. 152	Title – ‘Cypresses’ (Cypřiše) – initially 'Echo of Songs' (Ohlas písní) (12):	Tempo	Notes
152/1	I Know that My Love to Thee (Já vím, že v sladké naději)	Moderato	2nd version of B.11/6, B.160/4
152/2	Death Reigns in Many a Human Breast (V tak mnohém srdci mrtvo jest)	Allegro ma non troppo	2nd version of B.11/1, B. 11/3, B.160/2
152/3	When Thy Sweet Glances Fall on Me (V té sladké moci očí tvých)	Andante con moto	2nd version of B.11/2, B.160/7
152/4	Love Will Never Lead Us to that Happy End (Ó, naší lásce nekvete to vytoužené štěstí)	Poco adagio	3rd version of B.11/8, B.123/4, B.160/1
152/5	The Old Letter in My Book (Zde hledím na tvůj drahý list)	Andante	2nd version of B.11/12
152/6	O, Lovely Golden Rose (Ó, zlatá růže spanilá)	Andante moderato	2nd version of B.11/7
152/7	I Wander Often Past Yonder House (Kol domu se teď potácím)	Andante con moto	3rd version of B.11/9, B.123/3, B.160/3
152/8	In The Deepest Forest Glade I Stand (Zde v lese u potoka)	Lento	2nd version of B.11/14, B.160/6
152/9	Thou Only, Dear One (Ó, duše drahá, jedinká)	Moderato	2nd version of B.11/4, B.160/8
152/10	There Stands an Ancient Rock (Tam stojí stará skála)	Andante maestoso	2nd version of B.11/16
152/11	Nature Lies Peaceful in Slumber and Dreaming (Nad krajem vévodí lehký spánek)	Allegro scherzando	2nd version of B.11/17, B.160/5
152/12	You Ask Why My Songs (Ty se ptáš, proč moje zpěvy)	Allegro animato	2nd version of B.11/18
