= String Quartet No. 13 (Dvořák) =

1895 composition by Antonín Dvořák

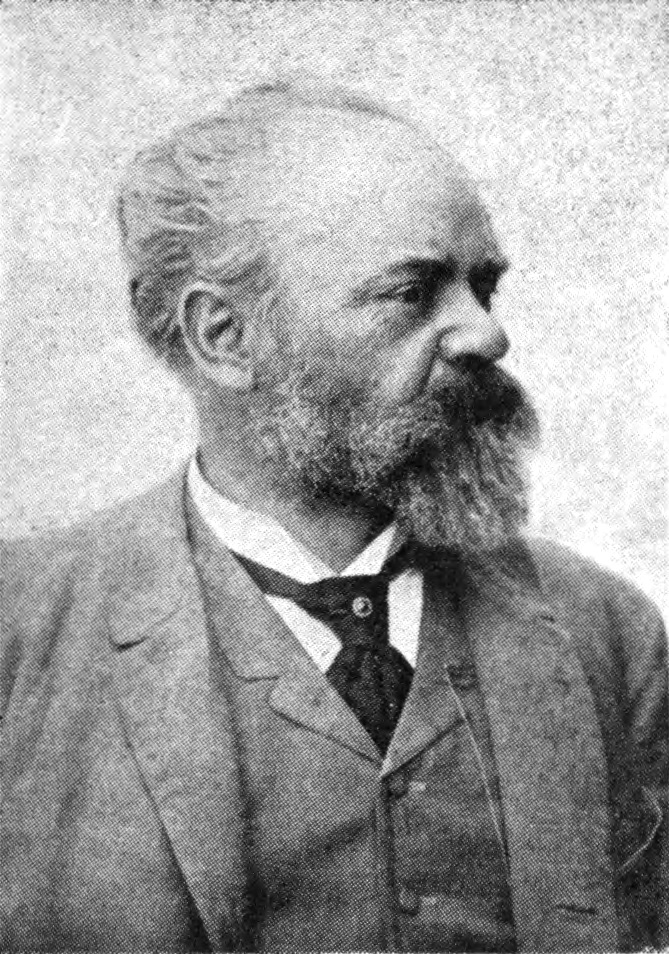
Antonín Dvořák in 1901

Antonín Dvořák composed the String Quartet No. 13 in G major, Op. 106 (B. 192), (Note: Dvořák's works have a confusing history of conflicting opus numbers, and so Jarmil Burghauser catalogued them more consistently in his book Antonín Dvořák; thematický katalog, bibliografie, přehled života a díla (Antonín Dvořák: Thematic Catalog, Bibliography, Life and Work), first published in 1960. It is because of this that Antonín Dvořák's compositions have Burghauser numbers used sometimes to identify them, with 192 used for this quartet.) between November 11 and December 9, 1895. It was first performed by the Bohemian Quartet in Prague on 9 October 1896.

== Structure ==
The string quartet contains four movements and lasts around 35 minutes. The movements are as follows:

1. Allegro moderato in G major and 2/4 time
  The 'playful, fluttering principal theme with which the movement opens' is followed by a seemingly remote second theme and countermelody, all of which becomes subject to some 'masterly' development (Šourek).
2. Adagio ma non troppo in E♭ major and 3/8 time
  Described by Šourek as "one of the loveliest and most profound slow movements in Dvorak's creation".
3. Molto vivace in B minor and 3/4 time
  More like a rondo, with episodes in A♭ major and D major for trios, than a typical scherzo (as is more often found in this place in a string quartet in the Romantic music era).
4. Finale. Andante sostenuto – Allegro con fuoco
  The brief Andante sostenuto, which is in 4/4 "common" time, introduces a vigorous finale in 2/4 time, and interrupts it toward the end of the work. The finale is in the work's main key of G major.

Andante sostenuto opening to the quartet's finale
