= Legends (Dvořák) =

Composition for piano duet by Antonín Dvořák

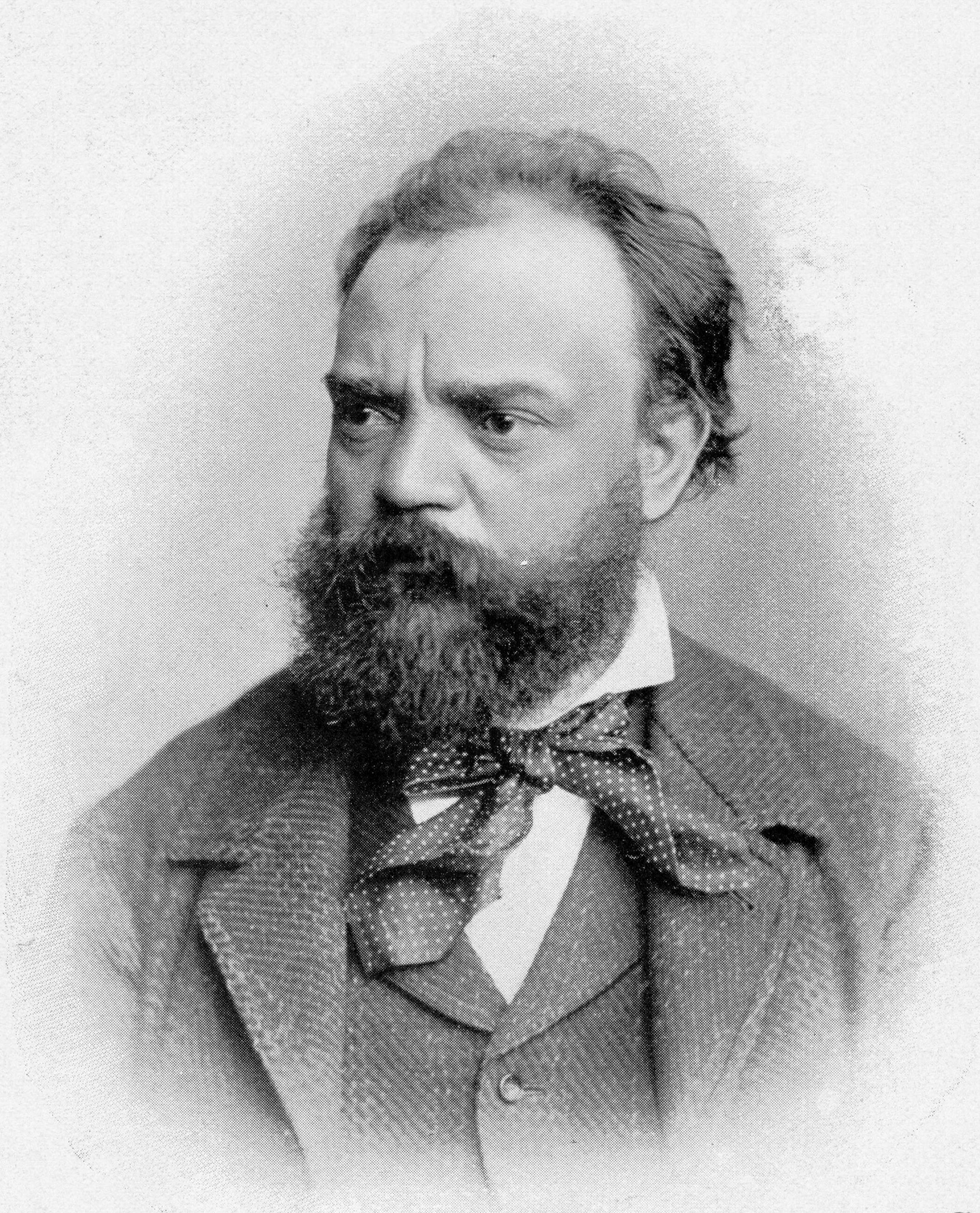
Antonín Dvořák in 1882

Legends (Czech: Legendy), Op. 59, B. 117, is a 40-minute group of ten pieces by the Czech composer Antonín Dvořák. They were written in early 1881 for piano duet and reset later that year for a reduced orchestra (B. 122).

== Background ==
On 15 October 1880, the day before finishing the score of his sixth symphony, Dvořák wrote to his publisher Fritz Simrock about his plans for the near future saying he hoped to finish a piano duet cycle, "Legends," in the next month. He did not, however, begin to sketch the work until 30 January 1881. The definitive shape of the piano version was created from 12 February to 23 March 1881, partly in Prague and partly in Vysoká u Příbrami.

Dvořák dedicated the composition to the critic Eduard Hanslick, who praised the cycle with great enthusiasm. The piano duet version was printed by the German publishing house Simrock in mid-1881. In that same year Dvořák arranged the cycle for orchestra. The orchestration differs in every individual piece. The work was premiered in 1882, at the concert of the Prague Conservatory (Nos. 1, 3, 4), under the baton of Antonín Bennewitz. Three more of the "Legends" (Nos. 2, 5, 6) were premiered at a concert of the Vienna Philharmonic on 26 November 1882, conducted by Wilhelm Jahn.

== Structure ==
The cycle consists of ten pieces:

1. Allegretto non troppo, quasi andantino (in D minor)
2. Molto moderato (in G major)
3. Allegro giusto (in G minor)
4. Molto maestoso (in C major)
5. Allegro giusto (in A♭ major)
6. Allegro con moto (in C♯ minor)
7. Allegretto grazioso (in A major)
8. Un poco allegretto (in F major)
9. Andante con moto (in D major)
10. Andante (in B♭ minor)

The approximate duration is 40 minutes.

Note: No. 7 (Allegretto grazioso, A major) was originally to have been the third piece, but Dvorak shifted it to its ultimate position before publication.
