= Scottish Dances (Dvořák) =

1877 compositions by Antonín Dvořák

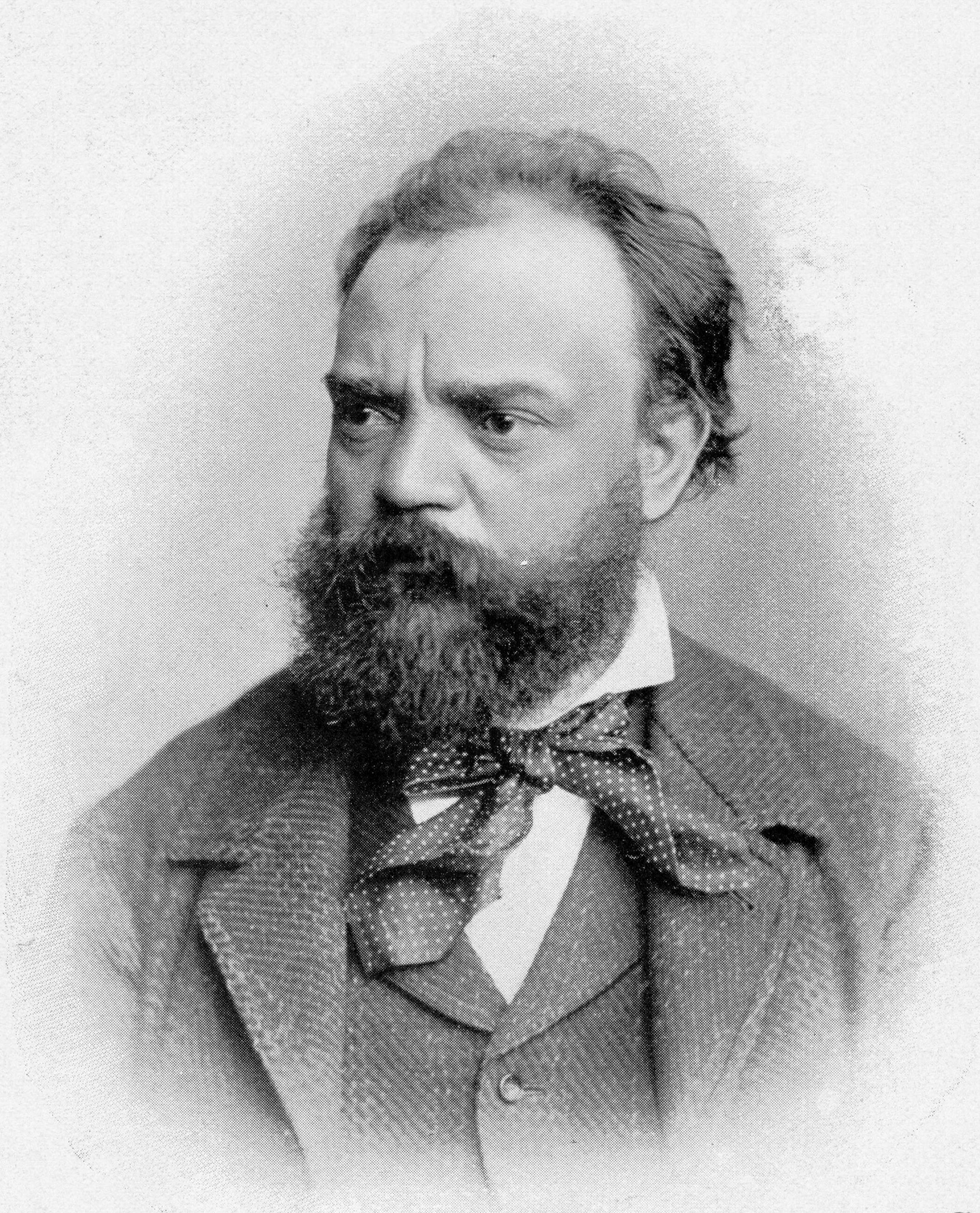
Antonín Dvořák in 1882

The Scottish Dances, Op. 41, B74, by Antonín Dvořák are a set of 15 Écossaises written for piano.

At the end of 1877, the composer had obstacles to inspiration. At the time, he was holding an Austrian state scholarship. This brought him into contact with Johannes Brahms, with whom he maintained a friendship. Inspired by him, he wrote these 15 pieces. Each of them consists of 16 bars, which are split by repeat signs in bar 8, and are always in 2/4 time. The tempo is Vivace.

The key structure is as follows: D minor, B♭ major, E minor, C major, E♭ major, B♭ major, A major, F major, D♭ major, G♯ minor, A♭ major, E major, C major, D minor.
