= String Quartet No. 10 (Dvořák) =

Dvorak's "Slavonic" String Quartet

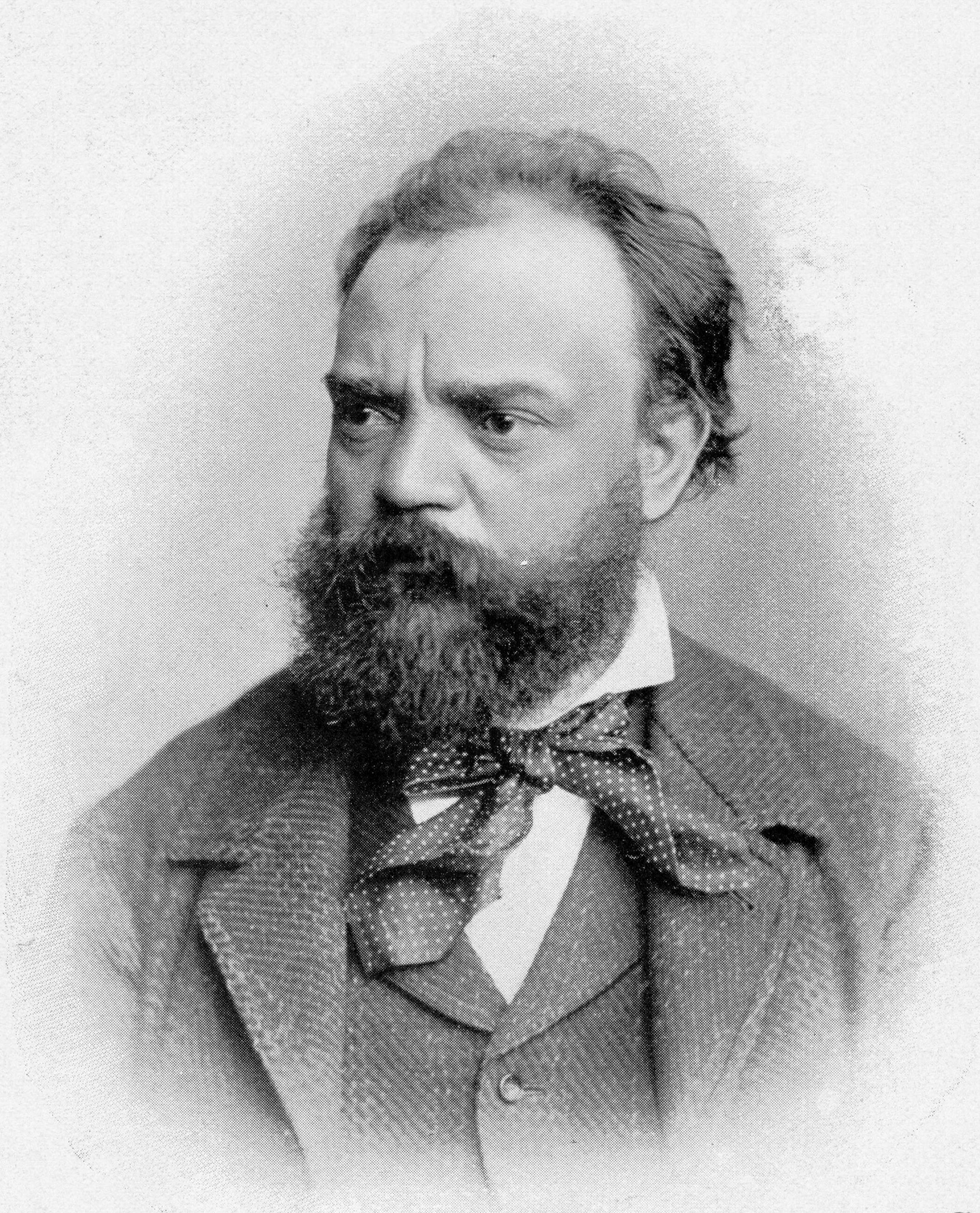
Antonín Dvořák in 1882

Antonín Dvořák wrote his String Quartet No. 10 in E♭ major, Op. 51 (B. 92), in 1879 at the request of Jean Becker, the leader of the Florentine Quartet. It is sometimes nicknamed the Slavonic Quartet (Becker had asked specifically for a "Slavonic Quartet" in the wake of Dvořák's "Slavonic Dances" and "Slavonic Rhapsodies").

The quartet is dedicated to Jean Becker. It was first performed by the Joachim Quartet at a private chamber music evening on July 29, 1879, in Berlin. It was published by Simrock, Berlin, in 1879.

== Structure ==
I. Allegro ma non troppo

II. Dumka: Andante con moto — Vivace

III. Romanza: Andante con moto

IV. Finale: Allegro assai
Performed by the Musopen String Quartet

It is composed of four movements:

1. Allegro ma non troppo
2. Dumka: Andante con moto — Vivace
3. Romanza: Andante con moto
4. Finale: Allegro assai

The Slavonic character of the Quartet derives from the scherzo movement which has the form of a Dumka, and from the last movement, which according to Šourek is 'an art stylization of the very characteristic Czech "skočna".'

A typical performance lasts about 32 minutes.
