= American Suite =

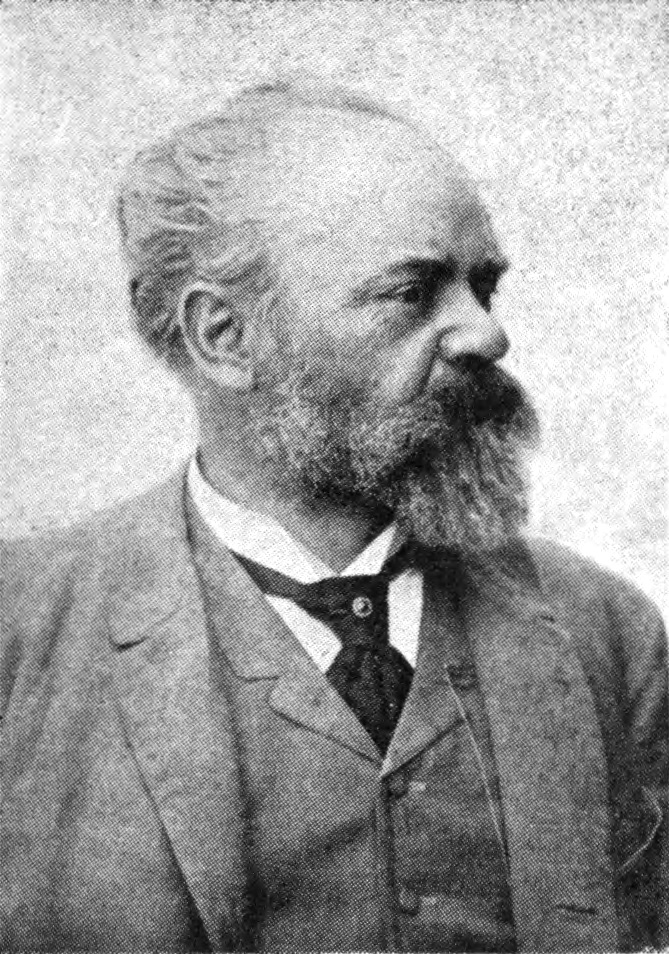
Antonín Dvořák in 1901

The American Suite in A major (Czech: Suita A dur), Op. 98b, B. 190, is an orchestral suite written in 1894–95 by Czech composer Antonín Dvořák.

Dvořák initially wrote the Suite in A major for piano, Op. 98, B. 184, in New York between February 19 and March 1, 1894. He orchestrated it in two parts more than a year after his return to the United States and immediately before his departure for Europe. The piano version was performed soon after its composition, but the orchestral version waited some years. The orchestral version of the American Suite was first played in concert in 1910 and not published until 1911, seven years after Dvořák's death in 1904.

== Movements ==
The suite is written in five movements, each with a marked rhythm:

1. Andante con moto
2. Allegro
3. Moderato (alla polacca)
4. Andante
5. Allegro

== Analysis and reception ==
As is often the case with Dvořák, the orchestral version gives the work a new breadth. The cyclic aspects of Dvořák's composition are apparent in that the main theme of the first movement recurs during the conclusion of the work. This opening theme is marked by his American-influenced style. It is difficult to determine whether it comes from the typical folk music of the New World or simply from the music of the Czech emigrants, which Dvořák liked to listen to during his stay in the United States.

This mix of American influence with Slavic tradition is also perceptible in the rhythm of the alla polacca third movement, and in the last movement's themes native to the Far East, played by flute and oboe in unison, where the orchestra passes easily from the minor theme to the major one.

Far from any exoticism, the art of Dvořák's orchestral work is in the field of pure music, and it is undoubtedly for this reason that Brahms appreciated it. Even in New York, when Dvořák encouraged his pupils to work on their own folk melodies, it was authentic recreation of popular folk music that he called for.

== Appearances in popular culture ==
Along with several other works by Dvořák (including some of the Slavonic Dances and the second movement of the New World Symphony), the first movement, Andante con moto is part of the soundtrack to Civilization IV.

The last movement, Allegro, was used in the trailer for The Elder Scrolls II: Daggerfall.

== References and further reading ==
- Döge, Klaus: "Antonín Dvořák", Grove Music Online, ed. L. Macy (Accessed December 16, 2006), (subscription access)
