= Moravian Duets =

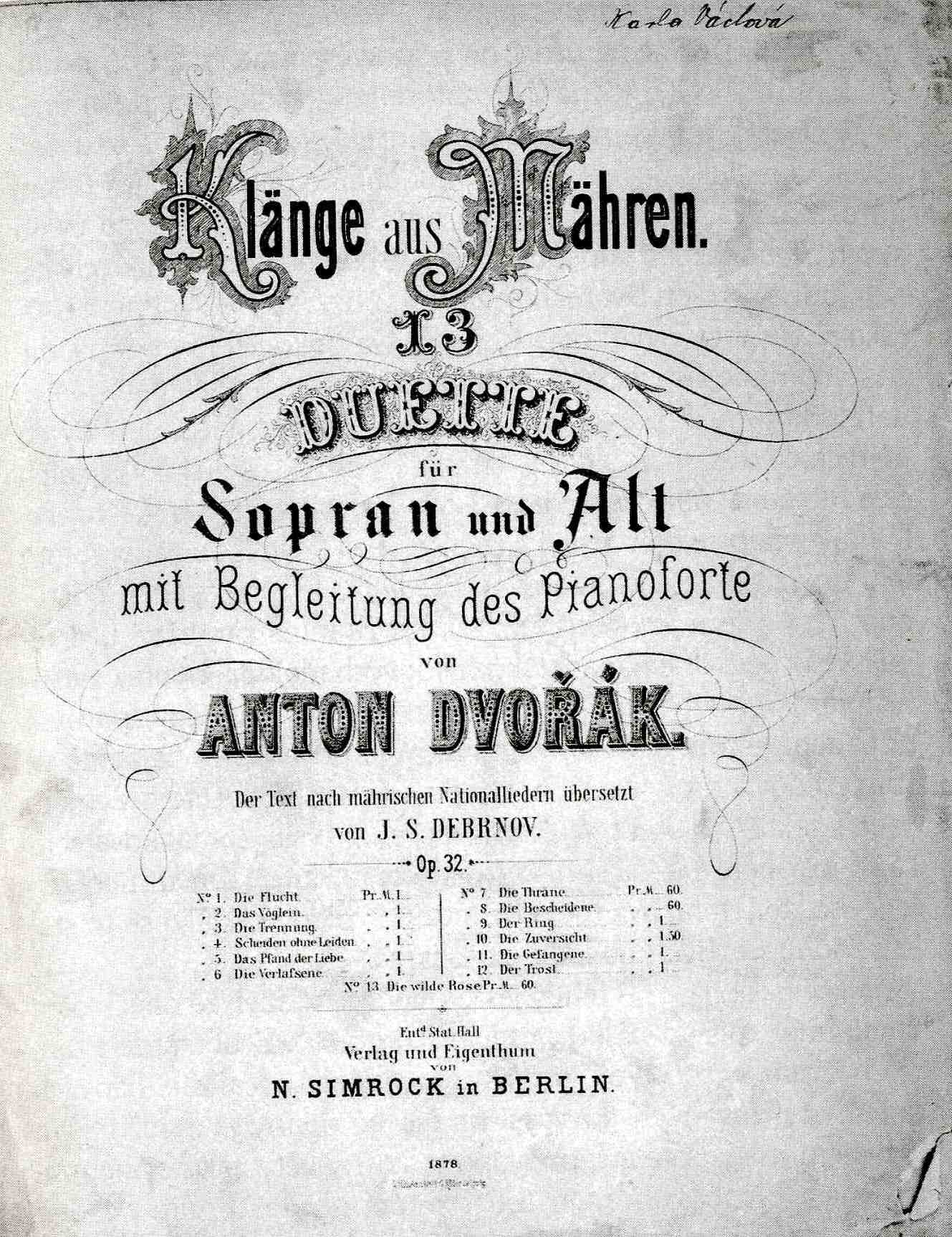
The title page of Moravian Duets by Antonín Dvořák, published in 1878 by Fritz Simrock.

Moravian Duets (in Czech: Moravské dvojzpěvy) by Antonín Dvořák is a cycle of 23 Moravian folk poetry settings for two voices with piano accompaniment, composed between 1875 and 1881. The Duets, published in three volumes, Op. 20 (B. 50), Op. 32 (B. 60 and B. 62), and Op. 38 (B. 69), occupy an important position among Dvořák's other works. The fifteen duets of Op. 32 are the most famous part of the cycle. Popular interest in the Moravian Duets was the starting point for subsequent works which propelled Dvořák to international fame.

== Background ==
In the mid-1870s when Dvořák was not yet a well-known composer, he worked as a music teacher for the family of Jan Neff, a wealthy wholesale merchant. Neff and his wife were active and enthusiastic singers. With Dvořák at the piano, they often would sing solos and duets together with their children's governess. Dvořák began to arrange the first Moravian Duets at Neff's request. He used as the source for his arrangements the collection Moravian National Songs, compiled by František Sušil (1804–1868), the pioneer collector of Moravian folk songs. Dvořák, however, did not content himself only with the musical arrangement of the folk melodies, he began to compose entirely new music for the folk-song texts.

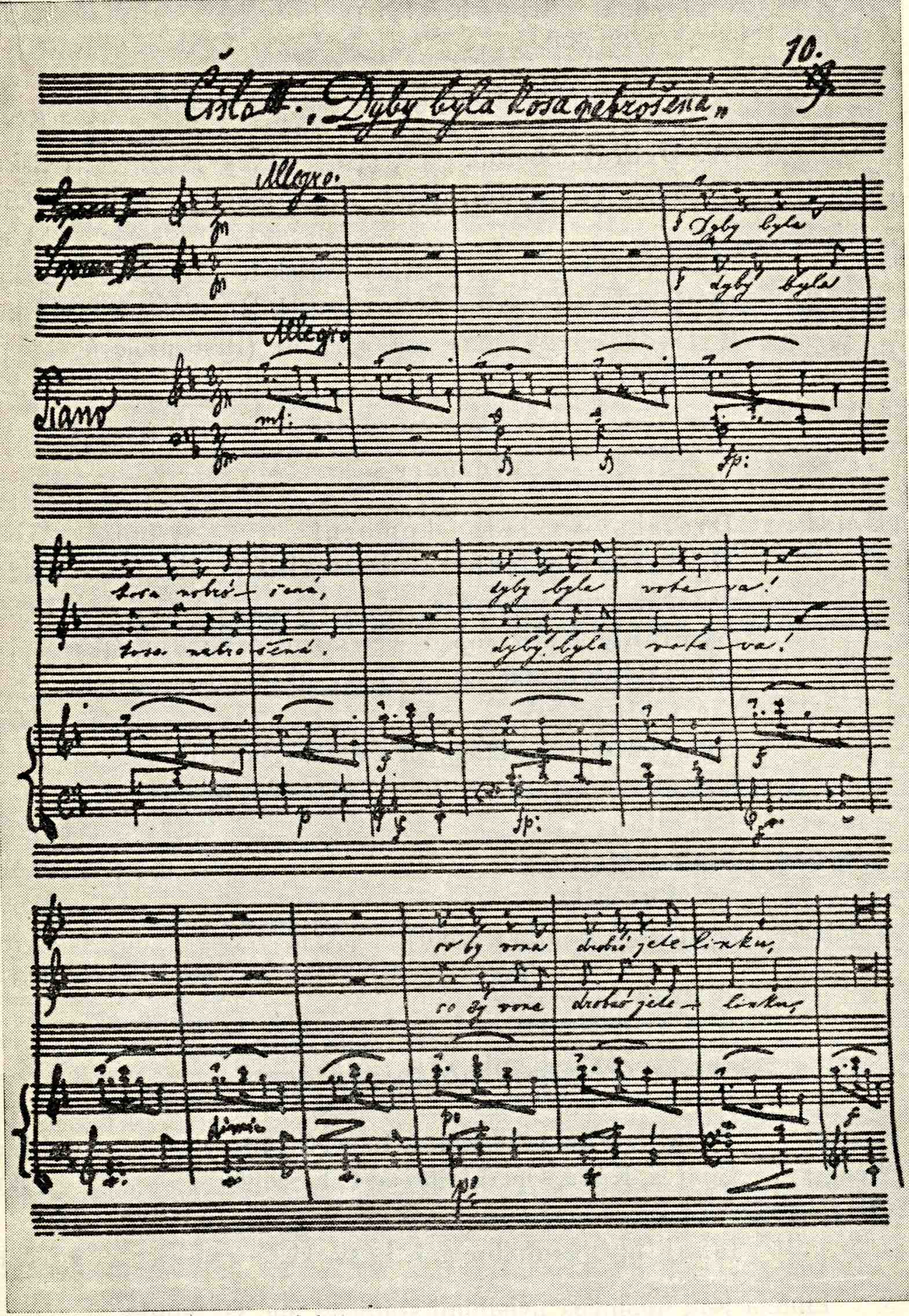
Dvořák's autograph score of "Dyby byla kosa nabróšená" from Moravian Duets

In March 1875 Dvořák composed the first volume of Moravian Duets, the "Three Duets for Soprano and Tenor, with Piano Accompaniment, Op. 20". His sponsor, Neff, was very delighted with them and he therefore asked Dvořák to compose more duets, this time for two female voices. Dvořák again agreed and, between May 17 and 21, 1876, composed the initial five songs, "Duets for Two Sopranos", which he designated in the manuscript as II. Cycle. These duets were originally published separately as Op. 29, then later combined with the Op. 32 publication. The remainder of the second volume was composed between June 26 and July 13, 1876, for soprano and contralto this time, entitled III. Cycle, Op. 32. A year later, in September and October 1877, Dvořák wrote another four duets, published as Op. 38. Dvořák returned to his Moravian Duets several years later in 1880, rearranging selections from Op. 32 for vocal quartet. These works were given number 107 in the Burghauser catalogue. Dvořák completed his large series of duets in 1881 with a final duet, a setting of Moravian folk poetry for soprano and alto, with piano accompaniment: Na tej našej střeše laštověnka nese (Lo, a swallow winging), B. 118.

The publishing of Moravian Duets represented very important turning point in the shaping of Dvořák's career. Arrangements for the first publication were managed by Jan Neff himself before Christmas 1876, under the title "Duets for Soprano and Contralto, with Piano accompaniment". The edition was lithographed by the firm of Emanuel Starý, Prague, and Neff gave this edition to Dvořák as a gift. The cycle was dedicated "to the honorable Jan Neff, Esquire, and his highly esteemed Spouse". It contained the duets of Op. 29 (Nos. 1–5) and Op. 32 (Nos. 1–4, 6–8 and 10). In the autumn of the 1877 Dvořák enclosed this edition of Moravian Duets with his request for an Austrian State grant for "young, talented and poor artists". One of the members of the Adjudicating Board in Vienna, Johannes Brahms, recommended the duets for publication to his German publisher Fritz Simrock. He wrote in his letter to Simrock from 12 December 1877: "You will find pleasure in them as I did, and, as a publisher you will be specially delighted with their piquancy. Dvořák is undoubtedly a very talented man – and poor besides. I beg you think it over." Simrock published the cycle at the beginning of 1878 under the German title Klänge aus Mähren, Op. 32. It is worthy to note that Simrock did not pay Dvořák a fee. The first Simrock edition awakened such lively interest among the public, that he published the cycle again in 1880. Simrock, encouraged by the immediate success of Moravian Duets, later asked Dvořák to write something with a dance-like character; his response was with the Slavonic Dances, which established his international reputation.

== Structure ==
Op.	B.	Date	Title		Notes
20	50	1875	Three Duets for Soprano and Tenor, with Piano Accompaniment, Op. 20		
20	50	1875	1. Darmo sa ty trápíš, můj milý synečku 2. Zatoč se mně, galanečko 3. Ach, co je to za slavíček	1. Why dost thou pine, dear lad?; 2. Turn about, my pretty sweetheart 3. Hark! The nightingale doth warble	Sušil No. 808, "Proměny", first two verses Sušil No. 785, "Zpěv, hudba a tanec" Sušil No. 781, "Chudoba"
32	60	1876	Cycle II – Duets for Two Sopranos		formerly published as Op. 29, now combined with Op. 32
32	60	1876	1. A já ti uplynu 2. Veleť, vtáčku 3. Dyby byla kosa nabróšená 4. V dobrým sme se sešli 5. Slavíkovský polečko malý	1. From thee now I must go 2. Fly, sweet songster 3. Keen will be the edge of yonder scythe-blade 4. Friends were we on meeting 5. Blithely towards this field	Sušil No. 808, from the middle of the eighth verse of the song "In vain you are pining" Sušil No. 787, "Vzdory"; Sušil No. 790, "Seč"; Sušil No. 786, "Společenké"; Sušil No. 789, "Láska, děva a žena"
32	62	1876	Cycle III – Duets for Soprano and Contralto, with Piano accompaniment		second portion of Op. 32
32	62	1876	1. Okolo háječka 2. Letěl holúbek na pole 3. Krásná moja milá 4. Hraj, muziko, hraj 5. Vuře šohaj, vuře 6. Žalo děvče, žalo trávu 7. Hájíčku zelený 8. Šlo děvče na trávu 9. Pod hájíčkem zelená se oves 10. Zelenaj se, zelenaj	1. Yonder brooklet ripples 2. Down a dove flew 3. Violet thou are, my love 4. Play, musicians, play 5. Mid the zephyr's soughing 6. Pretty maiden, locks a-flowing 7. Who will thy guard be now?; 8. Lightly a damsel tripped forth 9. Green the oats beneath the woodland 10. Grass, O forest grass, be green!	Sušil No. 324, "Voda a pláč" – text "from Rožnov" noted in the manuscript Sušil No. 332, "Holub na javoře" Sušil No. 329, "Skromná"; Sušil, section "Prsten", from the "New collections" – text "from Cáhnov" noted in the manuscript Sušil No. 237, "Vřezání do srdce" Sušil No. 188, "Zajatá" – text "from Pozlovice" noted in the manuscript Sušil No. 263, "Neveta"; Sušil No. 162, "Šípek" – text "from Příbor" noted in the manuscript Sušil No. 774, "Život vojenský" Sušil No. 321, "Přípověď neslibná" – text "from Branky" noted in the manuscript
38	69	1877	Four Duets for Soprano and Contralto, with Piano Accompaniment, Op. 38		
38	69	1877	1. Zakukala zezulenka sedňa na boře 2. Sviť měsíčku vysoko 3. Jidú ženci z roli 4. Zrálo jabko, zrálo	1. Hark! I hear a cuckoo calling 2. Brightly shine thou moon on high 3. Reapers now are riding 4. Lo, a ripening apple fell	Sušil No. 566, "Možnost"; Sušil No. 575, "Jablko"; Sušil No. 591, "Věneček"; Sušil No. 593, "Hoře"
–	107	1880	Five Duets for Female Quartet		selections from Op. 32 arranged for vocal quartet
–	107	1880	1. Letěl holúbek na pole 2. Zelenaj se, zelenaj 3. Šlo děvče na trávu 4. Veleť, vtáčku 5. Dyby byla kosa nabróšená	1. Down a dove flew 2. Grass, O forest grass, be green!; 3. Lightly a damsel tripped forth 4. Fly, sweet songster 5. Keen will be the edge of yonder scythe-blade	Sušil No. 332, "Holub na javoře" Sušil No. 321, "Přípověď neslibná" Sušil No. 162, "Šípek"; Sušil No. 787, "Vzdory"; Sušil No. 790, "Seč"
–	118	1881	Na tej našej střeše laštověnka nese	Lo, a swallow winging	Sušil No. 362, "Obdar za dar"; for soprano and alto, with piano accompaniment
