= Ferdinand Lachner =

Ferdinand Lachner (23 March 1856 – 23 October 1910) was a Czech violinist and music teacher.

== Early life and education ==
Lachner was born on 23 March 1856 in Prague, Bohemia, Austrian Empire. He had his first violin lessons with Erasmus Laub, the father of the violinist and composer Ferdinand Laub. He attended the Prague Conservatory from 1870 to 1876, where he studied violin with Antonín Bennewitz.

== Professional career ==
In 1879 Lachner worked as concertmaster in Breslau. He also worked in Warsaw and from 1883 to 1887 was concertmaster at the Prague National Theatre. From 1887 he taught at the Prague Conservatory, where his students included Ema Destinová.

He became friends with Antonín Dvořák, with whom he traveled through the Bohemian Forest in the summer of 1878. He formed a piano trio with him and cellist Alois Neruda (later with Hanuš Wihan). He premiered several of Dvořák's violin works and accompanied Dvořák and Wihan on a farewell tour of Bohemia and Moravia before Dvořák left for the US in 1892.

Lachner played in the public première performances of both of Smetana's string quartets, in 1879 and 1884 respectively.
