= Violin Sonatina (Dvořák) =

1893 musical composition by Antonín Dvořák

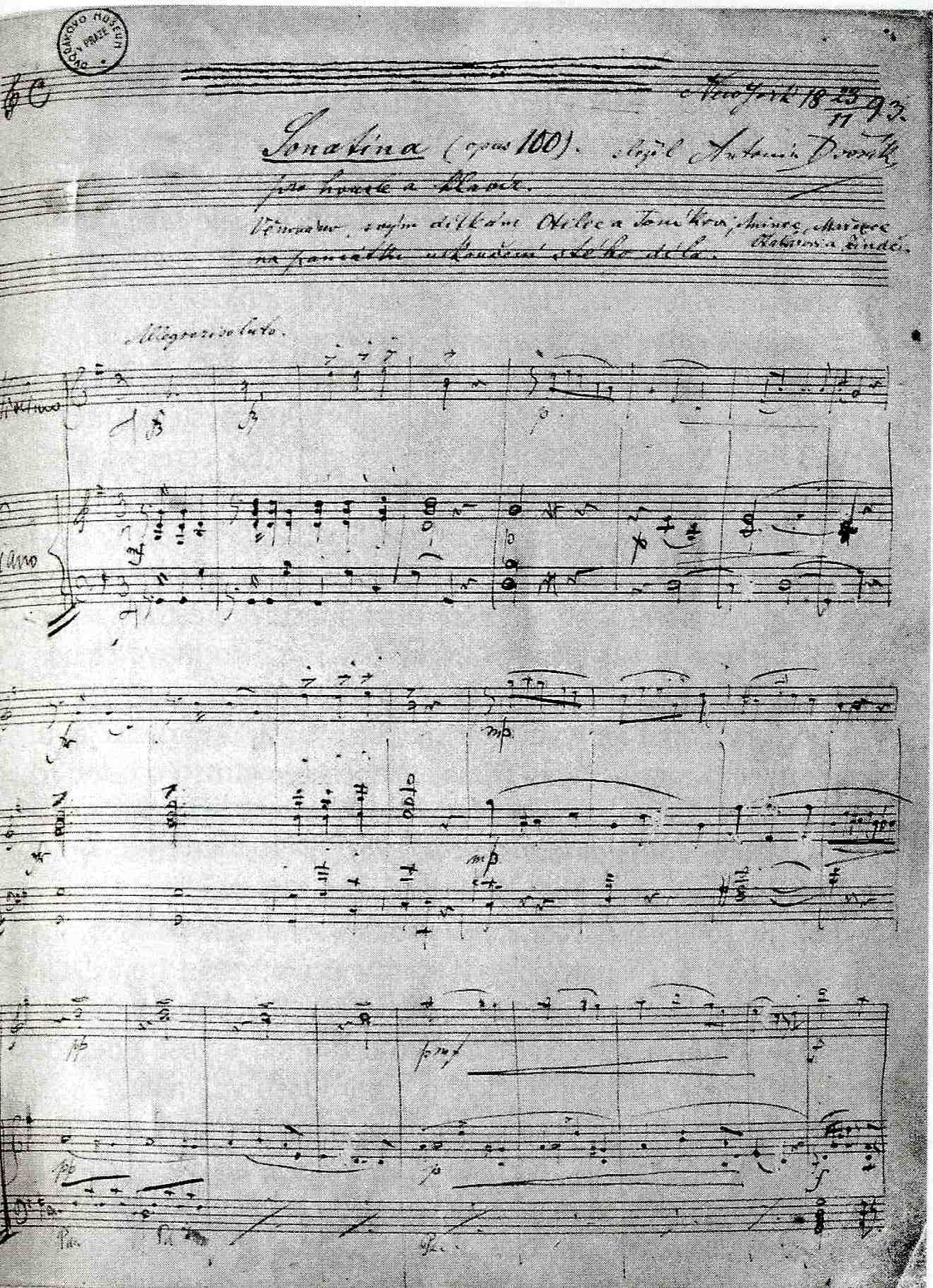
The title page of the autograph score of Dvořák's Sonatina with dedication, 1893

Violin Sonatina in G major, Op. 100
performed by the Park Sisters

The Violin Sonatina in G major (Czech: Sonatina G dur pro housle a klavír), Op. 100, B. 183, was written by Antonín Dvořák between November 19 and December 3, 1893, in New York City. It was the last chamber composition he wrote during his sojourn in the United States.

Dvořák catered the sonatina to the gradually developing musical abilities of his children, especially those of his 15-year-old daughter Otilie and 10-year-old son Toník, who played piano and violin respectively. In a letter to Fritz Simrock on January 2, 1894, Dvořák conceived the piece in the following terms: "It is intended for youths (dedicated to my two children), but even grown-ups, adults, should be able to converse with it..."

The sonatina was published by Simrock in Berlin in 1894. It also exists in a version for cello and piano.

== Structure ==
The sonatina has four movements:

1. Allegro risoluto, 3/4, G major
2. Larghetto, 2/4, G minor
3. Molto vivace, 3/4, G major
4. Allegro, 2/4, G major

Each movement exhibits a simple and clear, formal structure (hence the diminutive, cf. sonata). They all contain themes, which, like those already found in his other American chamber works (the String Quartet in F and the String Quintet in E♭), owe their inspiration to Native American music and African American spirituals, which are characterized by pentatonic scales and syncopated rhythm, among other traits. The mood of the composition is fresh and joyful. Only the second movement and part of the last movement are nostalgic; they are inspired by the composer's longing for his home country.

A motive for the slow movement Larghetto was hurriedly noted down on Dvořák's shirt sleeve while on a visit to Minnehaha Falls, in Minneapolis, Minnesota. Simrock sold this movement separately, without the composer's permission, and Fritz Kreisler often performed it as Indian Lament. It also appeared as Indian Canzonetta; such romantic titles were not the composer's, but were added subsequently by publishers.

== Footnotes ==
- Victor 12" record 74387, recorded 3/31/1914
- Antonín Dvořák: Sonatina G-Dur. Op. 100. Violino e piano. Urtext. Prague: Editio Bärenreiter, 2006. H 1364. ISMN M-2601-0389-4
