= String Quintet No. 3 =

String Quintet No. 3 may refer to:

- String Quintet No. 3 (Dvořák)
- String Quintet No. 3 (Mozart)
