= Op. 97 =

In music, Op. 97 stands for Opus number 97. Compositions that are assigned this number include:

- Beethoven – Piano Trio, Op. 97
- Dvořák – String Quintet No. 3
- Schumann – Symphony No. 3
- Shostakovich/Atovmyan – The Gadfly Suite
