= Symphonic Variations (Dvořák) =

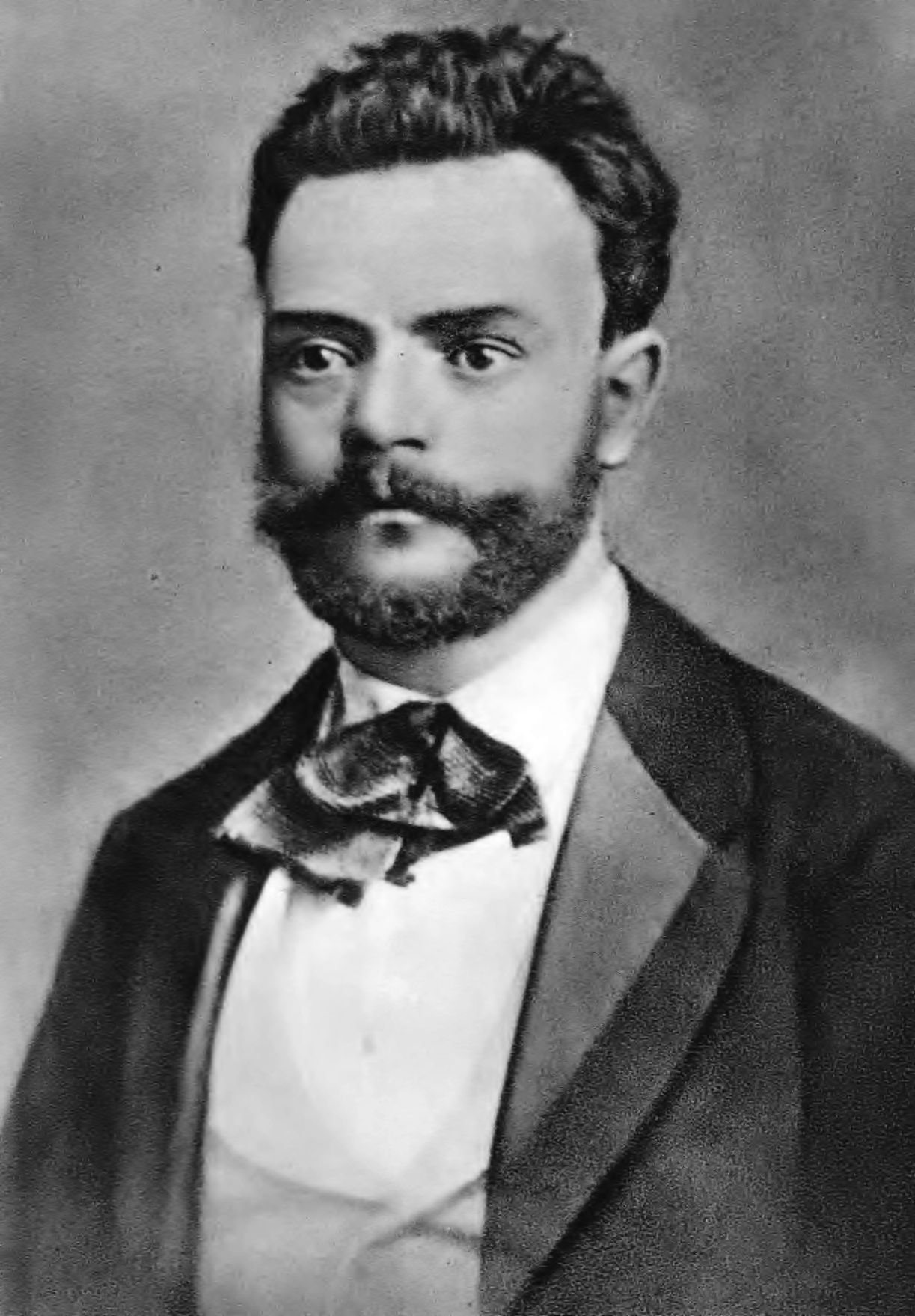
Antonín Dvořák in 1870

Antonín Dvořák's Symphonic Variations on the Theme “I am a fiddler” (Czech: Symfonické variace z písně „Já jsem huslař“) for orchestra, Op. 78, B. 70, were written in 1877. They are played fairly commonly, much like Johannes Brahms's Variations on a Theme by Haydn and Edward Elgar's Enigma Variations. They are often recorded in conjunction with his nine symphonies.

== Background ==
The Symphonic Variations were written between 6 August and 28 September 1877.

Supposedly, the work was a response to a challenge from a friend to write variations on a theme that seemed impossible for that purpose. Dvořák chose the third of his set of three part-songs for unaccompanied male voices (Sborové písně pro mužské hlasy), B. 66, titled "Huslař", or "Já jsem huslař" ("The fiddler", or "I am a fiddler"; text by Adolf Heyduk - the other two songs were from Moravian folk poetry). The three songs were written in mid-January 1877 and first performed on 4 March. The third song is in ternary form (ABA), where the lengths of the phrases are 7, 6, and 7 bars. But far from being impossible as a subject of variations, the theme turned out to be exceptionally well suited for that purpose.

The work was first performed in the Žofín concert hall in Prague on 2 December 1877, by the Provisional Theatre [Prozatímní divadlo] Orchestra, under conductor Ludevít Procházka. The occasion was a charity concert to raise money for the construction of a church in Prague's Smíchov district, and, although the audience liked the piece, there was no press coverage of it. Also, Dvořák's publishers were not interested in the work. Doubly discouraged, he put it aside for ten years, concentrating on other projects.

In March 1887, under pressure to produce more music, Dvořák revived the work, this time conducting it himself in Prague's Rudolfinum. The National Theatre Orchestra so pleased him with this second performance that he decided to send the score to the conductor Hans Richter. Richter was delighted with it and immediately included the piece in the programme for his forthcoming English tour. He wrote to the composer on 17 May after the first rehearsal with the Philharmonic Society in London on 13 May, "I am absolutely carried away. It is a magnificent work! I am so happy to be the first to produce it in London. But why have you held it back so long? These variations should shine in the first rank of your compositions".

The concert itself later that month was a huge success, and Richter wrote again, "At the hundreds of concerts which I have conducted during my life, no new work has ever had such a success as yours".

In December 1887, Vienna was exposed to the Symphonic Variations for the first time, again with Richter conducting. In the audience were Dvořák and his friend Johannes Brahms, who presented the composer with an exquisite cigarette holder to mark the occasion. Now his publisher N. Simrock, which had declined to publish the work ten years earlier, sat up and took notice, but instead of the opus number 28 that Dvořák had given it, they published it as opus 78, to suggest a brand new composition. The work has been given number 70 in the Burghauser catalogue. In around 1888, Dvořák arranged the Variations for piano four-hands, which are listed in the Burghauser catalogue as B. 514.

Dvořák's Symphonic Variations are among the three most frequently played of all sets of orchestral variations, along with Brahms's Variations on a Theme by Haydn and Elgar's Enigma Variations. Hubert Parry's Symphonic Variations were doubtlessly influenced by Dvořák's example.

== Orchestration ==
The work is scored for piccolo, 2 flutes, 2 oboes, 2 clarinets, 2 bassoons, 4 horns, 2 trumpets, 3 trombones, timpani, triangle and strings. It takes about 22 minutes to play.

== Structure ==
The theme is introduced Lento e molto tranquillo in C major, then proceeds through 27 variations in various tempi, ending in an ingenious fugal finale Allegro maestoso. The work remains in C major until Variation 17, moving into D major for Variation 18, B♭ major for Variation 19, B♭ minor for Variations 20–24, G♭ major for Variations 25 and 26, before returning to C major for the final variation and the finale.

It is predominantly in 2/4 time, but explores 3/4 for the Scherzo (Variation 17) and Tempo di valse (Variation 19), and also uses 3/8, 6/8 and 12/8 in some of the later variations. The final variation and the fugal finale return to 2/4.

== Recordings ==
The work has been recorded many times. Currently available recordings include those conducted by Marin Alsop, Jiří Bělohlávek, Colin Davis, Iván Fischer, John Eliot Gardiner, Stephen Gunzenhauser, Neeme Järvi, István Kertész, Rafael Kubelík, Theodore Kuchar, Zdeněk Mácal, Sir Charles Mackerras, Václav Neumann, Wolfgang Sawallisch, Peter Tiboris and Arturo Toscanini.
