= Symphony No. 4 (Dvořák) =

1874 musical work by Antonín Dvořák

- by Antonín Dvořák
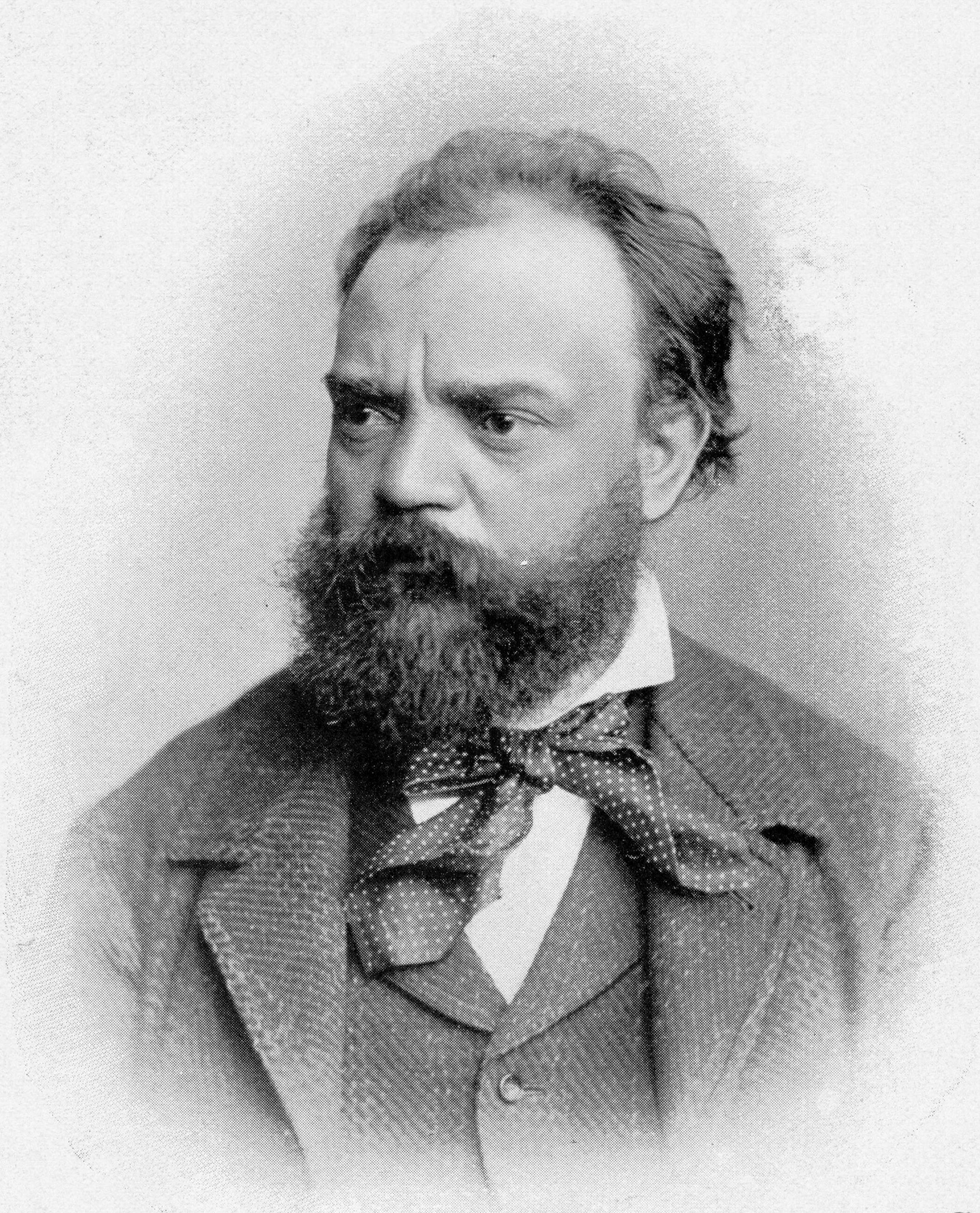
- Dvořák in 1879
- Key: D minor
- Catalogue: B. 41
- Opus: 13
- Composed: 1874
- Published: 1912
- Movements: 4

Premiere
- Date: 25 May 1874
- Location: Prague
- Conductor: Bedřich Smetana

The Symphony No. 4 in D minor, Op. 13, B. 41, is a classical composition by Antonín Dvořák composed in 1874.

== History ==
Dvořák composed his fourth symphony between January and March 1874. It shows an influence of Wagner in its themes' development, and even in its thematic material, i.e. principal theme of the second movement is a near-quotation from Tannhäuser, and the Trio section of the third movement includes a vivid reminder of a passage from the overture of Die Meistersinger von Nürnberg. The influence of Brahms could also be heard. Both influences will pervade many of his subsequent works. Despite these and other influences, Dvořák here shows true mastery in the formal aspects of his composition and also displays some of his original and even unique musical characteristics, which he will develop further in his future works. A portion of the scherzo was reused in the march In Troublous Times from his set of piano duets From the Bohemian Forest.

The first performance took place on 25 May 1874 at the concert of the Academy Readers' Society in Prague, and was conducted by Bedřich Smetana. The composer revised the symphony at the end of 1887 and beginning of 1888. The first (posthumous) edition of the symphony was published in 1912, and it is probable that this edition differs considerably from the 1874 original.

== Form ==
External audio
- Performed by the Berlin Philharmonic under Rafael Kubelík
- I. Allegro
- II. Andante sostenuto e molto cantabile
- III. Scherzo (Allegro feroce)
- IV. Finale (Allegro con brio)

The work consists of four movements:

1. Allegro (D minor), 446 measures
2. Andante sostenuto e molto cantabile (B♭ major), 142 measures
3. Scherzo (Allegro feroce); D minor, Trio in C major, 388 measures
4. Finale: Allegro con brio (D minor → D major), 691 measures

It is possible that the third movement of the symphony was initially an independent composition, completed before the other movements and added subsequently. The earlier neo-romantic atmosphere of his earlier symphonies is still present, but as a whole, the composition already bears the hallmark of Dvořák's artistic individuality. A typical performance of the work lasts about forty minutes. The 4th movement’s key signature changes to D major, in which key the symphony also ends.

== Instrumentation ==
The work is scored for an orchestra of two flutes (both doubling piccolo), two oboes, two clarinets, two bassoons, four horns, two trumpets, three trombones, timpani, bass drum, triangle, cymbals, harp, and strings.
