= Josef Jan Kovařík =

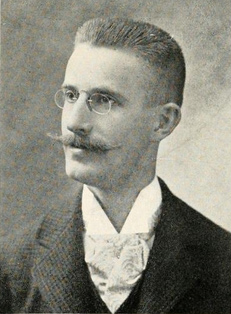
Kovarik in 1920.

Josef Jan Kovařík (July 11, 1870 – February 19, 1951) was an American musician.

== Early life ==
Josef Jan Kovařík was born in Spillville, Iowa, to a Czech-American family. He received his first music lessons from his father, Jan Josef Kovařík (1850–1939), who, at the age of 18, had come from the village of Všeteč in Bohemia (then part of Austria-Hungary) to the village of Spillville, and worked there for many decades as an organist, choirmaster, and music teacher, as well as in other Czech-German communities in Iowa and Minnesota.

== Musical career ==
Josef studied at the Milwaukee School of Music, and from 1889 at the Prague Conservatory, from which he graduated in 1892. While there, he met the composer Antonín Dvořák by chance, when Dvořák noticed a young man reading an American newspaper in František Urbánek's Prague bookstore. Dvořák, who had already agreed to go to the United States and head the National Conservatory there, offered Kovařík the position of his secretary, and in 1892 Kovařík, along with Dvořák and several of his family, arrived in New York.

Since Dvořák did not tolerate the New York urbanized rhythm of life, Kovařík invited him to his home town of Spillville, (where there was a strong expatriate Czech community) during the summer holidays of 1893; they travelled there after the arrival in New York of Dvořák's other four children (who had been cared for in Bohemia by Dvořák's sister-in-law Josefina Kaunitzova). Spillville had a positive effect on Dvořák: during 11 days in June 1893, he wrote one of his most celebrated works – the 12th String Quartet – and played it there several times with Kovařík and his family members, taking the first violin part himself. It was also here that Dvořák composed his String Quintet, Op. 97.

== Later years ==
Kovařík was appointed professor of violin at the New York Conservatory of Music on Dvořák’s recommendation. Kovařík was later engaged by the New York Philharmonic Orchestra, initially as a violinist and later playing viola, where he spent a total of 41 years. He also joined the Dannreuther String Quartet, with which he took part in the American premiere of another of Dvořák's works, the 13th String Quartet, as a member of the ensemble at Carnegie Hall in 1896. Later, from 1910, he played viola in the Bernard Sinsheimer Quartet.

== Death ==
Josef Jan Kovařík died in New York on February 19, 1951 at the age of 80.
