= Symphony No. 2 (Dvořák) =

Symphony by Antonín Dvořák

- Key: B♭ major
- Catalogue: B. 12
- Opus: 4
- Composed: 1865
- Movements: 4

Premiere
- Date: 1888
- Location: Prague
- Conductor: Adolf Čech

The Symphony No. 2 in B♭ major, Op. 4, B. 12 was composed by Antonín Dvořák between August and October 1865. Dvořák sent the score to be bound, but could not pay the binder, who kept the score. A friend of his, with whom he was sharing lodgings, Moric Anger, lent Dvořák the money to pay off the binder and retrieve his score. Later, when Anger asked for repayment of the debt, Dvořák was again unable to pay, so Anger took the score as security and only returned it when Dvořák retracted a previous threat to destroy it, something Anger had always advised against. In 1887 Dvořák revised the score, thinning out the rather dense orchestration.

It had its world premiere, and its sole performance during the composer's lifetime in March 1888, under Adolf Čech (who also premiered the 5th and 6th symphonies). It was generally well received.

== Form ==
External audio
- Performed by the Berlin Philharmonic under Rafael Kubelík
- I. Allegro con moto
- II. Poco adagio
- III. Scherzo (Allegro con brio)
- IV. Finale (Allegro con fuoco)

The work is in four movements:

1. Allegro con moto in B♭ major, 729 measures
2. Poco adagio in G minor, ends in G major on a Picardy third, 151 measures
3. Scherzo: Allegro con brio in B♭ major, with trio in A major, 501 measures
4. Finale: Allegro con fuoco in B♭ major, 570 measures

Unusually, all of these movements begin with introductory material unrelated to the major theme. The introduction to the final movement contains a four-note motif that Dvorák would quote some thirty-five years later in his opera Rusalka. Musicologist David R. Beveridge has concluded that this theme owes its origins to Dvorák's spurning by his pupil Josefína Čermáková, which occurred at approximately the time that Dvorák was writing this symphony and which the composer was prompted to recall by the plot of the opera.

A typical performance of the work has a duration of about 50 minutes.

== Instrumentation ==
The work is scored for two flutes, piccolo, two oboes, two clarinets, two bassoons, four horns, two trumpets, three trombones, timpani, and strings.
