= String Quartet No. 9 (Dvořák) =

1877 composition by Antonín Dvořák

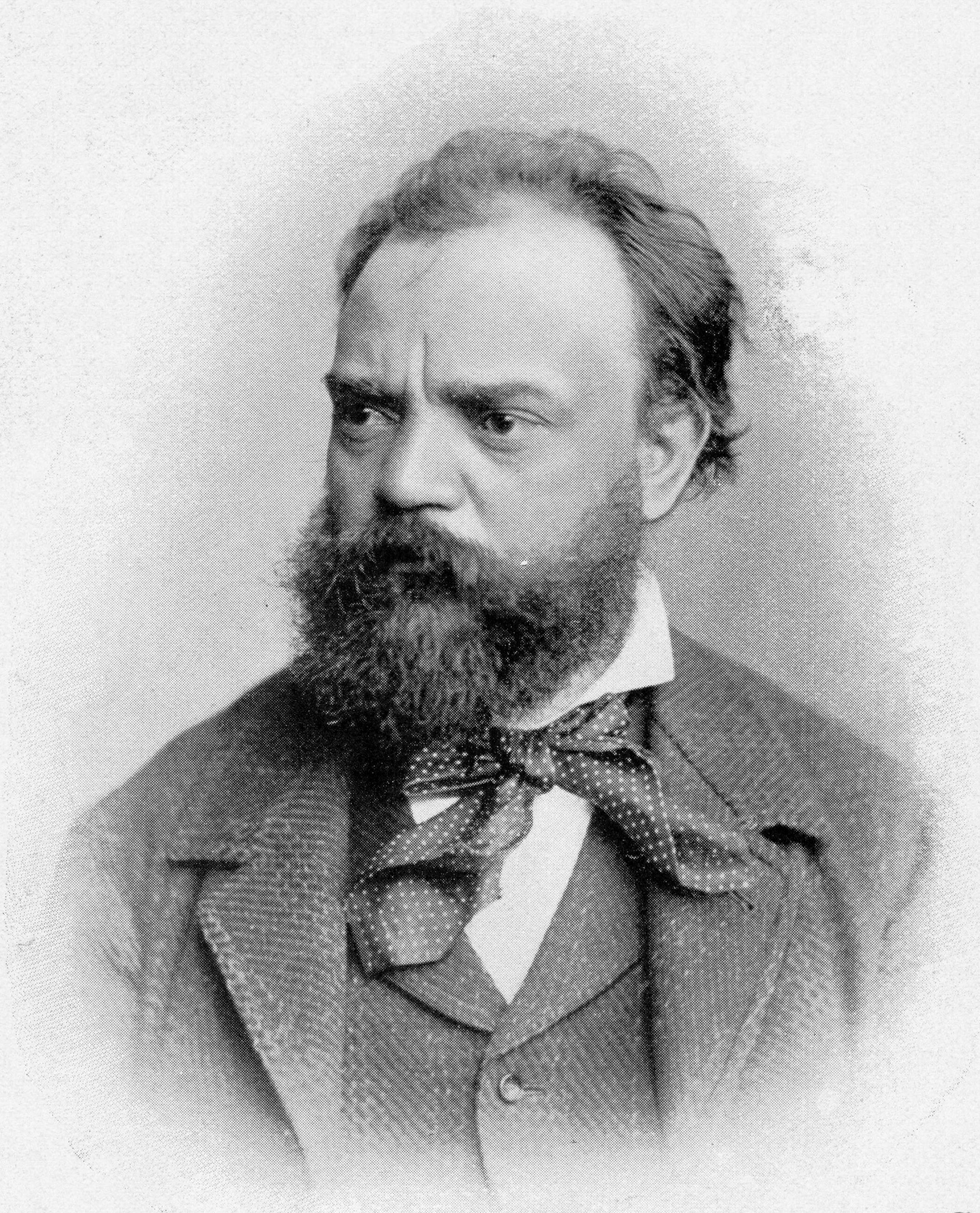
Antonín Dvořák in 1882

Antonín Dvořák finished the composition of his String Quartet No. 9 in D minor, Op. 34, (B. 75) on 18 December 1877, having probably started it in July of that year.

== Background ==
The work was composed in the months after the deaths of two of Dvořák's children, Ruzena (died 13 August 1877 at 10 months of age) and Otakar (died 8 September 1877, 3 1/2 years old). (Note: Among the six Dvořák children to survive into adulthood, the second of the boys was to be born in 1885 and also named Otakar.) It is dedicated to Johannes Brahms: Dvořák had won the Austrian State Prize fellowship prize three times in four years (1874, 1876, and 1877), and after this third success, Brahms, one of the members of the committee responsible for awarding the stipend, referred Dvořák to his own publisher, Fritz Simrock.

Dvořák revised it in 1879, and Herbert and Truffit suggest that the first performance may have been given by the Quartetto Heller (Giulio Heller and Alberto Castelli (violins), Carlo Coronini (viola), and Carlo Piacezzi (cello)), in Trieste, on 14 December 1881. Šourek, however gives a first performance at a concert of the musical section of the Umělecká beseda (Arts Discussion Group) in Prague on 27 February 1882, by Ferdinand Lachner, Petr Mareš, Václav Borecký, and Alois Neruda.

== Structure ==
The work is composed in four movements:

1. Allegro, D minor, 3/4
2. Alla polka, allegretto scherzando, B♭ major – G minor, 2/4
  with Trio, quasi l'istesso tempo, E♭ major, 3/8
3. Adagio, D major, 3/4
4. Poco allegro, D minor, 6/8

== Footnotes ==
=== Sources ===
- Herbert, Peter J. F.; Trufitt, Ian T. (2004). Antonin Dvořák: Complete Catalogue of Works. Dvořák Society occasional publications no. 4 (4th revised ed.). The Dvořák Society for Czech and Slovak Music. ISBN 0-9532769-4-5.
- Šourek, Otakar. The Chamber Music of Antonín Dvořák. Translated by Samsour, Roberta Finlayson. Czechoslovakia: Artia – via Internet Archive.
