= Ian Krykorka =

Canadian children's writer

Ian Krykorka (born 1975) is a Canadian children's author, based in Toronto, Ontario.

Books published so far include Silver Moon: Stories from Antonín Dvořák's Most Enchanting Operas (Fitzhenry and Whiteside, 2004), based on Rusalka, King and Charcoal Burner and The Devil and Kate, Rusalka Lyrical Fairy-Tale Opera First Performed in Prague 1901 (2005) and Carl the Christmas Carp a holiday story set in Prague. (Orca Book Publishers, 2006).

Previously, he compiled a two-volume guide to the Canadian children's literature industry, The Storymakers. Volume One, Illustrating Children's Books: 72 Artists and Illustrators Talk About Their Work, was published in 1999. This was followed in 2000 with Writing Children's Books: 83 Authors Talk About Their Work.

== Personal life and career ==
Krykorka was born in Toronto, Ontario, Canada, to children's book illustrator Vladyana Krykorka. He graduated from the University of Toronto in 1999 with a BA in English and Philosophy and obtained his MA in 2002.

In 2006 he won the Municipal Chapter of Toronto IODE award for Carl the Christmas Carp. The Edmonton Journal described Christmas Carp as, "Boldly illustrated and matter-of-factly told... (a story that,) cuts through all the treacle that tends to infect the holiday season.

== Reviews ==
Education Book Reviews reviews Storymakers
Canadian Materials reviews Silver Moon
Canadian Materials reviews Carl the Christmas Carp (Sept. 15, 2006)
childrenslit.com reviews Carl the Christmas Carp
Access my Library reviews Carl the Christmas Carp (Oct., 2006)
Quill and Quire reviews Carl the Christmas Carp (Nov., 2006)
