= Mořic Stanislav Anger =

Mořic Stanislav Anger (12 March 1844 – 2 August 1905) was a Czech conductor and composer.

== Life ==
Mořic Stanislav Anger was born on 12 March 1844 in Sušice. He studied at the gymnasium in Sušice, from 1856 at the secondary school in Písek and later in Vienna. In 1862 he began studying at the Polytechnic Institute (now the Czech Technical University in Prague) in Prague. However, he did not complete his studies and devoted himself fully to music.He received his basic musical education in Písek and Vienna. In Prague he studied violin with Josef Řebíček and composition with Josef Bohuslav Foerster.

He became a member of the so-called Komzák Band, an orchestra founded by the bandleader and composer Karel Komzák Sr. and which gained such an excellent reputation in Prague that it became the orchestra of the Provisional Theatre as a whole. Antonín Dvořák also played in this band alongside Anger, with whom Anger lived on Senovážné náměstí in 1864–1865. About this time, Anger lent Dvořák money to pay for printing his Second Symphony.

In addition to his work as a violinist in the orchestra at the Provisional Theatre, his career as a conductor also began. He first took over the management of farces and operettas, and later (on the recommendation of Bedřich Smetana) became the conductor of the Švand Theatre Company in Plzeň.

In the years 1870–1881, he held several engagements at leading Austrian stages (Salzburg, Bad Ischl, the Vienna Comic Opera, Olomouc, Graz). On 1 May 1881, he became the second conductor of the National Theatre in Prague. He remained in this position until his death in 1905.

In 1882 he conducted the premiere of Dvorak's opera Dimitrij.

On 14 October 1883, he conducted the world premiere of Dvořák's Violin Concerto in A minor in the Rudolfinum in Prague with František Ondříček as soloist.

In 1884 he introduced Bizet's Carmen to Prague audiences; it was reprised under his baton in 1891 and 1900.

From 1888 to 1901, in addition to his duties at the National Theatre, he was also the choir director at the Church of St. Francis of Assisi in the Old Town. His numerous church compositions date from this period.

He died on 2 August 1905 in Prague.

== Compositions ==
=== Operas ===
- Viola (1872, unfinished)
- Die Wächter der Moral (1879, performed in Czech translation at the Provisional Theatre as Záletníci in 1882)

=== Operettas ===
- The Devils
- Hadrian

=== Ballets ===
- The Magic Bassoon (1870)
- Czech Feast (1884)
- A Christmas Eve Dream (1886) – libretto: Augustine Berger

Among his orchestral compositions, Homage to Bedřich Smetana (1895) deserves attention.

In addition to church compositions, he composed music for plays and a whole series of songs and choirs.
