= Michael Beckerman (musicologist) =

American musicologist

Michael Beckerman (born 1951) is an American musicologist specializing in Czech and Eastern European music. He has served as Carroll and Milton Petrie Chair and Collegiate Professor of Music at New York University and as Leonard Bernstein Scholar-in-Residence at the New York Philharmonic. He is Dean of the UCLA Herb Alpert School of Music. One music journalist summarized Beckerman's career with: "In short, he's a big deal."

== Early life and education ==
Beckerman graduated from Hofstra University in 1973. He intended to study Mozart in graduate school, but while working at a record store, he was offered free recordings of Czech music in exchange for promoting their sales, since customers rarely showed interest in composers such as Josef Mysliveček, Josef Suk, Vitěslav Novák and Bohuslav Martinů. Beckerman earned his Ph.D. from Columbia University in 1982. He described his choice of Janáček’s theoretical works for his doctoral subject as an unwitting example of "buying low and selling high".

== Career ==
Beckerman held faculty positions at Washington University in St. Louis and the University of California, Santa Barbara before arriving at New York University, where he was Chair of Music from 2004-2013. Beckerman served as Distinguished Professor of History at Lancaster University in England. He was the Leonard Bernstein Scholar-in-Residence at the New York Philharmonic from 2016 to 2018.

Beckerman organized a symposium at the Library of Congress about Dvořák's American years.

Beckerman commented for the NPR series "Fishko Files" about "symphonies that swing" when composers bring jazz music to the concert hall and about Tchaikovsky's use of 5/4 time for the so-called "waltz" from the Pathetique symphony. Beckerman commented for WQXR about Dvořák's African-American student Harry T. Burleigh's influence on Dvořák's composing and about getting beyond the antisemitism to appreciate Wagner's music.

Beckerman has written for the New York Times about subjects including Dvořák, Bach, Schubert, the music of baseball, and the dark sides of Christmas songs. In one piece, Beckerman noted that the tune that most excites students in grade school orchestras is the theme from "Jeopardy". The NYT quoted Beckerman's 'amusing' program notes about a musical suite based on a Gogol novella: "it is never useful to scold composers for their taste in literature".

Beckerman co-edited a volume of essays on Martinů for the 2025 Bard Music Festival.

== Awards ==
- ASCAP Deems Taylor Award for outstanding liner notes
- Dvořák and Janáček Medals from the Czech Ministry of Culture
- Laureate of the Czech Music Council
- Honorary doctorates from Palacký and Masaryk Universities in the Czech Republic
- Gratias Agit Award from the Czech Ministry of Foreign Affairs
- Harrison Medal from the Society of Musicology in Ireland

== Books ==
- The Doctrine of One: Personal Encounters with Film, Art and Music, Open Book Publishers, 2026.

https://www.openbookpublishers.com/books/10.11647/obp.0510

- Martinů and His World, University of Chicago Press, 2025.
- Classical Music: Contemporary Perspectives and Challenges, Open Book Publishers, 2021.
- Martinů's Mysterious Accident, Pendragon Press, 2007.
- Janáček and His World, Princeton University Press, 2003.
- New Worlds of Dvořák, W.W. Norton, 2003.
- Janáček and Czech Music (with Glen Bauer), Pendragon Press, 1995.
- Janáček the Theorist, Pendragon Press, 1994.
- Dvořák and His World, Princeton University Press, 1993.

== Articles for The New York Times ==
- “Bach was a Musician’s Companion to Tragedy,” 2019.
- “The ‘Czech Lute,’ A Baroque Masterpiece, Gets Filled In,” 2015.
- “Exploring Bach for his Gypsy Side,“ 2009.
- “Electronica from the 1920’s; Ready for Sampling,“ 2005.
- “The Guitarist is Metal. No, Not Heavy Metal,” 2004.
- “Magic, Music, and Toys That Talk Back,” 2004.
- “Czech Music With Nary a Polka to Be Found,” 2004.
- “Don Quixote Adrift in Unreality Squared,” 2004.
- “The Cunning Little Video,” 2003.
- “An Experimental Composer on a Good Day,” 2003.
- “Polanski’s ‘Pianist’ and the Case of the Missing Nocturne, 2003.
- “Rattle Raps, and 12 Cellists Serenade,” 2002.
- “Dvořák and the American Soul,” 2002.
- “Their Stage is a Box, Their Music Exquisite,” 2002.
- “A Laggard Goes to the opera By a Circuitous Route,” 2002.
- “Music of Cold,” 2002.
- “High and Low Meet, and Mix With Drink,” 2001.
- “Pushing Gypsiness,” 2001.
- “Schubert Takes a Hand in a Clever Film Score,” 2000.
- “Ravelstein Knows Everything, Almost,” 1999.
- “Dreaming of a White Christmas,” 1998.
- “Tripping With Mr. Broucek,” 1996.
- “Dvořák Does Disney? If Anything the Opposite," 1996.
- “Making History Sound as Good as It Looks,” 1995.
- “The Tales Overtures Could Tell,” 1994.
- “The Odd Pull of ‘Jeopardy’ on 62 Flutes,” 1994.
- “Tonality is Dead--Long Live Tonality,” 1994.
- “Capturing the Pounding Pulse of New York City,” 1994.
- “All Right, So Maybe Haydn Didn’t Write Them. So What?,” 1994.
- “It’s Time to Play Ball, and Stretch and Sing,” 1994.
- “Claire Bloom Can’t Sing, So If Opera is Out, Melodrama Must Be In,” 1994.
- “In This Little Opera, of Sorts, the Piano is a Hero, of Sorts,” 1994.
- “Dvořák Loved Pigeons and Trains, Not Ideology,” 1994.
- “A Tradition, From Boom to Bust,” 1993.
