= Prague Autumn International Music Festival =

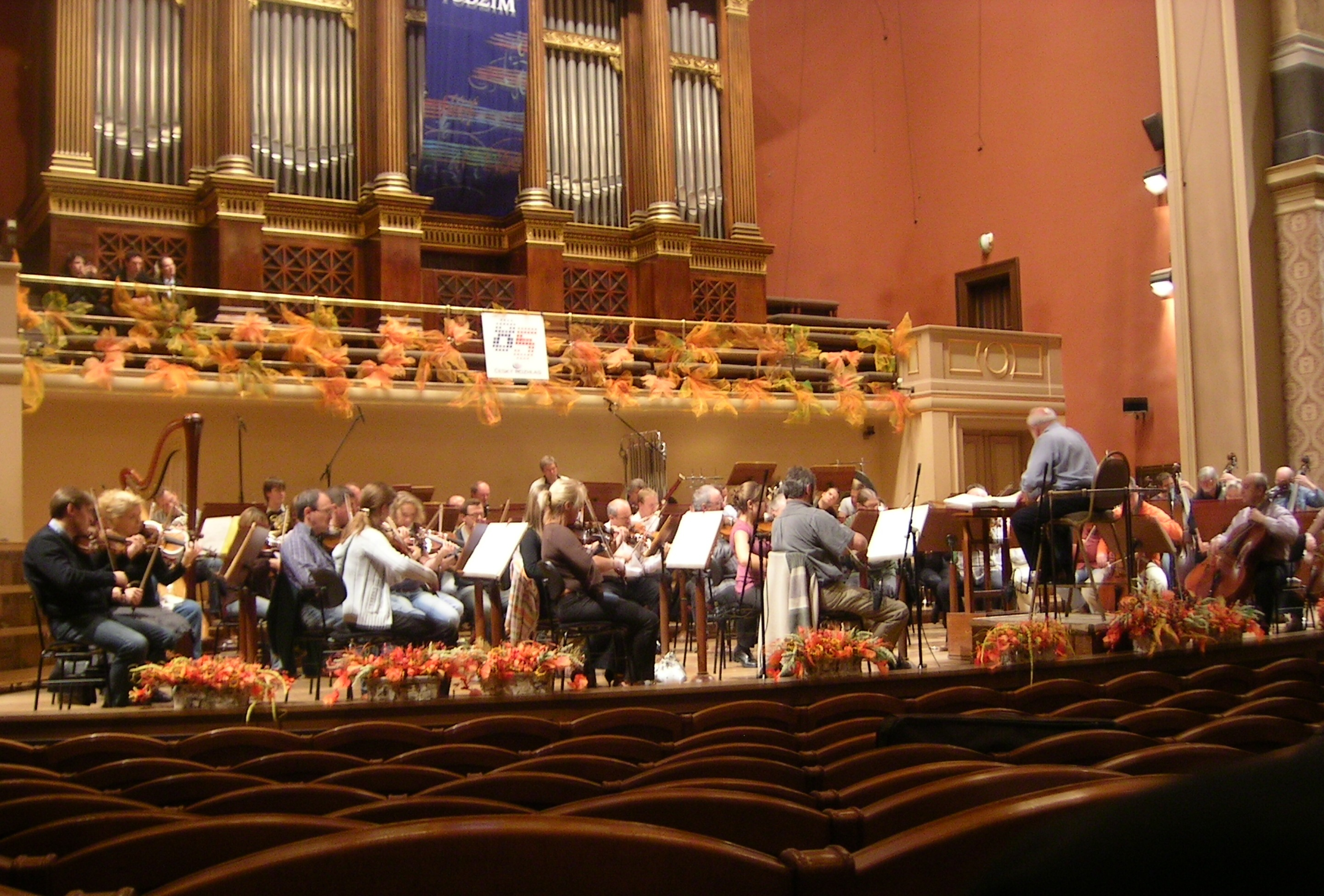
Prague Autumn International Music Festival

Prague Autumn International Music Festival (1991–2008) was the second largest classical music festival in Prague held annually in Prague Rudolfinum in September. It was organised under the auspices of Václav Klaus, president of the Czech Republic and was co-produced by the City of Prague.

The Dvořák Prague International Music Festival is a major music festival held in the autumn since 2008 at the Rudolfinum in Prague. The festival focuses on music of the Romantic period, but also extends back into the Classical period, and forwards to the 20th and 21st centuries.

== History ==
The history of the Autumn Festival begins soon after the Velvet revolution. Many performers from all over the world have appeared at the festival. In 14 years the festival saw performances by 66 orchestras, 96 conductors, 122 singers, 53 pianists, 31 violin players, 24 cellists, 16 choirs, 6 chamber ensembles, and 23 other instrumentalists. The number of attendees approaches 270,000, plus millions of radio listeners all around the world and domestic TV viewers.

== Highlights of the festival ==
- Israel Philharmonic Orchestra under Zubin Mehta
- Bruckner Orchester Linz
- RSO Wien under Bertrand de Billy
- Moscow Philharmonic Orchestra under Yuri Simonov
- Filarmonica della Scala under Riccardo Muti
- Beethoven Orchester Bonn
- State Symphony Capella of Russia under Valeri Polyansky
- Royal Liverpool Philharmonic Orchestra
- Budapest Festival Orchestra under Iván Fischer
- Mariinsky Theatre Orchestra under Valeri Gergiev
- BBC Scottish Symphony Orchestra under Ilan Volkov
- BBC Philharmonic under Gianandrea Noseda
- Bamberger Symphoniker under Jonathan Nott
- Chamber orchestras appearing at the festival have included the English Chamber Orchestra, the Scottish Chamber Orchestra, London Brass Virtuosi, the City of London Sinfonia, Sinfonia Varsovia with Krzysztof Penderecki and Orchestre de chambre de Paris with John Nelson.

Conductors and soloists have included: Marin Alsop, Semyon Bychkov, James DePreist, Iván Fischer, Valery Gergiev, Marek Janowski, Zubin Mehta, Riccardo Muti, Gianandrea Noseda, Jonathan Nott, Krzysztof Penderecki, Ilan Volkov, Maxim Fedotov, Vadim Gluzman, Leonidas Kavakos, Shlomo Mintz, Vadim Repin, Isaac Stern, Steven Isserlis, Boris Pergamenschikow, Heinrich Schiff, Yefim Bronfman, Barry Douglas, Hélène Grimaud, Arcadi Volodos, Gábor Boldoczki, Galina Gorchakova.

== See also ==
- Designblok
