= Otakar Šourek =

Otakar Šourek (1 October 1883 – 15 February 1956) was a Czech musicologist and music researcher, choirmaster and pianist. He is best known as an expert, publicist and popularizer of the works of Antonín Dvořák.

== Life ==
Otakar Šourek was born on 1 October 1883 in Prague.

He enjoyed a musical environment from birth, as his father sang in Hlahol Praha (The Prague Hlahol Singing Society). He devoted himself to music throughout his life, although it was not his main profession. After completing high school, he studied civil engineering at the Czech Technical University in Prague. From 1901 to 1906, while working as a construction engineer, he studied music with M. Svobodová and K. Steckr (piano, harp, singing). Subsequently, from 1907 until his retirement in 1939, he worked as a clerk in the Prague magistrate's office.

However, his musical and especially music-journalistic activities, which he carried out alongside his job, were extensive and significant. As a musician, he worked in the Academic Orchestra, and was the choirmaster of the Technical Choir and the Smetana Choir . As a music journalist, he became famous primarily for his articles in magazines and newspapers such as Hudební revue (from 1906), "Venkov" 1918–41, Smetana, Samostatnost, Národní obzor, Rozvoj, Lidové noviny, and Auftakt. His contributions mainly concerned Antonín Dvořák, but also other Czech composers. His most significant literary achievement is the four-volume monograph Život a dílo A. Dvořáka /The Life and Work of Antonín Dvořák, whose volumes were brought out at dates from 1916 to 1933. He also edited sheet music editions of Dvořák's compositions. His work contributed greatly to the spread of Dvořák's fame in the Czech lands and abroad. In 1950, he became a member of the editorial team of an edition of the composer's complete works.

He died in Prague on 15 February 1956.

== Bibliography ==
Main source:

- The orchestral works of Antonín Dvořák : Šourek, Otakar, 1883-1956 ...
- Život a dílo A. Dvořáka/ A. Dvořák's Life and works,
  - vol. 1 Prague 1916, 3rd ed. 1954,
  - vol. 2 Prague 1917, 3rd ed. 1955,
  - vol. 3 Prague 1930, 2nd ed. 1956,
  - vol. 4 Prague 1933, 2nd ed. 1957,
    - German translation Vienna 1935, English translation New York 1941 and translations into other languages
- Dvořáks Werke. Ein vollständiges Verzeichnis/ Dvořák's Works. A Complete Catalogue, Berlin 1917, Czech version by Skladby Dvořákovy. Seznam chronologický, tematický a systematický/ Chronological, thematic and systematic list, supplemented by J. Burghauser, 1960, German translation Kassel 1960, English translation London 1960
- A. Dvořák, Prague, 1919, titled A. Dvořák. Monografie s obrazovýmí a facsimile přílohami, 2nd ed. 1929, 3rd ed. 1947, English translation by A. Dvořák. His Life and Works, Prague 1952, French translation by A. Dvořák. Vie et oeuvre , Prague 1952, German translation by A. Dvořák. Sein Leben und sein Werk, Prague 1953, Chinese translation. Shanghai 1954, Japanese translation Tokyo 1961, abridged German version, with P. Stefan titled Dvořák. Leben und Werk, Vienna 1935, English translation New York 1941
- L. Janáček. Výlety pána Broučka/ The Trips of Mr. Brouček, Prague 1920
- Tří ouvertury: „V přírodě”, „Karneval” a „Otello”/ Three overtures: "In Nature's Realm", "Carnival" and "Otello", Prague 1921
- Dvořák's Symphonies, Prague 1922, 3rd edition 1948, English translation 1952
- Dvořákova čítanka/ Dvořák's Reader, Prague 1929, 3rd ed. 1946
- A. Dvořák. Školní spisek/School notebook, Prague 1930, 2nd edition 1941
- J. Nef and A. Dvořák, Prague 1932
- Episoda z osudů Jakobina/ Episode from the Fates of Jacobin, Prague 1939
- Smetana's "Má Vlast", Prague 1940
- Tematické rozbory symfonických skladeb A. Dvořáka/ Thematic analyses of symphonic compositions by A. Dvořák, Leipzig 1941, translated into German. pt. Thematische Einführungen in Werke von A. Dvořák, Leipzig 1941
- A. Dvořák and H. Richter, Prague 1942, English translation (fragm.) R. Newmarch, "Musical Times" LXXIII, 1932
- Dvořákovy skladby komorni/ Dvořák's chamber music compositions, Prague 1943, 2nd ed. 1949, German translation by P. Eisner entitled A. Dvořák. Werkanalysen II. Kammermusik, Prague 1955, English translation Prague 1956
- Dvořákovy skladby orchestrální/ Dvořák's Orchestral Works, 2 vols., Prague 1944, 1946
- Komorní skladby B. Smetany/ Chamber compositions by B. Smetana, Prague 1945, English translation Westport 1970
- R. Karel, Prague 1946
- Z Dvořákovy cesty za slávou/ From Dvořák's journey to fame
- List of works by A. Dvořák, Prague 1951
- A. Dvořák a jého „Rusalka”/ A. Dvořák and his "Rusalka", Prague 1951, 2nd ed. 1952
- A. Dvořák a jého „Jakobin”/ A. Dvořák and his "Jacobin", Prague 1953
- A. Dvořák, Prague 1954, translated into 8 languages
- Čert a Káča/ The Devil and Kate, a cheerful fairy tale by A. Dvořák, Prague 1954
- J. Suk, Prague 1954, translated into 8 languages
