= String Quintet No. 3 (Dvořák) =

Composition by Antonín Dvořák

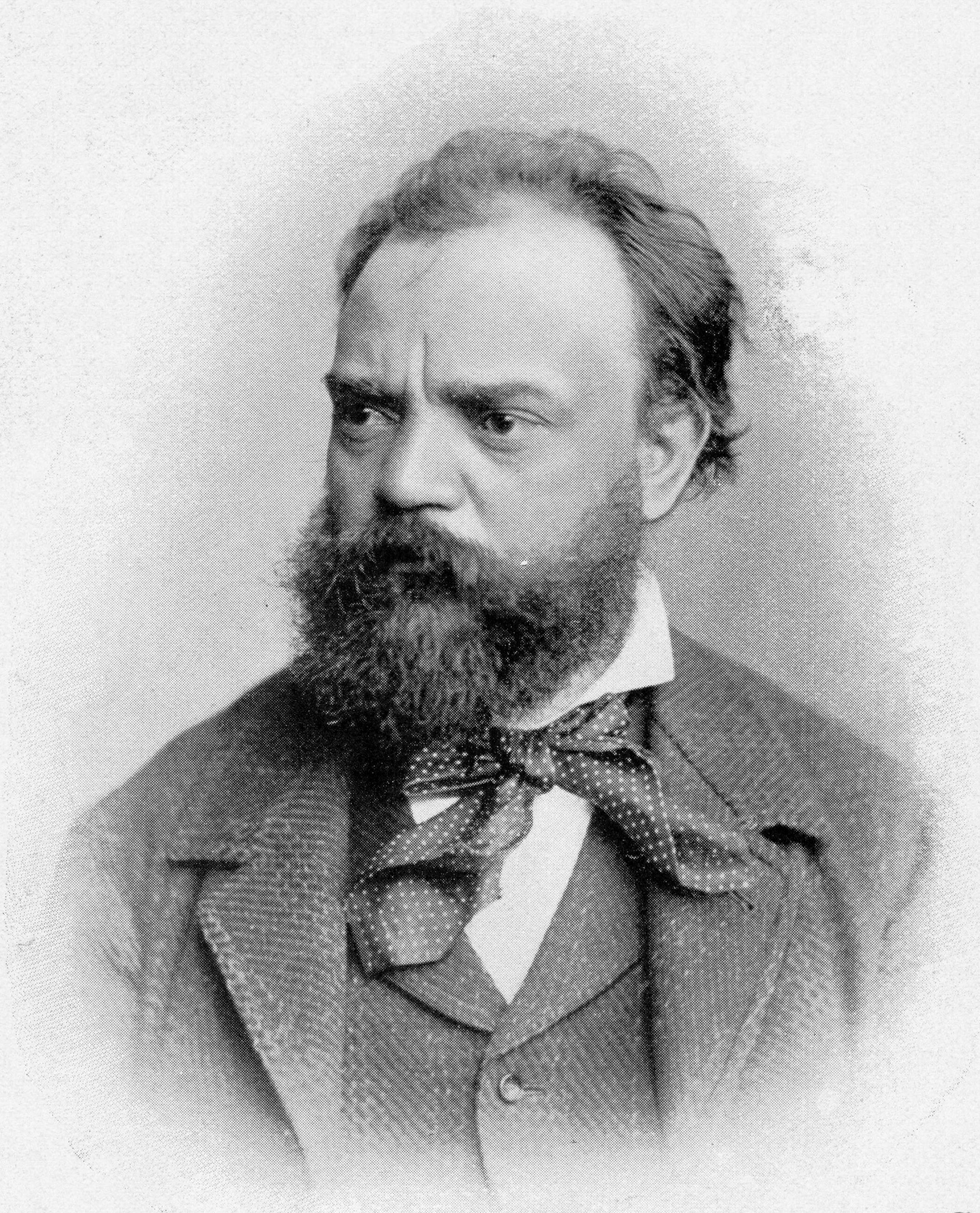
Antonín Dvořák in 1882

The String Quintet No. 3 in E♭ major, Op. 97, B. 180, was composed by Antonín Dvořák during the summer he spent in Spillville, Iowa in 1893. It is a "Viola Quintet" in that it is scored for string quartet with an extra viola. It was completed in just over a month, immediately after he wrote his American String Quartet (Op. 96, B. 179). Like the Quartet, the Quintet finely captures the inflection of Dvořák's Bohemian idiom with American inspirations.

The Quintet was premiered by the Kneisel Quartet in New York with the addition of Max Zach, on 13 January 1894, along with the second performance of the Quartet. The Quintet was very favorably reviewed, as comparable to Mozart. The reviewer noted that the Quintet was "of the kind about which a commentator may write a small volume without exhausting his admiration or fully describing their beauties". It received its European premiere on 10 October 1894, in Prague, by the Czech Quartet and Ferdinand Lachner.

In an extensive analysis for the Chamber Music Society of Lincoln Center, Bruce Adolphe shows the influence of pentatonic scales on the Quintet, suggests that the unusual percussive opening of the Scherzo (second movement) may relate to tribal music that Dvořák heard in Spillville, as well as noting that the theme of the third movement may be related to Dvořák's known interest in creating a new American national anthem.

The string quintet consists of four movements:

1. Allegro non tanto (E♭ major)
2. Allegro vivo (B major)
3. Larghetto (A♭ minor → A♭ major), in double variation form.
4. Finale. Allegro giusto (E♭ major)
