= Jarmil Burghauser =

Czech composer, conductor, and musicologist

Jarmil Michael Burghauser (born Jarmil Michael Mokrý; 21 October 1921, Písek – 19 February 1997, Prague) was a Czech composer, conductor, and musicologist.

Burghauser's parents were painters František Viktor Mokrý and Zdenka Burghauserová. He studied piano since he was 6 years old under Jaroslav Křička and later Otakar Jeremiáš. He continued his musical education by studying composition with Václav Talich at Prague Conservatory. From 1948 to 1953 Burghauser was a choirmaster in National Theatre.

After the short-lived Prague Spring, he incurred the disfavor of his country's Communist regime and had to adopt the pseudonym Michal Hájků in order to write a series of compositions in a style which evoked earlier periods of music, called Storia apocrifa della musica Boema.

== Works ==
=== Operas ===
- Alladina and Palomid (1943–1944)
- The Miser (1949)
- Karolinka a lhář (1950–1953)
- The Bridge (1963–1964)

=== Ballets ===
- Honza a čert (1954)
- The Servant of Two Masters (1957)
- Tristram and Isolde (1969)

=== Film scores ===
- Premiera (1947)
- Z mého života (1955)
- Legenda o lásce (1961)
- Labakan (1961)
- The Day the Tree Blooms (1961)
- Místo v houfu (1964)
- Polka jede do světa (1965)
- Jarní vody (1968)

== Cataloguing of Dvořák's works ==
Burghauser created a reliable catalog of works by Antonín Dvořák. It is to replace the traditional opus number, which is not only incomplete but also confusing for the case of Dvořák. Today academic references to Dvořák's works often use the Burghauser number from the catalogue.

== See also ==
- List of compositions by Antonín Dvořák by catalogue number
