= List of compositions by Antonín Dvořák by genre =

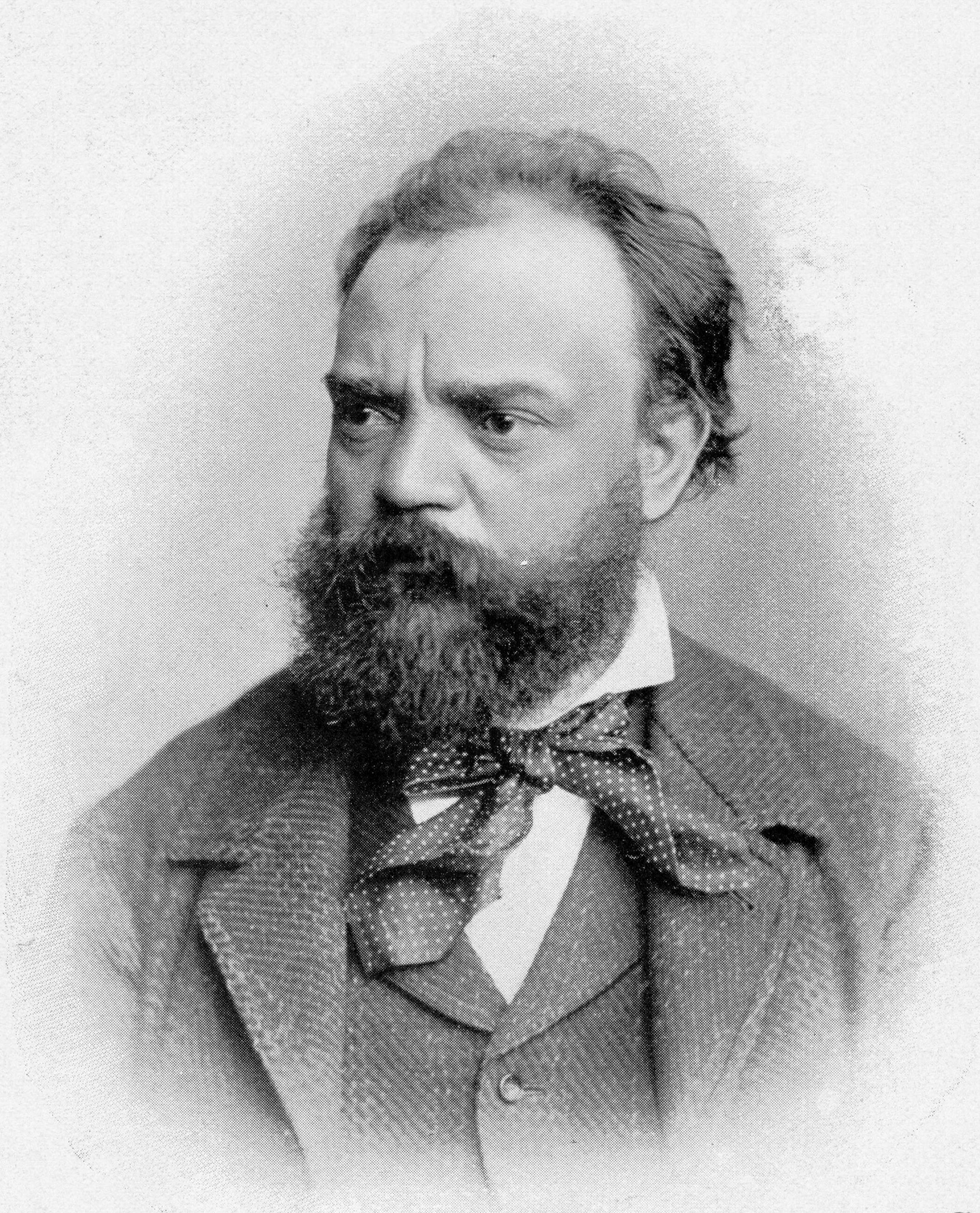
Antonín Dvořák in 1882

Antonín Dvořák composed over 200 works, most of which have survived. They include nine symphonies, ten operas, four concertos and numerous vocal, chamber and keyboard works. His most famous pieces of music include the Ninth Symphony (From the New World), the Cello Concerto, the American String Quartet, the Slavonic Dances, and the opera Rusalka.

This article constitutes a list of Dvořák's known works organized by their genre. They are in chronological order, referenced by Burghauser number.

== Symphonies ==
- Symphony No. 1 in C minor (The Bells of Zlonice), B. 9 (1865)
- Symphony No. 2 in B♭ major, B. 12 (1865)
- Symphony No. 3 in E♭ major, B. 34 (1873)
- Symphony No. 4 in D minor, B. 41 (1874)
- Symphony No. 5 in F major, B. 54 (1875)
- Symphony No. 6 in D major, B. 112 (1880)
- Symphony No. 7 in D minor, B. 141 (1884-1885)
- Symphony No. 8 in G major, B. 163 (1889)
- Symphony No. 9 in E minor (From the New World), B. 178 (1893)

== Orchestral works ==
- 7 Interludes, B. 15 (1867)
- 3 Nocturnes, B. 31 (1872; nos. 2 and 3 lost)
- Nocturne in B, B. 47 (1875)
- Serenade for Strings in E major, B. 52 (1875)
- Symphonic Variations, B. 70 (1877)
- Slavonic Dances
  - Series I: B. 83 (1878)
  - Series II: B. 147 (1887)
- 3 Slavonic Rhapsodies, B. 86 (1878)
- Festival March in C major, B. 88 (1879)
- Prague Waltzes in D major, B. 99 (1879)
- Polonaise in E♭ major, B. 100 (1879)
- Polka "For Prague Students" B. 114 (1880)
- Gallop in E major, B. 119 (1881)
- Legends, B. 122 (1881)
- Scherzo capriccioso, B. 131 (1883)

=== Overtures ===
- Tragic Overture, B. 16a (1870)
- Romeo and Juliet, B. 35 (1873; lost)
- My Home, B. 125a (1882)
- Hussite Overture, B. 132 (1883)
- In Nature's Realm, B. 168 (1891)
- Carnival Overture, B. 169 (1891)
- Othello Overture, B. 174 (1892)

=== Orchestral suites ===
- Czech Suite, B. 93 (1879)
- Suite in A major (American), B. 190 (1895)

=== Symphonic poems ===
- Symphonic Poem (Rhapsody) in A minor, B. 44 (1874)
- The Water Goblin, B. 195 (1896)
- The Noon Witch, B. 196 (1896)
- The Golden Spinning Wheel, B. 197 (1896)
- The Wild Dove, B. 198 (1896)
- A Hero's Song, B. 199 (1897)

== Concertante works ==
=== Cello and orchestra ===
- Cello Concerto in A major, B. 10 (1865)
- Cello Concerto in B minor, B. 191 (1894-1895)
- Rondo in G minor, B. 181 (1893)
- Silent Woods, B. 182 (1893)

=== Piano and orchestra ===
- Piano Concerto in G minor, B. 63 (1876)

=== Violin and orchestra ===
- Romance in F minor for violin and orchestra, B. 39 (1873)
- Mazurka in E minor, B. 90 (1879)
- Violin Concerto in A minor, B. 96/108 (1879/1880)

== Operas ==
- Alfred, B. 16 (1870)
- King and Charcoal Burner, B. 21/42/151 (1871/1874/1887)
- The Stubborn Lovers, B. 46 (1874)
- Vanda, B. 55 (1875)
- The Cunning Peasant, B. 67 (1877)
- Dimitrij, B. 127 (1881-1882)
- The Jacobin, B. 159/200 (1887-1888/1897)
- The Devil and Kate, B. 201 (1898-1899)
- Rusalka, B. 203 (1900)
- Armida, B. 206 (1902-1903)

== Vocal music ==
=== Choral music ===
==== Chorus and orchestra ====
- Mass in B♭ major, B. 2 (1837?; lost)
- Stabat Mater, B. 71 (1876-1877)
- The Heirs of the White Mountain, B. 102/134 (1880/1884)
- The Spectre's Bride, B. 135 (1884)
- Hymn of the Czech Peasants, B. 143 (1885)
- Saint Ludmilla, B. 144 (1885-1886)
- Mass in D major, B. 153/175 (1887/1892)
- Psalm 149, B. 154 (1887)
- Requiem, B. 165 (1890)
- Te Deum, B. 176 (1892)
- The American Flag, B. 177 (1892-1893)
- Festival Song, B. 202 (1900)
- Old Folks at Home, B. 605 (1894)

==== Mixed chorus ====
- The Heirs of the White Mountain, B. 27 (1872)
- 4 Choruses, B. 59 (1876)
- In Nature's Realm, B. 126 (1882)

==== Male chorus ====
- 3 Choral Songs, B. 66 (1877)
- Bouquet of Czech Folksongs, B. 72 (1877)
- Song of a Czech, B. 73 (1877)
- From a Bouquet of Slavonic Folksongs, B.76 (1877-1878)
- 5 Choruses, B. 87 (1878)
- Psalm 149, B. 91 (1879)
- 2 Irish Songs, B. 601 (1878)

==== Female chorus ====
- Moravian Duets, B. 107 (1880)

=== Voice and piano ===
- Cypresses, B. 11 (1865)
- 2 Songs, B. 13 (1865)
- Songs on Words by Eliška Krásnohorská, B. 23 (1871)
- The Orphan, B. 24 (1871)
- Rosmarine, B. 24bis (1871)
- 4 Songs on Serbian Folk Poems, B. 29 (1872)
- Songs from the "Dvůr Králové" Manuscript ("Queen's Court"), B. 30 (1872)
- Evening Songs, B. 61a/b (1876)
- Ave Maria, B. 68 (1877)
- 3 Modern Greek Songs, B. 84b (1878)
- Gypsy Songs, B. 104 (1880)
- The Wild Duck, B. 140 (1884; lost)
- 2 Czech Folk Poems, B. 142 (1885)
- In Folk Tone, B. 146 (1886)
- 4 Songs on Poems by O. Malybrok-Stieler, B. 157 (1887-1888)
- Biblical Songs, B. 185 (1894)
- Lullaby, B. 194 (1895)
- Song of the Smith of Lešetín, B. 204 (1901)

=== Voice and organ ===
- Hymnus ad laudes in festo Sanctae Trinitatis, B. 82 (1878)
- Ave maris stella, B. 95a (1879)
- O sanctissima dulcis virgo Maria!, B. 95b (1879)

=== Other ===
- Moravian Duets, B. 50, 60, 62, 69
- Children's Song for two voices unaccompanied, B. 113 (1880)

== Chamber music ==
=== String quartets ===
- String Quartet No. 1 in A major, B. 8 (1862)
- String Quartet No. 2 in B♭ major, B. 17 (1869)
- String Quartet No. 3 in D major, B. 18 (1869)
- String Quartet No. 4 in E minor, B. 19 (1870)
- String Quartet No. 5 in F minor, B. 37 (1873)
- String Quartet No. 6 in A minor, B. 40 (1873)
- String Quartet No. 7 in A minor, B. 45 (1874)
- String Quartet No. 8 in E major, B. 57 (1876)
- String Quartet No. 9 in D minor, B. 75 (1877)
- String Quartet No. 10 in E♭ major (Slavonic), B. 92 (1878–79)
- String Quartet No. 11 in C major, B. 121 (1881)
- String Quartet No. 12 in F major (American), B. 179 (1893)
- String Quartet No. 13 in G major, B. 192 (1895)
- String Quartet No. 14 in A♭ major, B. 193 (1895)

==== String quartet movements ====
- String quartet movement in F major, B. 120 (1881)
- Cypresses, B. 152 (1887)
- Andante appassionato in F major, B. 40a (1873)
- 2 Waltzes in A and D major, B. 105 (1880)

=== String quintets ===
- String Quintet No. 1 in A minor, B. 7 (1861)
- String Quintet No. 2 in G major, B. 49 (1875)
- String Quintet No. 3 in E♭ major (American), B. 180 (1893)

=== Piano trios ===
- 2 Piano Trios, B. 25/26 (1871–1872; destroyed)
- Piano Trio No. 1 in B♭ major, B. 51 (1875)
- Piano Trio No. 2 in G minor, B. 56 (1876)
- Piano Trio No. 3 in F minor, B. 130 (1883)
- Piano Trio No. 4 in E minor (Dumky), B. 166 (1890-1891)

=== Piano quartets ===
- Piano Quartet No. 1 in D major, B. 53 (1875)
- Piano Quartet No. 2 in E♭ major, B. 162 (1889)

=== Piano quintets ===
- Piano Quintet No. 1 in A major, B. 28 (1872)
- Piano Quintet No. 2 in A major, B. 155 (1887)

=== Violin and piano ===
- Sonata in A minor, B. 33 (1873; lost)
- Romance in F minor, B. 38 (1873)
- Nocturne in B major, B. 48a (1883)
- Capriccio in C major, B. 81 (1878)
- Mazurka in E minor, B. 89 (1879)
- Sonata in F major, B. 106 (1880)
- Ballade in D minor, B. 139 (1884)
- Romantic Pieces, B. 150 (1887)
- Sonatina in G major, B. 183 (1893)
- Slavonic Dance No. 2 in E minor, B. 170 (1891)

=== Cello and piano ===
- Sonata in F minor, B. 20 (1871; whereabouts unknown)
- Polonaise in A major, B. 94 (1879)
- Rondo in G minor, B. 171 (1891)
- Silent Woods, B. 173 (1891)
- Slavonic Dance Nos. 3 and 8, B. 172 (1891)

=== Other ===
- Clarinet Quintet in B♭ major, B. 14 (lost)
- Serenade for flute, violin, viola and triangle, B. 15bis (1867)
- Octet for piano, two violins, viola, double bass, clarinet, bassoon and horn (1873; lost)
- Serenade in D minor for Wind Instruments, B. 77 (1878)
- Bagatelles for two violins, cello and harmonium or piano, B. 79 (1878)
- String Sextet in A major, B. 80 (1878)
- Terzetto in C for two violins and viola, B. 148 (1887)
- Drobnosti for two violins and viola, B. 149 (1887)
- Gavotte in G minor for three violins, B. 164 (1890)
- Fanfares in C major for 4 trumpets and timpani, B. 167 (1891)

== Keyboard music ==
=== Solo piano ===
- Forget-me-not Polka in C major, B. 1 (1854)
- Per Pedes Polka, B. 2bis (1859)
- Polka in E major, B. 3 (1860)
- Potpourri on King and Charcoal Burner , B. 22/43 (1871-1875)
- Silhouettes, B. 32/98 (1872/1879)
- 2 Minuets, B. 58 (1876)
- Dumka in D minor, B. 64 (1876)
- Theme and Variations in A♭ major, B. 65 (1876)
- Scottish Dances, B. 74 (1877)
- 2 Furiants, B. 85 (1878)
- 8 Waltzes, B. 101 (1879-1880)
- 4 Eclogues, B. 103 (1880)
- 4 Album Leaves, B. 109 (1880)
- 6 Piano Pieces, B. 110 (1880)
- 6 Mazurkas, B. 111 (1880)
- Moderato in A major, B. 116 (1881)
- Question in G minor, B. 128bis (1882)
- Impromptu in D minor, B. 129 (1883)
- Dumka in C minor, B. 136 (1884)
- Furiant in G minor, B. 137 (1884)
- Humoresque in F♯ major, B. 138 (1884-1892)
- 2 Little Pearls, B. 156 (1887)
- Album Leaf in E♭ major, B. 158 (1888)
- 13 Poetic Tone Poems, B. 161 (1889)
- Suite in A major (American), B. 184 (1894)
- Humoresques, B. 187 (1894)
- 2 Piano Pieces in G major and G minor, B. 188 (1894)

=== Piano four hands ===
- Nocturne, B. 48b (1882)
- Slavonic Dances
  - Series I: B. 78 (1878)
  - Series II: B. 145 (1886)
- Legends, B. 117 (1881)
- From the Bohemian Forest, B. 133 (1883-1884)

=== Organ ===
- 8 Preludes and Fugues, B. 302 (1859)

== See also ==
- List of compositions by Antonín Dvořák
