= 1883 in music =

Events in the year 1883 in music.

== Specific locations ==
- 1883 in Norwegian music

== Events ==
- October 22 – Opening of the first Metropolitan Opera House.
- Friedrich Kiel is involved in a traffic accident from which he never completely recovers.
- The Gretsch Company, manufacturers of drums, banjos and guitars, opens in Brooklyn, N.Y.

== Published popular music ==
- "A Boy's Best Friend Is His Mother" w. Henry Miller m. Joseph P. Skelly
- "The Farmer in the Dell" trad
- "I Know Whom I Have Believed" w. Daniel W. Whittle m. James McGranahan
- "La golondrina" m. Narciso Serradell Sevilla
- "Polly Wolly Doodle (All The Day)" trad
- "Ring Dem Heavenly Bells" by Sam Lucas
- "She Does the Fandango All Over the Place" w.m. G. W. Hunt
- "There Is a Tavern in the Town" anon
- "Transit of Venus March" m. John Philip Sousa
- "Must we leave the old home, mother?" w. by Arthur W. French, m. by William A Huntley

== Classical music ==
- Isaac Albéniz – Barcarola for piano No. 1
- Anton Arensky
  - Piano Concerto in F minor, Op. 2
  - Symphony No. 1 in B minor
- Johannes Brahms – Symphony No. 3
- Emmanuel Chabrier – España, rapsodie pour orchestre
- George Whitefield Chadwick – Thalia (concert overture)
- Antonín Dvořák
  - Piano Trio No. 3, Op. 65 (B. 130)
  - Scherzo capriccioso, Op. 66 (B. 131)
  - Hussite Overture, Op. 67 (B. 132)
- Cesar Franck – Le chasseur maudit
- Benjamin Godard – Piano Trio No.2, Op.72
- Charles Gounod – The Redemption (oratorio)
- Augusta Mary Ann Holmès – Pologne
- Hans Huber – Piano Trio No.2, Op.65
- Franz Liszt – La lugubre gondola (possible date of early version)
- Emilie Mayer – Notturno, Op.48
- Max Meyer-Olbersleben – Fantaisie-Sonate, Op.17
- David Popper – Im Walde Suite, Op.50
- Pablo de Sarasate – Carmen Fantasy
- Sergei Taneyev – Canzona for Clarinet and Strings in F minor
- Peter Tchaikovsky - Orchestral Suite No. 2
- Emil Waldteufel –Estudiantina

== Opera ==
- Alfredo Catalani – Dejanice
- César Cui – Prisoner of the Caucasus
- Charles-Édouard Lefebvre – Le Trésor premiered in Angers
- Miguel Marqués – La cruz de fuego
- Karel Miry – De kleine patriot (opera in 4 acts, libretto by J. Hoste, premiered on December 23 in Brussels)

== Musical theater ==
- Cordelia's Aspirations (Edward Harrigan & David Braham) Broadway production opened at the New Theatre Comique on November 5 and ran for 176 performances
- Johann Strauss II – Eine Nacht in Venedig (A Night In Venice) Berlin and Vienna productions

== Births ==
- January 1 – Floy Little Bartlett, American composer (d. 1956)
- January 30 – Peeter Süda, Estonian organist and composer (d. 1920)
- February 11 – Paul von Klenau, Danish-born composer (d. 1946)
- March 10 – Maria Barrientos, Spanish operatic soprano (d. 1946)
- March 15 - Ford Dabney, American composer and vaudevillian (d. 1953)
- March 16 – Ernie Hare, U.S. bass/baritone (d. 1939)
- March 19 – Josef Matthias Hauer, Austrian composer and theorist (d. 1959)
- March 21 – Jules Van Nuffel, Belgian composer and choir conductor (d. 1953)
- March 27 – Dimitrios Semsis, Greek violinist (d. 1950)
- March 28 – William Henry Harris, English organist, choral trainer and composer (d. 1973)
- April 1 – Malcolm McEachern, Australian-born concert bass singer (d. 1945)
- April 6 – Vernon Dalhart, U.S. singer
- April 13 (O.S. April 1) – Alexander Vasilyevich Alexandrov, Russian Soviet composer
- May 4 – Nikolai Malko, Ukrainian conductor
- May 5 – Petar Konjović, composer (d. 1970)
- May 28
  - George Dyson, English musician and composer (d. 1964)
  - Václav Talich, Czech conductor
  - Riccardo Zandonai, opera composer (d. 1944)
- June 16 – Fritz Krauss, German tenor (d. 1976)
- July 7 – Toivo Kuula, Finnish conductor and composer
- July 25 – Alfredo Casella, composer (d. 1947)
- July 29 – Manuel Infante, pianist and composer (d. 1958)
- August 13 – Joseph C. Smith, American dance band leader (d. 1965)
- August 15 – Benjamin M. Kaye, librettist (died 1970)
- August 19 – Emilius Bangert, Danish composer and organist (d. 1962)
- September 18 – Gerald Tyrwhitt-Wilson, 14th Baron Berners, British composer
- October 2 – Frico Kafenda, Slovak composer
- October 22 – Victor Jacobi, operetta composer (d. 1921)
- November 8 – Arnold Bax, English composer (d. 1953)
- December 3 – Anton Webern, Austrian composer (d. 1945)
- December 22 – Edgard Varèse, French(-born) composer (d. 1965)

== Deaths ==
- January 24 – Friedrich von Flotow, composer (b. 1812)
- February 13 – Richard Wagner, German composer (b. 1813)
- February 17 – Napoléon Coste, guitarist and composer (b. 1805)
- April 10 – Emilie Mayer, composer (b. 1812)
- April 26 – Napoleon Orda, pianist, composer and artist (b. 1807)
- June 6
  - Ciprian Porumbescu, composer (b. 1853)
  - Per Lasson, composer (b. 1859)
- June 10 – Karl Graedener, cellist, singing teacher and composer (b. 1812)
- July 14 – Svend Grundtvig, Danish folk song collector (b. 1824)
- July 27 – Franz Doppler, flute virtuoso and composer (b. 1821)
- September 2 – Léon Halévy, librettist (born 1802)
- October 4 – Giovanni Guicciardi, Italian opera singer (b. 1819)
- October 30 – Robert Volkmann, composer (b. 1815)
- December 7 – Auguste Offenbach, composer (born 1862)
- December 3 – Gustav Hölzel, operatic bass-baritone (b. 1813)
- December 11 – Mario, operatic tenor (b. 1810)
- date unknown – Enrico Ceruti, violin maker (b. 1806)
