= Quartettsatz =

Quartettsatz (German for quartet movement) can refer to these compositions:

- Quartettsatz, D 103 (Schubert) (1814) in C minor, only surviving, but incomplete, movement of a string quartet by Franz Schubert
- Quartettsatz, D 703 (Schubert) (1820) in C minor, first movement of Franz Schubert's uncompleted Twelfth String Quartet
- Quartettsatz (Dvořák) (1881) in F major, only movement of a never-completed quartet for the Hellmesberger Quartet
