= Dvořák in Prague: A Celebration =

- Kultur Video DVD, D4211
- Genre: Classical music
- Directed by: Brian Large
- Starring: Rudolf Firkušný; Yo-Yo Ma; Seiji Ozawa; Itzhak Perlman; Frederica von Stade
- Country of origin: Czech Republic
- Original language: Czech

Production
- Executive producer: Peter Gelb
- Producers: Pat Jaffe; Helmut Rost; Radim Smetana
- Editor: Joachim Meissner
- Running time: 89 minutes
- Production company: Sony Classical

Original release
- Network: AVRO, Czech Television, PBS and ZDF
- Release: 16 December 1993

Dvořák in Prague: A Celebration was an 89-minute televised concert presented in Prague's Smetana Hall on 16 December 1993, in which thirteen pieces of music by Antonin Dvořák were performed by the pianist Rudolf Firkušný, the cellist Yo-Yo Ma, the violinist Itzhak Perlman, the mezzo-soprano Frederica von Stade, the Prague Philharmonic Chorus and the Boston Symphony Orchestra under the direction of Seiji Ozawa. It was produced by Sony Classical Film and Video, Czech Television and Germany's Zweites Deutsches Fernsehen in association with Pragokoncert, the Netherlands' Algemene Vereniging Radio Omroep and the United States' Public Broadcasting Service and MJI Broadcasting, and was released on Laserdisc, VHS video cassette, CD and audio cassette by Sony Classical Records and on DVD by Kultur Video.

== Background ==
Prague's Obecní dům, the Municipal House, which contains Smetana Hall

On 16 December 1893, the New York Philharmonic, which had commissioned the work, premiered Dvořák's Symphony No. 9 in Carnegie Hall under the direction of Anton Seidl. Exactly one hundred years later, that event was commemorated in a concert mounted in Prague's Smetana Hall, an art nouveau building erected between 1906 and 1911 and named in honour of Bedřich Smetana, the Czech composer popularly regarded in the Czech Republic as the father of the nation's music. The concert was staged in the presence of the republic's first president, Václav Havel. It included Itzhak Perlman's first performance in Prague, and was the first occasion on which the Boston Symphony Orchestra was heard there since 1956.

The Carnival Overture that opened the gala, although published as an independent work, is the central piece in a trilogy of concert overtures that Dvořák entitled "Nature, life and love". The first in the cycle is V přírodě ("In nature's realm", Op. 91, B. 168, 1891), and the third is Othello (Op. 93, B. 174, 1892).

The Romance in F minor was written at the request of Josef Markus, first violin of the orchestra of Prague's Provisional Theatre, for a concert that the orchestra gave under the direction of Adolf Čech at the Žofín Palace on 9 December 1877. It was adapted by Dvořák from a string quartet that he had composed four years previously, but which remained unpublished until after his death.

Silent Woods originated in a cycle of five piano pieces, From the Bohemian forest, that Dvořák composed in 1883 at the request of Fritz Simrock, the German who published most of his works. After a version of the fifth part that Dvořák arranged for cello and piano in 1891 was received enthusiastically, he composed an orchestral version of it in 1893. It was Simrock who changed Dvořák's title from Die Ruhe (German for the Czech "Klid", meaning "Silence") to Waldesruhe ("Wood-silence").

The Humoresques began as fragmentary ideas that Dvořák jotted down in notebooks while director of the National Conservatory of Music of America in 1892-1895. He worked them up into a piano cycle while holidaying in Bohemia in 1894. The seventh humoresque's transcription for violin, cello and orchestra that was heard during the gala was commissioned from the Czech-Canadian composer Oskar Morawetz at Yo-Yo Ma's suggestion.

The Symphony No. 9, another fruit of Dvořák's time in charge of the National Conservatory of Music of America, was inspired by African-American and Native American music. He wrote that he regarded its second movement as a "sketch or study for a later work, either a cantata or opera ... which will be based on Longfellow's Hiawatha".

Rusalka is about a water-spirit who falls in love with a human Prince who passes by her lake while hunting. In her "Song to the moon", she pleads with "the pilgrim of the starry vault" to tell the Prince about her feelings for him.

Dvořák's setting of Psalm 149 was one of a number of works in which he expressed his profound religious sentiments. His Christian œuvre includes a Mass in D major, a Requiem, a Stabat Mater, a Te Deum and an oratorio, Svatá Ludmila ("Saint Ludmila").

The Gypsy Songs include "Songs my mother taught me", a piece frequently recorded in instrumental arrangements as well as by vocalists. A singing translation of its text is: "Songs my mother taught me, In the days long vanished; Seldom from her eyelids were the teardrops banished. Now I teach my children each melodious measure, Oft the tears are flowing, oft they flow from my memory's treasure".

"Dumky", the subtitle of the Piano Trio No. 4, is the plural of the Ukrainian word "dumka", a musical term which is a diminutive form of the word "duma" (plural "dumy") that Ukrainians use for their epic folk ballads. Dumky are characterized by alternating cheerfulness and gloom.

Inspired by Johannes Brahms's Hungarian Dances and the rhythms of traditional Bohemian folk dances, the Slavonic Dances were originally piano pieces. Both of those performed in the gala were presented in transcriptions, one for violin, cello and orchestra by Oskar Morawetz and one for orchestra by Dvořák himself. Dvořák was asked to orchestrate his dances by his publisher in order that they "should sound like the very devil".

== DVD chapter listing ==
Antonin Dvořák (1841-1904)

- 1 (2:02) Opening credits, over footage of Prague in winter
- 2 (10:22) Karneval, koncertni ouvertura ("Carnival, a concert overture", Op. 92, B. 169, 1891), with the Boston Symphony Orchestra conducted by Seiji Ozawa
- 3 (12:17) Romance f moll pro housle a orchestr ("Romance in F minor for violin and orchestra", Op. 11, B. 39, Prague, 1877), arranged by Dvořák from the second movement, Andante con moto quasi allegretto, of his Smyčcový kvartet č. 5 f moll ("String quartet No. 5 in F minor", Op. 9, B. 37, Prague, 1873), with Itzhak Perlman and the Boston Symphony Orchestra, conducted by Seiji Ozawa
- 4 (7:32) Klid ("Silence", also known as "Silent woods", for cello and orchestra, B. 182, 1893), transcribed by Dvořák from the fifth part of his Ze Šumavy ("From the Bohemian forest", for piano four hands, Op. 68, B. 133, 1883), with Yo-Yo Ma and the Boston Symphony Orchestra, conducted by Seiji Ozawa
- 5 (4:33) Humoresky ("Humoresques" for piano, Op. 101, B. 187, 1894): No. 7 in G-flat major, Poco lento e grazioso, transcribed for violin, cello and orchestra by Oskar Morawetz (1917–2007), with Itzhak Perlman, Yo-Yo Ma and the Boston Symphony Orchestra, conducted by Seiji Ozawa
- 6 (12:50) Symfonie č. 9 e moll, „Z nového světa" ("Symphony No. 9 in E minor, 'From the new world'", Op. 95, B. 178, New York City, 1893): II: Largo, with the Boston Symphony Orchestra, conducted by Seiji Ozawa
- 7 (7:20) Rusalka ("The water spirit", Op. 114, B. 203, Prague, 1901), with a libretto by Jaroslav Kvapil (1868-1950) after Undine (1811) by Friedrich de la Motte Fouqué (1777-1843), Den lille havfreu ("The little mermaid", 1837) by Hans Christian Andersen (1805–1875) and the north-west European folk tradition of the Melusine: Act 1: Rusalka's song to the moon: „Měsíčku na nebi hlubokém" ("O moon high up in the deep sky"), with Frederica von Stade and the Boston Symphony Orchestra, conducted by Seiji Ozawa
- 8 (10:01) Žalm č. 149 ("Psalm 149", "Praise ye the Lord, Sing unto the Lord a new song", cantata for mixed chorus and orchestra, Op. 79, B. 154, 1887), with a text from the Book of Psalms in the Old Testament, with the Prague Philharmonic Chorus and the Boston Symphony Orchestra, conducted by Seiji Ozawa
- 9 (2:43) Humoresky ("Humoresques" for piano, Op. 101, B. 187, 1894): No. 1 in E-flat minor, Vivace, with Rudolf Firkušný
- 10 (4:17) Cigánské melodie ("Gypsy songs" for voice and piano, Op. 55, B. 104, 1880), with texts by Adolf Heyduk (1835-1923): No. 4, „Když mne stará matka zpívat učivala" ("Songs my mother taught me") and No. 5, „Struna naladěna" ("Tune your strings"), with Frederica von Stade and Rudolf Firkušný
- 11 (4:45) Klavírní trio č. 4 e moll, „Dumky" ("Piano trio No. 4 in E minor, 'Dumky'", Op. 90, B. 166, 1890-1891): Dumka No. 5, Allegro, with Itzhak Perlman, Yo-Yo Ma and Rudolf Firkušný
- 12 (5:25) Slovanské tance ("Slavonic dances" for orchestra, Op. 72, B. 147, 1886): No. 2 in E minor, „Starodávný" ("The ancient one"), transcribed for violin, cello and orchestra by Oskar Morawetz, with Yitzhak Perlman, Yo-Yo Ma and the Boston Symphony Orchestra, conducted by Seiji Ozawa
- 13 (4:09) Slovanské tance ("Slavonic dances" for orchestra, Op. 72, B. 147, 1886): No. 7 in C major, „Kolo" ("The circle"), with the Boston Symphony Orchestra, conducted by Seiji Ozawa
- 14 (1:38) Closing credits

== Personnel ==
=== Artists ===
- Rudolf Firkušný (1912–1994), piano
- Yo-Yo Ma (b. 1955), cello
- Yitzhak Perlman (b. 1945), violin
- Frederica von Stade (b. 1945), mezzo-soprano
- Prague Philharmonic Chorus
- Pavel Kühn, choral director
- Boston Symphony Orchestra
- Seiji Ozawa (1935–2024), conductor

=== Other ===
- Peter Gelb (b. 1953), executive producer
- Brian Large (b. 1939), director
- Pat Jaffe, producer, Sony
- Helmut Rost, producer, ZDF
- Radim Smetana, producer, Czech TV
- Laura Mitgang, coordinating producer
- Jiří Paulu, Czech coordinator
- Thomas Frost, audio producer
- David Kneuss, stage director
- Joan Hershey, associate producer
- Monika Fröhlich, associate director
- Priscilla Hoadley, vision mixer
- Christian Constantinov, balance engineer
- Timothy Wood, sound engineer
- Richard King, sound engineer
- Michael Deegan, set
- Paul King, set
- Mia Bongiovanni, production assistant
- Ashley Hoppin, production assistant
- Gary Bradley, editor, opening segment
- Jan Malíř, camera operator, opening segment
- Fritz Buttenstedt, production consultant
- Job Maarse, production consultant
- Udo Feill, editing consultant
- David Grayson, music consultant
- Steven Sobol, TV distribution executive
- Dietrich Pröhl, production manager
- Kurt-Oskar Herting, lead camera operator
- Christian Behrendt, camera operator
- Wolf-Dieter Bergmann, camera operator
- Klaus-Uwe Flade, camera operator
- Klaus Gebhard, camera operator
- Beate Häring, camera operator
- Rudolf Junge, camera operator
- Axel Leist, camera operator
- Siegfried Ruster, camera operator
- Manfred Schebsdat, camera operator
- Franz-Josef Stark, camera operator
- Martin Strauss, camera operator
- Reinhard Reiser, sound engineer
- Eugen Möllecken, technical supervisor
- Joachim Meissner, video editor
- Günter Wingenter, video technician
- Walter Burbach, technical lighting
- Klaus Hirschelmann, technical lighting
- Manfred Tolksdorf, technical lighting
- Monika Böhm, floor manager
- Rolf Herrmann, production assistant
- Jiřina Bílá, production supervisor
- Alena Kratochvílová, production assistant
- Petr Paur, lighting
- Zdenĕk Polesný, lighting
- Zdenĕk Hovarka, lighting
- Svatava Součková, set
- Dagmar Švecová, hair and make-up
- Denisa Němcová, hair and make-up
- Jana Fořtová, producer
- Jindrick Pitter, direction, Smetana Hall

== Critical reception ==
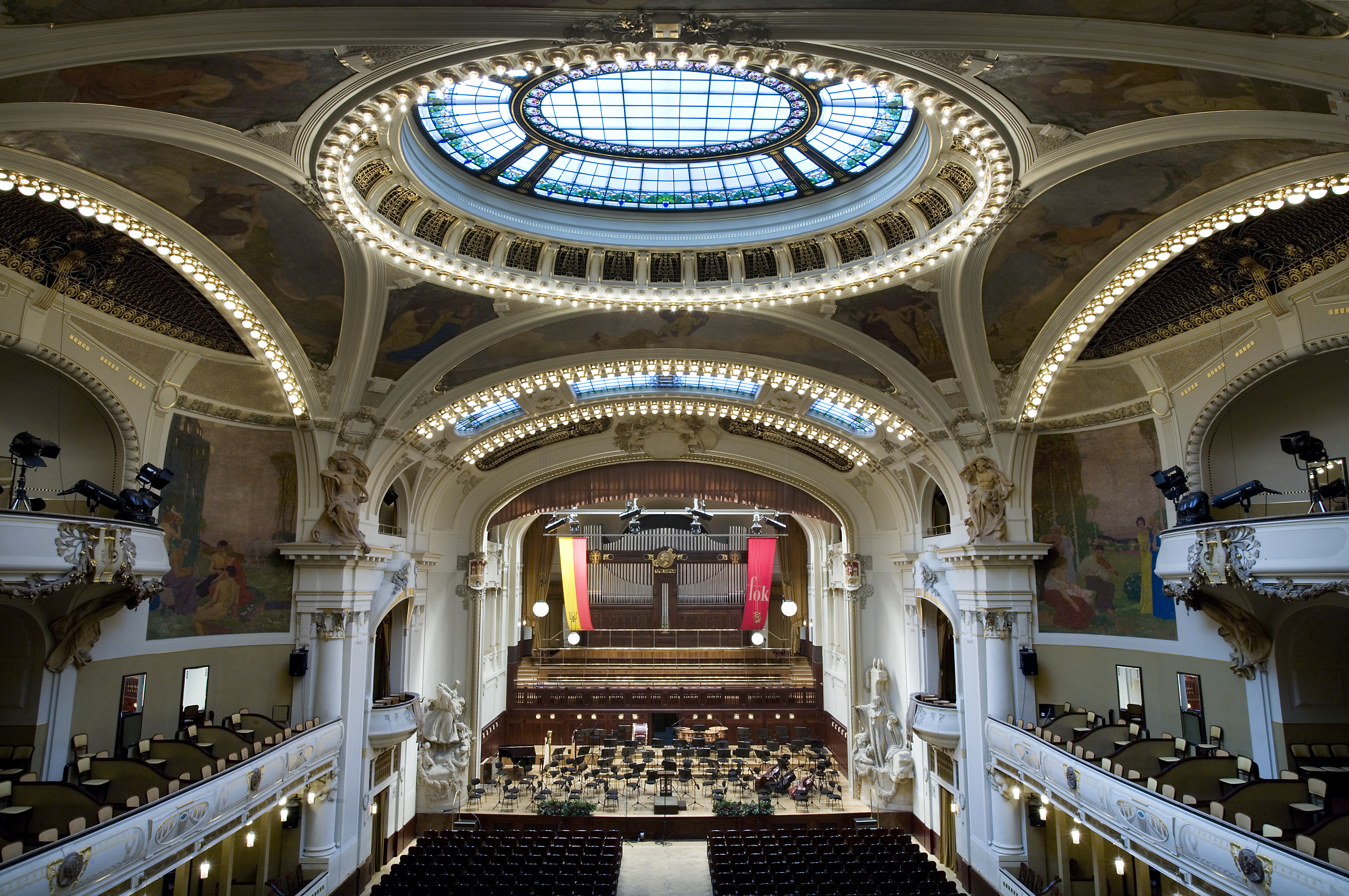
The Smetana Hall

Herbert Glass reviewed a PBS telecast of the concert in the Los Angeles Times on 18 March 1994. It was to the gala's credit, he wrote, that it eschewed "the usual talky, self-congratulatory promo" in favour of a programme of unadulterated music. Not a word was spoken during the performance, not even to mention the event that it commemorated, the premiere of Dvořák's "New World" symphony in New York City exactly one hundred years previously.

The producers of the concert did not seem to trust their public to enjoy Dvořák's music, easy to appreciate it though it was, without adapting at least some of it. For example, a Humoresque for solo piano was changed into a piece for violin, cello and orchestra, presumably in order to create an opportunity for Itzhak Perlman and Yo-Yo Ma to play a duet together. It was odd, too, that the Largo from the "New World" symphony was played over the opening credits of the gala as well as in the body of it.

The audience in Smetana Hall (including the president of the Czech Republic, Václav Havel) were allowed to hear at least some of Dvořák's music precisely as he had written it. His Romance in F was "poignantly" delivered by Itzhak Perlman, and Yo-Yo Ma played Silent Woods "with a stunning, seamless legato, a vibrato measurable on the Richter Scale and his patented facial choreography".

Dvořák's vocal œuvre was represented by the "lusty" Prague Philharmonic Chorus in a "majestic" setting of Psalm 149, and by Frederica von Stade, who "nearly [stole] the show with her radiant delivery of Rusalka's "Song to the Moon", in which Ozawa and the [Boston Symphony Orchestra proved] the most sensitive accompanists". Von Stade also sang two of Dvořák's Gypsy Songs, partnered at the piano by the octogenarian Czech Rudolf Firkušný.

Thomas Frost and his audio team deserved praise for "creating an exceptionally handsome-sounding classical music video".

The concert was also discussed in Billboard, Classical Music Magazine, Fanfare, Krasnogruda, New York, The New Yorker, The New York Times and The Washington Post.

== Broadcast and home media history ==
The concert was broadcast live on television in the Czech Republic, and subsequently televised in thirty other countries. It was aired in the United States by PBS in March 1994.

Also in 1994, Sony released the gala as a CLV (constant linear velocity) Laserdisc (catalogue number SLV-53488) and a VHS video cassette (catalogue number SHV-53488), with 4:3 NTSC colour video and stereo audio. In the same year, Sony released the concert as a CD (catalogue number SK-46687) and audio cassette (catalogue number ST-46687) which include all the gala's music except for the excerpt from Dvořák's Symphony No. 9. The CD provides stereo audio derived from a 20-bit master recording, and includes a 12-page booklet with two production photographs and notes by Ileene Smith. In 2007, Kultur Video issued the gala on a DVD (catalogue number D4211) with 4:3 NTSC colour video and compressed Dolby Digital stereo audio.

== Gallery ==
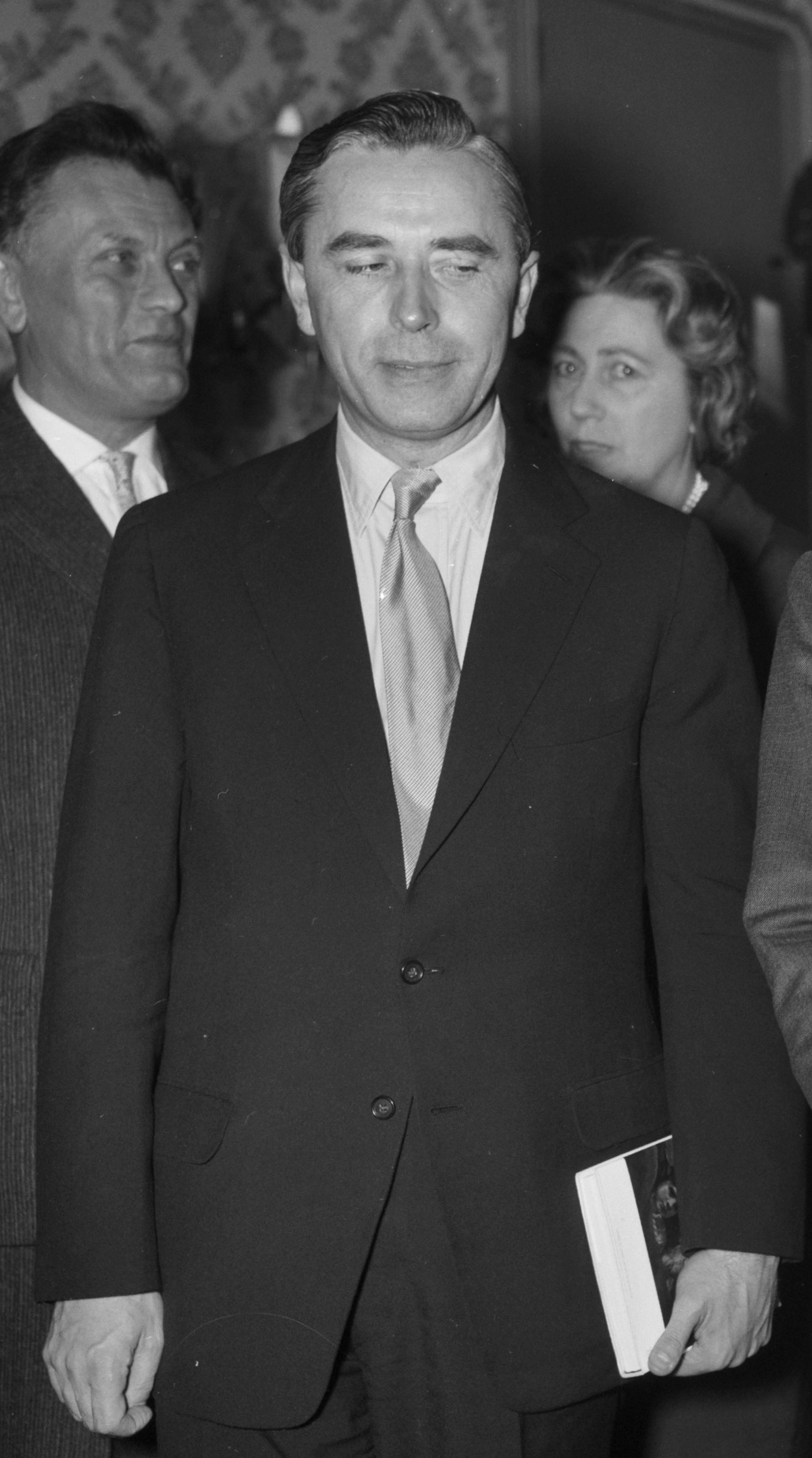
Rudolf Firkušný

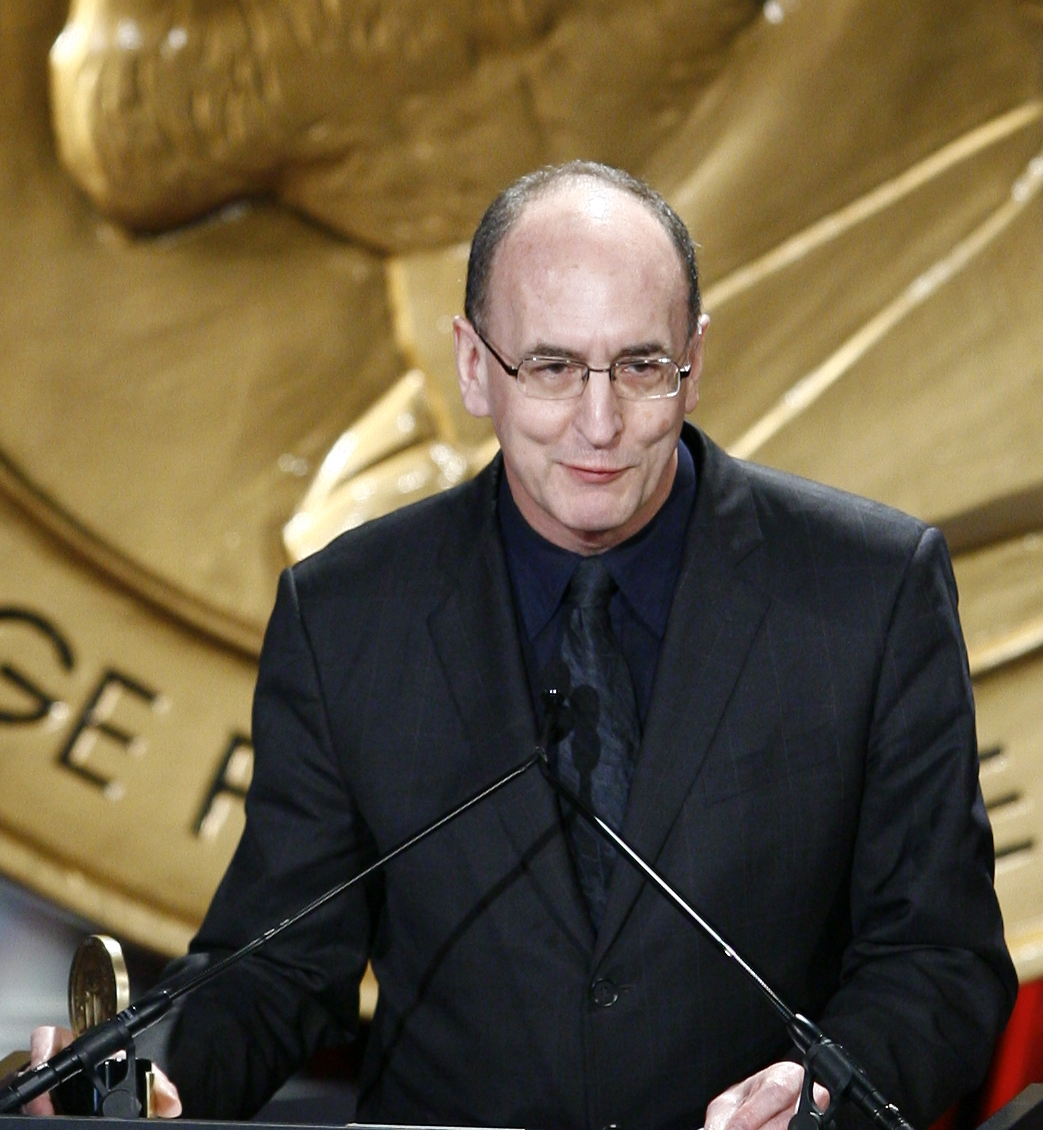
Peter Gelb

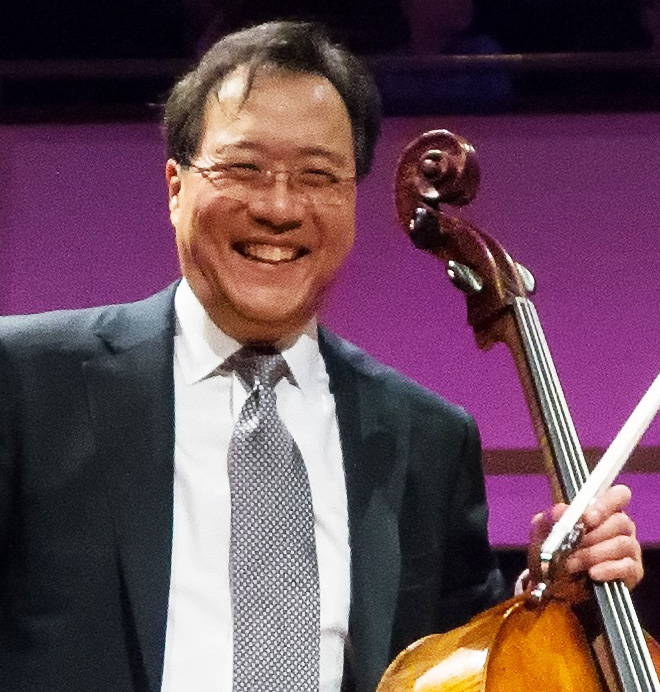
Yo-Yo Ma

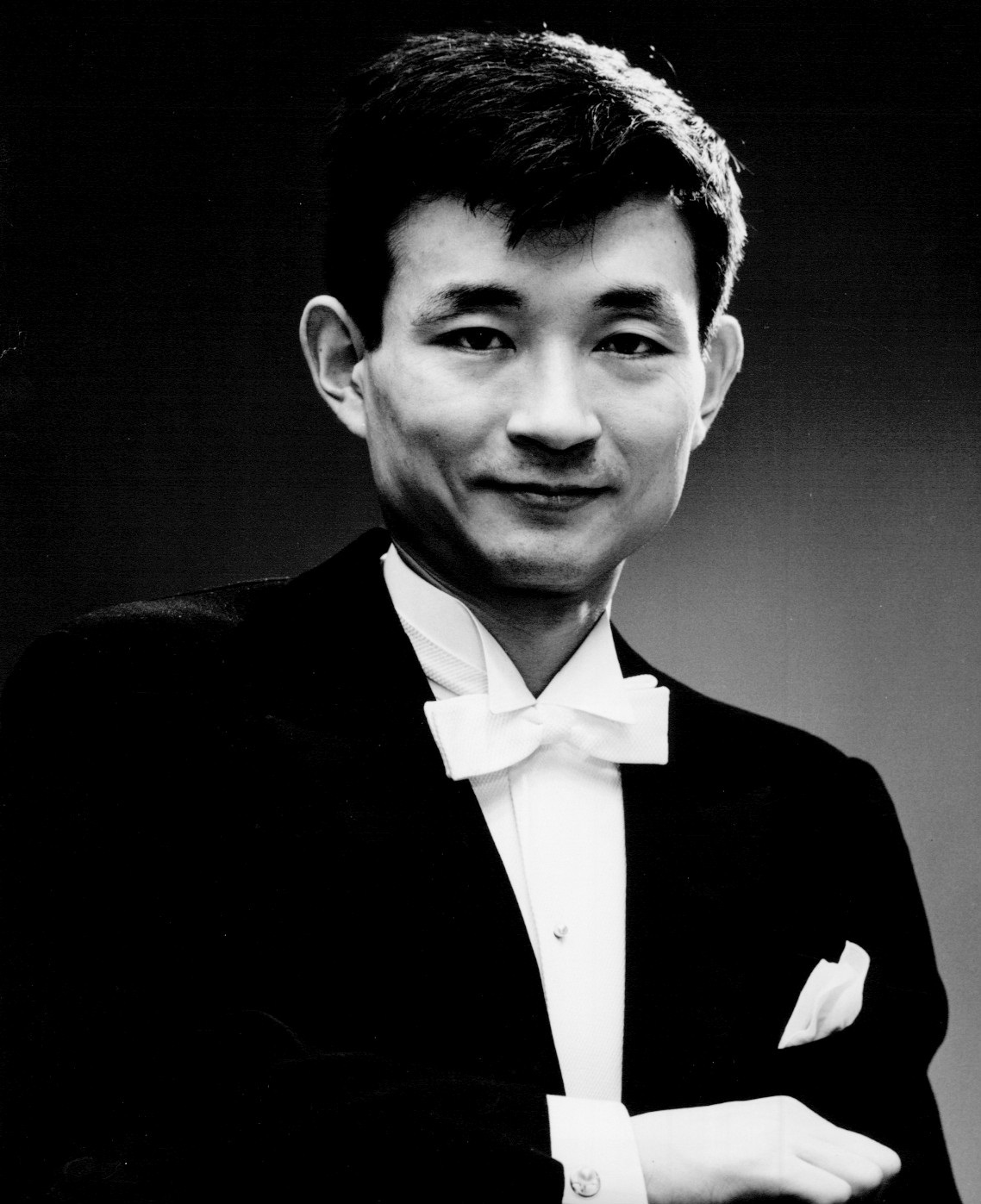
Seiji Ozawa

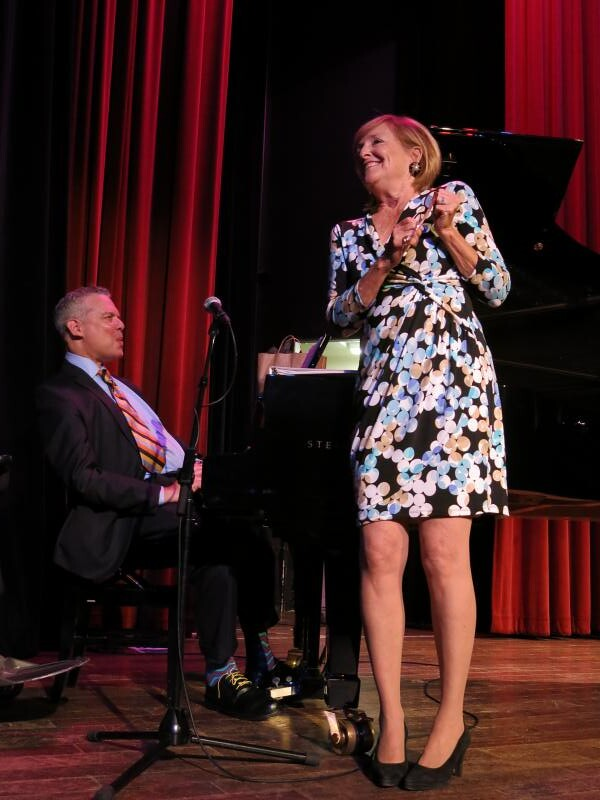
Frederica von Stade
