= Romance in F minor (Dvořák) =

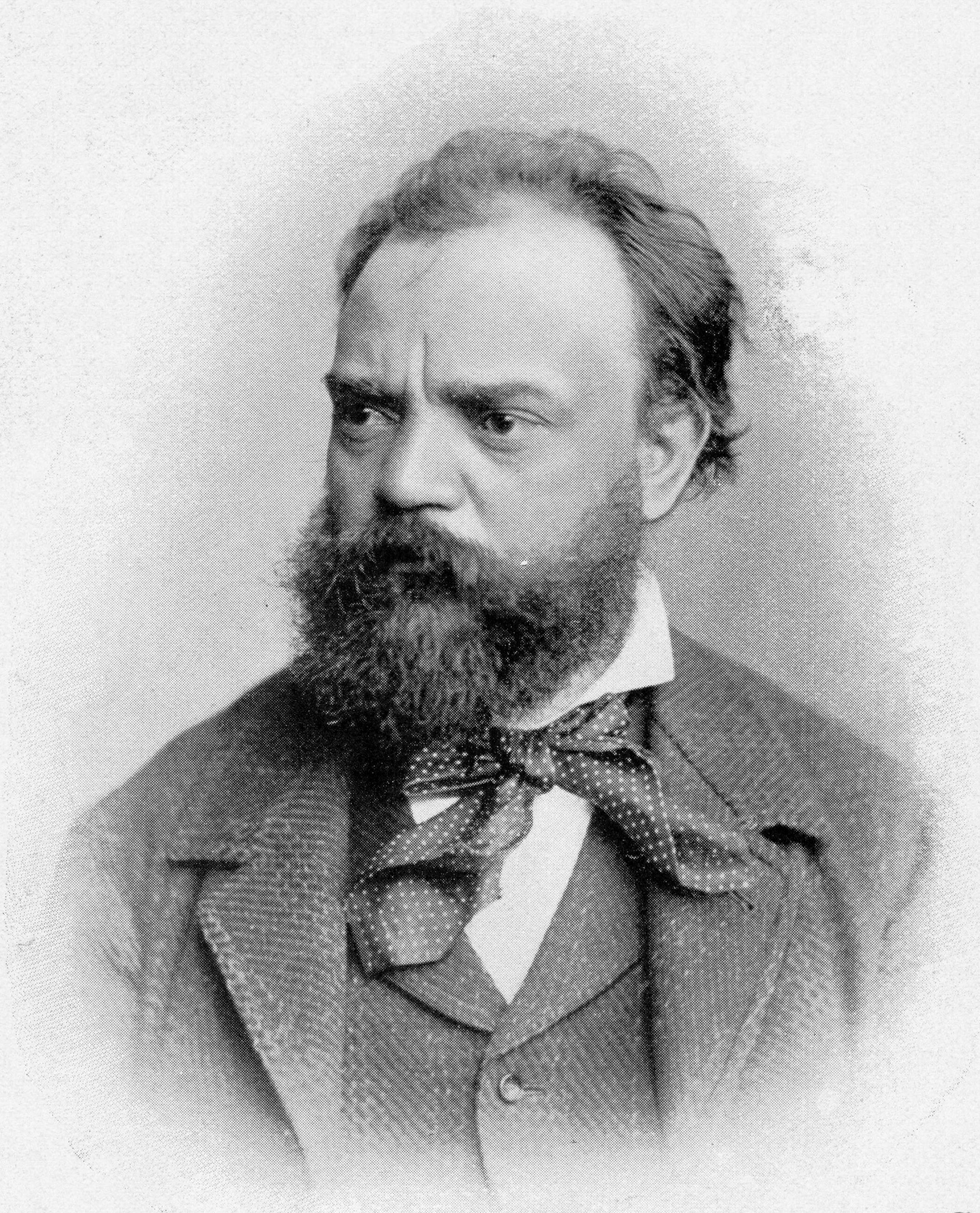
Antonín Dvořák in 1882

The Romance in F minor, Op. 11, (B. 39) is a single-movement work for violin and orchestra by Antonín Dvořák, published in 1879.

== History ==
It was written at the request of Josef Markus, leader of the Provisional Theatre Orchestra in Prague; he would play it at the annual concert of the orchestra at Žofín Palace. It was first performed at the concert, conducted by Adolf Čech, on 9 December 1877.

Dvořák based the work on the slow movement, marked Andante con moto quasi allegretto, of his String Quartet No. 5 in F minor. This quartet was composed in 1873 when the composer was not widely known; it was unperformed and unpublished in his lifetime.

Dvořák wrote a version of the Romance in F minor with piano accompaniment, dedicated to the violinist František Ondříček, which was not published in his lifetime. The orchestral version as well as a piano arrangement of the accompaniment made by Josef Zubatý (B. 38) were published in 1879 by Simrock, whereas Bärenreiter Praha published Dvořák’s version with piano in 2015.

== Structure ==
The work is scored for two flutes, two oboes, two B♭ clarinets, two bassoons, two horns, strings, and solo violin; its duration is about 12 minutes.

The movement, in F minor, is marked Andante con moto. It is in sonata form: a graceful melody, from the String Quartet No. 5, leads to a theme in a contrasting key, of similar character, followed by a more restless theme and eventually to an episode of strident chords from the orchestra; the original calm mood prevails and the themes return; the work ends in F major.

== Discography ==
- Itzhak Perlman, Boston Symphony Orchestra, Seiji Ozawa, Sony CD (1994) and Kultur DVD (2007)
