= Alfred (Dvořák) =

Heroic opera by Antonín Dvořák

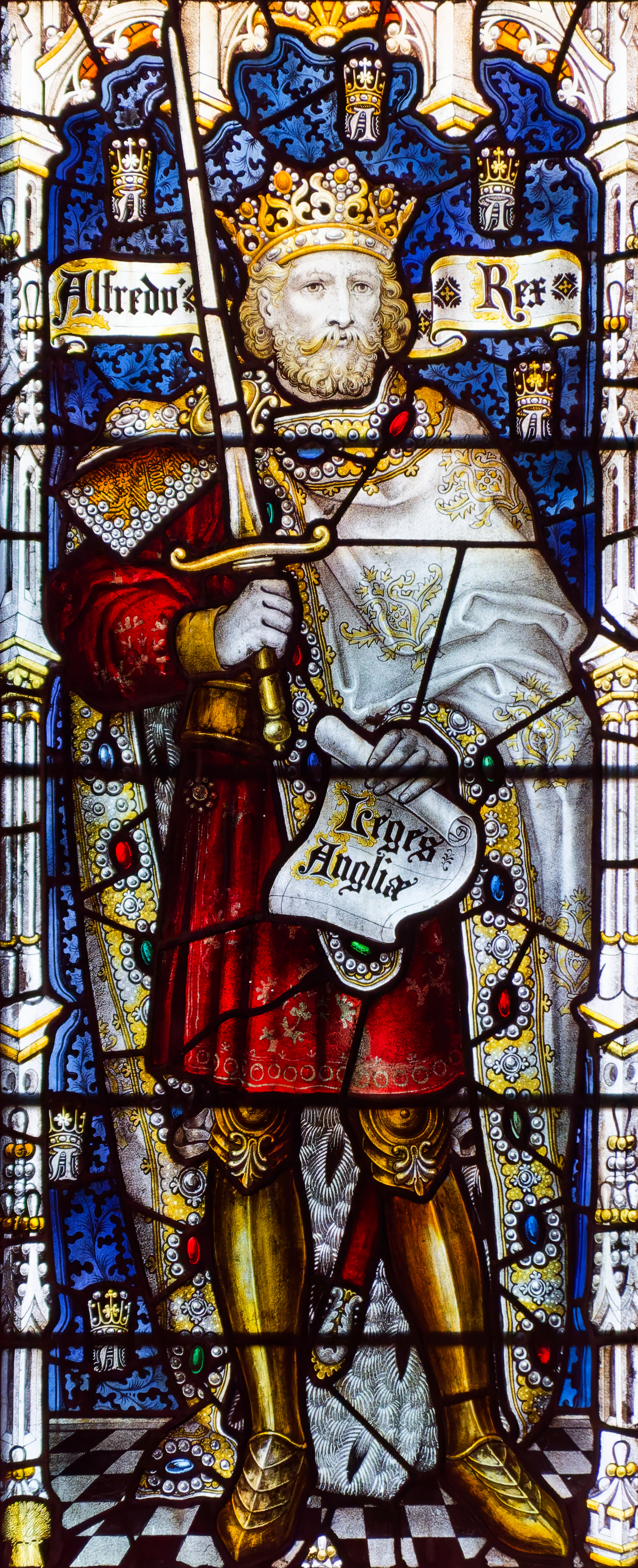
Stained glass of Alfred the Great, the subject of the opera

Alfred (B. 16) is a heroic opera in three acts by the Czech composer Antonín Dvořák. It was Dvořák's first opera and the only one he composed to a German text. The libretto, by Carl Theodor Körner, was set by Friedrich von Flotow (as Alfred der Große), based on the story of the English king Alfred the Great. Composed in 1870, Alfred was not performed during Dvořák's lifetime. The opera premiered (in Czech translation) at the City Theatre, Olomouc on 10 December 1938.

The opera was performed for the first time with the original German libretto on 17 September 2014, in Prague.

The overture (Tragic Overture) is well known and often performed separately.

== Roles ==
| Role | Voice type |
|---|---|
| King Alfred, King of the English | bass |
| Alvina, Alfred's fiancé, captive of Harald | soprano |
| Prince Harald, leader of the Danes | tenor |
| Prince Gothron, second leader of the Danes | bass/baritone |
| Sieward, Alfred's loyal servant | bass/baritone |
| Dorset, an English noble | tenor |
| Rovena, Alvina's friend | |

== Synopsis ==
The plot of Alfred takes place during a war between the English and Danes in the Middle Ages. The story follows the hero, Alfred, on his quest to rescue his love Alvina from the Danish leader Harald and lead the English to victory. The opera lasts about 140 minutes.

Act 1 – The Camp of the Danes: The opera opens in the Danish camp as they prepare to celebrate a victory over the English. Gothron sits apart from the crowd and is disturbed because the night before he dreamt that King Alfred wore a crown of victory. Harald arrives at camp, escorting British captives that include Alfred's fiancé Alvina. Harald attempts to woo Alvina, but she refuses his advances, preferring to be kept prisoner with the other captives.

Act 2 – A Wilderness in the Forest: King Alfred is present and learns from Sieward that his army was overtaken and Alvina captured by the Danes. Alfred plans to sneak into the Danish camp disguised as a harp player. Alfred hears Alvina singing from the tower where she is imprisoned and promises he will rescue her soon. Gothron's men surprise Alfred, and drag the supposed harpist into camp. Alvina escapes and arrives at the Danish camp as Alfred reveals his true identity. The two flee together as Gothron remembers his earlier dream.

Act 3 – A Rocky Glen in the Forest: Alvina comes across a group of British soldiers and informs them that Alfred is alive and well. She convinces them to join their king, but she is captured once more by Harald and his men. Harald again tries to convince Alvina to fall in love with him, but she refuses. Alfred charges into the camp with his army and the aid of the noble Dorset. Alfred's army is victorious, and Harald commits suicide instead of facing defeat. Alfred and Alvina are happily reunited, and the opera closes with the people rejoicing for their king and country.

== Background ==
Dvořák was working as a violist at the Prague Provisional Theatre when he began writing Alfred. He had yet to establish himself as an opera composer and had no access to a librettist. He used an existing 1811 libretto by the German poet Karl Theodor Koerner. How Dvořák came across the libretto is unclear. Josef Zubaty claims that Dvořák came across the text "in an old Almanach". Scholars such as Michael Beckerman theorize that the allure of a free and already notated libretto was attractive to Dvořák. Librettos written in Czech were few. Scholars note that with this first work, Dvořák was flexing the composing characteristics that would later define his work. He turned the original two act form into three acts. The opera is flavored by the influence of Wagner.

Dvořák did not promote Alfred possibly because of its German text at a time of intense nationalism by the Czech people. Dvořák did not feel confident in the score, as suggested by Clapham and Smaczny while others suggest the libretto was better suited for the German Singspiel. Dvořák did not include Alfred in his list of compositions, and except for possibly showing the opera to his friend and conductor Smetana, no one saw the score during Dvořák's lifetime. He allowed his second opera, King and Charcoal Burner, to pass as his first. However, the romantic scene between Vanda and Solvaj in his later opera Vanda is the same duet sung by Harald and Alvina at the end of Act 1 of Alfred, transposed to a different key.

== Musical influences ==
John Clapman states that as Alfred was Dvořák's first opera, the influence of several already well established composers is apparent throughout the score, especially Richard Wagner. Several critics, such as Jarmila Gabrijelova, pointed to Wagnerian concepts in several of Dvořák's early works; the orchestration of Alfred contains many leitmotifs, and frequent use of Wagnerian harmony and chromaticism. The influence of Czech folk songs is apparent in the ballet of the Danes as they celebrate their initial victory. The style of Italian opera composer Giuseppe Verdi is heard in full chorus scenes. One theme within the opera's overture references the works of composer Franz Liszt. One prelude in Act 2 uses Smetana's fondness of switching between the dominant seventh and the tonic. Alfred does leave room for improvement. Dvořák followed Körner's libretto closely, which resulted in several disjointed passages, a lack of action, and hit-or-miss characterizations.

== Performances ==
Dvořák planned for a performance of the overture from Alfred in May 1881 under the title Tragic Overture, but the piece was replaced by his third Slavonic Rhapsody.

A radio broadcast of excerpts from the opera aired in Prague on 6 February 1938 in the original German text.

The premiere stage performance of Alfred was at the Czech Theatre in Olomouc, with a Czech translation, on 10 December 1938, nearly thirty five years after Dvořák's death.

A performance of the full opera in the original German text was performed on 17 September 2014 during Dvořák's Prague festival.
