= String Quartet No. 12 (Dvořák) =

Antonín Dvořák's American String Quartet (Op. 96)

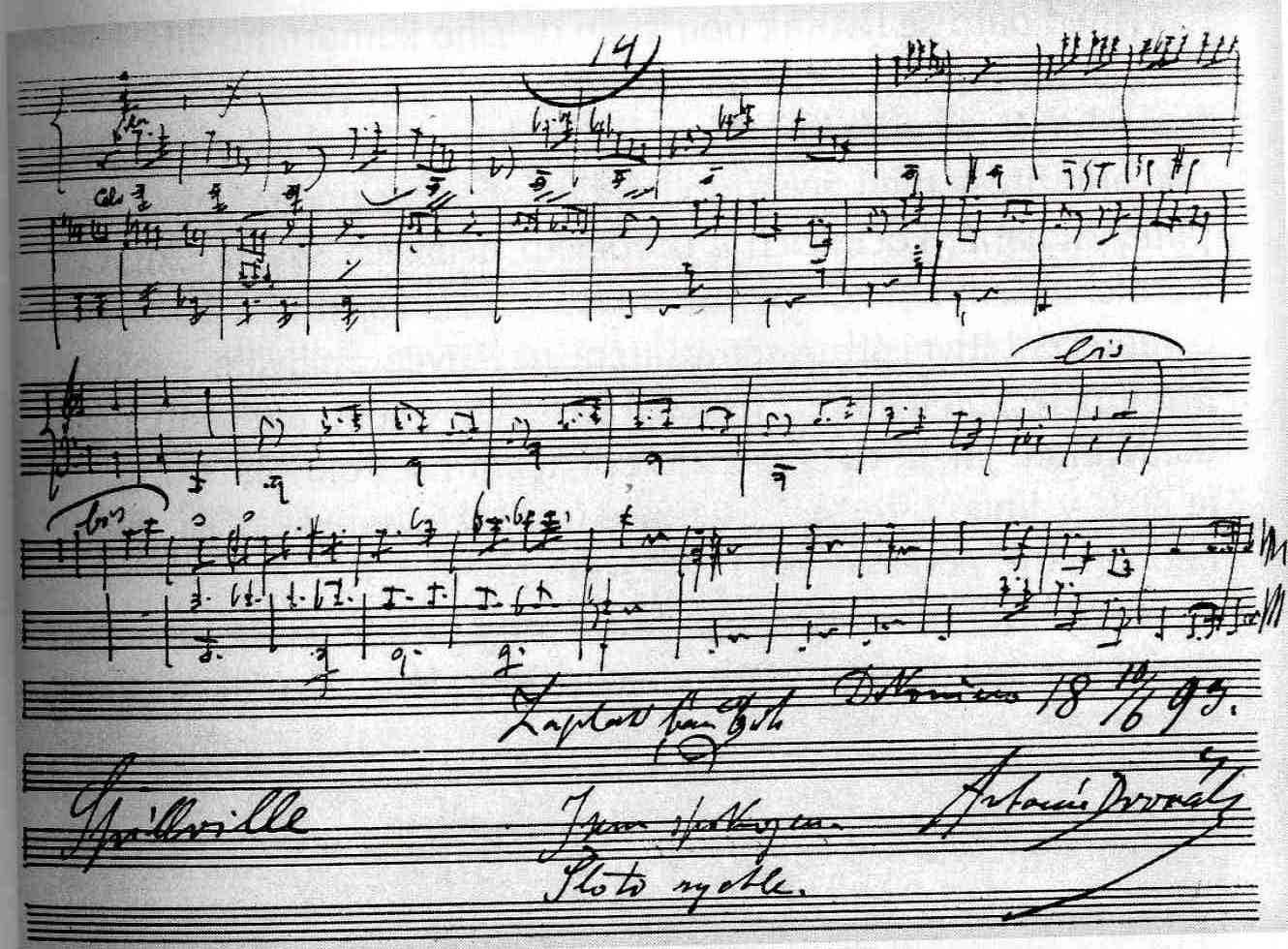
The last page of the autograph score of Dvořák's String_Quartet_No._12_with the composer's inscription: "Finished on 10 June 1893 in Spillville. Thanks God. I'm satisfied. It went quickly."

The String Quartet No. 12 in F major, Op. 96 (B. 179), nicknamed the American Quartet, is the twelfth string quartet composed by Antonín Dvořák. It was written in 1893, during Dvořák's time in the United States. The quartet is one of the most popular in the chamber music repertoire.

== Composition ==
I. Allegro ma non troppo

II. Lento

III. Molto vivace

IV. Finale: vivace ma non troppo
Performance by the Seraphina Quartet (Caeli Smith and Sabrina Tabby, violins; Madeline Smith, viola; Genevieve Tabby, cello)

Dvořák composed the quartet in 1893 during a summer vacation from his position as director (1892–1895) of the National Conservatory in New York City. He spent his vacation in the town of Spillville, Iowa, which was home to a Czech immigrant community. Dvořák went to Spillville through Josef Jan Kovařík. Kovařík had finished violin studies at the Prague Conservatory and was about to return to Spillville—his home in the United States—when Dvořák offered him a position as secretary. When Josef Jan accepted, he went to live with the Dvořák family in New York. He told Dvořák about Spillville, where his father Jan Josef was a schoolmaster, leading Dvořák to spend the summer of 1893 there.

Dvořák felt very much at ease in Spillville. Writing to a friend he described his state of mind, away from hectic New York: "I have been on vacation since 3 June here in the Czech village of Spillville and I won't be returning to New York until the latter half of September. The children arrived safely from Europe and we're all happy together. We like it very much here and, thank God, I am working hard and I'm healthy and in good spirits." He composed the quartet shortly after the New World Symphony, before that work had been performed.

Dvořák sketched the quartet in three days and completed it in thirteen more days, finishing the score with the comment "Thank God! I am content. It was fast." It was his second attempt to write a quartet in F major: his first effort, twelve years earlier, produced only one movement. The American Quartet proved a turning point in Dvořák's chamber music output: for decades he had toiled unsuccessfully to find a balance between his overflowing melodic invention and a clear structure. In the American Quartet it finally came together. Dvořák defended the apparent simplicity of the piece: "When I wrote this quartet in the Czech community of Spillville in 1893, I wanted to write something for once that was very melodious and straightforward, and dear Papa Haydn kept appearing before my eyes, and that is why it all turned out so simply. And it's good that it did."

Dvořák gave the subtitle for his symphony as, "From the New World". To the quartet he gave no subtitle, but there is the comment "The second composition written in America."

== Inspirations ==
For the London premiere of his New World symphony, Dvořák wrote: "As to my opinion I think that the influence of this country (it means the folk songs as are Negro, Indian, Irish, etc.) is to be seen, and that this and all other works (written in America) differ very much from my other works as well as in couleur as in character,..."

Dvořák's appreciation of African-American music is documented: Harry T. Burleigh, a baritone and later a composer, who knew Dvořák while a student at the National Conservatory, said, "I sang our Negro songs for him very often, and before he wrote his own themes, he filled himself with the spirit of the old Spirituals." Dvořák said: "In the Negro melodies of America I discover all that is needed for a great and noble school of music." For its presumed association with African-American music, the quartet was referred to with nicknames such as Negro and Nigger, before being called the American Quartet. The older nicknames, without negative connotations for the composition, were abandoned after the 1950s.

Dvořák wrote (in a letter he sent from America shortly after composing the quartet): "As for my new Symphony, the F major String Quartet and the Quintet (composed here in Spillville) – I should never have written these works 'just so' if I hadn't seen America." Listeners have tried to identify specific American motifs in the quartet. Some have claimed that the theme of the second movement is based on an African-American spiritual, or perhaps on a Kickapoo tune that Dvořák heard during his sojourn at Spillville.

Pentatonic scale

A characteristic, unifying element throughout the quartet is the use of the pentatonic scale. This scale gives the whole quartet its open, simple character, a character that is frequently identified with American folk music. However, the pentatonic scale is common in many traditional musics worldwide, and before coming to America Dvořák had composed pentatonic music, being familiar with such Slavonic folk music examples.

Specific American influences have been doubted: "In fact the only American thing about the work is that it was written there", writes Paul Griffiths. "The specific American qualities of the so-called "American" Quartet are not easily identifiable, writes Lucy Miller, "...Better to look upon the subtitle as simply one assigned because of its composition during Dvořák's American tour."

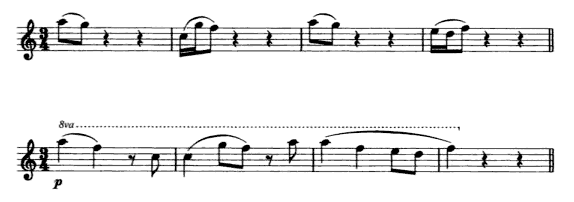
Dvořák's transcription of the song of a bird that he believed to be a scarlet tanager (top) and the appearance of the song in the third movement of the quartet. The identification of this bird as a scarlet tanager is questionable and it may have been a red-eyed vireo.

Some have heard suggestions of a locomotive in the last movement, recalling Dvořák's love of railroads.

Dvořák quoted in the third movement, measures 21–24, a bird that he heard in Iowa. The song appears as a high, interrupting strain in the first violin part. Dvořák was annoyed by this bird's insistent chattering, and transcribed its song in his notebook. In the 1950s, an English musicologist identified the bird as a scarlet tanager - a claim that has been repeated in books ever since. However, American ornithologist Ted Floyd showed in 2016 that the bird quoted by Dvořák likely was not a scarlet tanager; instead, the bird was probably a red-eyed vireo, another American songbird.

== Structure ==
The quartet is scored for the usual complement of two violins, viola, and cello, and comprises four movements: A typical performance of the work lasts 26 to 30 minutes.

=== I. Allegro ma non troppo ===
First theme of the first movement, played by the Seraphina Quartet

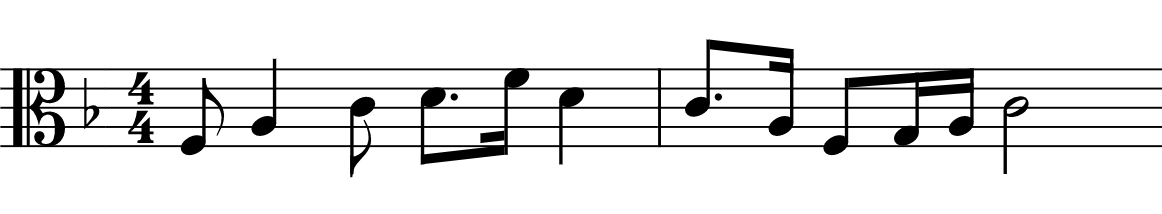
First movement, first theme

The opening theme of the quartet is purely pentatonic, played by the viola, with a rippling F major chord in the accompanying instruments. This same F major chord continues without harmonic change throughout the first twelve measures of the piece. The movement then goes into a bridge, developing harmonically, but still with the open, triadic sense of openness and simplicity.

Second theme of the first movement

The second theme, in A major, is also primarily pentatonic, but ornamented with melismatic elements reminiscent of Romani or Czech music. The movement moves to a development section that is much denser harmonically and much more dramatic in tempo and color.

Fugato at end of development

The development ends with a fugato section that leads into the recapitulation.

Cello bridge in recapitulation

After the first theme is restated in the recapitulation, there is a cello solo that bridges to the second theme.

=== II. Lento ===
Theme of the second movement

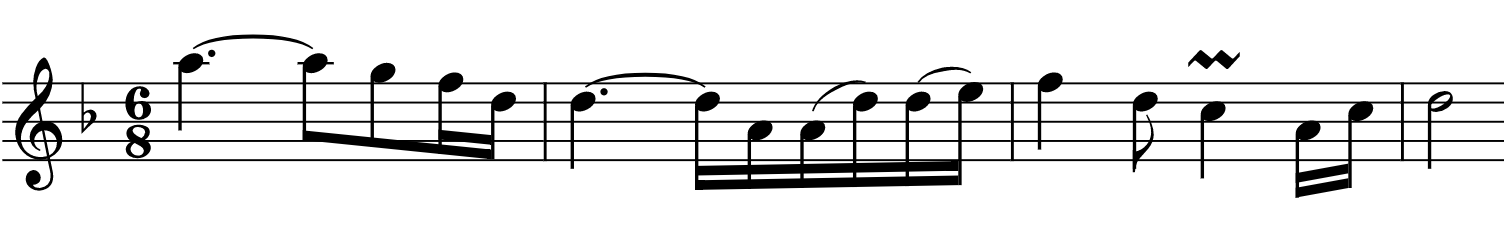
Second movement, theme

The theme of the second movement is the one that interpreters have most tried to associate with a Negro spiritual or with an American Indian tune. The simple melody, with the pulsing accompaniment in second violin and viola, does indeed recall spirituals or Indian ritual music. It is written using the same pentatonic scale as the first movement, but in the minor (D minor) rather than the major. The theme is introduced in the first violin, and repeated in the cello. Dvořák develops this thematic material in an extended middle section, then repeats the theme in the cello with an even thinner accompaniment that is alternately bowed and pizzicato.

=== III. Molto vivace ===
First section of the Scherzo movement - listen for the song of a forest songbird high in the first violin. Dvořák believed the bird to be a scarlet tanager, but it seems more likely that it was a red-eyed vireo.

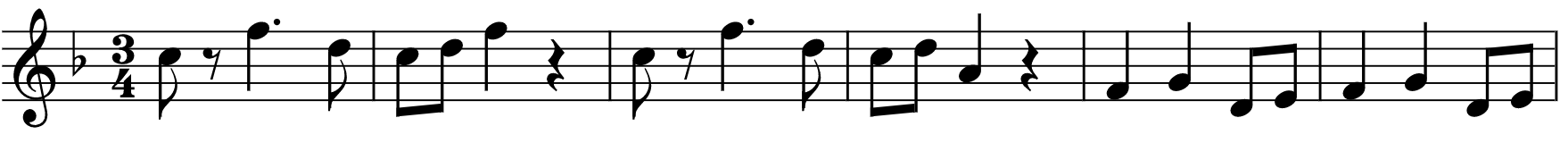
Third movement, main theme

The third movement is a variant of the traditional scherzo. It has the form A–B–A–B–A: the A section is a sprightly, somewhat quirky tune, full of off-beats and cross-rhythms. High in the first violin there appears the song of a bird the composer believed to be a scarlet tanager; however, the song was likely not that of the tanager.

Second section of the scherzo

The B section is a variation of the main scherzo theme, played in minor, at half tempo, and more lyrical. In its first appearance it is a legato line, while in the second appearance the lyrical theme is played in triplets, giving it a more pulsing character.

=== IV. Finale: vivace ma non troppo ===
Main theme of the last movement

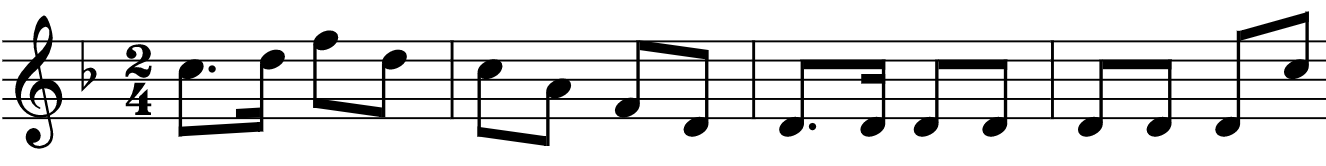
Fourth movement, main theme

The final movement is in a traditional rondo form, A–B–A–C–A–B–A. Again, the main melody is pentatonic. The movement's rhythm was inspired by Dvořák's experience riding on trains and hearing them chugging on tracks while traveling across America, as seen in the "chugging" of the second violin and viola throughout the piece.

"B" section of the rondo

The B section is more lyrical, but continues in the spirit of the first theme.

"C" section of the rondo

The C section is a chorale theme.

== Performance and influence ==
In a first private performance of the quartet, in Spillville, June 1893, Dvořák played first violin, Jan Josef Kovařík second violin, daughter Cecilie Kovaříková viola, and son Josef Jan Kovařík the cello.

The first two public performances of the quartet were by the Kneisel Quartet, in Boston on January 1, 1894, and then in New York City on January 13. An unnamed reviewer wrote the next day that to be sure, "there is none of the soaring or the yearning of the mighty Beethoven", but that there is "the spirit of eternal sunshine" that is "the soul of Mozart's music". Burghauser mentions press notices in both cities, the first in the New York Herald, December 18, 1893.

While the influence of American folk song is not explicit in the quartet, the impact of Dvořák's quartet on later American compositions is clear. Following Dvořák, a number of American composers turned their hands to the string quartet genre, including John Knowles Paine, Horatio Parker, George Whitefield Chadwick, and Arthur Foote. "The extensive use of folk-songs in 20th century American music and the 'wide-open-spaces' atmosphere of 'Western' film scores may have at least some of their origins" in Dvořák's new American style, writes Butterworth.

The piece is also used in the score for the Greta Gerwig film Little Women, for a pivotal scene in which Laurie and Jo dance for the first time.

== Notes ==
=== Sources ===
- Butterworth, Neil (1980). Dvořák: His Life and Times. Midas Books. ISBN 0-85936-142-X.
- Clapham, John (1979). Dvořák. New York: W. W. Norton. ISBN 0-393-01204-2.
- Miller, Lucy (2006). Adams to Zemlinsky. Concert Artists Guild. ISBN 1-892862-09-3.
- Griffiths, Paul (1983). The String Quartet, A History. Thames & Hudson. ISBN 0-500-27383-9.
- Hughes, Gervase (1967). Dvořák: His Life & Music. New York: Dodd, Mead.
- Šourek, Otakar [in Czech] (n.d.). The Chamber Music of Antonín Dvořák. Translated by Roberta Finlayson Samsour. Czechoslovakia: Artia.
