= Ballade (Dvořák) =

Composition by Antonín Dvořák

Ballade in D minor
- by Antonín Dvořák
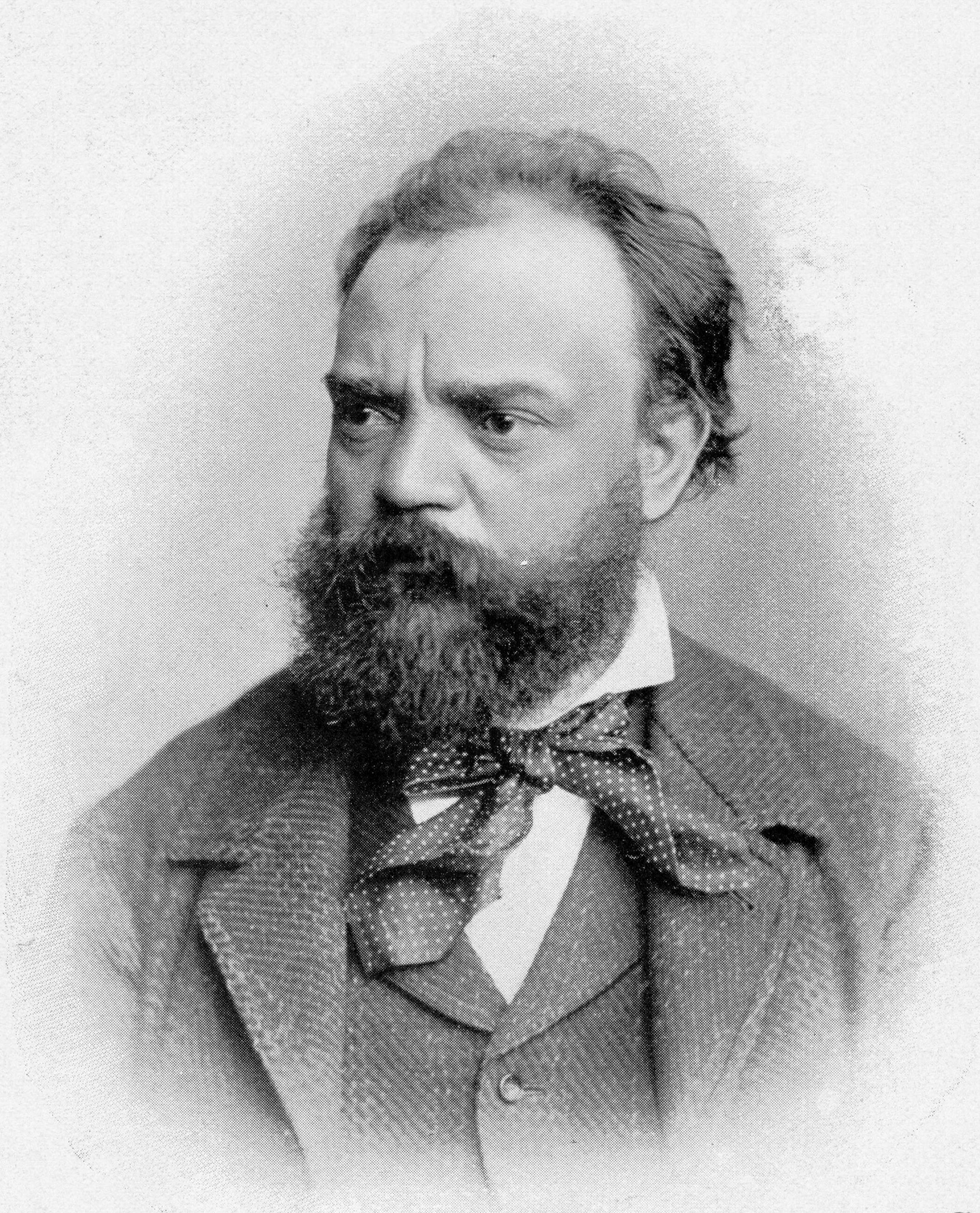
- Dvořák in 1882
- Key: D minor
- Catalogue: B. 139
- Opus: 15
- Composed: 1884
- Duration: 6 minutes
- Scoring: violin; piano

The Ballade in D minor, Op. 15 (B. 139), is a ballade for violin and piano, composed by Antonín Dvořák in 1884. As with the third piano trio, the Scherzo capriccioso, the Hussite Overture, and the seventh symphony, composed in the same period, the work is written in a more dramatic, dark and aggressive style that supersedes the carefree folk style of Dvořák's "Slavonic period".

The Ballade is one of three short pieces that Dvořák provided to John W. Coates, publisher of the journal Magazine of Music.

A typical performance lasts 6 minutes.
