= Tragic Overture (Dvořák) =

The Tragic Overture, B. 16a (also called the Dramatic Overture; Czech: Tragická ouvertura or Dramatická ouvertura) is an orchestral composition written in 1870 by the Czech composer Antonín Dvořák. It is Dvořák's overture to his first opera Alfred.

It was first performed on 4 January 1905, almost one year after Dvořák's death.
