= Symphony No. 7 (Dvořák) =

1885 symphony by Antonín Dvořák

- by Antonín Dvořák
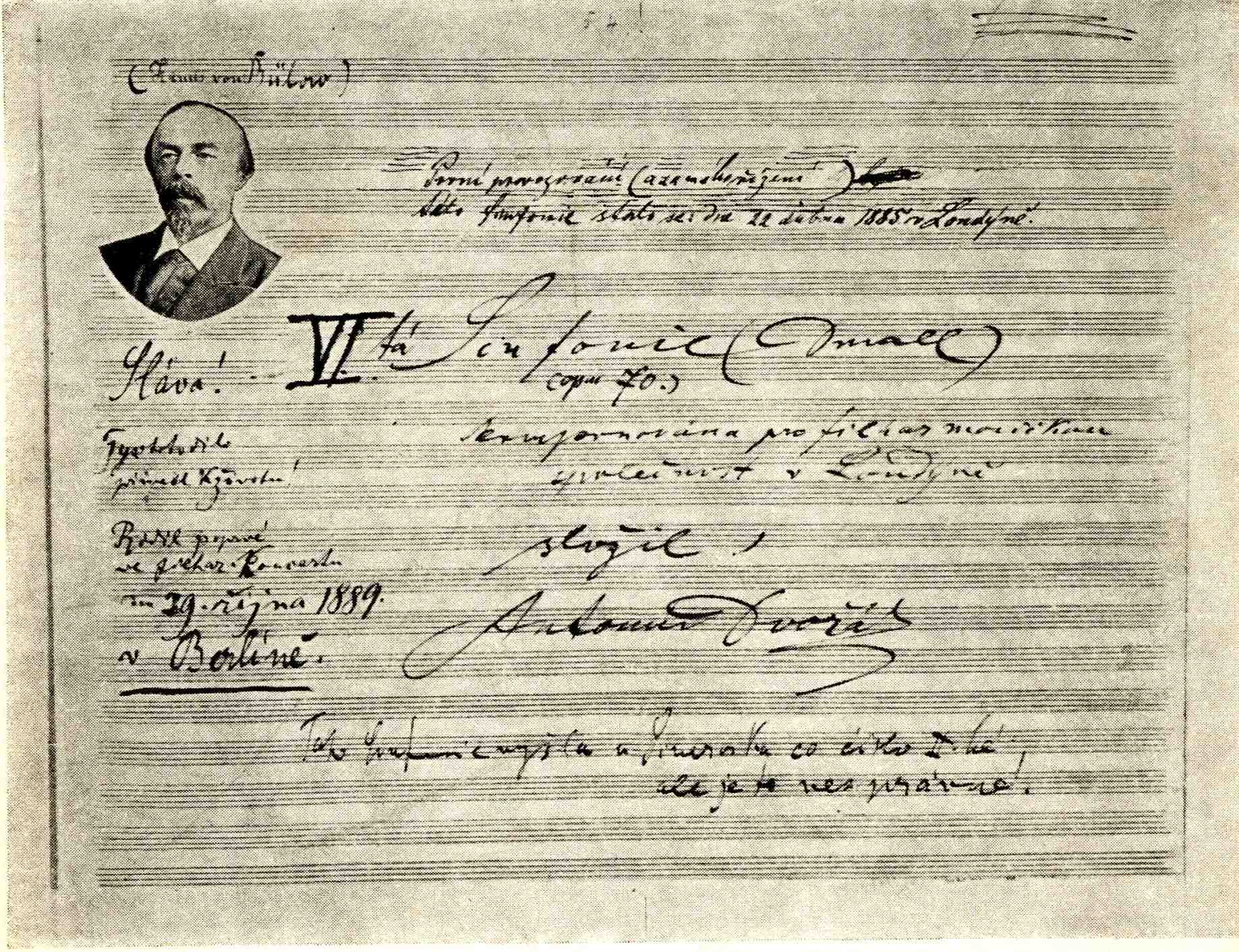
- Title page of the score, with a portrait of Hans von Bülow Dvořák thought his Symphony No. 1 was lost, so the manuscript is marked "VI" for "Sixth."
- Key: D minor
- Catalogue: B. 141
- Opus: 70
- Composed: 1885
- Dedication: Royal Philharmonic Society
- Duration: c. 40 minutes
- Movements: 4
- Scoring: Orchestra

Premiere
- Date: 22 April 1885
- Location: St James's Hall, London
- Conductor: Antonín Dvořák

Antonín Dvořák's Symphony No. 7 in D minor, Op. 70, B. 141, was completed on 17 March 1885 and first performed on 22 April 1885 at St James's Hall in London. It was originally published as Symphony No. 2. It is highly regarded by critics and musicologists; Donald Tovey stated that "along with the four Brahms symphonies and Schubert's Ninth, it is among the greatest and purest examples in this art-form since Beethoven".

== Structure ==
External audio
- Performed by the Berlin Philharmonic under Rafael Kubelík
- I. Allegro maestoso
- II. Poco adagio
- III. Scherzo (Vivace)
- IV. Finale (Allegro)

1. Allegro maestoso in D minor, 314 measures
2. Poco adagio in F major, 110 measures
3. Scherzo: Vivace — Poco meno mosso in D minor with Trio in G major, 255 measures
4. Finale: Allegro in D minor, ending on a Picardy third in D major, 434 measures

The work, approximately 40 minutes in length, is scored for an orchestra of two flutes (2nd doubling piccolo in the 3rd movement), two oboes, two clarinets (in A and B♭), two bassoons, four horns (in D and F), two trumpets (in C, D, B♭, and F), three trombones, timpani and strings.

As with other works of this period, including the Scherzo capriccioso, the third piano trio, the Hussite Overture, and the Ballade in D minor, the symphony is written in a more dramatic, dark and aggressive style that supersedes the carefree folk style of Dvořák's "Slavonic period".

A common reorchestration for the finale involves doubling the final violin/woodwind line with French horns, usually the principal.

== History ==
Dvořák's work on the symphony began on 13 December 1884. Dvořák had heard and admired Johannes Brahms' new Symphony No. 3, and this prompted him to think of writing of a new symphony himself. By chance, in that same year the Royal Philharmonic Society invited him to write a new symphony and elected him as an honorary member. A month later, after his daily walk to Prague railway station, he said "the first subject of my new symphony flashed in to my mind on the arrival of the festive train bringing our countrymen from Pest". The Czechs were in fact coming to the National Theatre in Prague, where there was to be a musical evening to support the political struggles of the Czech nation. He resolved that his new symphony would reflect this struggle. In doing so the symphony would also reveal something of his personal struggle in reconciling his simple and peaceful countryman's feelings with his intense patriotism and his wish to see the Czech nation flourish.

He completed a sketch of the first movement in five days, and he wrote to one of his friends: "I am now busy with this symphony for London, and wherever I go I can think of nothing else. God grant that this Czech music will move the world!!"

He finished his sketch of the slow movement ten days later. He added a footnote "From the sad years". This refers to the recent death of his mother, and probably also to the previous death of his eldest child, and these events were in his mind especially in this movement. However, there is also a broader horizon—he wrote to a friend "What is in my mind is Love, God, and my Fatherland." The movement starts with intense calm and peace, but also includes turmoil and unsettled weather. He told his publisher that "there is not one superfluous note". The critics Donald Tovey and Robert Layton both suggested that the second movement, like the furiant of Symphony No. 6, showed the influence of Czech sources, although Leon Botstein suggested that the relationship "seems overpowered by the formal mastery of Dvořák's development of the ideas."

In the next month or so Dvořák completed the sketches of the third and fourth movements. He later said that the 4th movement includes a suggestion of the capacity of the Czech people to display stubborn resistance to political oppressors. In 1885 it received its brilliantly successful first performance at St James's Hall in London, with Dvořák himself conducting.

Despite the success of the symphony, the publication of the work was a nightmare. Dvořák's contracted German publisher, Fritz Simrock, seemed to go out of his way to make difficulties and to irritate him. First, he said he could not consider publishing it until a piano duet arrangement was available. Simrock then flatly refused to print his Czech name, Antonín, on the cover—the publisher insisted that it be Anton, and that the title page be in German only. Finally, he was told that the dedication to the Royal Philharmonic Society would have to be omitted. During all of these prolonged arguments, Dvořák asked Simrock for an advance: "I have a lot of expense with my garden, and my potato crop isn't very good". Eventually, Simrock offered only 3,000 marks for the symphony, which was a low value for such a major work. Dvořák replied that other publishers would readily pay twice as much. After further argument, Simrock grudgingly paid the 6,000 marks.

== Evaluation ==
The Dvořák specialist John Clapham writes that "without doubt" the No. 7 "must surely be Dvořák's greatest symphony," although elsewhere he writes that the No. 9 is the most popular worldwide. As Symphony No. 9 is so often played, Clapham in effect recommends that conductors perform, and listeners hear, No. 7 as well. Bernard Shore stated "There is no doubt that the seventh in D minor is the finest of the series [of Dvořák symphonies]" and Tovey implicitly agrees.

== Performance history ==
Performances during Dvořák's life, excluding the London premiere.

- Prague, Austria-Hungary: 29 November 1885, conducted by Dvořák himself at Rudolfinum
- Vienna, Austria-Hungary: 16 January 1887, conducted by Hans Richter
- Berlin, German Empire: 27 October 1889, conducted by Hans von Bülow
- Berlin, German Empire: 28 October 1889, conducted by Hans von Bülow
