= La lugubre gondola =

Piano composition by Franz Liszt

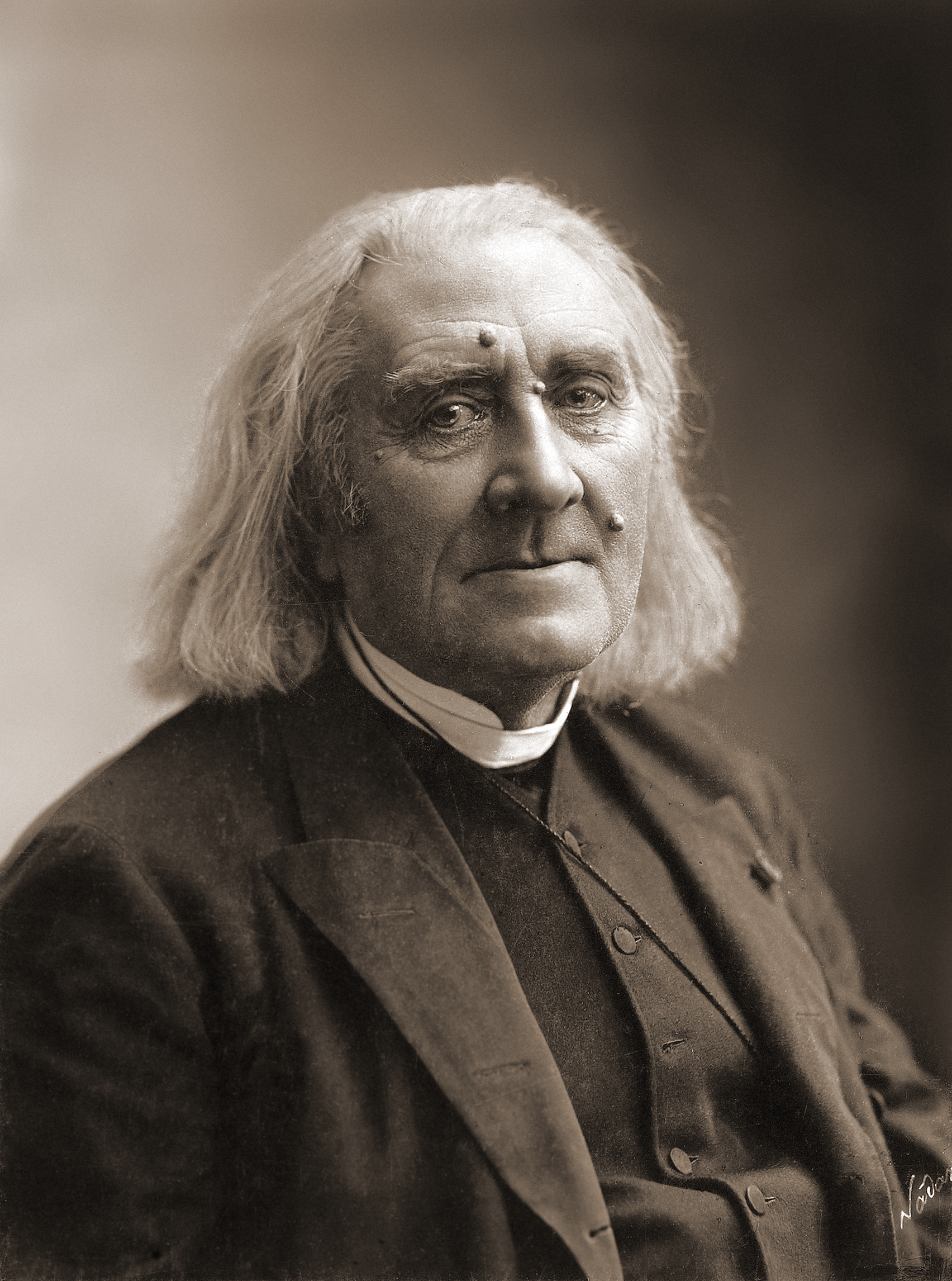
Franz Liszt in March 1886, photographed by Nadar

La lugubre gondola, a piano piece, is one of Franz Liszt's most important late works, written in 1882.

== History ==
Its genesis is well documented in letters from which we know that Liszt was Richard Wagner's guest in the Palazzo Vendramin on the Grand Canal in Venice in late 1882. Liszt may have had a premonition there of Wagner's death which inspired the first version of the work: a piano piece in 4/4, written in December 1882 (which remained unpublished until the Rugginenti edition of 2002). This piece was recomposed the next month, in January 1883, and very shortly thereafter arranged for violin or cello and piano. The piano version was published in 1885, with minor changes (this version is today usually called La lugubre gondola II). This was the only version of this piece published in Liszt's lifetime.

Wagner died in Venice on February 13, 1883, and the long funeral procession to Bayreuth began with the funeral gondola to Venice's Santa Lucia railway station. Liszt was by now almost certainly considering the piece to be a Wagner memorial, and in 1885 he returned to the string version and replaced the last three bars with a twenty-bar coda. This was probably done before the publication of the solo version, because the new extended string version does not contain the minor alterations in the published solo version.

According to Liszt's correspondence with Lina Ramann, La Lugubre Gondola was originally to have been entitled Troisième élégie and was to have been dedicated to her.

There is an undated manuscript, clearly from the end of Liszt's life, of a starker version of the piece in 6/8 for piano solo - virtually a new composition. It remained unpublished until 1927, when it was published alongside the other version of the piece, but with the same title. So since 1927, the 4/4 piece has been known as La lugubre gondola II, and the hitherto unpublished 6/8 piece is usually called La lugubre gondola I.

The opening single melodic line of La Lugubre Gondola No. 2 can be seen to be inspired by Wagner’s unending melodies, and the unresolved diminished sevenths and unfinished phrases are reminiscent of the Prelude to Wagner's Tristan und Isolde. Liszt then develops this into a more lyrical, romantic line.

== Editions ==
- Venice manuscripts (written 1882 and 1883) published by Rugginenti [Milan] in 2002.
- Cello version and violin version (written 1883) published by Hardie Press [Edinburgh].
- 1885 4/4 piano version [La lugubre gondola II] and 1880s 6/8 piano version [La lugubre gondola I] published by Editio Musica Budapest.
