= Fritz Krauss (tenor) =

German opera singer (1883–1976)

Fritz Krauss (June 16, 1883, Lehenhammer, near Amberg-Sulzbach – Feb 28, 1976, Überlingen) was a German operatic tenor. He made his debut in Bremen in 1911. He was a resident principal tenor at the Cologne Opera from 1915 until 1921 when he left to take the same position at the Bavarian State Opera (BSO). He remained at BSO until his retirement in 1943. There he portrayed Asmus in the world premiere of Hans Pfitzner's Das Herz in 1931. He also made guest appearances at the Royal Opera House in London and the Vienna State Opera. He excelled in the operas of Wolfgang Amadeus Mozart, portraying Ferrando in Così fan tutte, Don Ottavio in Don Giovanni, Belmonte in Die Entführung aus dem Serail, and Tamino in The Magic Flute. Other roles in repertoire included Florestan in Fidelio, Radames in Aida, and the title roles in Lohengrin, Tannhäuser, and The Tales of Hoffmann among others.
