= Nocturne in B major (Dvořák) =

1883 composition by Antonín Dvorák

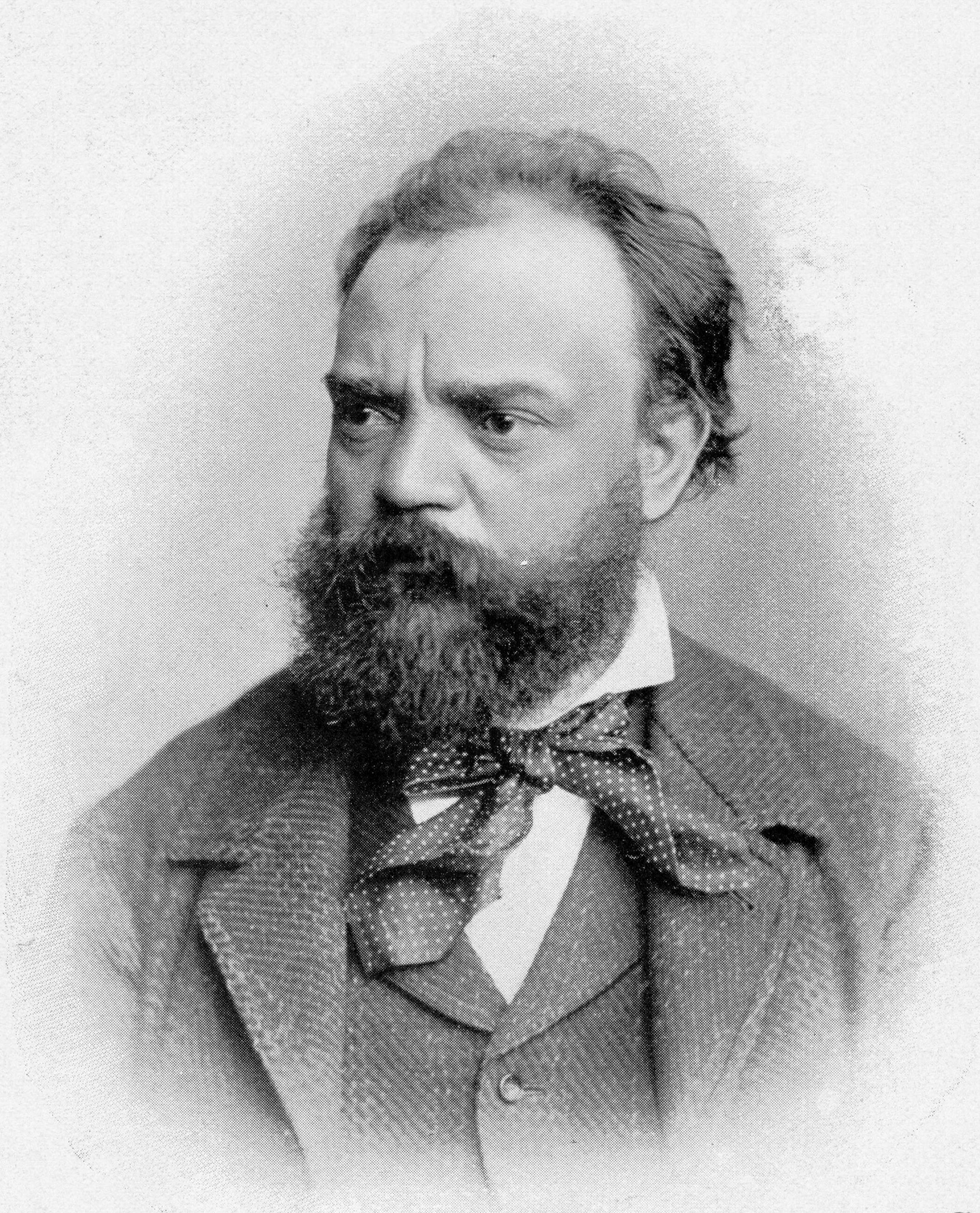
Antonín Dvořák in 1882

The Nocturne in B major, Op. 40 (B. 47), is a single-movement composition for string orchestra by Antonín Dvořák, published in 1883.

== History ==
The work originated as the slow movement, Andante religioso, of Dvořák's early string quartet, No. 4 in E minor, of 1870, which was unpublished in his lifetime. The movement was adapted and included in his String Quintet No. 2 in G, of 1875: it was one of two slow movements, and he later withdrew this movement from the quintet.

He developed it into this nocturne; the work was published in 1883 by Simrock. It was premiered under the composer's baton at Crystal Palace in London, on 22 March 1885. As well as the version for string orchestra (B. 47), he made versions for violin and piano (B. 48a) and piano four hands (B. 48b).

== Structure ==
The work is in the key of B major, and its duration is about 9 minutes. There is a calm atmosphere throughout. After a simple introduction in octaves, there is a long section, featuring a winding melody over a pedal note of F♯ which gives a sense of anticipation; eventually this gives way to a more animated section. Finally there is a return, without the sense of anticipation, to the original texture.

== Recordings ==
The work has been a popular one to record and perform, with recordings extant from the early 1940s. There are several recordings of the original string quintet version as well as the standard orchestral one. Some prominent recordings are:

Year	Conductor	Orchestra	Label
1941	Anthony Bernard	London Chamber Orchestra	HMV
1941	Leslie Heward	Hallé Orchestra	Columbia
1941	Adolf Busch	Busch Chamber Players	Columbia
1948	Karel Boleslav Jirák	Czech Radio Symphony Orchestra	Ultraphon
1956	Cedric Dumont	Boyd Neel Orchestra	Philips
1969	Václav Neumann	Czech Philharmonic	Supraphon
1979	Sir Neville Marriner	Academy of St. Martin in the Fields	EMI
1980	Antal Doráti	Detroit Symphony Orchestra	Decca
1981	Gerard Schwarz	Los Angeles Chamber Orchestra	Delos
1984	Vernon Handley	London Philharmonic Orchestra	Chandos
1989	André Previn	Los Angeles Philharmonic Orchestra	Telarc
1990	Raymond Leppard	Indianapolis Symphony Orchestra	Koss
1990		Orpheus Chamber Orchestra	Deutsche Grammophon
1993	Václav Neumann	Prague Chamber Orchestra	Delos
1994	Jiří Bělohlávek	Czech Philharmonic	Supraphon
1994	Charles Mackerras	English Chamber Orchestra	EMI
1994		Coull Quartet	Hyperion
1995	Yuli Turovsky	I Musici de Montréal	Chandos
1998	Josef Suk	Suk Chamber Orchestra	SKO
1999	Iván Fischer	Budapest Festival Orchestra	Philips
2000		Vlach Quartet	Naxos
2001		L'Archibudelli	Sony
2004	Joseph Swensen	Scottish Chamber Orchestra	Linn
2010	Marin Alsop	Baltimore Symphony Orchestra	Naxos
2011		Berlin Philharmonic String Quintet	Pentatone
