= Silent Woods (Dvořák) =

Composition by Antonín Dvořák

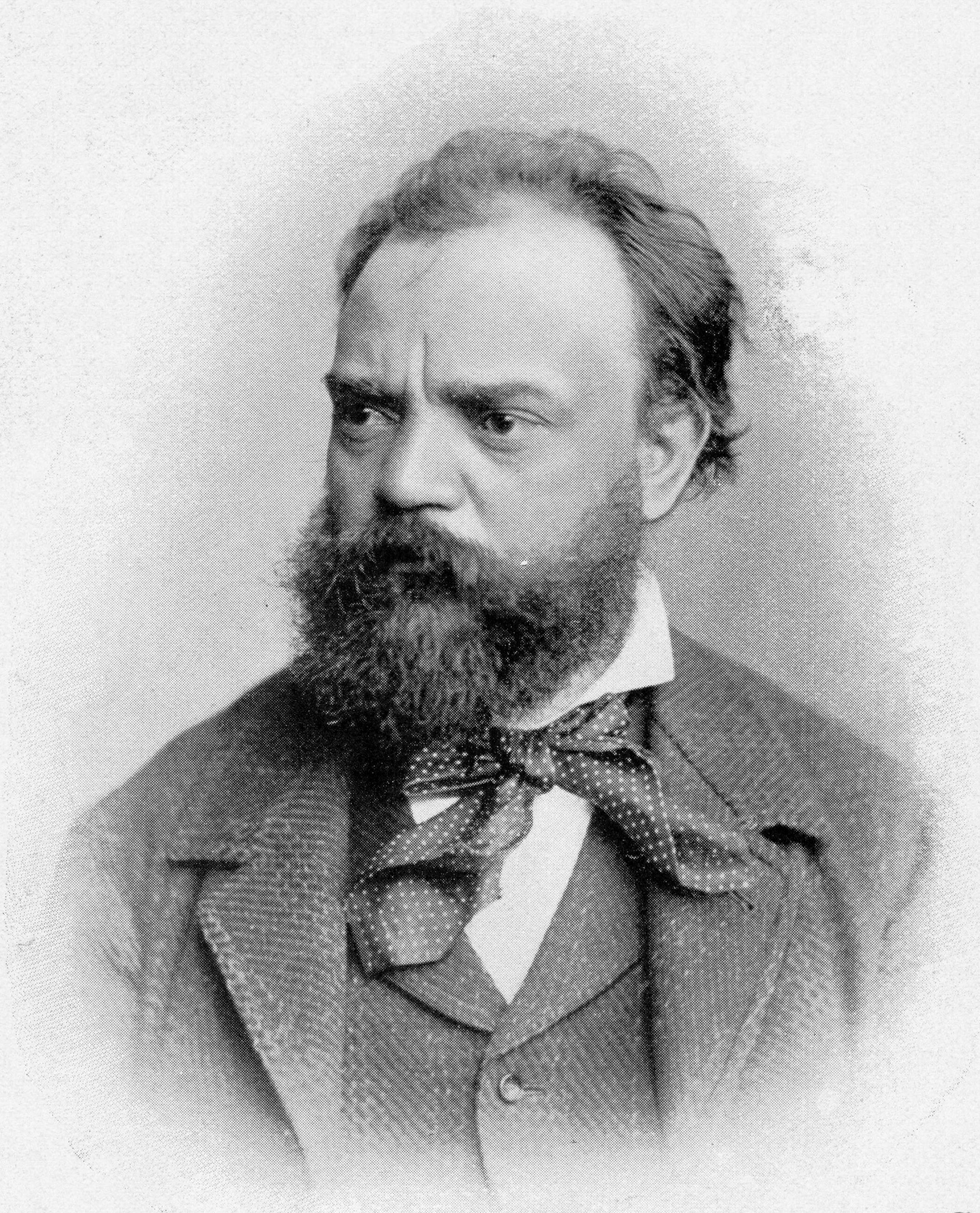
Antonín Dvořák in 1882

Silent Woods (Czech: Klid) is the translated title of the composition by Antonín Dvořák initially published under the German title Waldesruhe. It is the fifth part of the cycle for piano four-hands, Ze Šumavy (From the Bohemian Forest) Op. 68, B. 133, composed in 1883. The work is also transcribed by the composer for cello and piano (B. 173) and for cello and orchestra (B. 182).

The original piano cycle Op. 68 was composed in 1883 on demand of Fritz Simrock. As it was popular in the late nineteenth century to make arrangements of popular works for other instruments, on 28 December 1891 Dvořák made an arrangement for cello and piano of the fifth piece, for a farewell concert tour he gave with violinist Ferdinand Lachner and cellist Hanuš Wihan in the first months of 1892 before embarking for the New World. The arrangement became so popular that Dvořák made a new arrangement for cello and orchestra on 28 October 1893. The arrangements were first published in the fall of 1894 by Fritz Simrock, who changed the German title given by Dvořák – Die Ruhe (The Silence), a literal translation from the Czech Klid – to Waldesruhe (Silent Woods).

Like the other pieces in Op.68, Silent Woods is a lyrical character piece, bearing the tempo marking Lento e molto cantabile for the main, dreamy theme in D♭ major, which is reprised (Lento. Tempo I) after a light intermezzo (Un pochettino più mosso) in C♯ minor.

== Discography ==
- Jacqueline du Pré, Chicago Symphony Orchestra, Daniel Barenboim, EMI Records (1970)
- Yo-Yo Ma, Boston Symphony Orchestra, Seiji Ozawa, Sony CD (1994) and Kultur DVD (2007)
- Harriet Krijgh, Staatsphilharmonie Rheinland-Pfalz, Gustavo Gimeno, Capriccio (record label) (2015)
