= Hussite Overture =

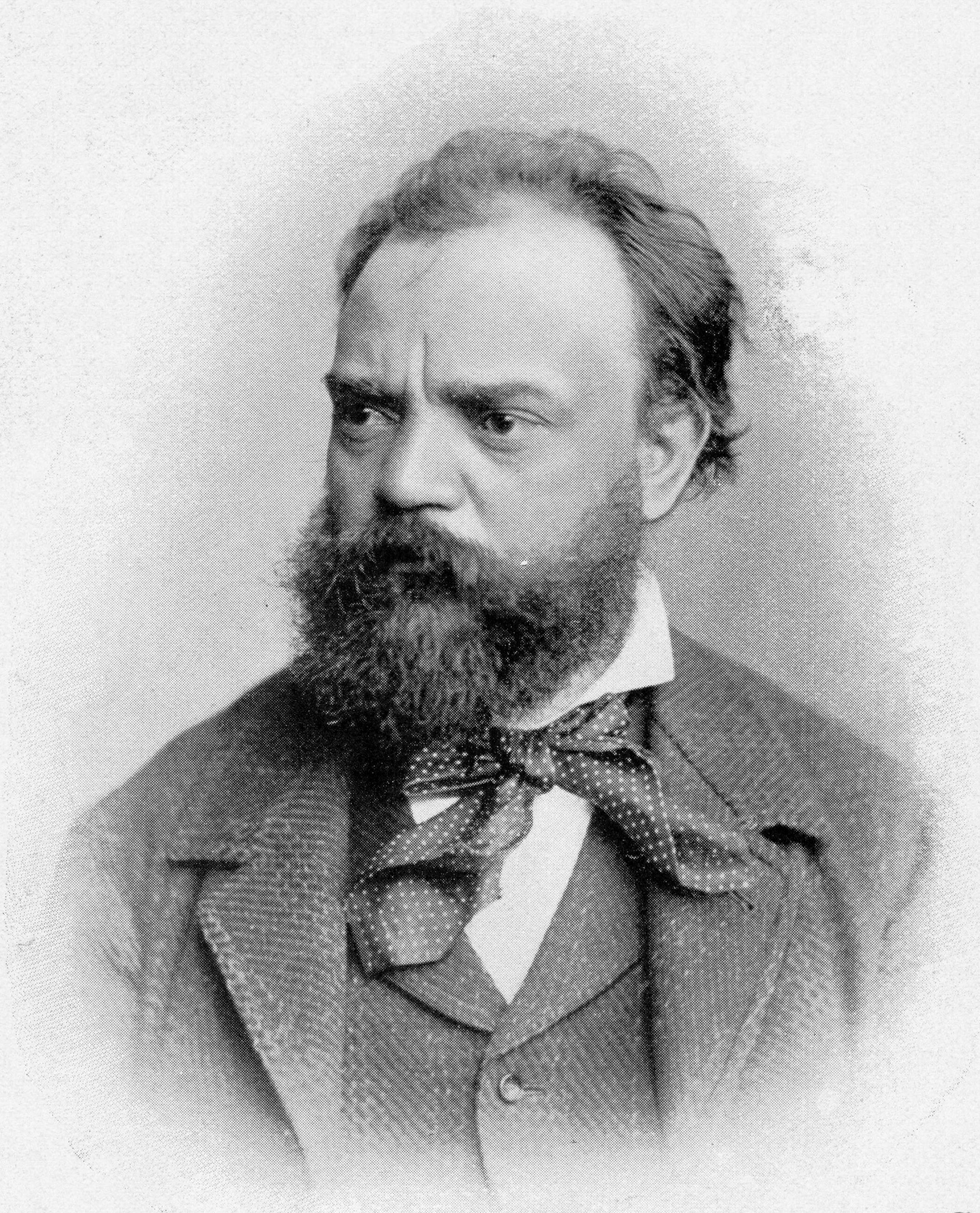
Antonín Dvořák in 1882

The Hussite Overture (Czech: Husitská, dramatická ouvertura), Op. 67, B. 132, was written by Antonín Dvořák in 1883 for the gala opening of the Prague National Theater. The composition was originally intended as a part of a dramatic trilogy on the Bohemian religious leader Jan Hus.

As with the third piano trio, the Scherzo capriccioso, the Ballade in D minor, and the seventh symphony, composed in the same period, the work is written in a more dramatic, dark and aggressive style that supersedes the carefree folk style of Dvořák's "Slavonic period".

The overture is scored for piccolo, 2 flutes, 2 oboes, cor anglais, 2 clarinets, 2 bassoons, 4 horns, 2 trumpets, 3 trombones, tuba, timpani, percussion (bass drum, cymbals, triangle), harp, and strings.

== Performance history ==
Early performances of Dvořák's Hussite Overture included:

- Prague, Austria-Hungary: 18 November 1883, conducted by Mořic Stanislav Anger
- Prague, Austria-Hungary: 19 November 1883, conducted by Mořic Stanislav Anger
- London, Great Britain: 20 March 1884, conducted by Dvořák himself
- Berlin, German Empire: 21 November 1884, conducted by Dvořák himself
- Prague, Austria-Hungary: 3 April 1887, conducted by Dvořák himself
- Frankfurt, German Empire: 7 November 1890, conducted by Dvořák himself
- Worcester, United States: 28 September 1893, conducted by Dvořák himself
