= Piano Trio No. 3 (Dvořák) =

Piano trio by Antonín Dvořák

Piano Trio
- No. 3
- by Antonín Dvořák
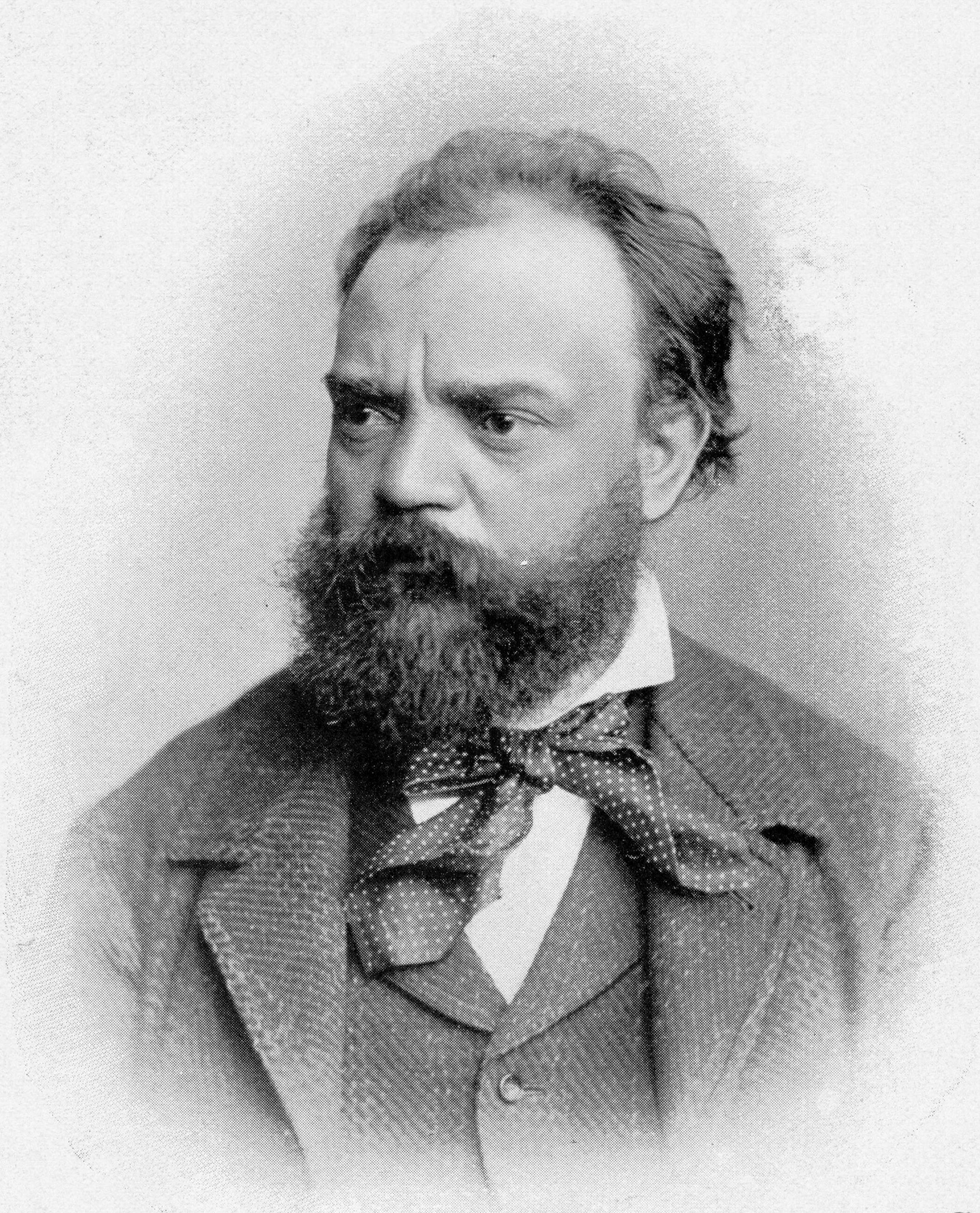
- Dvořák in 1882
- Key: F minor
- Catalogue: B. 130
- Opus: 65
- Composed: 1883
- Performed: 27 October 1883: Mladá Boleslav
- Published: 1883
- Publisher: Simrock
- Duration: c. 39 minutes
- Movements: 4

The Piano Trio No. 3 in F minor, Op. 65 (B. 130), is a piano trio by Antonín Dvořák. As with the Scherzo capriccioso, the Hussite Overture, the Ballade in D minor, and the Seventh Symphony, composed in the same period, the work is written in a more dramatic, dark and aggressive style that supersedes the carefree folk style of Dvořák's "Slavonic period".

== Structure ==
The composition consists of four movements in the classical tradition:

1. Allegro ma non troppo (F minor)
2. Allegretto grazioso – Meno mosso (C♯ minor)
3. Poco adagio (A♭ major)
4. Finale. Allegro con brio (F minor)

A typical performance takes approximately 39 minutes.

== History ==
Dvořák began writing out the piano trio in February 1883 and completed it on 31 March. The premiere was held on 27 October 1883 at a concert in Mladá Boleslav; Dvořák himself played the piano part, with Ferdinand Lachner playing violin and Alois Neruda 'cello. The piece was published shortly after by Simrock.

== Reception ==
Eduard Hanslick wrote in the Neue Freie Presse on 13 February 1884: "The most valuable gem brought to us amid the plethora of concerts in recent weeks is undeniably Dvorak’s new Piano Trio in F minor. It demonstrates that the composer finds himself at the pinnacle of his career."

== Discography ==
- Dvořák: Piano Trios, Op. 65 & 90 "Dumky", Max Brod Trio, AUD 703 1682-2 MDG - Musikproduktion Dabringhaus und Grimm (2011), www.mdg.de
- Dvořák: Piano Trios Nos. 3 & 4. Christian Tetzlaff (vn), Tanja Tetzlaff (vc), Lars Vogt (pf). Ondine (2018)
