= String Quartet No. 5 (Dvořák) =

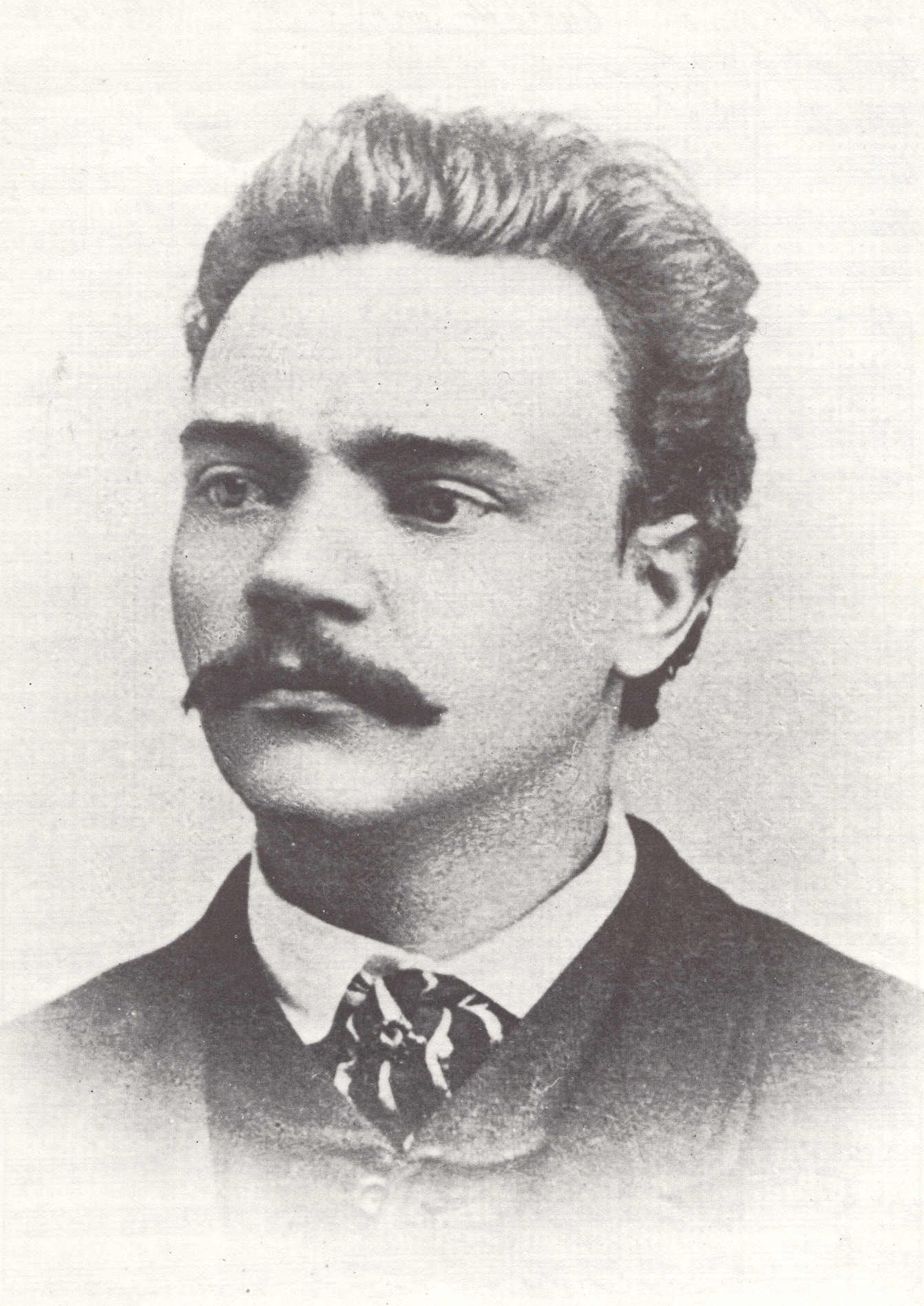
Antonín Dvořák in 1868

Antonín Dvořák wrote his String Quartet No. 5 in F minor, Op. 9 (B. 37), in September 1873, the composition was finished on 4 October 1873.

The Bennewitz Quartet incorporated the quartet to their concert cycle, however later refused to play it due to "lack of quartet style". Dvořák was very upset and tore out the title page of the score (probably with dedication to Bennewitz). The composition was in 1929 reconstructed by Günther Raphael. The work in that version was premiered by the Kramář Quartet (Jan Buchtele, Ferdinand Karhánek, J. Lupínek and Vaclav Kefurt) on 11 January 1930, at the Prague Corn Exchange.

== Structure ==
It is composed of four movements:

1. Moderato — Allegro con brio
2. Andante con moto quasi allegretto
3. Tempo di valse
4. Finale: Allegro molto

Its second movement later served as the basis for Dvořák's Romance in F minor for violin and orchestra, Op. 11.

== Selected recordings ==
- Antonín Dvořák: Chamber Works Vol. 4. CD Supraphon (11 1453-2 131). (Panocha Quartet)
