= Quartet Movement in F major, B.120 (Dvořák) =

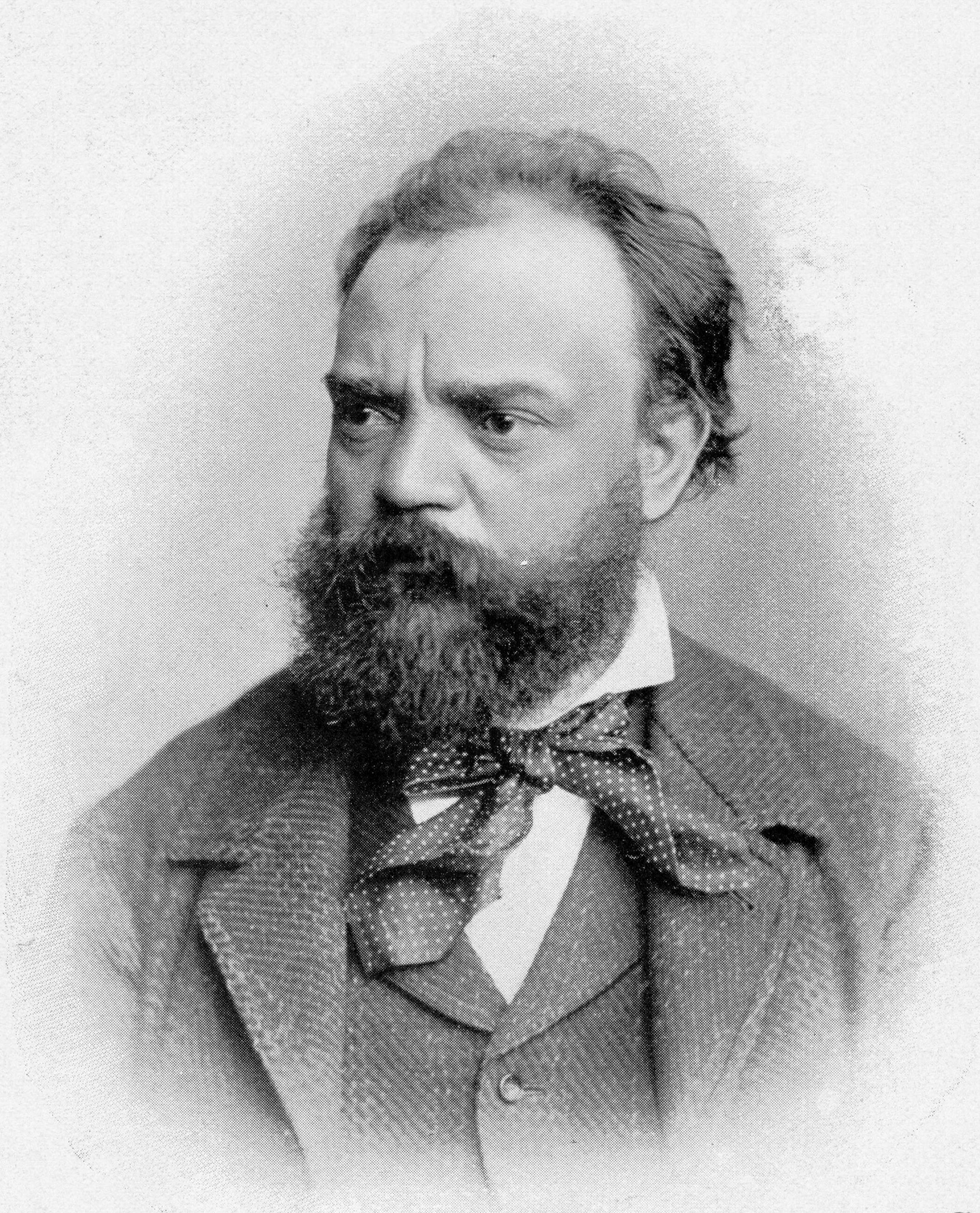
Antonín Dvořák in 1882

The Quartet Movement in F major, B. 120, is the first movement of a planned string quartet in F major by Antonín Dvořák composed in early October 1881 to fulfill a commission from the Hellmesberger Quartet and abandoned in favour of the String Quartet No. 11 in C major, Op. 61, B. 121.

== Background ==
In October 1881, Dvořák was working on his new opera Dimitrij, when it was announced in a Viennese newspaper that the Hellmesberger Quartet was going to premiere a new Dvořák string quartet on 15 December 1881.

Deciding to temporarily abandon work on the opera to concentrate on the quartet, Dvořák completed the first movement in three days before abandoning the quartet around 10 October 1881 and starting again, this time in the key of C major on 25 October 1881. It is unclear why this happened; Terry Barfoot speculates that Dvořák felt the completed movement lacked tension. Geijtenbeek claims that Dvořák believed at the time that it was impossible to write a quartet in F major (Dvořák was to later write his 12th String Quartet in the same key). Writing in The Cambridge Companion to the String Quartet Jan Smaczny states that the completed movement is inferior to the C major quartet Dvořák completed.

The Quartet Movement was premiered by the Ondřiček Quartet during a concert broadcast on Radio Prague in 1945. Šourek stated that the first publication of the movement was by Hudební Matice of Prague in 1949. Anderson in his liner notes to the Naxos recording states that the year of first publication was 1951.

== Structure ==
The composition consists of a single movement marked, "Allegro vivace" and lasts around 9 1/2 minutes in performance.
