= Scherzo capriccioso (Dvořák) =

Orchestral work by Antonín Dvořák

- by Antonín Dvořák
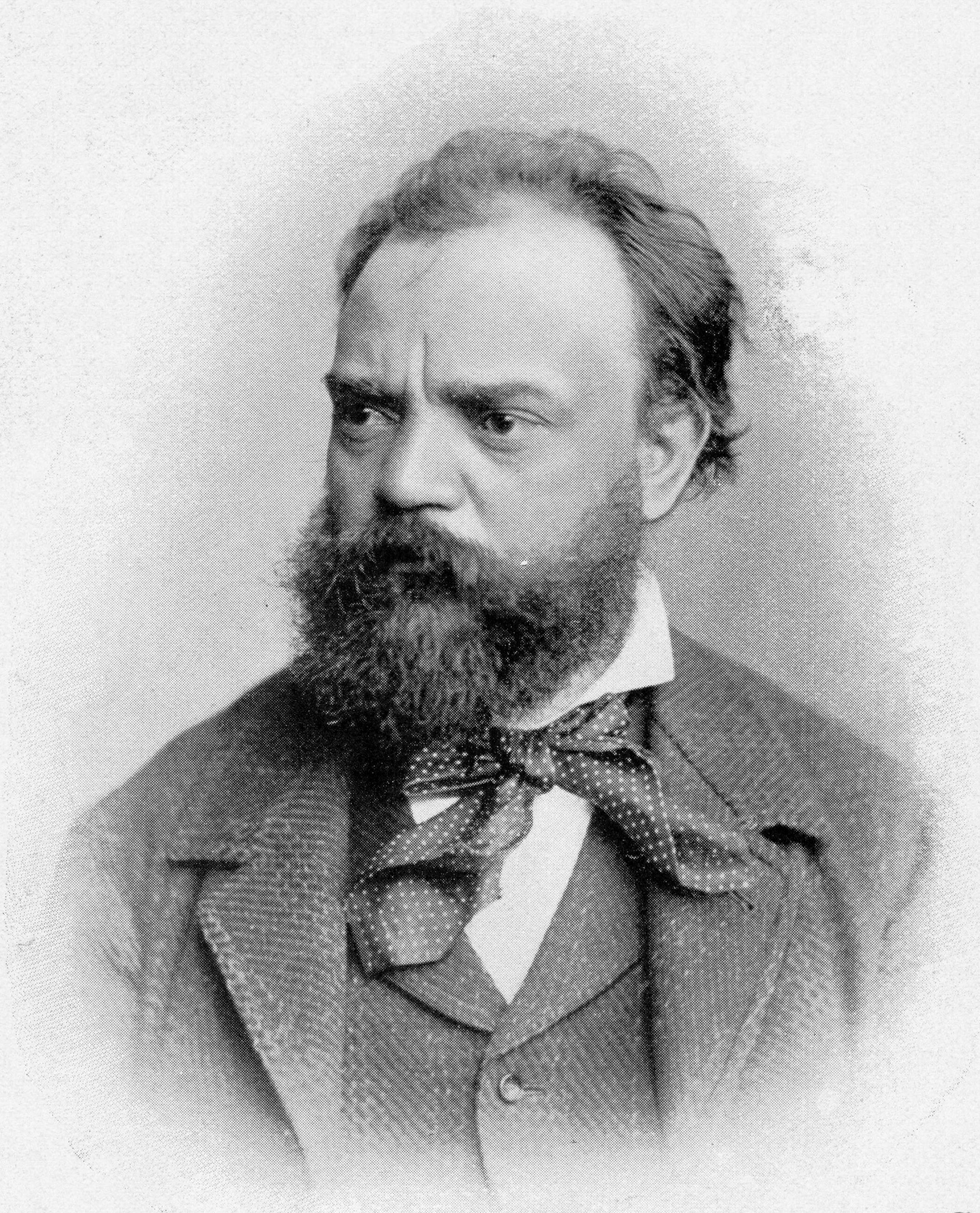
- Dvořák in 1882
- Key: D♭ major
- Catalogue: B. 131
- Opus: 66
- Composed: 1883
- Duration: approximately 14 minutes
- Scoring: Orchestra

Premiere
- Date: 1883
- Location: National Theatre, Prague
- Conductor: Adolf Čech

The Scherzo capriccioso in D♭ major, Op. 66 (B. 131), is an orchestral work by Antonín Dvořák. Composed in 1883, it was premiered the same year at the National Theatre under Adolf Čech. A typical performance takes approximately 14 minutes.

As with the third piano trio, the Hussite Overture, the Ballade in D minor, and the seventh symphony, composed in the same period, the work is written in a more dramatic, dark and aggressive style that supersedes the carefree folk style of Dvořák's "Slavonic period". It also bears other notable features, including development occurring in the exposition, counterpoint creating dense structure, and the sound of the orchestra often being punctuated by the distinctive use of the cor anglais and bass clarinet.
