= Simrock =

Simrock may refer to the German sheet music publisher N. Simrock, or one of the following members of the Simrock family engaged in that business:

- Nikolaus Simrock (1751–1832), founder of N. Simrock
- Karl Joseph Simrock (1802–1876), son of Nikolaus
- Fritz Simrock (1837–1901), grandson of Nikolaus
