= Piano Trio No. 4 (Dvořák) =

Composition by Antonín Dvořák

Piano Trio in E minor
- No. 4, Dumky
- by Antonín Dvořák
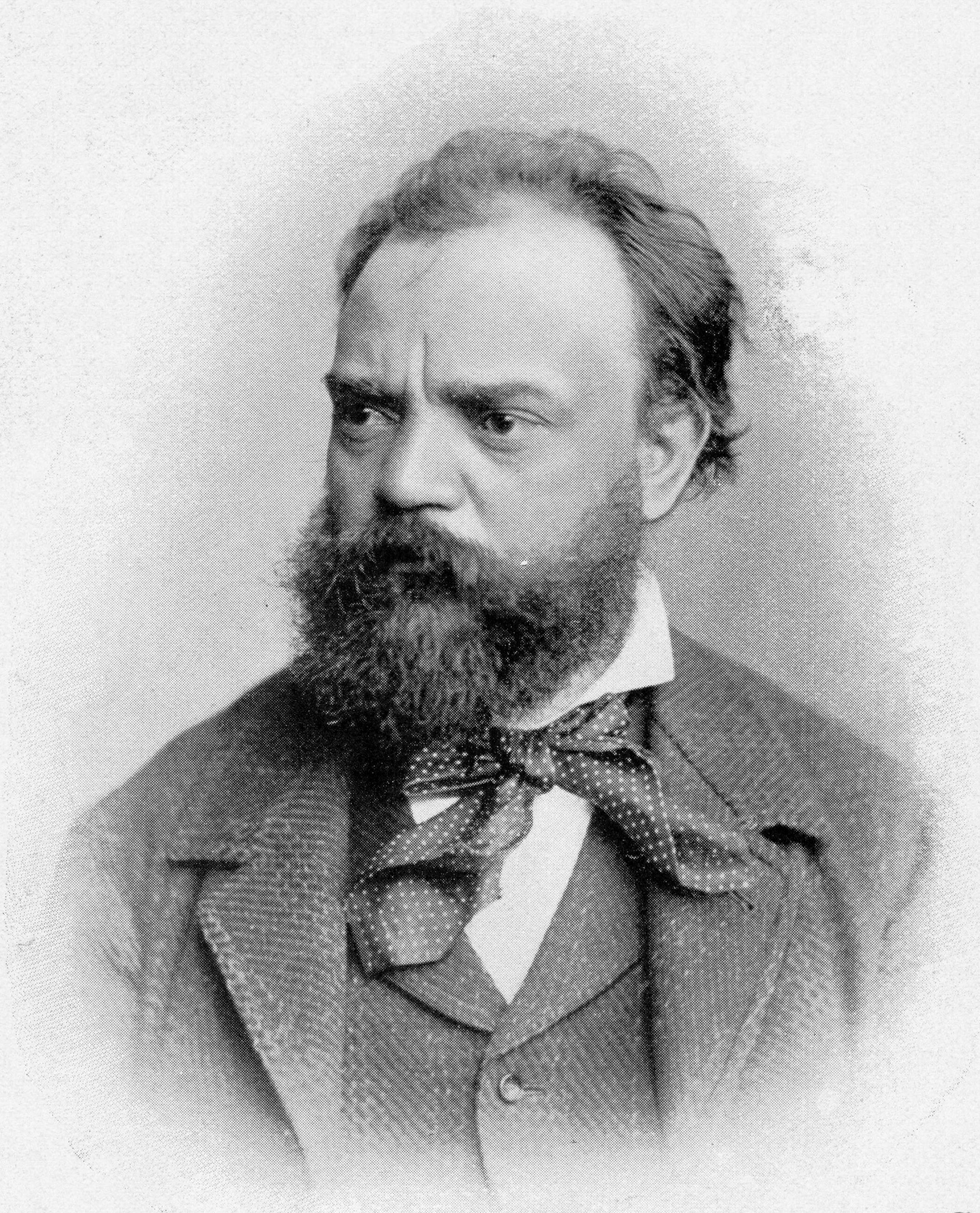
- The composer in 1882
- Key: E minor
- Catalogue: B. 166
- Opus: 90
- Composed: 1891
- Movements: 6

Premiere
- Date: 11 April 1891
- Location: Prague

The Piano Trio No. 4 in E minor, Op. 90, B. 166 (also called the Dumky trio from the subtitle Dumky) is a composition by Antonín Dvořák for piano, violin and cello. It is among the composer's best-known works.

It is also a well-known example of chamber music that significantly deviates from the traditional structure of classical chamber music, in terms of both the number of movements and the formal organization of those movements.

== Title ==
Dumky, the plural form of dumka, is a Ukrainian term. Originally, it is the diminutive form of the term Duma, plural dumy, which refers to epic ballads, specifically a song or lament of captive people. During the nineteenth century, composers from other Slavic countries began using the duma as a classical form to indicate a brooding, introspective composition with cheerful sections interspersed within. Dvořák used the dumka form in several other compositions, including his Dumka for Solo Piano, Op. 35; Slavonic Dance No. 2; String Sextet; and his Piano Quintet, Op. 81.

== History ==
Dvořák completed the trio on 12 February 1891. It premiered in Prague on 11 April 1891, with violinist Ferdinand Lachner, cellist Hanuš Wihan, and Dvořák himself on piano. The performance was to celebrate that Prague's Charles University awarded the composer an honorary doctorate earlier that year on 17 March 1891. The work was so well received that Dvořák performed it on his forty-concert farewell tour throughout Moravia and Bohemia, just before he left for the United States to head the National Conservatory of Music of America in New York City. The trio was published while Dvořák was in America and was proofread by his friend Johannes Brahms.

Dvořák may have become familiar with dumka through Janáček, whose choral Zpěvná duma jwIV/10 was written in 1876, and through Kocipiński’s collection Songs, ‘dumki’ and ‘shumki’ of the Russian Nation in Podoli, Ukraine and Little Russia, 1862.

== Structure ==
The piece is in six sections:

1. Lento maestoso — Allegro quasi doppio movimento (E minor – E major)
2. Poco adagio — Vivace non troppo — Vivace (C♯ minor)
3. Andante — Vivace non troppo — Allegretto (A major – A minor – A major)
4. Andante moderato — Allegretto scherzando — Quasi tempo di marcia (D minor – D major)
5. Allegro (E♭ major – E♭ minor)
6. Lento maestoso (C minor – C major)

The composition features six dumky episodes throughout. The initial three dumky are connected together without interruption in the harmonically complementary keys given above, in effect forming a long first movement. The final three dumky are presented in unrelated keys, thus giving the overall impression of a four-movement structure. The sectional structure of each episode contains contrasting pensive, melancholic sections and faster sections, suggesting the relationship of the music to folk practice and mirroring the piece to the Ukrainian dumka–shumka contrast.

Music critic Daniel Felsenfeld describes the form as follows:

The form of the piece is structurally simple but emotionally complicated, being an uninhibited Bohemian lament. Considered essentially formless, at least by classical standards, it is more like a six movement dark fantasia—completely original and successful, a benchmark piece for the composer. Being completely free of the rigors of sonata form gave Dvořák license to take the movements to some dizzying, heavy, places, able to be both brooding and yet somehow, through it all, a little lighthearted.

Musicologists Derek Katz and Michael Beckerman observe, "Whereas in the quintet [Op. 81] he had borrowed a plan from Schumann to mold his dumka into a quasi-traditional framework, here he allows each of the six dumky to stand fully realized on its own."

== Discography ==
- Dvořák: Piano Trios, Op. 65 & 90 "Dumky", Max Brod Trio, AUD 703 1682-2 MDG - Musikproduktion Dabringhaus und Grimm (2011), www.mdg.de
- Dvořák, Suk, Shostakovich: Piano Trios. Ahn Trio, EMI Music Germany (1998)
- Dumka No. 5, with Itzhak Perlman, Yo-Yo Ma and Rudolf Firkušný, Sony CD (1994) and Kultur DVD (2007)
- Dvořák: Piano Trios, Op. 65 & 90 "Dumky". Busch Trio, consisting of Mathieu van Bellen (vn), Ori Epstein (vc), Omri Epstein (pf). Alpha Classics (2016)
- Dvořák: Piano Trios Nos. 3 & 4. Christian Tetzlaff (vn), Tanja Tetzlaff (vc), Lars Vogt (pf). Ondine (2018)
