= Violin Concerto (Dvořák) =

Concerto composed by Antonín Dvořák

- by Antonín Dvořák
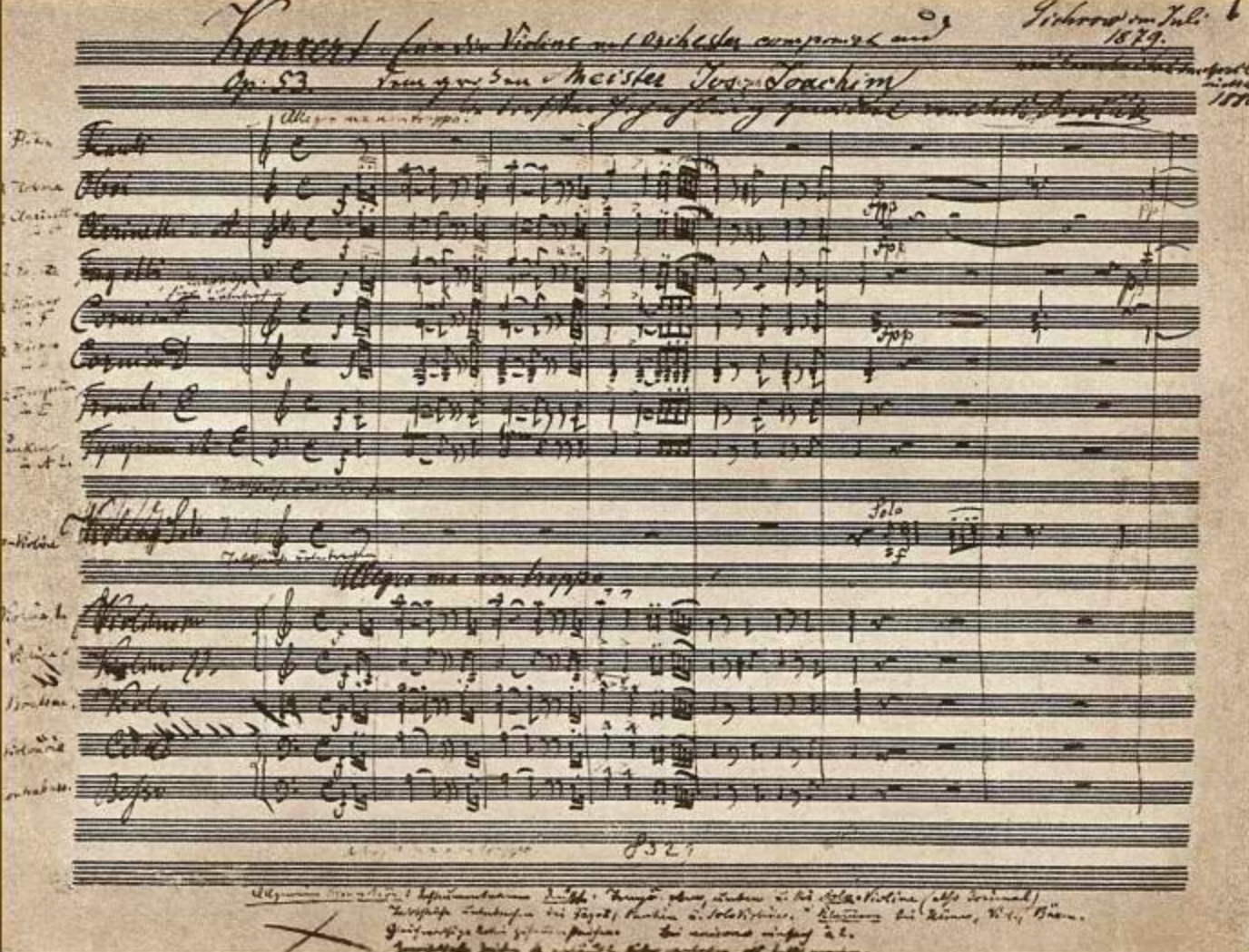
- First page of autograph manuscript
- Key: A minor
- Opus: 53
- Period: Romantic
- Composed: 1879
- Movements: 3
- Scoring: Violin and orchestra

Premiere
- Date: 1883
- Location: Prague

The Violin Concerto in A minor, Op. 53 (B. 96 / B. 108), is a violin concerto composed by Antonín Dvořák in 1879. It was premiered in Prague on 14 October 1883.

== History ==
Dvořák was encouraged to write a violin concerto by his publisher Simrock, after compositions such as Slavonic Dances and his Symphony No. 6 had been successful. The composer sought advice from the violinist Joseph Joachim, the director of the Musikhochschule Berlin, who had played his chamber music in concerts, including the world premiere of his String Sextet in A major. Dvořák composed the work with the intention of dedicating it to him, and hoped for a premiere played by Joachim.

Dvořák composed a first sketch in July 1879 that already contained the themes of the final version. He took it to Berlin at the end of the month where Joachim had staged a gala evening in his honour. Joachim recommended formal changes which Dvořák made over the following two months. In November he mailed the work to Joachim with a dedication on the title page: "I dedicate this work to the great Maestro Jos. Joachim, with the deepest respect, Ant. Dvořák." He requested Joachim's opinion, and the violinist replied that he was busy but would look into it as soon as possible.

No written reply from Joachim has survived, but Dvořák visited Joachim in Berlin in the spring of 1880. After the consultation, the composer rewrote the concerto between April and May. Joachim, a strict classicist, may have objected to the abrupt truncation of the first movement's orchestral tutti, the short recapitulation, and the persistent repetition found in the third movement. Dvořák sent the new version to Joachim for inspection, but had to wait more than two years for an answer.

The violin concerto was premiered in Prague on 14 October 1883 conducted by Mořic Stanislav Anger with the solo part played by František Ondříček, who also gave the Vienna and London premieres. The concerto was first performed in the United States on 30 October 1891, at the Auditorium Theatre in Chicago. Max Bendix was soloist with the Chicago Orchestra led by Theodore Thomas. The concerto remains an important work in the violin repertoire.

== Music ==
I. Allegro ma non troppo

II. Adagio ma non troppo

III. Allegro giocoso ma non troppo
Performed by Staff Sgt. Karen Johnson and the United States Marine Chamber Orchestra, under the baton of Major Michelle Rakers

The concerto is scored for solo violin and an orchestra consisting of two flutes, two oboes, two clarinets (in A), two bassoons, four horns, two trumpets, timpani, and strings.

The structure of the concerto is the classical three movements, fast–slow–fast.

1. Allegro ma non troppo (A minor)
2. Adagio ma non troppo (F major)
3. Finale: Allegro giocoso ma non troppo (A major)

The first movement and the second movement are interconnected (attacca subito).

== Selected recordings ==
- Augustin Hadelich: Bohemian Tales – with the Bavarian Radio Orchestra, conducted by Jakub Hrůša
