= Furiant =

Bohemian dance

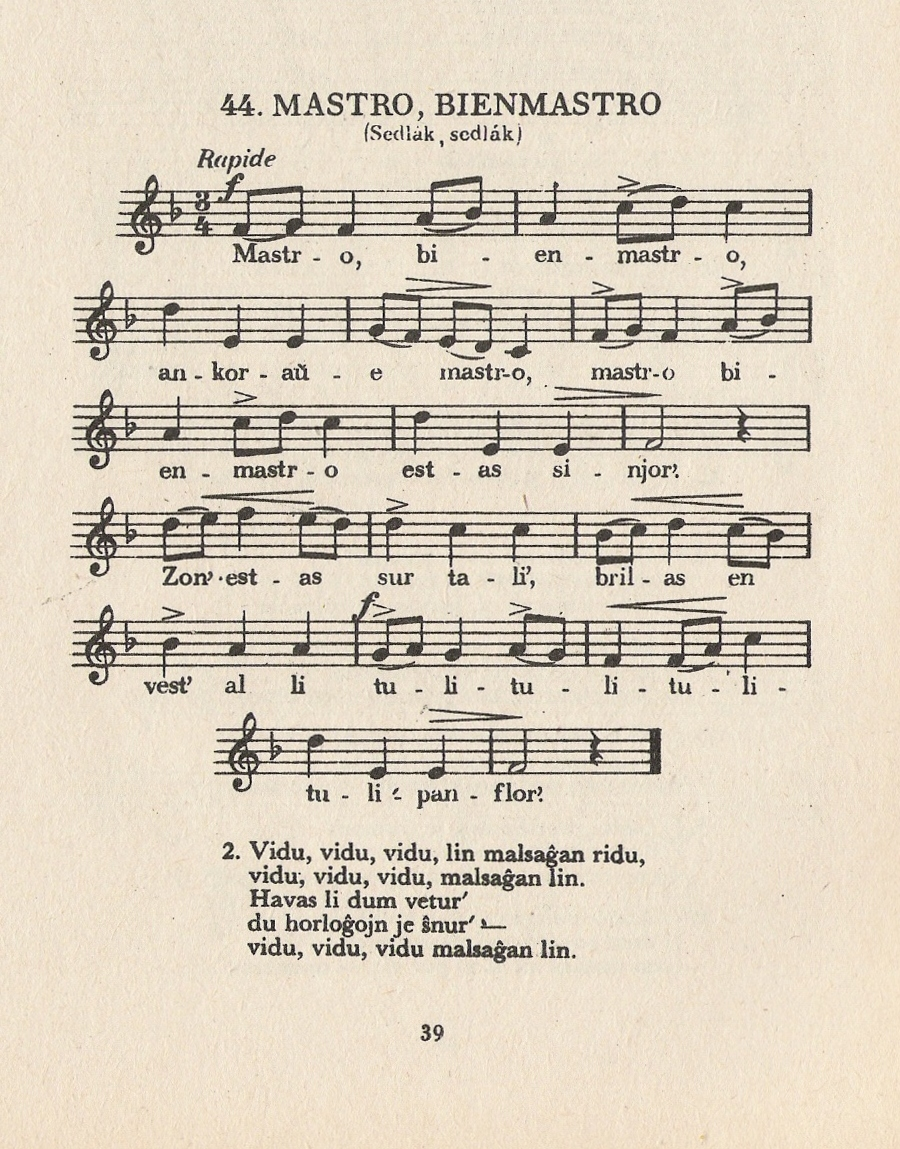
- Melody and Esperanto translation of the folksong "Sedlák, sedlák, sedlák"
- Genre: Classical music, Czech folk music
- Time signature: 3/4
- Year: 19th century
- Origin: Bohemia
- Related dances: Sousedská, Polka, Ländler

A furiant is a Bohemian folk dance characterized by its rapid tempo and usage of irregular changing rhythms, hemiolas and syncopation. (Note: Yeomans (2006). p. 97.) Furiants are usually written in the time signature 3/4, with off-beat accents that divide their first two measures into three duple units (2/4). The furiant is danced in pairs. The dance became very popular in Bohemia during the 19th century, and many Czech composers such as Antonín Dvořák and Bedřich Smetana wrote furiants in their compositions.

== Etymology ==
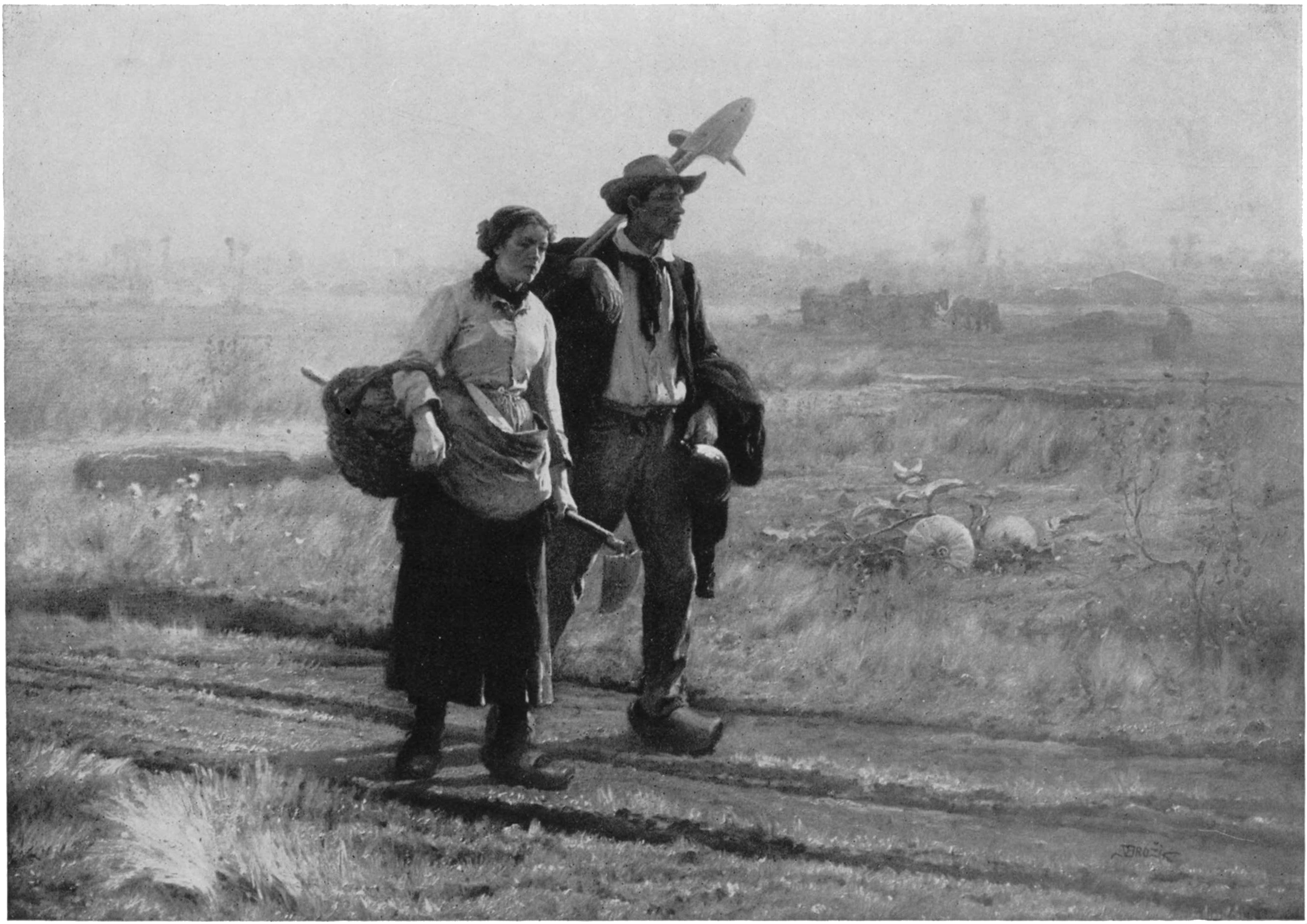
Drawing of Peasants proceeding to their work by Václav Brožík, (1851–1901).

Besides the dance, the word is also used in the Czech language to describe a stubborn, arrogant, boastful person with bloated self-confidence. The word is recorded in the Czech language since the end of the 18th century, then meaning "a rebel" or "a disturber of peace". In this meaning, it appears in Jan Antoš' 1777 opera "De Rebellione Boemica Rusticorum" (Note: In Latin: on the Bohemian Peasant Rebellion) and in the ballad "Chvála sedláků", (Note: In Czech: In praise of the Farmers) also from the 1770s. (Note: Tyrrel (2001).) (Note: "Furiant", in Smolka, J., ed. (1997). Slovník české hudební kultury [Dictionary of Czech musical culture] (in Czech). Prague: Supraphon. p. 236. ISBN 9788070584620.)

It is unclear how the dance became known under the name "Furiant", and the origin of its name is controversial. John Paul Bohumil Dudek suggested the word comes from the Latin word furians, through one way or another. In Bohemia, Farmers were often attributed with attributes connected to the word in its other meanings in Czech, including unrest, hubris, and arrogance (for example, in Ladislav Stroupežnický's 1887 play "Naši furianti"); It is possible that the close connection between the dance and farmers has led to the dance' naming. Moreover, other Bohemian folkdances with mixed meter were also termed with related names such as the "Sedlák" (farmer) or the "Kozel" (billy goat). (Note: Tyllner (2021). p. 222.) Ladislav Urban wrote in his book "The Music of Bohemia" (1919):

Besides the Polka, there is another Czech folk-dance with characteristic wild rhythm: The Furiant, which means a boasting farmer.

— Urban, L. (1919). The Music of Bohemia. Part I. p. 21. Czechoslovak Arts Club of New York City; D. B. Updike, The Merrymount Press.

Other explanations for the name were suggested as well: Jaroslav Markl proposed the word arrived through French influence during the Napoleonic wars, and a possible connection to an earlier German dance by the name "Furie" was proposed as well in German circles. A dance in the that name is found in Johann Joachim Quantz's Versuch einer Anweisung die Flöte traversiere zu spielen (1752) and in Daniel Gottlob Türk's Klavierschule (1789).

== In folk music ==
Sedlák, sedlák, sedlák

Sedlák, sedlák, sedlák, ješte jednou sedlák. sedlák, sedlák, sedlák, je velký pán; on má pás na břiše a na svém kožiše tuli-, tuli-, tuli-, tu-, tulipán …

Ta jeho Mařena, ta je obdařena samej-, samej-, samej- ma dukátama.

and around Klatovy also

Koukej, koukej, koukej, jak je sedlák hloupej, koukej, koukej, koukej, jak je hloupej: on jede na pole, má hodinky dvoje; koukej, koukej, koukej, jak je hloupej.

— words as found in Link (1883), p. 51 (Note: The song translated: Farmer, farmer, farmer, once again farmer, farmer, farmer, farmer, he is a grand man: he has a belt around his belly, and on his fur coat is a tulip, tulip, tulip, tu-tulipán. That farmer’s wife, she is endowed, with nothing but, nothing but, nothing but, tons of ducats. Look, look, look, how foolish the farmer is, look, look, look, how foolish he is: he goes to the field, he has two watches; look, look, look, how foolish he is.)

The furiant was popular all across Bohemia during the 19th century. (Note: Beveridge (2018). pp. 18–19) (Note: Tyllner (2021). pp. 221–222) Folk dances with mixed meter were common in Bohemia, Moravia, Slovakia, and Bavaria, and there are many variations of those dances under various names and internal time unit divisions. The typical furiant is divided into three duple (2/4) units and then two triple units (3/4), forming the complex meter 2+2+2+3+3/4. Some similar folk dances are even recorded under the same name in the same ethnomusicological subregion with different internal time divisions, e.g. the Latovák is recorded in Loketsko (around Loket) in both 2+2+3+3/4 and 3+3+2+2/4 time. In the broadest sense, the word Furiant can even describe fast folk tunes in an entirely triple meter. (Note: Beveridge (2018). p. 17)

The furiant is closely connected to farmers, and mocks the smug arrogance that was associated with them in Bohemian culture. (Note: Nettl, P. (1947). The Story of Dance Music. New York: Philosophical Library. p. 296. ISBN 9780598739551.) The male dancer imitates a proud farmer that chases and courts the female dancer; he jumps and stomps in accordance with the beats, hands placed on his waists or taking off his coat. The female dancer steps in a much lighter manner, circling before and around the male dancer, and in place. Afterwards, the male dancer places his hands on the female dancer's sides, and the dance together as in a Ländler or a Sousedská. (Note: Link (1883), p. 50)

The folksongs the furiant is danced to are also light and humorous, often ridiculing farmers and their pride as well. (Note: Shinsky (2023). p, 8.) The song "Sedlák, sedlák, sedlák", for instance, calls the farmer "a big man", and in the Klatovsko ethnomusicological subregion (around Klatovy), calls him foolish (hloupý) directly. (Note: Link (1883). p. 51) This song was first recorded by Karel Jaromír Erben in 1842,, and aided Bedřich Smetana in writing both of his furiants. (Note: Large (1970). pp. 339–341)

The songs accompanying the furiant dance use three disyllabic words during the characteristic hemiola, and often it is the same word repeating thrice. (Note: Laudová (1994). pp. 8, 112.) Many folk tunes passed through the generations with no record of their authors, (Note: Shinsky (2023). p. 7.) although one was found in the archives of the czech kapellmeister and composer Jiří Josef Benedikt Hartl, among the many other folkdance tunes he composed. (Note: Shinsky (2023). pp. 7–8.) Most folk tunes have eight-measures long phrases, but others, like "Vosy vosy vosy" and "Houvej houvej houvej", differ from that formula. (Note: Laudová (1994). p. 15.)

=== Cultural heritage and origin ===
Map of the historical regions of the Czech Republic: Bohemia Moravia Czech Silesia

Areas where the main everyday language was German, per the 1910 Austro-Hungarian census

The Furiant was common among Bohemian Czechs and Germans alike, and its ethnic origins are under controversy. (Note: Tyllner (2021). p. 221) German theorists have suggested that its roots are in an earlier German dance called 'Furie', as recorded by Türk (1789) and Quantz (1752). John Tyrrell (2001) rejects the hypothesis, claiming that unlike the furious nature of the Furie and the dance in classical music, the earliest Czech records of the furiant describe it as a light, humorous dance in a moderate tempo. The most recognizable furiant folk tune, the one used in "Sedlák, sedlák, sedlák", was first recorded by Jan Ritter von Rittersberg in the folksong collection "České národní písně" (1825), with German words. That is the earliest known folksong that is explicitly called a furiant and has the characteristic hemiolaic structure. Also, similar polyrhythmic dances were recorded in Bavaria, and it is unclear whether the Slavs influenced the Bavarians, or if it is the Slavs that got the dance from the Germans.

Despite the dispute as to its origins, the furiant is connected to the Czech culture and especially to Czech classical music. The dance is connected to classical Czech music in large part due to the works of the composers Smetana and Dvořák, even outside of the Czech Republic. During the 19th century, as it developed, the Czech national movement sought to anchor its national identity in music, and Bohemian and Moravian folk music was hence adopted by the movement. The furiant, which was greatly popularized in the Czech Republic after Smetana's the Bartered Bride, became a national dance together with the sousedska. It was compiled into the ballroom dance Česká beseda by the choreograph Karel link and the composer Ferdinand Heller as well. (Note: Link (1883). pp. 23, 26, 31, 34, 40–42)

== In classical music ==
In classical music, the furiant is characterized by a rapid tempo, sometimes described as fiery or lively, similarly to the description of the furiant in Türk's Klavierschule. Compositions under the name "Furiant" were heavily influenced by the works of Smetana and Dvořák. Smetana wrote two furiants: one in his opera The Bartered Bride, and one in his Czech dances. (Note: Tyllner (2021). pp. 220)

=== In Smetana's The Bartered Bride ===
Sedlák, sedlák, sedlák
Digitized off Link (1883), aux. pp. 1–2

Furiant, from The Bartered Bride
Performed by the United States Marine Band

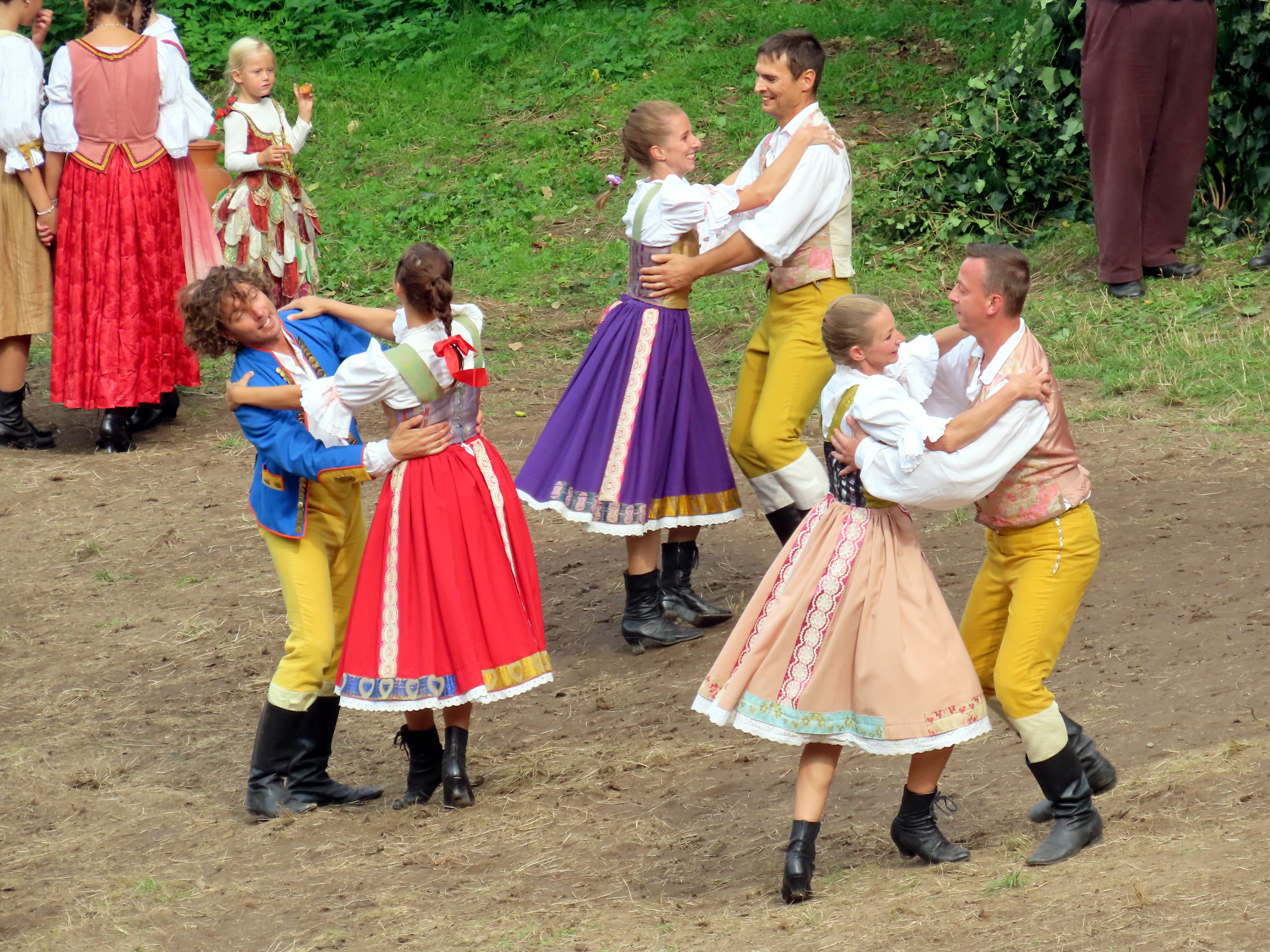
Actors dancing, from The Bartered Bride, Opera v Šárce, September 3, 2023

The Bartered Bride is Smetana's second opera (Note: Though Smetana started composing what that would become The Bartered Bride before the Brandenburgers in Bohemia, the latter was completed first, and so The Brandenburgers in Bohemia is considered Smetana's first opera, and The Bartered Bride is considered his second.) in three acts, to a libretto by Karel Sabina. (Note: Large (1970). pp. 160–161) Smetana completed his draft for the piano during October 1865, and following The Brandenburgers in Bohemia's success in February of 1866, he orchestrated The Bartered Bride and completed the first version of the opera on March 16th, then in two acts. (Note: Large (1970). p. 164) The opera first aired on May 30, 1866, and went through a series of rewrites until its fifth and last revision of September 25, 1870. (Note: Large (1970). p. 399)

A furiant was added to the opera in its fourth revision, airing on June 1, 1869, together with the rewriting of the play to three acts. (Note: Large (1970). pp. 169, 399) It originally appeared close to the polka, at the end of the first act, (Note: Large (1970). p. 169) but it was eventually relocated as the second musical number of the second act, right after the song To pivečko. (Note: Large (1970). p. 171) Smetana based this furiant after the folksong Sedlák, sedlák, sedlák, (Note: Large (1970). p. 186) added an original intro and harmonic accompaniment, transposed it from G major to F major, and increased the tempo to its fast and energetic tempo speed the dance is known for in classical music. Out of the three dances in the opera, the furiant is the only one whose melody was based on a real folk tune.

=== In Dvořák's Slavonic Dances ===
Antonín Dvořák's Slavonic Dances are 16 compositions in the form of Slavic folk dances, grouped in two separate volumes (Op. 46, Op. 72). (Note: Honolka (2005). p. 146) These dances are among Dvořák's most famous works. In the first volume, both the first dance (in C major) and the eighth and last dance (in G minor) are furiants. The Slavonic Dances were composed per the request of Dvořák's publisher at the time, Fritz Simrock, in 1878. Following the success of Johannes Brahms's Hungarian Dances, Simrock requested Dvořák to composed a similar set of dances for piano in four hands, but with a Slavonic inspiration. Dvořák wrote his dances to the piano and orchestrated them in the same year of 1878. Unlike Brahms, who based his dances on traditional Hungarian folk tunes, Dvořák composed new original melodies to all his Slavonic Dances. (Note: Honolka (2005). pp. 45–47)

=== In Smetana's Czech Dances ===
Smetana's Czech Dances were also published in two volumes. The first of them was composed during August 1877 and contained four polkas. (Note: Large (1970). pp. 337–338) A year later, in August 1878, Smetana received a copy of Dvořák's Slavonic Dances from his friend František Bayer, which inspired Smetana to compose his second volume of Czech Dances in 1879. Smetana criticized Dvořák's decision to publish his dances under the vague title "Slavonic Dances", and explicitly requested his publisher, Urbanek, to add the exact names of each dance alongside each of his tunes. The second volume of Czech Dances opens with a furiant, who Smetana based on "Sedlák, sedlák, sedlák" as well, this time sticking less closely to the source material. This furiant is structured in an A-B-A-Coda manner. Its A part starts with a dramatic, rising melody that proceeds a main theme that starts with five duple units (2/4) in a row.

=== In other works ===
First main theme in Dvořák's Sixth Symphony

Antonín Dvořák continued to compose many furiants after his Slavonic Dances. Already in the same year of 1878, he composed three more: Two furiants in D and F major Op. 42 B. 85, and the Presto movement in his String Sextet in A major Op. 48 B. 80. (Note: Honolka (2005). pp. 147, 150) In 1879, he composed his Czech Suite Op. 39 b. 93, whose last movement is a furiant. (Note: Honolka (2005). pp. 48, 146) In 1882, he wrote the third and final movement of his Violin Concerto Op. 53 as a furiant. The furiant from his Dumka and Furiant for piano Op. 12/2 B. 137 (1884) was numbered as the second of the two dances, despite being composed before the Dumka. In his Second Piano Quintet in A major Op. 81 B. 155 (1887), the third movement is titled Scherzo, with the name "Furiant" appearing only in parentheses. This movement indeed lacks the characteristic rhythm and sharp switches between 2/4 and 3/4 of a furiant. In 1889, Dvořák wrote his seventh Poetic Tone Picture Op. 85 as a furiant. This movement is one of the most technically hard among Dvořák's Poetic Tone Pictures.

Dvořák also used the furiant in the third movement of three of his symphonies (in his Sixth, B. 112, Op. 60 (1880); in his Seventh, B. 141, Op. 70 (1885); in his Ninth, B. 178, Op. 95). In his Sixth Symphony's Scherzo, Dvořák used a rhythmic change in several manners: the first main theme flips between 3/4 and 3/2 repeatedly, and the second main theme uses simultaneously, 3/4 in the low voices and 3/2 in the high. The Trio is slower and calmer, and its 3/4 stays unchanged until its end, after which the timpani and violas play in 3/2 against the rest of the orchestra, who uses the 3/4 time signature.

Digitized version of Furiant for Harp Op. 77 by Hanuš Trneček

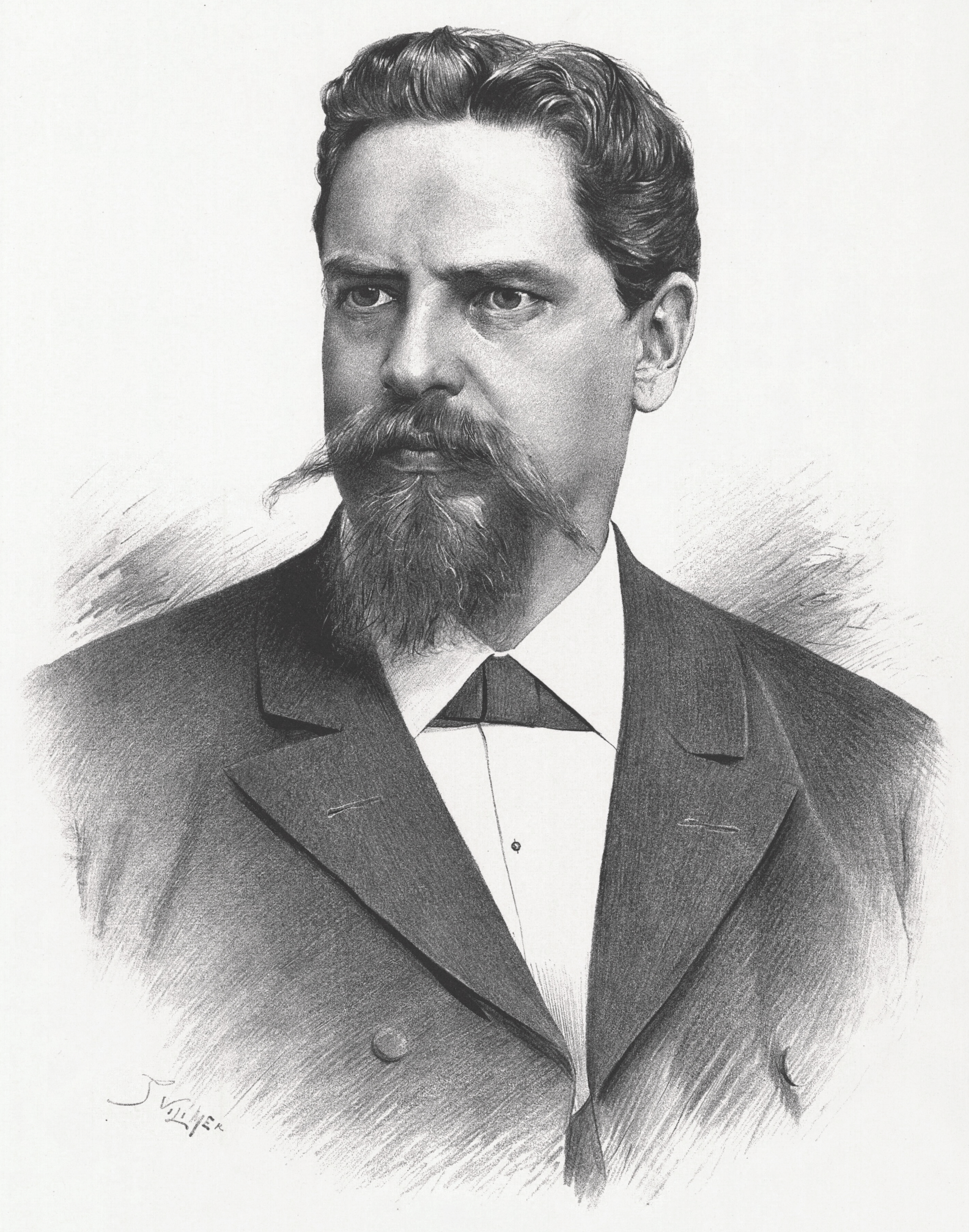
A portrait of Zdeněk Fibich

Besides Bedřich Smetana and Antonín Dvořák, other classical composers, such as Ernst von Dohnányi (1895), (Note: Piano Quintet in C minor Op. 1, second movement) Bedřich Křídlo (1900), (Note: Czech Dances for Piano in Four Hands Op. 7, second movement) Hanuš Trneček (1900), (Note: Furiant for Harp Op. 77) and Bohuslav Martinů (1917) (Note: Furiant for Piano H. 109) wrote their own furiants. Zdeněk Fibich, Smetana's and Dvořák's cosmopolitan contemporary, (Note: Yeomans (2006). p. 95.) composed two furiants: the third movement of his Sonata for Piano, and piece no. 59 in his Moods, Impressions and Souvenirs Op. 47 (1897). These furiants are two of Fibich's only pieces composed as a typical Czech folkdance, as Fibich usually composed in a manner more typical of his romantic contemporaries in Germany and Poland.

Vítězslav Novák composed two furiants as well: the third dance of his Three Bohemian Dances for Piano in Four Hands Op. 15 in 1897, and the second dance in his Three dances from the Youth suite Op. 55 in 1920. Novák later orchestrated the latter in 1943 as well. The former was written as a virtuosic finale for the dance triplet. It opens with an introductory toccata and an unusually long chain of hemiolas. The main theme is subdivided internally as four triple units, three duple units in a hemiola, and two more triple units: 3+3+3+3+2+2+2+3+3/4. On its first repeat, the theme becomes a toccata too, which appears again by the end of the composition.

Erwin Schulhoff wrote the second movement of his Concertino for Flute, Viola and Contrabass WV 75 as a furiant in 1926. This is the longest movement in the piece and it is written in the quintuple meter atypical of a furiant. The internal subdivision to duple and triple units is irregular and changing across the movement.

Jaromir Weinberger added a furiant to his opera Švanda the Bagpiper (1927). The turbulent, volatile dance is used in the scene in which Dorotka, Švanda's wife, confronts him, and attacks him for his irresponsibility and unfaithfulness to her. When she finally asks if Švanda kissed the queen, he answers that if he did, may he go to hell, and finds himself summoned there in an instant.

Adam Gorb wrote the second movement of his Bohemian Revelry (2013) as a furiant. Its structure is A-B-A-Coda. This furiant has four main themes, three of which use unusual phrase lengths: the first theme is 10 bars long, the second is 18 bars long, and the third is 7 bars long. The last theme is 4 bars long, and is repeated in a canon at the end of the furiant's B section.

== Sources ==
- Beveridge, D. R. (2018). "Antonín Dvořák and the concept of Czechness" (PDF). Clavibus Unitis. 7 (1): 11–26.
- Honolka, K. (2005). Dvořák. Translated by Wyburd, A. off German (English ed.). Haus Publishing. ISBN 9781904341529.
- Laudová, H. (1994). Lidové tance z Čech, Moravy a Slezska. Díl I: Západní Čechy (Guide to the dances of Bohemia, Moravia and Silesia. Part 1: West Bohemia) (in Czech). Strážnice: Ústav lidové kultury.
- Large, B. (1970). Smetana. New York: Praeger.
- Link, K. (1883). Beseda, cesky salonni tanec: s tancepisnou taulkou a s prilohou hudebni (in Czech). Prague: Storch.
- Shinsky, M. D. (2023). American nationalistic music: Dvorak's influence (masters thesis). Liberty University.
- Tyllner, L. (2021). "Indigenous People and Traditional Music in the Historical Context of the Czech Lands". In Lu, Y. Hs.; Elschek, O. (eds.). The Legacy of Indigenous Music:Asian and European Perspectives. Sinophone and Taiwan Studies. Vol. 4. Singapore: Springer. pp. 215–239. doi:10.1007/978-981-16-4473-3_9. ISBN 9780253218452.
- Tyrrell, J. (2001). "Furiant". Grove Music Online. Oxford University Press. doi:10.1093/gmo/9781561592630.article.10395. ISBN 978-1-56159-263-0.
- Yeomans, D. (2006). Piano music of the Czech romantics: A performer's guide (third ed.). Indiana University Press. ISBN 9780253218452.
