= Czech Suite (Dvořák) =

1879 composition by Antonín Dvořák

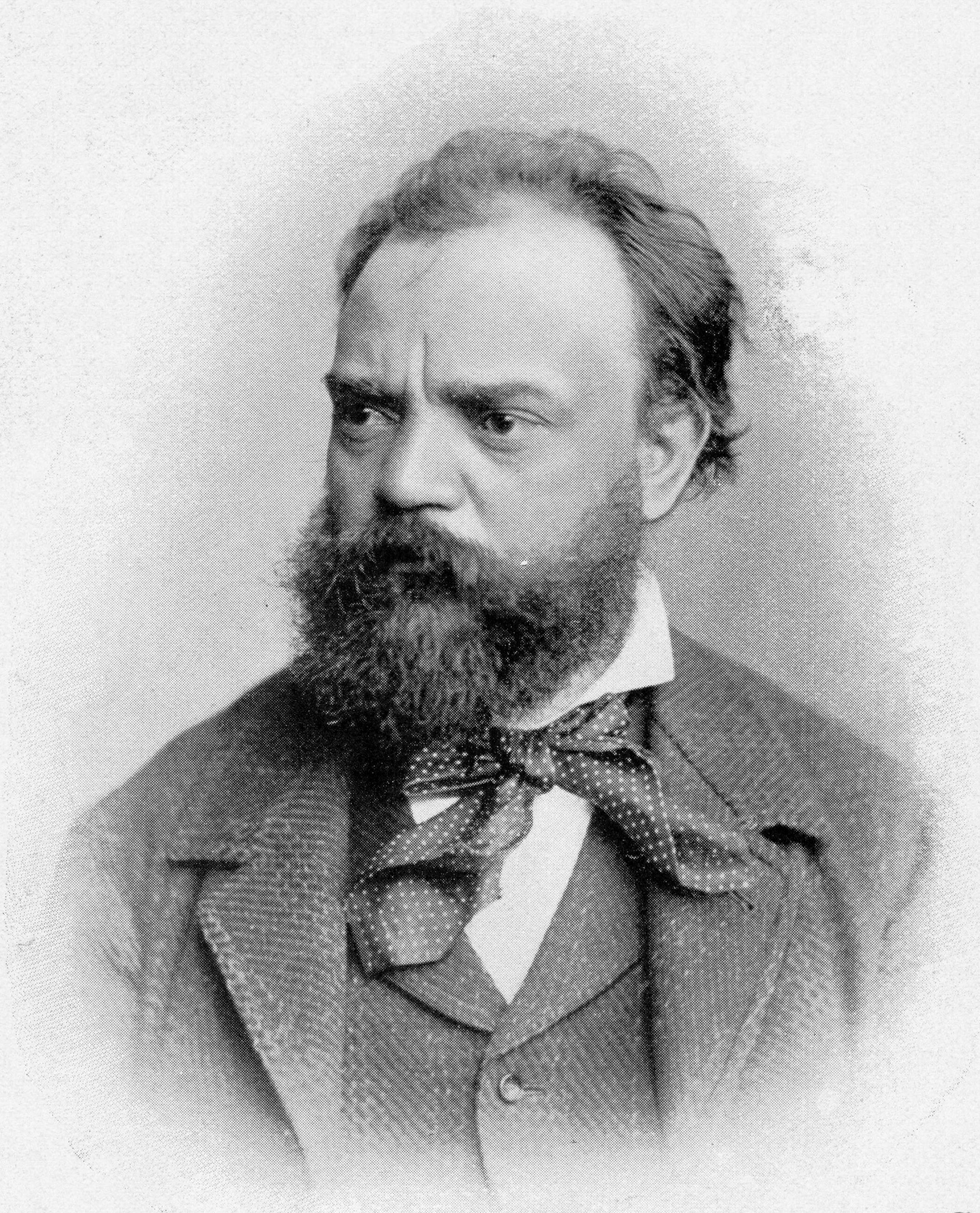
Antonín Dvořák in 1882

The Czech Suite in D major (Czech: Česká suita D dur), Op. 39 (B. 93), was composed by Antonín Dvořák in 1879 and published later in his life. Adolf Čech conducted the premiere.

Dvořák had only recently become introduced to Fritz Simrock by Johannes Brahms but had already become displeased with several of his new publisher's business practices, including releasing older works with high opus numbers, implying they were new. He offered this work, recently written, to Simrock with a somewhat earlier number (that of works he'd written a few years before) as part of his response.

The suite consists of five movements as follows:

1. Preludium (Pastorale): Allegro moderato (D major)
2. Polka: Allegretto grazioso (D minor)
3. Sousedská (Minuetto): Allegro giusto (B♭ major)
4. Romance: Andante con moto (G major)
5. Finale (Furiant): Presto (D minor)

== Performance history ==
List of notable performances of Dvořák's Czech Suite.

- Prague, Austria-Hungary: 16 May 1879, conducted by Adolf Čech
- Prague, Austria-Hungary: 29 March 1880, conducted by Dvořák himself
