= String Sextet (Dvořák) =

- by Antonín Dvořák
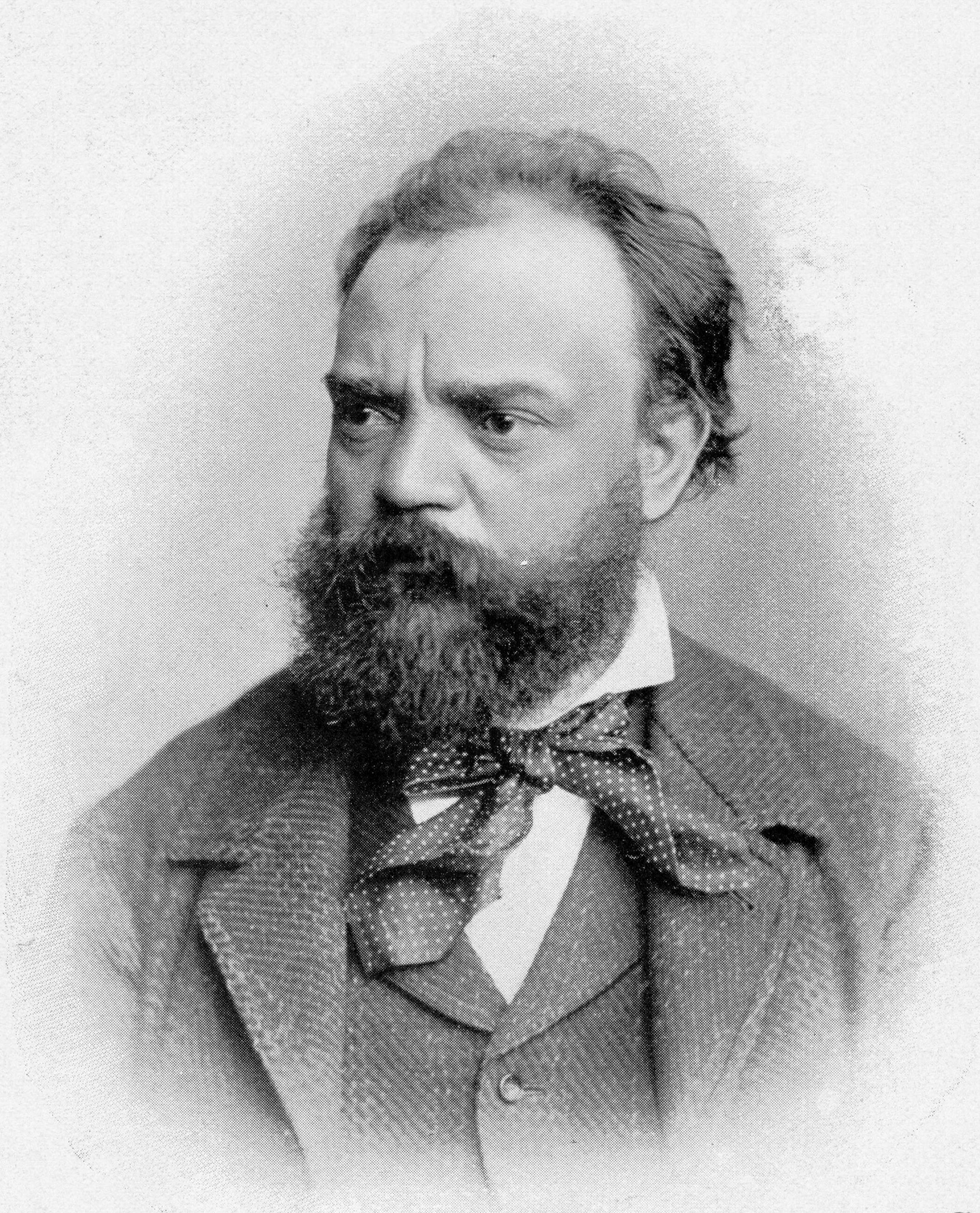
- Dvořák in 1882
- Opus: 48
- Composed: 1878
- Published: 1879
- Movements: 4

Premiere
- Date: 9 November 1879
- Location: Berlin

Antonín Dvořák´s String Sextet in A major, Op. 48, (B. 80) for two violins, two violas and two cellos was composed for the most part in May 1878. It was Dvořák's first work to be premiered outside Bohemia.

== History ==
The period 1875–79 was very important in Dvořák's life. The composer received government grants in that time, which enabled him to concentrate solely on composing. A sense of responsibility led him to hard and prolific work, and one of the results of his activity was the String Sextet.

Dvořák's German publisher Simrock offered the work to his friend and collaborator Joseph Joachim (famous violinist and leader of a string quartet), and he together with other artists (the Joachim Quartet (Joseph Joachim, Heinrich de Ahna, Emanuel Wirth, Robert Hausmann), with Heinrich Jacobsen and Hugo Dechert) performed the work privately on 19 July 1879. The composer was present and was enchanted by the performance. The next day he wrote to his friend Alois Göbl: "...Joachim waited with eagerness for my arrival and even organized a soirée for my sake. During the celebration they played my new quartet and sextet. They played with great understanding and enthusiasm..." Joachim and colleagues gave the public premiere of the work in Berlin on 9 November 1879. A few months later, in February and March 1880, they also performed it in London.

The composition was published by Fritz Simrock in 1879; the critical edition of the work was printed in 1957.

== Structure ==
The composition consists of four movements:

1. Allegro — Moderato
2. Dumka. Poco allegretto
3. Furiant. Presto
4. Finale. Tema con variazioni. Allegretto grazioso, quasi andantino

The work was composed at the same time as the Slavonic Rhapsodies (Op. 45) and Slavonic Dances (Op. 46). Written in similar style, it can also be called "Slavonic". Two inner movements are partly stylisations of the dumka and partly of the folk furiant. The first movement is written in the sonata form, and the last part is composed in the form of variations, in a soft, meditative mood.

== Selected recordings ==
- String Quintet No. 2, String Sextet. Supraphon 1992. (11 1461-2 131). (Panocha Quartet)
