= Dumka (musical genre) =

Music genre

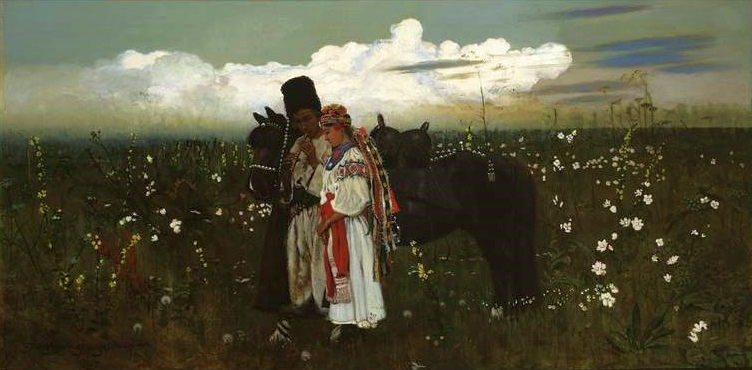
Jarema's dumka (1879), a painting by Stanisław Masłowski in the National Museum in Warsaw.

Rhapsody No.2 on folk motives by Lysenko, inspired by the popular genre of dumka

Dumka (Ukrainian: думка, romanized: dúmka, plural думки, dúmky) is a musical term introduced from the Ukrainian language, with cognates in other Slavic languages. The word dumka literally means "thought". Originally, it was the diminutive form of the Ukrainian term (loanword from Polish) duma, pl. dumy, "a Slavic (specifically Ukrainian) epic ballad … generally thoughtful or melancholic in character". Classical composers drew on the harmonic patterns in the folk music to inform their more formal classical compositions.

The composition of dumky became popular after the publication of an ethnological study and analysis and a number of illustrated lectures made by the Ukrainian composer Mykola Lysenko in 1873 and 1874 in Kyiv and Saint Petersburg. They were illustrated by live performances by the blind kobzar Ostap Veresai, who performed a number of dumky, singing and accompanying himself on the bandura. Lysenko's study was the first to specifically analyse the melodies and the accompaniment played on the bandura, kobza or lira of the epic dumy.

A natural part of the process of transferring the traditional folk form to a formal classical milieu was the appropriation of the dumka form by Slavic composers, most especially by the Czech composer Antonín Dvořák. Thus, in classical music, dumka came to mean "a type of instrumental music involving sudden changes from melancholy to exuberance". Though dumky are generally characterized by a gently plodding, dreamy duple rhythm, many examples are in triple metre, including Dvořák's Slavonic dance (Op. 72 No. 4). His last and best-known piano trio, No. 4 in E minor, Op. 90, has six movements, each of which is a dumka; the work is often referred to by its subtitle, Dumky Trio.

== Examples ==
Major examples in the classical repertoire include:

=== Stanisław Moniuszko ===
- Jontek's aria from the opera Halka (1858)
- Jadwiga's aria from the opera The Haunted Manor (1865)

=== Antonín Dvořák ===
- Dumka in D minor (Elegy), Op. 35 (1876) for piano solo
- String Sextet in A, Op. 48 (1878), mvt. 2: "Dumka: Poco allegretto"
- String Quartet No. 10 in E-Flat Major, Op. 51 – B. 92 (1878–79): II. Dumka. Andante Con Moto
- Dumka in C minor, Op. 12a No. 1 (1884) for piano solo
- Slavonic Dances, Op. 46 (1878) and 72 (1887), (Three of the sixteen)
- Violin Concerto in A minor, Op. 53 (1879/80), mvt. 3 – though based on a Furiant, the middle part is a dumka
- Piano Quintet No. 2 in A, Op. 81 (1887), mvt. 2: "Dumka: Andante con moto"
- Piano Trio No. 4 in E minor, Op. 90 (1891) — the Dumky-Trio

=== Leoš Janáček ===
- Dumka for violin & piano

=== Bohuslav Martinů ===
- Dumka (unnumbered), H. 4 (1909 – Polička, Czechoslovakia), for solo piano
- Dumka No. 1, H. 249 (1936 – Paris, France), for solo piano
- Dumka No. 2, H. 250 (1936 – Paris, France), for solo piano
- Dumka No. 3, H. 285bis (1941 – Jamaica, NY, USA), for solo piano

=== Pyotr Tchaikovsky ===
- Dumka, Op. 59 (Scenes from a Russian village) for solo piano (1886)

=== Others ===
- Anatoly Kos-Anatolsky, Dumka and kolomyika from the opera Sojchyne krylo
- Mily Balakirev, Dumka in E flat minor (1900)
- Vasyl Barvinsky, Dumka (1925)
- Alexander Borodin, Dumka (from the piano quintet nr.2 in A Major, op. 81)
- Frédéric Chopin, Dumka, Op. 74 No. 19, KK IVb/9, CT. 147
- Rebecca Clarke, Dumka, Duo Concertante for Violin and Viola, with Piano (1941)
- Franz Liszt, Dumka, S 249B
- Mykola Lysenko, 2nd piano rhapsody (1877)
- Modest Mussorgsky, Paraska's aria from the opera Sorochynsky fair
- Sergei Prokofiev, Dumka in A minor (published posthumously)
- Adam Wronski, Dumka i kolomyjka, Op. 93 (1900)
- M. Shneider-Trnavsky, Dumka and dance for symphony orchestra (1909)
- M. Zawadsky, 12 dumky and 42 shumky
- V. Zaremba
- Sigismund Zaremba
- Nikolai Budashkin, Dumka (Träumerei) in the Andante from the 'Concerto for Domra and Orchestra' Op.8 (1943).
- John Brothers Piano Company, Dumka (2019)
- Sofia Mavrogenidou, Dumka (several versions : for piano solo, for flute, cello and piano, for cello and piano and for accordion and flute)
