= Piano Quintet No. 2 (Dvořák) =

Musical composition by Antonín Dvořák

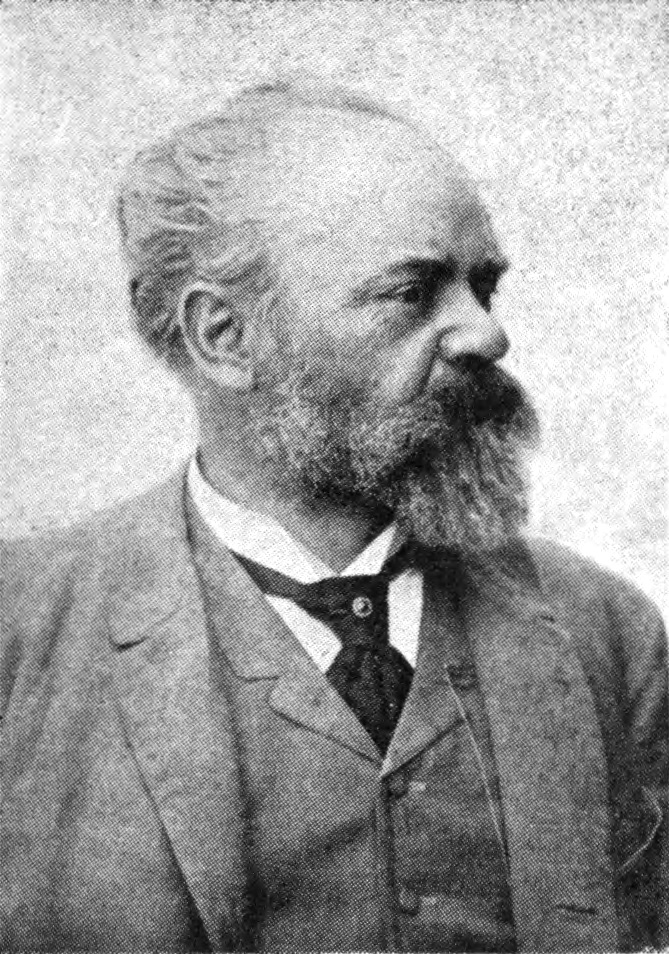
Antonín Dvořák in 1901

Antonín Dvořák's Piano Quintet No. 2 in A major Op. 81, B. 155, is a quintet for piano, 2 violins, viola, and cello. It was composed between August 18 and October 8, 1887, and was premiered in Prague on January 6, 1888, by Karel Ondříček, Jan Pelikán, Petr Mareš, Alois Neruda, and Karel Kovařovic. The quintet is acknowledged as one of the masterpieces in the form, along with those of Schumann, Brahms and Shostakovich.

The work was composed as the result of the composer's attempt to revise an earlier work, the first Piano Quintet in A major, Op. 5. Dvořák was dissatisfied with the Op. 5 quintet and destroyed the manuscript not long after its premiere. Fifteen years later, he reconsidered and retrieved a copy of the score from a friend and started making revisions. However, it has been conjectured that rather than submitting the revised work for publication, he decided that he would compose an entirely new work.

== Music ==
The new quintet is a mixture of Dvořák's personal form of expressive lyricism with elements from Czech folk music. Characteristically, those elements include styles and forms of song and dance, but not actual folk tunes; Dvořák created original melodies in the authentic folk style.

The music has four movements:

1. Allegro, ma non tanto
2. Dumka: Andante con moto
3. Scherzo (Furiant): Molto vivace
4. Finale: Allegro

It has a duration of approximately 40 minutes.

The first movement opens quietly with lyrical cello theme over piano accompaniment which is followed by a series of elaborate transformations. The viola introduces the second subject which is another lyrical melody, but much busier than the cello's stately line. Both themes are developed extensively by the first and second violins and the movement closes with a free recapitulation and an exuberant coda.

The second movement is labeled Dumka, which is a form that Dvořák famously used in his Dumky piano trio. It features a melancholy theme on the piano separated by fast, happy interludes. It follows a seven-part rondo pattern, ABACABA, where A, in F♯ minor, is the slow elegiac refrain on piano with variations, B is a bright D major section on violins, and C is a quick and vigorous section derived from the opening refrain. Each time the Dumka (A) section returns its texture is enriched.

The third movement is marked as a Furiant which is a fast Bohemian folk dance. The cello and viola alternate a rhythmic pizzicato underneath the main tune of the first violin. The slower trio section of the scherzo is also derived from the furiant theme, with the piano and violin alternating between the main melodies. The fast Bohemian folk dance returns and the movement finishes aggressively, setting up for the polka in the last movement.

The Finale is light-hearted and spirited. The second violin leads the theme into a fugue in the development section. In the coda, Dvořák writes tranquillo for a chorale-like section, which features the theme of the movement this time in augmentation and played pianissimo, before the pace quickens with an accelerando, and the quintet rushes to the finish.
