= Symphony No. 6 (Dvořák) =

1880 symphony by Antonín Dvořák

- by Antonín Dvořák
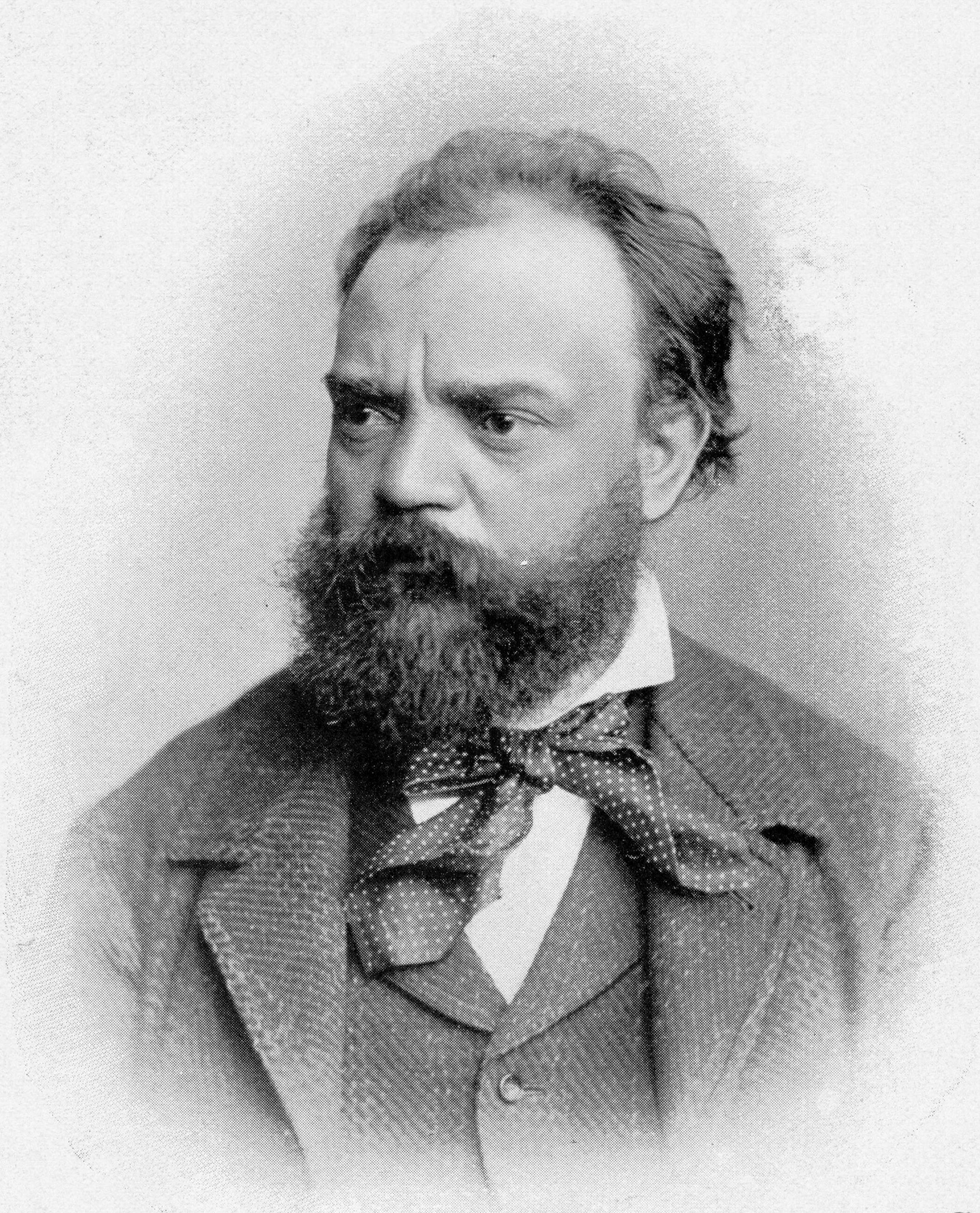
- Dvořák in 1879
- Key: D major
- Catalogue: B. 112
- Opus: 60
- Composed: 1880
- Dedication: Hans Richter
- Duration: c. 40 min.
- Movements: 4
- Scoring: Orchestra

Premiere
- Date: 25 March 1881
- Location: Prague
- Conductor: Adolf Čech
- Performers: Czech Philharmonic Orchestra

Antonín Dvořák composed his Symphony No. 6 in D major, Op. 60, B. 112, in 1880. It was premiered on 25 March 1881. It was originally published as Symphony No. 1 and is dedicated to Hans Richter, who was the conductor of the Vienna Philharmonic Orchestra. With a performance time of approximately 40 minutes, the four-movement piece was one of the first of Dvořák’s large symphonic works to draw international attention. In it, he manages to capture some of the Czech national style within a standard Germanic classical-romantic form.

== Background ==
This symphony was composed for the Vienna Philharmonic. In order to understand the context in which he composed it, the climate and reception of Dvořák’s earlier works in Vienna should be taken into consideration.

In late 1879, Hans Richter conducted the Vienna Philharmonic in a subscription concert that included the Third Slavonic Rhapsody. According to Dvořák, in a letter dated 23 November 1879,

I set out last Friday and was present at the performance of my Third Rhapsody, which was liked very much, and I had to show myself to the audience. I sat next to Brahms by the organ in the orchestra, and Richter drew me out. I had to appear. I must tell you that I immediately won the sympathy of the whole orchestra and that out of all the new works they tried over, and Richter said there were sixty of them, they liked my Rhapsody best of all. Richter kissed me on the spot and told me he was very glad to know me.…

Music historians have made various conclusions regarding what this letter implies about Dvořák’s reception in Vienna. Dvořák scholar John Clapham interprets this letter to say that the audience at the concert responded with a warm ovation, and that Richter was pleased with the work. Yet, according to David Brodbeck, this account probably only describes the dress rehearsal (the Philharmonic’s dress rehearsals were open to a limited audience), arguing that there is no other way to explain the presence of Brahms and Dvořák on stage during a performance. Eduard Hanslick, a music critic in Vienna at this time, reported: “The Rhapsody was respectfully but not warmly received. I had expected it to make a livelier effect after the impression of the dress rehearsal.” Even though audience reception at the actual concert may have been less than enthusiastic, Richter saw promise in Dvořák’s work and asked him to write a symphony for the orchestra. He finished the symphony the following year, in October 1880, and traveled to Vienna to play the composition on the piano for Richter, who was very excited about the work.

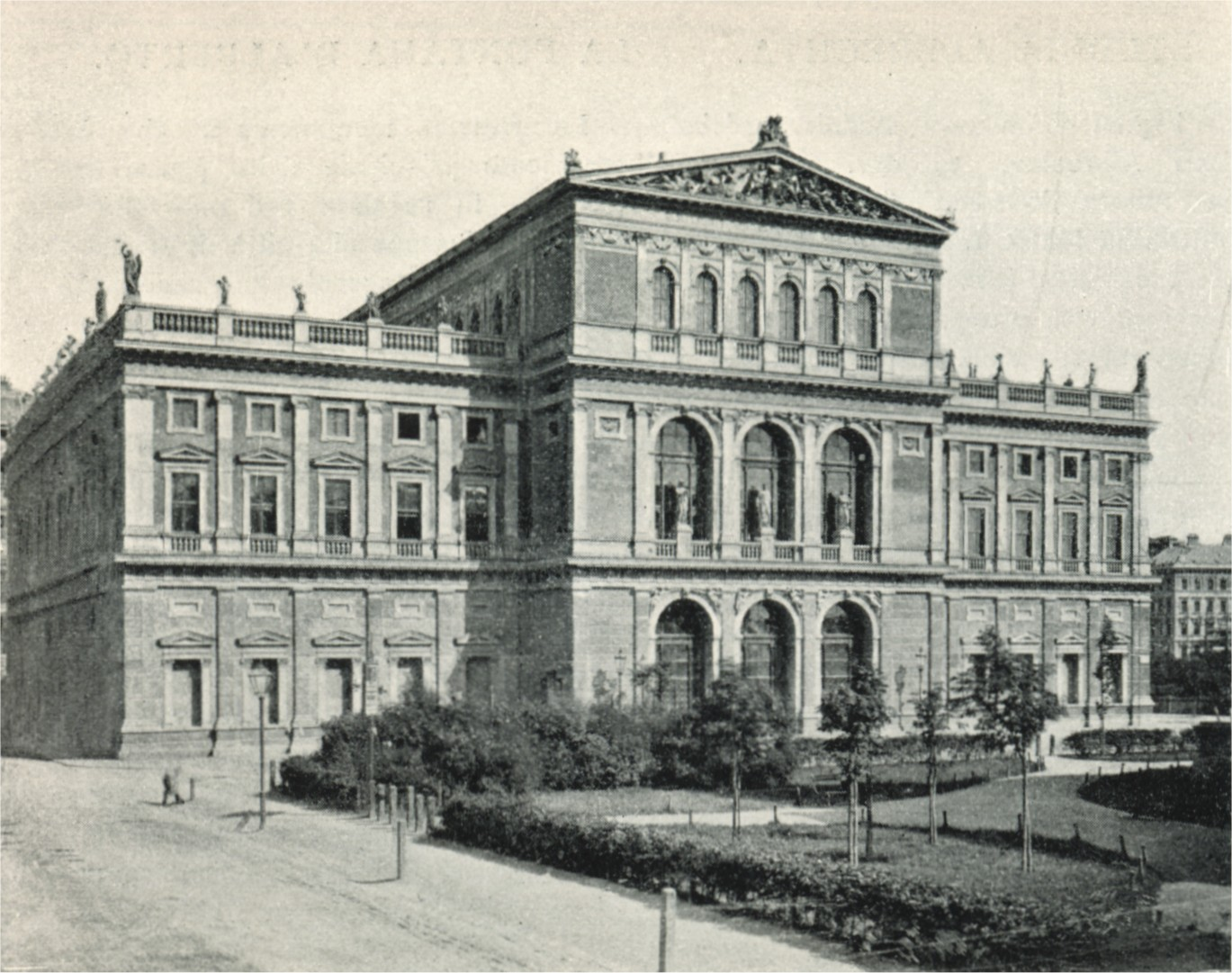
Musikverein, the Vienna Philharmonic Orchestra's concert hall in 1898

Dvořák expected to have the Vienna Philharmonic premiere his symphony in December 1880. However, Richter postponed the performance repeatedly, citing family sickness and an over-worked orchestra. Dvořák, suspicious of anti-Czech feelings in Vienna, eventually grew frustrated. He learned later that members of the orchestra objected to performing works by the relatively new Czech composer in two consecutive seasons.

Instead, Adolf Čech conducted the premiere of Symphony No. 6 with the Czech Philharmonic Orchestra on 25 March 1881 in Prague. The Scherzo was encored. Richter did eventually conduct the piece in London in 1882. Though he never conducted it in Vienna, he still retained an interest in Dvořák's compositions. The Vienna Philharmonic did not perform this symphony until 1942.

Dvořák’s Symphony No. 6 was originally issued as his Symphony No. 1 by Simrock, Dvořák’s German music publisher, as it was his first published work in this genre. Further confusion in numbering Dvořák’s symphonies came from several sources. Dvořák believed that his first symphony was lost, and numbered the remaining symphonies Nos. 1 to 8 by date of composition. Simrock continued to order the symphonies by publication date, ignoring the first four symphonies. Therefore, according to Dvořák, this work was his fifth symphony, according to the publisher it was his first, but chronologically (and after the first symphony was recovered) it is now known as his Symphony No. 6. The order of symphonies was first codified by Dvořák scholar Otakar Šourek.

== Compositional context and influences ==
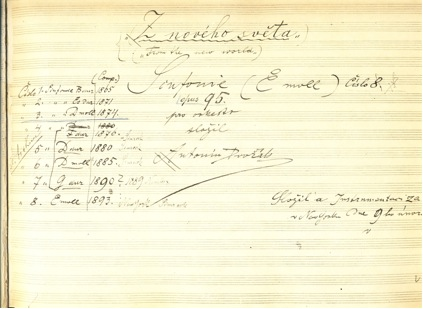
Facsimile of the title page of Dvořák’s Symphony No. 9 (which he lists as No. 8.) On the left is Dvořák’s own list of his symphonies, with Symphony No. 6, composed in 1880, listed as No. 5 (D dur).

The period of Dvořák's life that culminated with his Symphony No. 6 in D major was a time of experimentation and development of his personal compositional style. He developed his basic compositional voice largely from a study of the Germanic classical tradition. There are differing opinions about what influences were in play as he wrote his sixth symphony; it is possible to see the No. 6 as a synthesis of many influences, or as the focus of just a few.

Gerald Abraham writes, "...he had recognizable affinities with all three of the principal musical tendencies of the period, with the conservatism of Brahms and his followers, with the modernism of the Liszt-Wagner school, and with the nationalism that was in almost every country... in Europe." To be sure, he had personal contact with musical giants from each of these traditions. In 1863, Richard Wagner came to Prague and conducted a program of his own works, in which Dvořák played as a violist. He was very impressed with Wagner's compositional style. Dvořák then applied for a stipend from Svatobor, a Prague association for the support of artists, to finance a period of study with Liszt in Weimar. He was not selected for the prize. This turn of events probably greatly affected Dvořák's eventual shift to a personal integrative style of composition, as opposed to a complete devotion to the Wagner school. In 1874, Dvořák submitted numerous works to apply for the Austrian State Stipendium, money offered to young poor artists by the Ministry of Education. On the panel of judges that awarded Dvořák the prize was Johannes Brahms, who became a longtime friend and supporter of the young Czech. And in Prague itself was the older and more revered Czech nationalistic composer Bedřich Smetana who eventually supported Dvořák by being among the first to program and conduct concerts that included his compositions. David Beveridge states, "In 1880, with the composition of his Sixth Symphony, Dvořák had at last achieved an optimum balance between his nationalistic-romantic proclivities and the demands of classical form."

Yet, it may not be quite so simple to categorically say that a mix or balance of these influences culminated in Symphony No. 6. According to David Brodbeck, Dvořák purposely utilized sources from the German tradition in order to cater to a Viennese audience and their cultural values. At that time, Viennese culture elevated German qualities, and not Czech. In keeping with this attitude, Dvořák referenced works by Brahms and Beethoven, as well as a Viennese dance. The orchestral makeup, the key, the mood and the tempo marking of the Finale are all identical to the finale of Brahms's Second Symphony.

== Instrumentation and score ==
External audio
- Performed by the Berlin Philharmonic under Rafael Kubelík
- I. Allegro non tanto
- II. Adagio
- III. Scherzo (Furiant: Presto)
- IV. Finale (Allegro con spirito)

The symphony is written in four movements:

1. Allegro non tanto (D major), 560 measures
2. Adagio (B♭ major), 206 measures
3. Scherzo (Furiant), Presto (D minor), 439 measures
4. Finale, Allegro con spirito (D major), 564 measures

The score calls for two flutes (2nd doubling piccolo), two oboes, two clarinets, two bassoons, four horns, two trumpets, three trombones, one tuba, timpani, and strings.

The piccolo is only used in the third movement. The trombones and tuba are only used in the first and fourth movements.

== Orchestration and style ==
Dvořák's melodies are often presented in the woodwinds and horns, as well as the strings. Dvořák frequently converses back and forth between groups of instruments, sometimes finishing one another's phrases. The brass are used more as support in tutti passages, only occasionally leading the melody.

=== I. Allegro non tanto ===
The first movement is written in a traditional sonata form. It is in 3/4 time and in the key of D major. Dvořák has included extra melodic material with two primary themes, two transitional phrases, and two secondary themes. The initial primary theme has three parts that Dvořák uses in many ways throughout the piece. The first (x) is an ascending fourth, followed by a repeated D with a dotted rhythm (y), and finally descending stepwise motion from the fifth scale degree to the second (z).

First primary theme: Mvt. I, measures 2–10, flute and cello.

The transition begins in measure 78 with an upward stepwise motive that could be seen as filling in the interval of a fourth, which opened the initial primary theme (x), or as an inversion of the downward stepwise motive that closes the same primary theme (z). Either way, a connection can be drawn back to the initial primary theme.

The secondary area begins in measure 108. The initial secondary theme is in B minor and includes rhythmic similarities to the initial primary theme (y and z). In measure 120 the second secondary theme enters in B major. It is a lyrical theme presented in the oboe. This section begins pianissimo and gradually crescendos into the closing section in measure 161, which is also in B major.

Second secondary theme: Mvt. I, measures 120–123, oboe.

The score includes a repeat of the exposition; however, this is not usually observed because Dvořák later decided to eliminate it. "He finally wrote in the score now owned by the Czech Philharmonic Orchestra: 'once and for all without repetition.'"

The development begins with the thematic elements of the first primary theme, using each of these fragments in turn, as well as material from the second transitional phrase. It begins very softly and gradually gathers excitement with an increase in orchestration, fugato sections, and circle-of-fifths progressions. Shortly before the recapitulation, the strings break into a homophonic fortissimo statement of rising quarter notes for eleven measures, marked pesante (measures 310–320), before the full orchestra joins in for the retransition into the recapitulation in D major.

The movement ends with a D major coda (measure 480) that reviews the previous themes over pedals emphasizing the dominant and tonic pitches. The same string pesante section that preceded the recapitulation returns in measure 512. The piece then builds to a fortissimo with a canon of the first primary theme in the trumpets and trombones that is taken up by the whole orchestra. The excitement decays to pianissimo for what appears to be a peaceful conclusion, until a unison fortissimo statement of the second secondary theme closes the movement.

=== II. Adagio ===
The Adagio, in B♭ major, is a loose rondo containing variations within the sections. The form can be described as A B A C A B A. The Adagio is lightly scored with frequent woodwind solos. Otakar Šourek, an early 20th-century Dvořák scholar, wrote, "the second movement has the quality of a softly yearning nocturne and of an ardently passionate intermezzo." The main theme, or A section, is built on the interval of an upward fourth, just as the first movement begins (x). Much of the movement is focused on this theme, which returns many times and is varied throughout. Each A section is in B♭ major.

Primary theme: Mvt. II, measures 5–12, violin I.

The B sections feature a short falling motive and also incorporate material from the introduction of the movement, measures 1–4. The first B section (measures 35–72) moves to D major and is preceded by a modulatory transition. The B section returns in measure 156.

The C section, measures 104–139, could be considered developmental. It begins in B♭ minor but moves away fairly quickly and is tonally unstable. It uses melodic material from the introduction as well as the main theme. In measures 115–122, the first four notes of the main theme are presented at half the speed, first at the original pitches, and then a major third higher. This material is then returned to the original rhythmic values and passed back and forth between the horn and oboe.

The Adagio closes with a simplified version of the opening of the main theme, which reveals the close relationship between the introductory material and the main theme. The movement ends with pianissimo woodwinds and overlapping motives, similar to the opening of the movement.

=== III. Scherzo (Furiant): Presto ===
The third movement incorporates a Czech dance, the Furiant. This is a quick dance in triple meter with hemiolas at the beginning of the phrase. The effect is that the movement appears to alternate between 2/4 and 3/4. The use of a Furiant is a nationalistic feature.

Primary theme: Mvt. III, measures 5–12, violin I.

The form of the third movement is a ternary scherzo and trio. It is in D minor, moving to D major in the trio (measures 154–288). The opening scherzo has two sections which are both repeated. The melody is characterized by frequent hemiolas and a half-step interval in the first section. The second section is more lyrical and is in F major. The trio is much more relaxed and retains the triple meter feel throughout, with less hemiola interruption. The piccolo is featured in this section, with a lyrical solo over pizzicato strings. The trio winds down with a long D major harmony and the scherzo is ushered in with string section hemiolas. The closing scherzo is almost identical to the opening scherzo, but without repeats.

=== IV. Finale: Allegro con spirito ===
The Finale is in sonata form and follows the conventions of structure and harmonic motion. The exposition begins in D major with a primary theme that resembles the first primary theme of the first movement, including an upward interval of a fourth (x), a dotted rhythm on a repeated D (y), and stepwise motion.

Primary theme: Mvt. IV, measures 1–6, Violin I.

The secondary theme appears in measure 70 in the dominant, A major, and comprises a descending triplet figure. The development section (measures 139–318) reverses the order of themes, first exploring the secondary theme and then the primary theme, frequently with imitation. The recapitulation is fairly straightforward. The piece concludes with a fiery coda beginning with a fugue section on the main theme and a counterpoint theme in quavers, with several homophonic passages that feature the brass and present the primary theme at half the speed. The symphony closes solidly with a tutti fortissimo statement.

== Influences ==
Dvořák's Symphony No. 6 has many similarities to symphonies by Brahms and Beethoven, as well as references to Czech folk tunes. These links have been proposed and debated by scholars and music critics.

The most common connection claimed is with Johannes Brahms' Symphony No. 2, which was written in 1877, three years before Dvořák’s Symphony No. 6. A. Peter Brown writes, "Brahms's Symphony no. 2, in the same key, was more than an inspiration to Dvořák; it became a model for the younger composer: the first and final movements of both works have the same scoring, tempo, meter, and key..." He points out similarities in the primary themes of the first and fourth movements, as well as structural and orchestration similarities. David Beveridge also compares the first and fourth movements of Dvořák's Symphony no. 6 with Brahms' Symphony no. 2, noting that both composers relate their fourth movement primary theme back to the primary theme of the first movement, a cyclical feature.

Writing for Dvořák's 100th anniversary, Julius Harrison agrees with these comparisons to Brahms' Symphony No. 2, while also pointing out differences in the two composers:

Brahms takes a D major triad as a kind of thesis in triplicate, from which, by means of the melodies resulting from that triad, he proceeds step by step to a logical conclusion. Dvořák takes an odd bit of sound, a mere dominant-tonic progression ... and then, to our great delight fashions it into a movement, structurally classical, yet thematically having the nature of lovely improvisation.

Robert Layton argues that Dvořák's early sketches for the first movement were in D minor and 2/4 meter, differing from Brahms' Symphony No. 2. He cites a Czech folk song, Já mám koně, as the inspiration for the primary theme of the first movement, with Dvořák later altering the mode and time signature. "It is of course the test of his genius that he should have transformed this idea into the glowing and radiant theme that the definitive score can boast."

Czech folk song: Já mám koně.

Dvořák’s Early sketch for the first primary theme of Mvt. I.

There is another possible source for this same primary theme. David Brodbeck writes, "Dvořák's main theme alludes directly to the so-called Großvater-Tanz, which traditionally served as the closing dance at Viennese balls." If this is the case, it would lend support to the idea that Dvořák wrote the symphony specifically for a Vienna audience and lessen the case for Dvořák's nationalistic influences.

Opening of the Großvater-Tanz.

Nors Josephson proposes similarities in form, key structure, and orchestration of the first movement of Dvořák's Symphony No. 6 with Beethoven's Symphony No. 3. He compares many of Dvořák's themes with passages by Beethoven, as well as similar compositional techniques. "Aside from the Czech folk-song, Já mám koně, nearly all the principal motifs of Dvořák's sixth Symphony can be traced back to ... compositions by Beethoven and Brahms." Many of Josephson's comparisons involve transitional material, modulatory processes, and orchestration, emphasizing that Dvořák was influenced by Beethoven's procedures, not just his melodies. "Dvořák frequently employed Beethovenian techniques as creative stimuli."

The second movement of Dvořák's Symphony No. 6 has often been compared to the third movement of Beethoven's Symphony No. 9 for its melodic shape, use of woodwinds, and the key structure (B♭ major to D major).

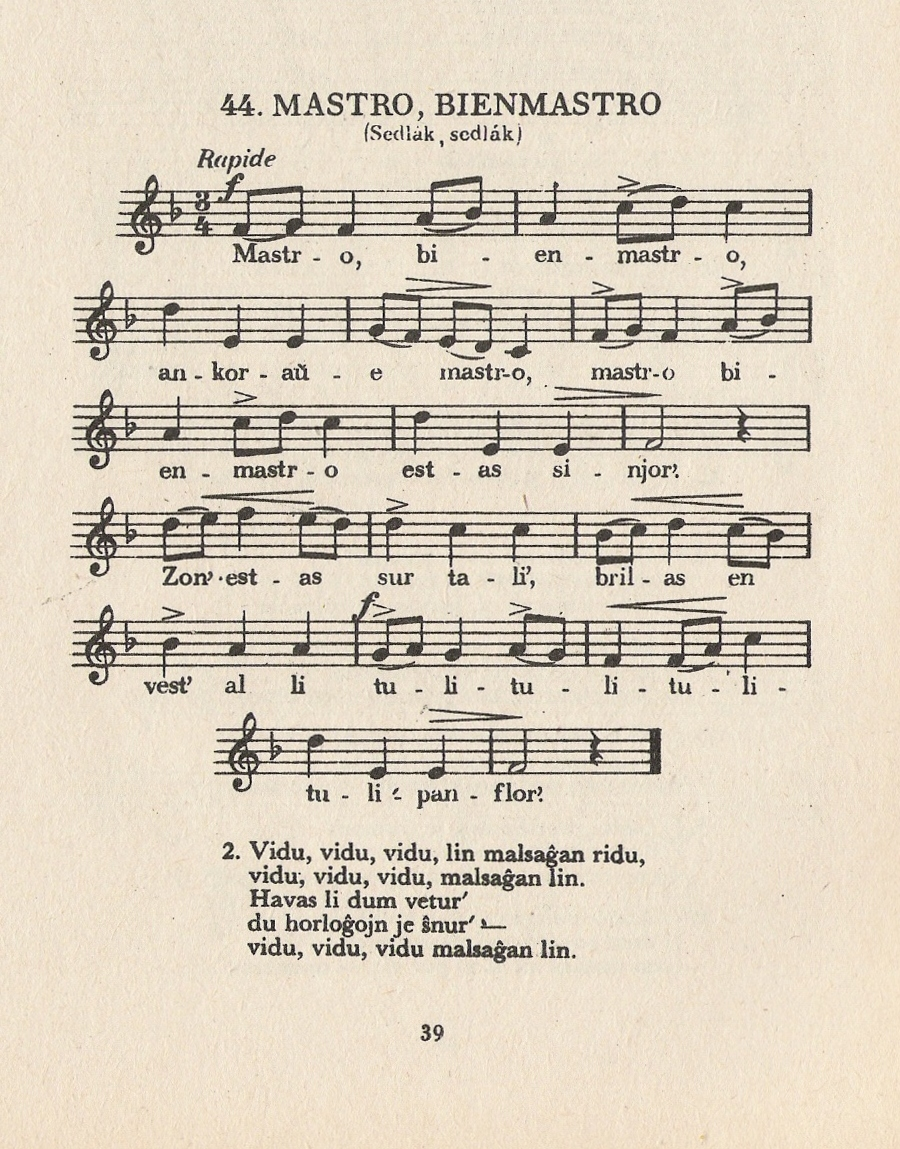
Sedlák, sedlák in a songbook of Czech folksongs translated into Esperanto.

Another Czech folksong, Sedlák, sedlák, may have been used by Dvořák in the third movement of his Symphony No. 6 to create the Furiant melody. John Clapham states that, "the classic model for all true furiants is the folksong 'Sedlák, sedlák', well known to all Czechs." Dvořák's theme is not a literal translation of the folk song, but it does have similarities, including hemiola in the first half of the phrase and neighbor tone relationships.

Beginning of the Czech folksong: Sedlák, sedlák.

These examples show that there were many inspirations for Dvořák's Symphony No. 6. The myriad of possible references and models by Brahms, Beethoven, and Czech folksongs demonstrate Dvořák's synthesis of his nationalistic style with the Viennese symphonic tradition.

== Critical and cultural reception ==
=== In Vienna ===
In Vienna in 1879 (a year before the intended premiere of the symphony), a political shift was happening. The newly elected Austrian parliament allowed regions to conduct education and official government business in the predominant language of each region, thus posing a seeming threat to the German language and German cultural dominance in general.

While a few years earlier Dvořák might have been judged an acculturated German, in 1879 he was increasingly considered a Czech and thus a threat to the established dominant German culture in Vienna. His previous works, such as the Moravian Duets, Slavonic Dances and Slavonic Rhapsody, were popular in many other countries in Europe at least in part for their "exoticism". But the climate in Vienna was becoming quite unwelcoming of any compositions that issued from non-Germanic roots, especially those works with obvious references to other nationalities (such as the Furiant in Symphony no. 6.) "...in Vienna the musical exoticism that had played so well elsewhere ran head-on into the political crisis engendered by the Liberals' recent loss of power." It is likely that this was the main reason that the established, elite Vienna Philharmonic did not premiere Dvořák's Symphony No. 6. It was first performed in Vienna in 1883 by the Gesellschaft der Musikfreunde, with Wilhelm Gericke conducting.

=== In Europe ===
The piece was well liked by audiences and critics in much of Europe. “Not long after Simrock published the D major Symphony, performances were taking place in half a dozen different countries, and generally the new work was so well received as to contribute greatly towards establishing Dvořák as one of the foremost composers of his generation.”

English music critic Ebenezer Prout described the symphony in his 1882 review as “(a) work that, notwithstanding some imperfections, must be considered one of the most important of its kind produced for some time. Its performance was characterized by immense spirit, and the audience was unreserved in its token of appreciation.” Dvořák’s Symphony no. 6 was especially popular in England. Dvořák traveled to London in 1884 to conduct a program including his Symphony No. 6 with the Royal Philharmonic Society. His trip was a success and the Royal Philharmonic Society made Dvořák an honorary member a few months later, also commissioning another symphony from him. Joseph Bennett, writing a review of Dvořák’s works for a London musical publication in 1884, had this to say of him: “Dvořák’s success in England affords matter for much congratulation. We have from him that which is new and not mischievous…that which is founded…upon the natural expression of a people’s musical nature. The more of Dvořák the better, therefore, and the indications are that a good deal of him awaits us."

=== At home ===
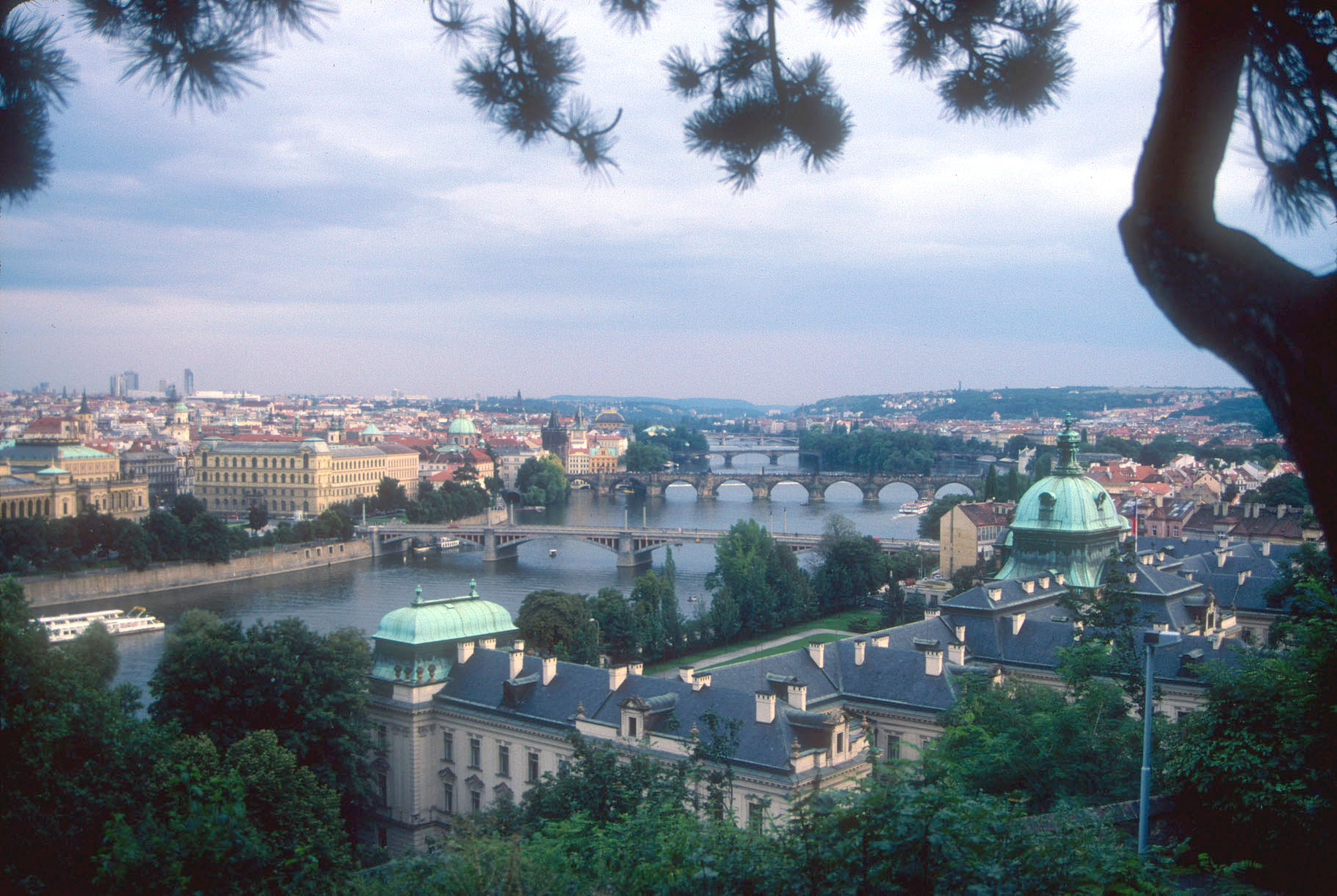
View of Prague

The success Dvořák experienced abroad was recognized in his homeland. In 1878 he led a concert consisting entirely of his own works in Prague, which was very well received. While Dvořák was occasionally criticized for not being nationalistic enough by his own countrymen, in April, 1881, a critic for Dalibor, a Czech paper, wrote: “This new Dvořák symphony simply excels over all others of the same type within contemporary musical literature….In truth, the work (Symphony no. 6) has an imminently Czech nature, just as Dvořák continues along the basis of his great and fluent power, the tree of which is decorated by the ever more beautiful fruits of his creation.”

== Performance history ==
Premiere
March 25, 1881. Prague: Czech Philharmonic Orchestra, Adolf Čech, conductor.

First performance with Hans Richter
May 15, 1882. London: Hans Richter conductor.

North American premiere
January 6, 1883. New York: Philharmonic Society, Theodore Thomas conductor.

First performance in Vienna
February 18, 1883. Gesellschaft der Musik freunde, Wilhelm Gericke conductor.

First performance by the Vienna Philharmonic Orchestra
1942. Vienna: Vienna Philharmonic Orchestra

== Selected discography ==
Year	Orchestra	Conductor	Label
2014	Luzerner Sinfonieorchester	James Gaffigan	harmonia mundi
2004	London Symphony Orchestra	Sir Colin Davis	LSO Live
2003	Slovak Philharmonic Orchestra	Zdeněk Košler	Opus, MHS
(Live) 2002	Czech Philharmonic Orchestra	Charles Mackerras	Supraphon
1999	Vienna Philharmonic Orchestra	Myung-whun Chung	Deutsche Grammophon
1992	Czech Philharmonic Orchestra	Jiří Bělohlávek	Chandos
1991	Cleveland Orchestra	Christoph von Dohnányi	Decca
1990	Slovak Philharmonic Orchestra	Stephen Gunzenhauser	Naxos
1988	Milwaukee Symphony Orchestra	Zdeněk Mácal	Koss Classics
1987	Czech Philharmonic Orchestra	Libor Pešek	Virgin Classics
1986	Scottish National Orchestra	Neeme Järvi	Chandos
(Live) 1984	Stockholm Philharmonic Orchestra	Yuri Ahronovich	BIS
1982	Czech Philharmonic Orchestra	Václav Neumann	Supraphon
1981	Philharmonia Orchestra	Sir Andrew Davis	CBS
1980	London Philharmonic Orchestra	Mstislav Rostropovich	Angel
c. 1980	Prague Symphony Orchestra	Václav Smetáček	Panton
1976	Royal Philharmonic Orchestra	Charles Groves	His Master's Voice
1972	Berlin Philharmonic Orchestra	Rafael Kubelik	DG
1968	Boston Symphony Orchestra	Erich Leinsdorf	RCA
1967	London Symphony Orchestra	Witold Rowicki	Philips
1966	Czech Philharmonic Orchestra	Karel Ančerl	Supraphon, Artia
1965	London Symphony Orchestra	István Kertész	London
1960	Czech Philharmonic Orchestra	Karel Šejna	Supraphon, Artia
1946	Cleveland Orchestra	Erich Leinsdorf	Columbia
1938	Czech Philharmonic Orchestra	Václav Talich	Supraphon, Koch

On the Saturday 21 December 2013 broadcast of BBC Radio 3's CD review Building a Library, music critic Jan Smaczny surveyed recordings of Dvořák's Symphony No. 6 and recommended the recording by the London Symphony Orchestra, Istvan Kertesz (conductor), as the best available choice.
