= Nikolaus Simrock =

German horn player and music publisher

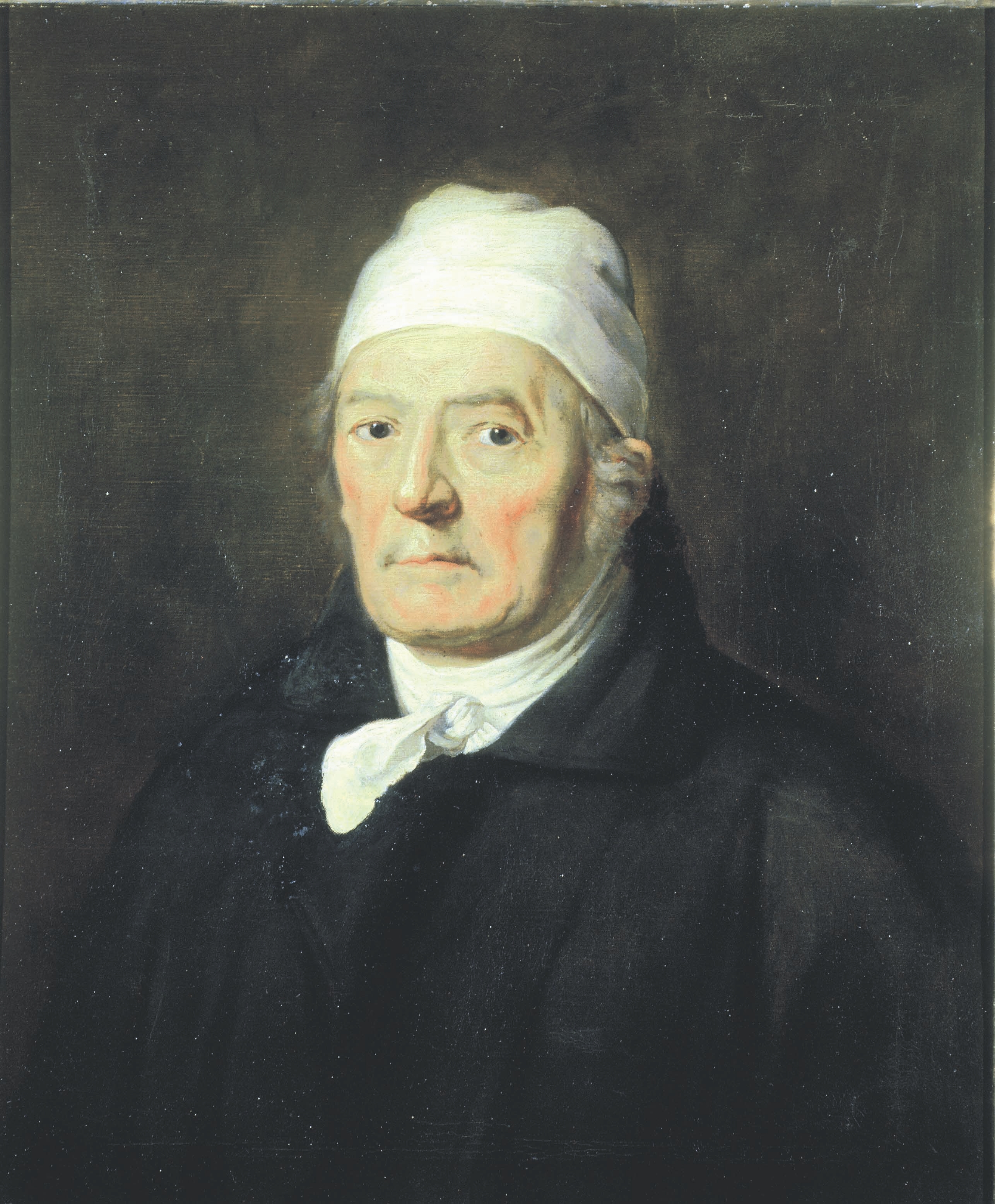
Nikolaus Simrock, painted by Joseph Karl Stieler, c. 1820

Nikolaus Simrock (23 August 1751 in Mainz – 12 June 1832 in Bonn) was a German horn player at the court of the Elector of Cologne in Bonn and a music publisher. He was a friend of Ludwig van Beethoven and founder of the N. Simrock music publishing house. "Highly esteemed as a man and a musician", he remained in contact with Beethoven throughout the 1790s and is regarded as a "reliable witness" to Beethoven's years in Bonn.

== Biography ==
Simrock was born in Mainz, the son of a corporal, and was a horn player in a French military chapel before age 16. He applied at the Cologne Elector Maximilian Frederick for a job in the Bonn court orchestra. He began working there in April 1775 as "bugler" with an annual salary of 300 florins. The young Beethoven later played in the same orchestra.

Simrock was one of the most famous philosophers of the Enlightenment in the elector's residence. Like his colleagues Franz Anton Ries and Christian Gottlob Neefe, he belonged to the Minervalkirche Stagira, an association of the Order of Illuminati. After its demise he was a founding member of the "Lesegesellschaft" (Reading Society) in Bonn. He was a member of the Masonic Lodge "Les Frères courageux", founded in Bonn in 1805.

In 1793, Nikolaus Simrock founded the music publishing house N. Simrock in Bonn. Two of his early publications were Beethoven's variations "Das rote Käppchen" (WoO 66) in 1793 and variations on a theme by Waldstein (WoO 67) in 1794. One reason for the success of this company – in addition to Simrock's business acumen – was his pro-French attitude that paid off after the electoral period in 1794 during the early occupation of Bonn and the Rhineland by French revolutionary troops.

Simrock had become one of the most important European music publishers by the beginning of the 19th century. Under his leadership, N. Simrock published first editions of music by Joseph Haydn, whom he met in person, and Ludwig van Beethoven (13 first editions).

Among the notable composers published after Simrock's death were Robert Schumann, including his Third Symphony and Felix Mendelssohn, including his oratorios Elias and Paulus. Fritz Simrock, his grandson, moved the headquarters of the publishing house from Bonn to Berlin in 1870. He is especially known for publishing works of Johannes Brahms and Antonín Dvořák.

== Personal life ==
Simrock was married to Franziska Ottilie Blaschek from Mainz and they had 13 children together. The family members influenced nearly 200 years of cultural history of the Rhineland. One of his sons, Peter Joseph Simrock, ran the publishing business, another son was for many years the manager of the Hotel "Trierer Hof" in the market square, where Alexandre Dumas was a guest. The youngest son, Karl, was an editor of old and middle German literature and German literature of the 19th century.
