= Symphony No. 3 (Schumann) =

1851 musical work by Robert Schumann

- Rhenish
- by Robert Schumann
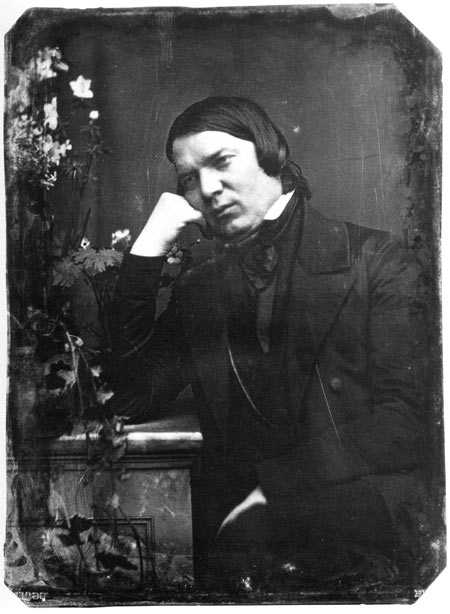
- Schumann in an 1850 daguerreotype
- Key: E♭ major
- Opus: 97
- Composed: 2 November - 9 December 1850
- Published: 1851, Bonn
- Publisher: N. Simrock
- Duration: c. 35 minutes
- Movements: 5
- Scoring: Orchestra

Premiere
- Date: 6 February 1851
- Location: Düsseldorf
- Conductor: Robert Schumann

The Symphony No. 3 in E♭ major, Op. 97, also known as the Rhenish, is the last symphony composed by Robert Schumann, although not the last published. It was composed from 2 November to 9 December 1850 and premiered on 6 February 1851 in Düsseldorf, conducted by Schumann himself, and was received with mixed reviews, "ranging from praise without qualification to bewilderment". However, according to A. Peter Brown, members of the audience applauded between every movement, and especially at the end of the work when the orchestra joined them in congratulating Schumann by shouting "hurrah!".

== Biographical context ==
Throughout his life, Schumann explored a diversity of musical genres, including chamber, vocal, and symphonic music. Although Schumann wrote an incomplete G minor symphony as early as 1832–33 (of which the first movement was performed on two occasions to an unenthusiastic reception), he only began seriously composing for the symphonic genre after receiving his wife's encouragement in 1839.

Schumann gained quick success as a symphonic composer following his orchestral debut with his warmly received First Symphony, composed in 1841 and premiered in Leipzig with Felix Mendelssohn conducting. The work which was later to be published as his Fourth Symphony was also finished in 1841. In 1845 he composed his C major Symphony, which was published in 1846 as No. 2, and, in 1850, his Third Symphony. By the end of his career Schumann had composed a total of four symphonies.

The published numbering of the symphonies is not chronological because his Fourth Symphony of 1841 was not well received at its Leipzig premiere; Schumann withdrew the score and revised it ten years later in Düsseldorf. This final version was published in 1851 after the "Rhenish" Symphony was published.

== Music ==
External audio
- Performed by the Staatskapelle Dresden under Wolfgang Sawallisch
- I. Lebhaft
- II. Scherzo (Sehr mäßig)
- III. Nicht schnell
- IV. Feierlich
- V. Lebhaft

The symphony is scored for two flutes, two oboes, two clarinets in B♭, two bassoons, four French horns in E♭, two trumpets in E♭, three trombones, timpani and strings.

The symphony comprises five movements:

1. Lebhaft
2. Scherzo: Sehr mäßig (in C major)
3. Nicht schnell (in A♭ major)
4. Feierlich (in E♭ minor)
5. Lebhaft

In a typical performance, this symphony lasts approximately 35 minutes.

=== I. Lebhaft ===
The first movement, "Lebhaft" (lively), follows the 19th-century model of a large-scale sonata form. The symphony begins immediately with a heroic theme in E♭ major, scored for full orchestra. The strong hemiolic rhythm of the main theme returns throughout the movement giving an ever-present forward push. This forward push allows for the melodies of this movement to soar over the bar lines. The transition moves from the tonic to mediant, G minor, with the use of a newly introduced motive in the strings consisting of energetic ascending eighth notes juxtaposed with material from the main theme. The subordinate theme is scored for winds and its less rhythmic drive has a gentler quality. The exposition unfolds with the return of the scale motif from the transition and main theme, ending in the dominant, B♭.

Schumann does not repeat the exposition, but rather has the strings and bassoon drop from unison B♭ to an F♯, leading to a triple forte explosion in the unexpected key of G major marking the beginning of the development. The development section is composed mainly of the three main themes from the exposition. Schumann skillfully moves through a variety of keys for nearly 200 bars, never returning to E♭, until a dominant arrival preceding the climactic and triumphant return of the main theme in the home key.

In a typical performance, this movement lasts approximately 9 minutes.

=== II. Scherzo: Sehr mäßig ===
The second movement, "Sehr mäßig" (very moderate), is in C major and takes the place of a scherzo. The form of this movement is a synthesis of a traditional minuet and trio and theme and variations. The opening theme is based on the ländler, a German folk dance. This is played out first in the lower strings and bassoons, and then is repeated and varied.

The second theme with "trio" feeling is in A minor, played by the winds. Schumann uses a pedal point C throughout this section which is highly unusual, not because it is a pedal point, but rather because C is the third note instead of the root of A minor. After this middle section, the rustic theme returns scored for full orchestra and thins out until only the cellos and bassoons are playing the theme, ending with soft pizzicato.

In a typical performance, this movement lasts approximately 6 minutes.

=== III. Nicht schnell ===
The third movement, "Nicht schnell" (not fast), is in the subdominant A♭ major. The omission of timpani and brass in combination with the static harmony (the movement never strays far or for long from A♭), creates a moment of calm repose in the middle of the symphony. The thematic construction uses long beautiful themes that are constantly being pushed along by this friendly little motif of four chromatically ascending sixteenth notes, often on the fourth beat of a measure.

In a typical performance, this movement lasts approximately 5 minutes.

=== IV. Feierlich ===
The fourth movement (the "Cathedral" movement), "Feierlich" (solemn) is meant to suggest a "solemn ceremony" at which an archbishop was made cardinal in the Cologne Cathedral. It's written with 3 flats as the key signature, but most of the movement is actually in E♭ minor (6 flats).

The movement begins with a sforzando eighth-note E♭-minor chord in the strings that moves immediately into a pianissimo French horn and trombone chorale. This beautiful and hauntingly quiet low brass writing is a notoriously difficult spot in performances since the trombones have yet to play at all up until this point. This expansive theme is voiced by the winds and first violins in eighth notes, accelerating the tempo by more than double the previous tempo, as the opening statement reaches its conclusion. Following the opening statement's conclusion, the theme is used in imitation, mostly at intervals of a fourth and fifth, and combined with an accelerated version.

After this, the tempo changes into a triple meter where the first theme undergoes a series of contrapuntal treatments. While the meter returns to a duple meter, the brass and winds play interwoven contrapuntal lines of the most expansive form of the theme while the strings push forward with constant 16th notes. This comes to a close on an E♭-minor chord, and after one beat's rest an unexpected fanfare in B major which is then answered by the strings in pianissimo, restating it in E♭ minor. While this is repeated the rhythmic motion slows down, and fragments of the theme can be heard at the end.

In a typical performance, this movement lasts approximately 6 minutes.

=== V. Lebhaft ===
In the fifth movement, the piece returns to E♭ major in duple meter with the spirited feeling of a Finale. The first theme returns to the rustic dance feel from earlier in the symphony, scored for full orchestra. Sixteen bars later, a second, lighter but just as spirited theme appears. These themes are varied and imitated as the movement pushes exuberantly forward towards its heroic conclusion in E♭ major.

In a typical performance, this movement lasts approximately 6 minutes.

== Models ==
In general, Schumann used Beethoven's symphonies as the main model for his symphonic writing, but he also used Franz Schubert's Ninth Symphony and Felix Mendelssohn's symphonies and concerti as points of reference. In particular, he used Mendelssohn as an example of how "songlike forms can be integrated into developmental themes." In his survey on Schumann's symphonies, Brown suggests that the main models for his Third Symphony are Beethoven's Third and Sixth Symphonies, and Hector Berlioz's Symphonie fantastique.

Just as the second movement of Beethoven's Sixth Symphony depicts a flowing brook, the second movement of Schumann's Third Symphony is a musical depiction of the flowing river Rhine. In both pieces, this imagery is due to the flowing eighth notes in a wave contour. One of the clearest differences between Beethoven's and Schumann's approaches to using programmatic elements in their symphonies is that Beethoven actually left a title to his second movement: "Szene am Bach" (Scene at the brook). Schumann also originally left a title which translated to "Morning on the Rhine", but that was removed before publication.

Schumann's reason for removing the title was his belief that providing the extramusical program would force a certain opinion of the music upon the listener. This is supported by the following quote from Schumann: "If the eye is once directed to a certain point, the ear can no longer judge independently." Schumann also once said that "we must not show our heart to the world: a general impression of a work of art is better; at least, no preposterous comparisons can then be made."

== Mahler's reorchestration ==
The symphony was reorchestrated by Gustav Mahler, who thinned out and lightened the textures while allowing for the increased possibilities of the brass instrumentation of a late 19th/early 20th century orchestra.

== Recordings ==
Of the 1972 recording by Wolfgang Sawallisch with the Staatskapelle Dresden, one critic wrote that "with such splendid standards of music making, recording and presentation, this is a benchmark issue which fully justifies its self-generated accolade among the pantheon of 'Great Composers of the Century.'"

== Notes and references ==
- Brown, A. Peter (2007). The Symphonic Repertoire, Volume III Part A: The European Symphony from ca. 1800 to ca. 1930: Germany and the Nordic Countries. Bloomington, Indiana: Indiana University Press.
