= N. Simrock =

German music publisher

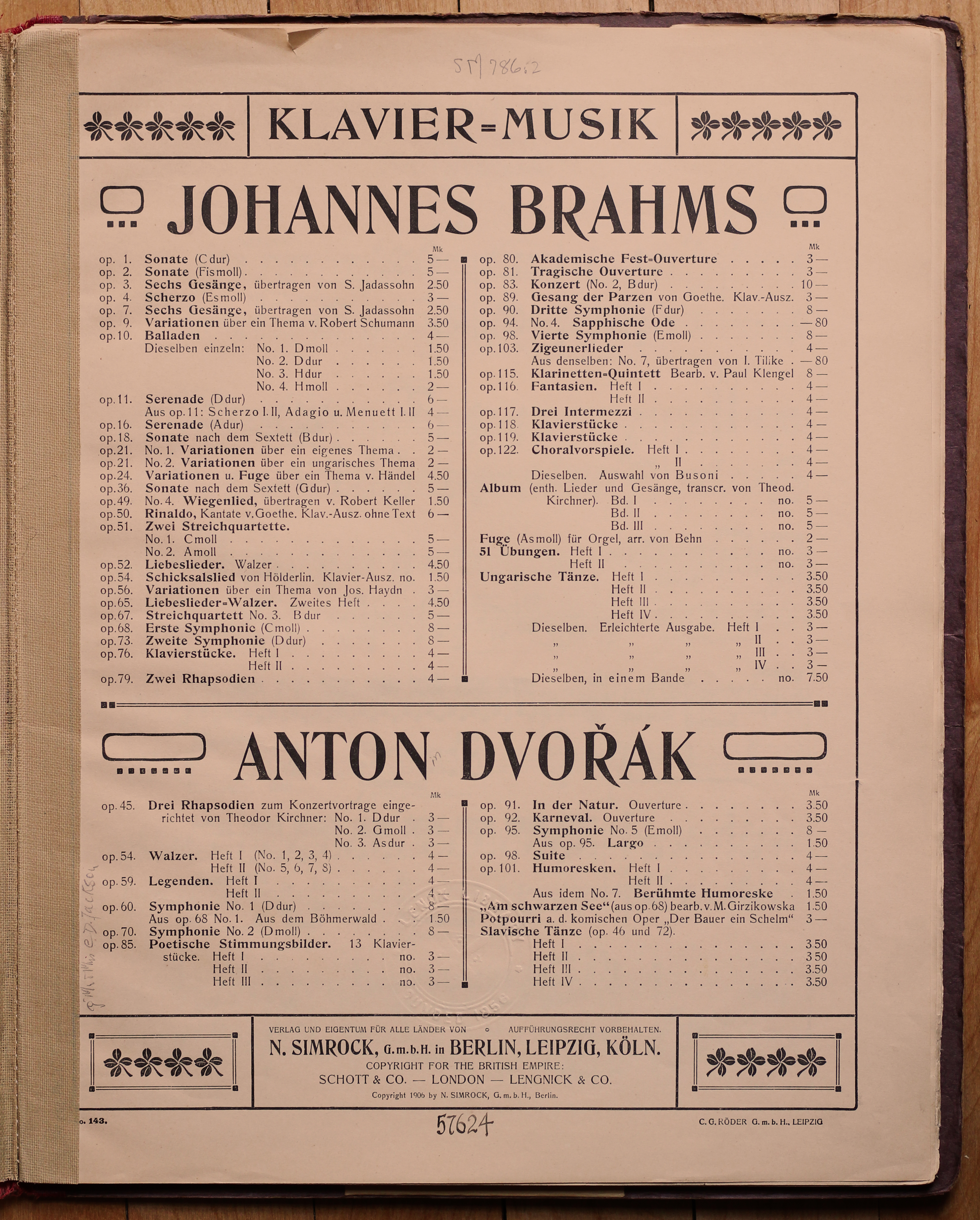
Title page of a 1906 Simrock edition of Dvorak's 5th Symphony for piano

N. Simrock (in German Musikverlag N. Simrock, Simrock Verlag, or simply Simrock) was a German music publisher founded by Nikolaus Simrock which published many 19th-century German classical music composers. It was acquired in 1929 by Anton Benjamin.

The firm was founded in 1793 by Nikolaus Simrock in Bonn. Simrock had been a close friend to Beethoven his whole life. It was expanded by his son Peter Joseph in the 19th century, and in 1870 moved to Berlin by the latter's son Fritz. His nephew Hans Simrock later ran the company, and in 1907 acquired another music publisher, Bartholf Senff of Leipzig. In 1911 the company merged with Albert Ahn's publishing house to form Ahn & Simrock, headquartered in Bonn and Berlin, but later separated from it. In 1929 it was sold to the Leipzig publisher Anton J. Benjamin, which was re-established in 1951 in Hamburg and acquired by Boosey & Hawkes in 2002. Many of the company's archives and plates were lost in the Second World War and had to be reconstructed by reproducing old editions. The remaining archives were mostly held in what is now the Saxon State Archive in Leipzig, but some material was dispersed in the 1990s and early 2000s.

The company was the first publisher of the music of a veritable "Who's Who" of classical music composers, including Wolfgang Amadeus Mozart (what must have been a hand-written copy of The Magic Flute), Joseph Haydn, Ludwig van Beethoven (13 first editions), Franz Schubert, Felix Mendelssohn Robert Schumann (including his Third Symphony), Johannes Brahms, Felix Mendelssohn (such as his oratorios Elias and Paulus), Max Bruch (including his Violin Concerto No. 1), Antonín Dvořák, and Josef Suk.
