= Fritz Simrock =

German classical music publisher (1837–1901)

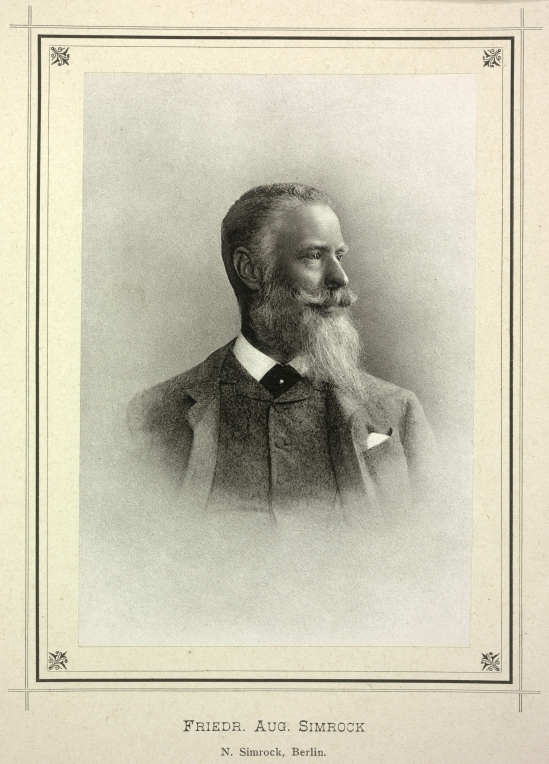

Friedrich August Simrock, better known as Fritz Simrock (January 2, 1837 in Bonn – August 20, 1901 in Ouchy) was a German music publisher who inherited a publishing firm from his grandfather Nikolaus Simrock. Simrock is most noted for publishing most of the music of Johannes Brahms and Antonín Dvořák.

Simrock published almost all of Brahms's pieces from Opus 16 to Opus 120 and was very good friends with Brahms, even going on holidays to Italy with him. Simrock generally paid Brahms well for his music, but with Dvořák he was often unwilling to publish orchestral pieces, for example, his Eighth Symphony. Simrock was so involved in the lives of prominent musicians that Joseph Joachim came to believe that his wife Amalie was cheating on him with Simrock, and Brahms wrote a famous "lengthy letter" in support of Amalie's innocence, which "was cited in evidence at the [Joachims'] divorce proceedings." The divorce was not granted.

Per Brahms's advice, Simrock took a chance with the young Antonín Dvořák. After publishing only a few of Dvořák's works, his risk paid off—Dvořák quickly became one of the most popular composers in Europe. Simrock thus came to be the primary publisher of Dvořák's music for much of the composer's career, but their relationship was at times strained for a number of reasons. Among these were Simrock's stubborn insistence that Dvořák produce more light-hearted, miniature works (such as his wildly popular and extremely commercially successful Slavonic Dances, Op. 46) when the composer expressed desires to compose more large-scale orchestral works, which Simrock claimed didn't sell. Also, Simrock often confounded Dvořák with his blatantly anti-Czech sentiments, which were popular with ethnic Germans in the Habsburg Empire at the time. Dvořák, for his part, maintained his musical and moral integrity, responding calmly to Simrock's nationalistically tinged letters and admonishing him for trying to force his musical process, stating in a letter to the publisher regarding a second set of Slavonic Dances: "as long as I am not in the mood for it, I can do nothing." However, as Dvořák's popularity grew, he began to receive commissions for large-scale works from other publishers, notably Novello & Co. in England, which looked increasingly tempting to the composer despite his long-term oral contract with Simrock specifying that Simrock would be his sole publisher. Despite this contract, Dvořák began to accept the commissions from Novello & Co, for which Simrock threatened, but did not follow through on, legal action.
