= Chronological list of Czech classical composers =

List of selected composers born or trained in the Czech lands. The periods need to be taken with some reserve, because some composers, for example Jan Ladislav Dussek, composed music that was way ahead of their time and for example Antonín Dvořák himself was a romantic-classicist synthesist, so he does not have a perfect place in the list.

== Renaissance ==
- Jan Blahoslav (1523–1571)
- Jan Simonides Montanus (1530/1540–1587)
- Simon Bar Jona Madelka (1530/1550–~1598)
- Jiří Rychnovský (1545–1616)
- Jan Trojan Turnovský (before 1550–1606)
- Pavel Spongopaeus Jistebnický (1560–1616)
- Kryštof Harantz Polžic a Bezdružic (1564–1621)

== Baroque ==
- Jan Campanus Vodňanský (1572–1622)
- Adam Václav Michna z Otradovic (~1600–1676)
- Alberik Mazák (1609–1661)
- Pavel Josef Vejvanovský (~1640–1693)
- Heinrich Ignaz Franz von Biber (1644–1704) (born Stráž pod Ralskem, 50 miles n. of Prague)
- Václav Karel Holan Rovenský (~1644–1718)
- Jan Ignác František Vojta (1657 Černovice–1701 Praha)
- Jan Dismas Zelenka (1679–1745)
- Bohuslav Matěj Černohorský (1684–1742)
- Jan Josef Ignác Brentner (1689–1742)
- Šimon Brixi (1693–1735)
- František Antonín Václav Míča (1694–1744)
- František Jiránek (1698–1778)
- František Ignác Tůma (1704–1774)
- Josef Antonín Sehling (1710–1756)

== Classical era ==
- Johann Baptist Georg Neruda (born Jan Křtitel Jiří Neruda; approx 1707–1780)
- František Benda (a.k.a. Franz Benda; 1709–1786)
- Franz Xaver Richter (born in Moravia, 1709–1789)
- Jan Václav Antonín Stamic (generally known as Johann Wenzel Anton Stamitz; 1717–1757)
- Jiří Antonín Benda (a.k.a. George Benda; brother of Franz Benda; 1722–1795)
- Jiří Ignác Linek (1725–1791)
- Florian Leopold Gassmann (1729–1774)
- František Xaver Pokorný (1729–1794)
- František Kočvara (1730–1791)
- František Xaver Dušek (1731–1799)
- František Brixi (1732–1771)
- Josef Mysliveček (1737–1781)
- Johann Baptist Wanhal (1739–1813; born Jan Ignatius Vaňhal)
- Václav Pichl (1741–1805)
- Josef Bárta (1744–1787)
- Jiří Družecký (1745–1819)
- Karel Stamic (1745–1801)
- Jan Václav Stich (1746–1803)
- Leopold Koželuch (1747–1818)
- Josef Fiala (1748–1816)
- Antonín Kraft (1749–1820)
- Antonín Stamic (1750–1809)
- Antonio Rosetti (born Anton Rössler) (c. 1750–1792)
- Pavel Vranický (1756–1808)
- Franz Krommer (1759–1831; born as František Kramář)
- Jan Ladislav Dussek (1760–1812)
- Antonín Vranický (1761–1820)
- Adalbert Gyrowetz (1763–1850)
- Jakub Jan Ryba (1765–1815)

== Romantic ==
- Antonín Rejcha (1770–1836)
- Wenzeslaus Matiegka (1773–1830)
- Václav Jan Tomášek (1774–1850)
- František Doubravský (1790–1867)
- Jan Václav Voříšek (1791–1825)
- Ignaz Moscheles (1794–1870)
- František Škroup (1801–1862)
- Friederike Proch Benesch (1805 –1872)
- Alexander Dreyschock (1818–1869)
- Pavel Křížkovský (1820–1885)
- Bedřich Smetana (1824–1884)
- Hans Seeling (1828–1862)
- Vilém Blodek (1834–1874)
- Karel Bendl (1838–1897)
- Zdeněk Fibich (1850–1900)
- Wilhelm Kuhe (1823–1912)
- Antonín Dvořák (1841–1904)

== Modern/Contemporary ==
- Leoš Janáček (1854–1928)
- Bohumil Fidler (1860–1944)
- Josef Bohuslav Foerster (1859–1951)
- Gustav Mahler (1860–1911; born in Kaliště, Bohemia)
- Karel Kovařovic (1862–1920)
- Emil Votoček (1862–1950)
- František Drdla (1868–1944)
- Ludvík Čelanský (1870–1931)
- Vítězslav Novák (1870–1949)
- Julius Fučík (1872–1916)
- Josef Suk (1874–1935)
- Jan Kubelík (1880–1940)
- Jaroslav Křička (1882–1969)
- Ladislav Vycpálek (1882–1969)
- Václav Kaprál (1889–1947)
- Bohuslav Martinů (1890–1959)
- Otakar Jeremiáš (1892–1962)
- Alois Hába (1893–1973)
- Ervin Schulhoff (1894–1942)
- Pavel Bořkovec (1894–1972)
- Sláva Vorlová (1894–1973)
- František Brož (1896–1962)
- Jaromír Weinberger (1896–1967)
- Viktor Ullmann (1898–1944)
- Pavel Haas (1899–1944)
- Emil Hlobil (1901–1987)
- Iša Krejčí (1904–1968)
- Theodor Schaefer (1904–1969)
- Jaroslav Ježek (1906–1942)
- Václav Trojan (1907–1983)
- Miloslav Kabeláč (1908–1979)
- Jan Zdeněk Bartoš (1908–1981)
- Klement Slavický (1910–1999)
- Jan Kapr (1914–1988)
- Rafael Kubelík (1914–1996)
- Jan Hanuš (1915–2004)
- Vítězslava Kaprálová (1915–1940)
- Gideon Klein (1919–1945)
- Jiří Pauer (1919–2007)
- Ludvík Podéšť (1921–1968)
- Jan Novák (1921–1984)
- Zdeněk Liška (1922–1983)
- Radim Drejsl (1923–1953)
- Jiří Hudec (1923–1996)
- Lubor Bárta (1928–1972)
- Miloslav Ištvan (1928–1990)
- Luboš Fišer (1935–1999)
- Elena Petrová (1929–2002)
- Karel Janovický (born 1930)
- Karel Husa (1921–2016)
- Ilja Hurník (1922–2013)
- Viktor Kalabis (1923–2006)
- Jindřich Feld (1925–2007)
- Zdeněk Lukáš (1928–2007)
- Antonín Tučapský (1928–2014)
- Petr Eben (1929–2007)
- Ctirad Kohoutek (1929–2011)
- Marek Kopelent (1932–2023)
- Jan Klusák (born 1934)
- Jiří Bárta (1935–2012)
- Jiří Teml (born 1935)
- Tomáš Svoboda (1939–2022)
- Jaroslav Krček (born 1939)
- Ivana Loudová (1941–2017)
- Petr Kotík (born 1942)
- Otomar Kvěch (1950–2018)
- Jindra Nečasová Nardelli (born 1960)
