= List of Czech composers =

The following is a list of selected composers born or trained in the Czech lands.

== Active in the 14th and 15th century ==
- Domoslav (living at the turn of 13th and in the first half of 14th century)
- Jan of Jenštejn (1348–1400)
- Záviš of Zápy (c. 1350 – c. 1411)

== Active in the 16th century ==
- Jan Blahoslav (1523–1571)
- Jan Simonides Montanus (1530–1540 – 1587)
- Simon Bar Jona Madelka (1530–1550 – c. 1598)

== Active in the 16th and early 17th century ==
- Jiří Rychnovský (1545–1616)
- Jan Trojan Turnovský (before 1550–1606)
- Pavel Spongopaeus Jistebnický (1560–1616)
- Kryštof Harant (1564–1621)
- Jan Campanus Vodňanský (1572–1622)

== Active in the 17th century ==
- Adam Václav Michna z Otradovic (c. 1600 – 1676)
- Alberich Mazak (1609–1661)
- Pavel Josef Vejvanovský (c. 1640–1693)
- Heinrich Ignaz Franz von Biber (1644–1704)
- Jan Dismas Zelenka (1679–1745)

== Active in the 17th and early 18th century ==
- Václav Karel Holan Rovenský (c. 1644–1718)
- Jan Ignác František Vojta (c. 1660 – before 1725)
- Gottfried Finger (c. 1655–1730)

== Active in the 18th century ==
- Jan Dismas Zelenka (1679–1745)
- Bohuslav Matěj Černohorský (1684–1742)
- Jan Josef Ignác Brentner (1689–1742)
- Josef Antonín Plánický (1691–1732)
- Šimon Brixi (1693–1735)
- František Václav Míča (1694–1744)
- František Jiránek (1698–1778)
- Johann Stamitz (1717–1757)
- František Tůma (1704–1774)
- František Václav Habermann (1706–1783)
- Johann Baptist Georg Neruda (c.1707–1780)
- Franz Benda (1709–1786)
- Franz Xaver Richter (1709–1789)
- Christoph Willibald Gluck (1714–1787)
- Wenceslaus Wodiczka (c.1715–1775)
- Josef Seger (1716–1782)
- Georg Benda (1722–1795)
- Joseph Anton Steffan (1726–1797)
- František Xaver Pokorný (1729–1794)
- Florian Leopold Gassmann (1729–1774)
- František Kotzwara (1730–1791)
- František Xaver Dušek (1731–1799)
- František Brixi (1732–1771)
- Josef Mysliveček (1737–1781)
- Carl Stamitz (1745–1801)
- Jiří Ignác Linek (1725–1791)
- Antonio Rosetti (c.1750–1792)
- Anton Stamitz (1750–c.1809)

== Active in the 18th century and early 19th century ==
- Jan Antonín Koželuh (1738–1814)
- Johann Baptist Wanhal (1739–1813)
- Wenzel Pichl (1741–1805)
- Georg Druschetzky (1745–1819)
- Giovanni Punto (1746–1803)
- Leopold Koželuch (1747–1818)
- Josef Fiala (1748–1816)
- Antonín Kraft (1749–1820)
- Jan Křtitel Kuchař (1751–1829)
- Franz Götz (1755–1815)
- Pavel Vranický (1756–1808)
- Joseph Gelinek (1758–1825)
- Franz Krommer (1759–1831)
- Jan Ladislav Dussek (1760–1812)
- Antonín Vranický (1761–1820)
- Adalbert Gyrowetz (1763–1850)
- Jakub Jan Ryba (1765–1815)
- Antonín Reicha (1770–1836)
- Wenzel Thomas Matiegka (1773–1830)
- Václav Jan Tomášek (1774–1850)

== Active in the 19th century ==
- František Doubravský (1790–1867)
- Jan Václav Voříšek (1791–1825)
- Josef Proksch (1794–1864)
- Jan Kalivoda (1801–1866)
- František Škroup (1801–1862)
- Friederike Proch Benesch (1805–1872)
- Jan Nepomuk Škroup (1811–1892)
- Pavel Křížkovský (1820–1885)
- Bedřich Smetana (1824–1884)
- Josef Pischna (1826–1896)
- Vilém Blodek (1834–1874)
- Karel Bendl (1838–1897)
- Zdeněk Fibich (1850–1900)

== Active in the 19th century and early 20th century ==
- Wilhelm Kuhe (1823–1912)
- Antonín Dvořák (1841–1904)
- Johann Pehel (1852–1926)
- Leoš Janáček (1854–1928)
- Bohumil Fidler (1860–1944)
- Josef Bohuslav Foerster (1859–1951)
- Gustav Mahler (1860–1911)
- Emil Votoček (1862–1950)
- František Drdla (1868–1944)
- Ludvík Čelanský (1870–1931)
- Vítězslav Novák (1870–1949)
- Julius Fučík (1872–1916)
- Josef Suk (1874–1935)
- Otakar Ostrčil (1879–1935)
- Jan Kubelík (1880–1940)

== Active in the 20th century ==
- Rudolf Friml (1879–1972)
- Josef Karl Richter (1880–1933)
- Ladislav Vycpálek (1882–1969)
- Václav Kaprál (1889–1947)
- Bohuslav Martinů (1890–1959)
- Otakar Jeremiáš (1892–1962)
- Alois Hába (1893–1973)
- Ervin Schulhoff (1894–1942)
- Pavel Bořkovec (1894–1972)
- Sláva Vorlová (1894–1973)
- František Brož (1896–1962)
- Jaromír Weinberger (1896–1967)
- Erich Wolfgang Korngold (1897–1957)
- Viktor Ullmann (1898–1944)
- Pavel Haas (1899–1944)
- Adolf Strauss (1902–1944)
- Iša Krejčí (1904–1968)
- Theodor Schaefer (1904–1969)
- Jaroslav Ježek (1906–1942)
- Jiří Srnka (1907–1982)
- Václav Trojan (1907–1983)
- Miloslav Kabeláč (1908–1979)
- Jan Zdeněk Bartoš (1908–1981)
- Klement Slavický (1910–1999)
- Rafael Kubelík (1914–1996)
- Jan Hanuš (1915–2004)
- Emil Hlobil (1901–1987)
- Vítězslava Kaprálová (1915–1940)
- Gideon Klein (1919–1945)
- Jiří Pauer (1919–2007)
- Ludvík Podéšť (1921–1968)
- Jan Novák (1921–1984)
- Zdeněk Liška (1922–1983)
- Radim Drejsl (1923–1953)
- Jiří Hudec (1923–1996)
- Lubor Bárta (1928–1972)
- Miloslav Ištvan (1928–1990)
- Luboš Fišer (1935–1999)
- Elena Petrová (1929–2002)
- Milan Harašta (1919-1946)

== Active in the 20th century and early 21st century ==
- František Bartoš (1905–1973)
- Karel Husa (1921–2016)
- Ilja Hurník (1922–2013)
- Viktor Kalabis (1923–2006)
- František Kovaříček (1924–2003)
- Zdeněk Lukáš (1928–2007)
- Antonín Tučapský (1928–2014)
- Petr Eben (1929–2007)
- Karel Janovický (born 1930)
- Marek Kopelent (1932–2023)
- Jan Klusák (born 1934)
- Jiří Bárta (1935–2012)
- Jiří Teml (born 1935)
- Tomáš Svoboda (1939–2022)
- Jaroslav Krček (born 1939)
- Ivana Loudová (born 1941)
- Edvard Schiffauer (born 1942)
- Otomar Kvěch (1950–2018)
- Sylvie Bodorová (born 1954)
- Jan Jirásek (born 1955)
- Jiří Gemrot (born 1957)
- Martin Smolka (born 1959)
- Vít Zouhar (born 1966)
- Šimon Voseček (born 1978)
