= Simon Bar Jona Madelka =

Czech composer

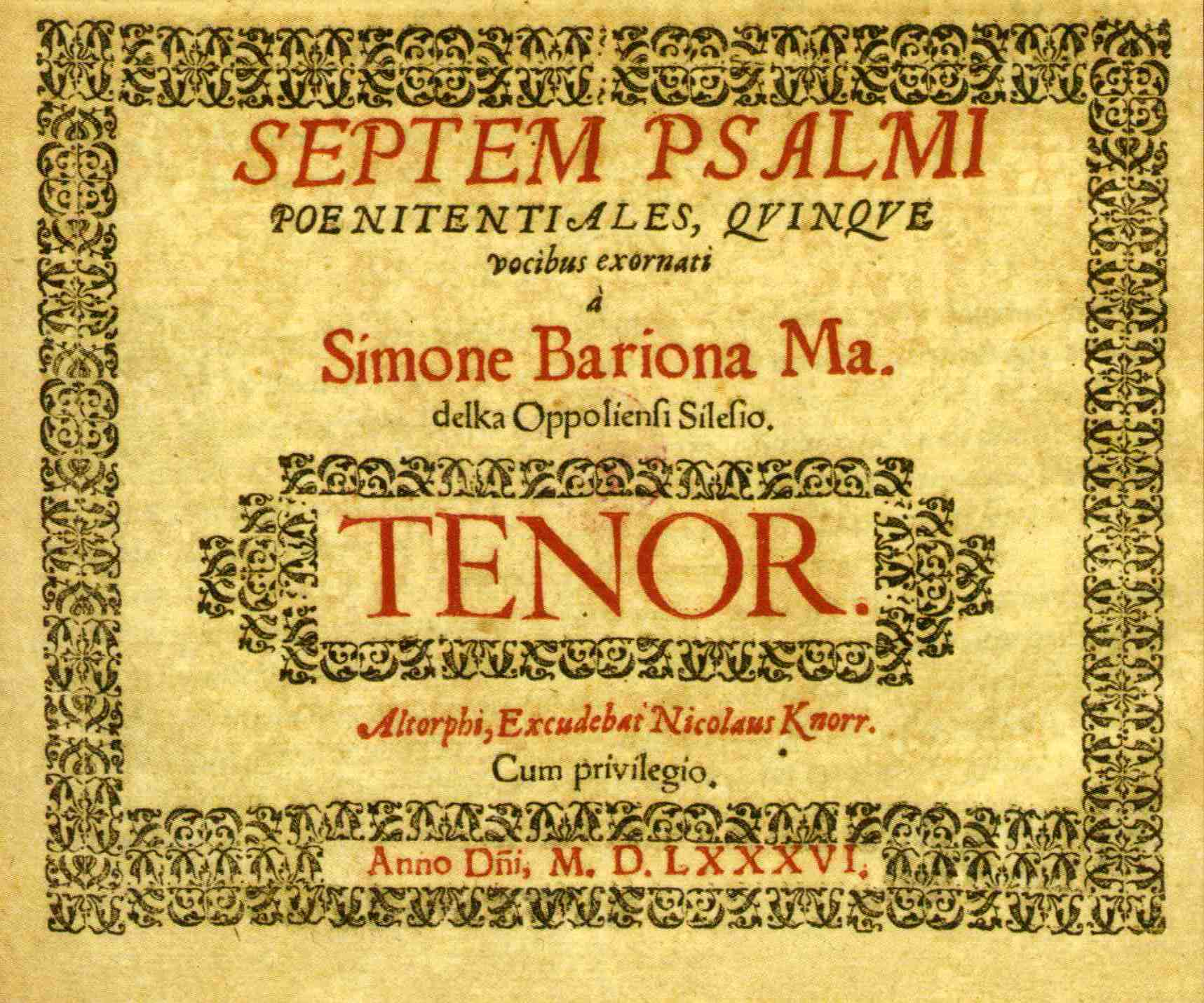
The cover of the Seven Penitential Psalms for Five Voices by Simon Bar Jona Madelka

Simon Bar Jona Madelka or Šimon Bariona Oppollensis (before 1550 in Opole – c. 1598 in Plzeň) was a Czech composer. In addition to being a composer, he was also a member of the butcher's guild in the Plzeň. Madelka published two music collections.

== Biography ==
Madelka may have come from Opole, as suggested by the cognomen Oppolensis, preserved in the collection of his music. The surname Madelka was also quite common both in Silesia and Opole. He came to Western Bohemia probably in consequence of culmination of the reformation wave in Opole Region in the middle of the 16th century. Madelka was a Catholic, and his religion may have been the main reason for his changing residences.

In 1575 he was entered to the register of the butcher's guild in Plzeň, and in 1580 became a master butcher. In 1585 he became the member of the guild's board of elders. He died probably during the epidemic of a plague that killed 1300 to 1600 citizens of Plzeň in 1598.

His name appears in the manuscripts exclusively as Šimon Bariona; the other variants of his name, Bar Jona and Madelka figure only in his printed music. He is mentioned in various musical sources with other European composers such as Clemens non Papa, Jacobus Vaet, Thomas Crecquillon, Michael de Buissons and Orlando Lasso. He was the contemporary of Jacobus Gallus, Jan Simonides Montanus, Pavel Spongopaeus Jistebnický, Ondřej Chrysoponus Jevíčský, and Jan Traján Turnovský.

His compositions number thirty five sacral works, but only one of them is well preserved: the collection of Seven Penitential Psalms, published in 1586 by German printer Nicholas Knorr in Altdorf bei Nürnberg. His second published composition, printed by Jiří Nigrin in Prague, as well as the rest of his output, is preserved only in fragments.

His first printed composition, Canticum Beatissimae virginis Mariae, was published in Prague in 1578. It was dedicated to the Abbot of Teplá, Jan Mauskönig. The second printed edition, the Seven Penitential Psalms, was dedicated to the Provost of the Chotěšov monastery, Albert Jordán of Mohelnice.

== Works ==
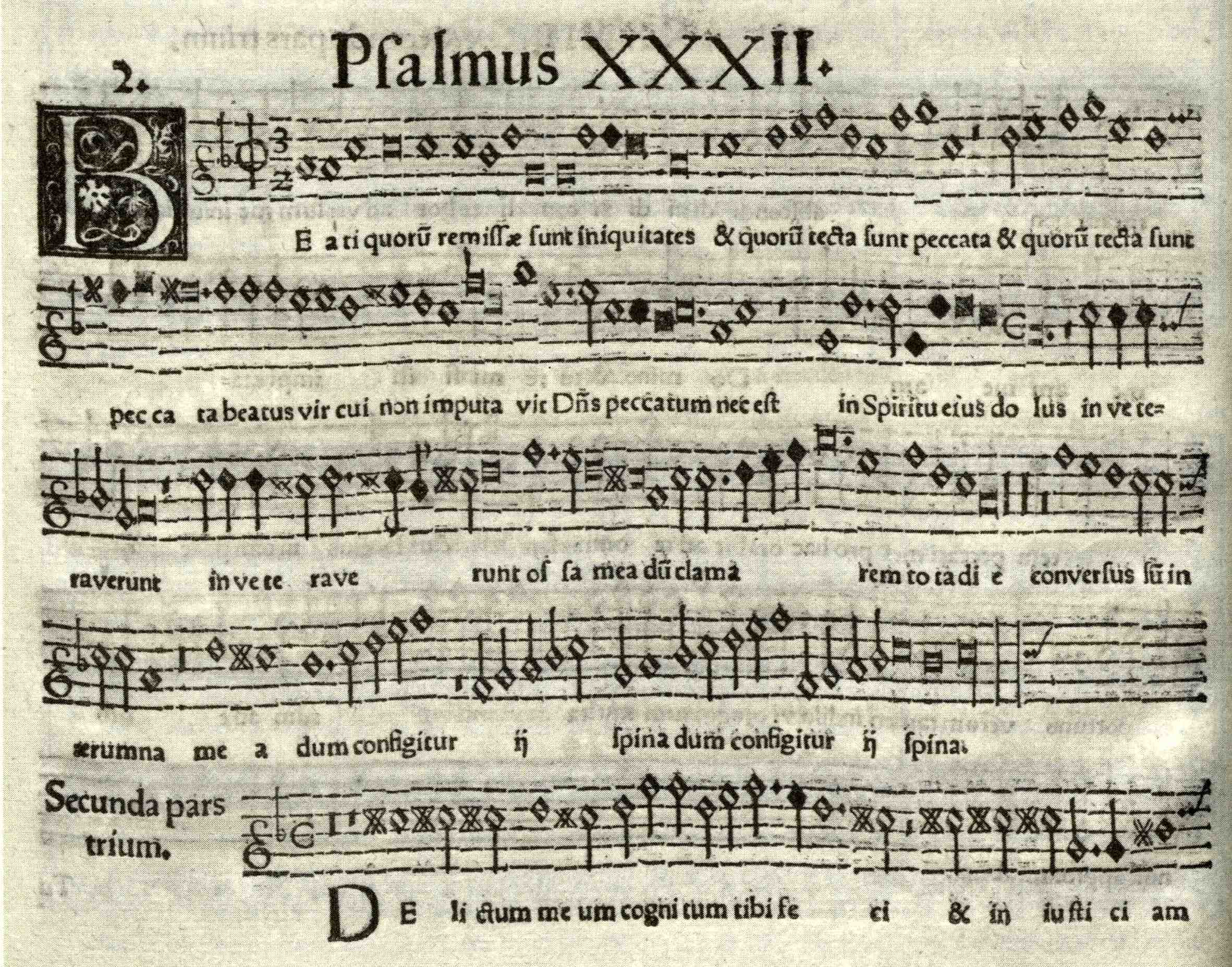
Ps. XXXII

- Canticum Beatissimae virginis Mariae
- Seven Penitential Psalms for Five Voices (in Czech: Sedm kajících žalmů pětihlasem vyzdobených)

It consists of:

- Ps. VI. Domine ne in furore tuo arguas me
- Ps. XXXII. Beati quorum remissae sunt iniquitates
- Ps. XXXVIII. Domine ne in furore tuo arguas me
- Ps. LI. Miserere mei, Deus
- Ps. CII Domine exaudi orationem meam
- Ps. CXXX. De profundis
- Ps. CXLIII. Domine exaudi orationem meam
- Quomodo confitebor tibi, Domine - motet
