= Jiří Bárta =

Czech pianist and composer

Jiří Bárta (19 June 1935 – 4 January 2012) was a Czech pianist and composer.

== Biography ==
Jiří Bárta was born in Šumice, Uherské Hradiště District. In his youth, he studied piano with organist and composer Emil Hába (1900–1982). He attended the Brno Conservatory from 1954 to 1958 studying piano with František Schäfer and music composition with František Suchý. He continued to study composition at the Janáček Academy of Music and Performing Arts under Vilém Petrželka and Theodor Schaefer, graduating in 1962 with his Concerto for Orchestra. Far more influential for Bárta were his post-graduate studies with Miloslav Ištvan and Ctirad Kohoutek at the Janáček Academy. These courses exposed him to the Second Viennese School, Bartók and other 20th-century classics, experimental and electronic music.

Bárta was a long-time professor of music theory and composition at the Brno Conservatory. His pupils include Alexander Müller, Karel Škarka and Jaroslav Kopecký.

For his compositions, Bárta received the Union of Czech Composers and Concert Artists Award (1986) for Concerto da camera for piano and string orchestra, Czech Music Fund Award (1990) for Reliéfy, and the Czech Music Fund Prize (1991) for Music for Strings „In memoriam Miloslav Ištvan“.

Bárta died in Brno at the age of 76.

== Selected works ==
Stage

- Pandořina skříňka (Pandora's Box), Dance Fairy-Tale for Children (1969)
- Tři baletní scény: Passacaglia – Hledání – Výstraha (3 Ballet Scenes: Passacaglia – Seeking – Warning) (1972–1973)
- Čitra (Chitra; Tschitra), Chamber Opera in 1 act (1994); libretto by Věra Kliková after Rabindranath Tagore

Orchestral

- Partita for string orchestra (1961)
- Koncert pro orchestr (Concerto for Orchestra) (1962)
- Barokní suita in D (Baroque Suite in D) (1973)
- Reliéfy (Reliefs) (1988)
- Hudba pro smyčce „In memoriam Miloslav Ištvan“ (Music for Strings "In memoriam Miloslav Ištvan") for string orchestra (1990)
- Kánony a znělky (Canons and Tunes) for string orchestra (1992)
- Dithyramb, Overture

Concertante

- Concerto grosso for 2 violins, cello and string orchestra (1965)
- Concerto da camera for piano and string orchestra (1984)
- Concerto for viola, chamber string orchestra and piano (2001)
- Concertino for piano, harpsichord and chamber ensemble (2002)

Chamber music

- Suite for bass clarinet and harpsichord (1962)
- Fragmenty (Fragments) for clarinet and piano (1967)
- Studie (Studies) for 2 accordions and piano (1968)
- Progressioni for string quartet (1969)
- Kontemplace (Contemplation) for accordion (1971)
- 3 Capriccia (3 Capriccios) for accordion (1976)
- Lyrické variace (Lyric Variations) for violin and piano (1980)
- Melancholie a vzdor (Melancholy and Defiance) for violin, cello and piano (1986)
- Tesklivě a vzdorně (Wistfully and Defiantly), Trio for violin, cello and piano (1987)
- Trio for oboe, clarinet and bassoon (1989)
- Variace z podzimu (Autumn Variations) for bass clarinet and piano (1989)
- Moments musicaux for string quartet (1997)
- Musica per tre, Composition for clarinet, bassoon and piano (1998)
- Transformace (Transformations) for 2 percussionists (2001)
- Zátiší (Still Life) for violin, clarinet and piano (2002)
- Konfrontace (Confrontation) for bass clarinet and double bass

Piano

- Preludium and Toccata (1966)
- Iluminace (Illuminations) for 2 pianos (1977)
- 2 Impromptus (1984)
- Pozdravy mistrům (1996)
- Sonatina difficile (1997)
- 3 Capricci in C (2000)
- Tři etudy (3 Etudes) (2000)

Vocal

- Romantické písně na verše francouzských básníků (Romantic Songs to Verses by French Poets) for soprano, violin, horn and piano (1965)
- Přípovídky od času a od muziky (Tales of Time and Music) for soprano, flute and piano (1992); words by John Amos Comenius
- Nápoj z révy, Šestero úvah (Drink of the Vine: Six Considerations) for baritone and piano (1998); words by John Amos Comenius
- Řeči královské (Royal Speeches) for tenor, flute and guitar (2003)
