= František Maxián =

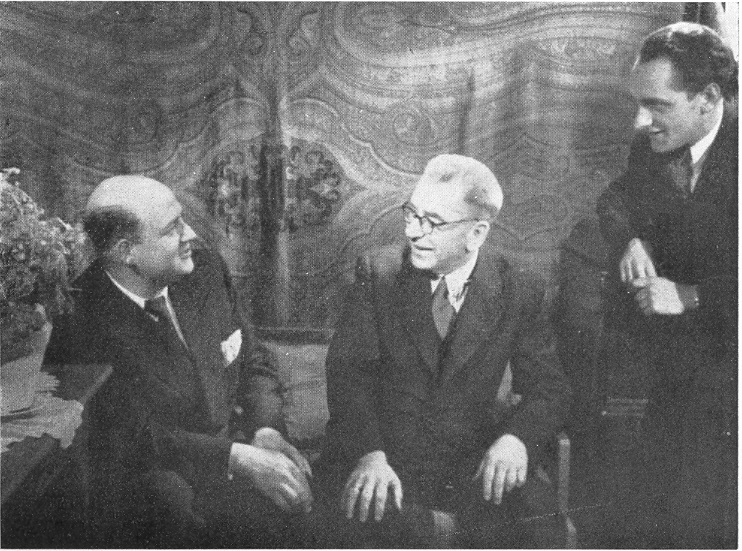
- Maxián (left), Vilém Kurz (center) and Zdeněk Jílek (right)

Background information
- Born: 9 November 1907; Teplice, Bohemia, Austria-Hungary
- Died: 18 January 1971 (aged 63)
- Occupations: Pianist, music educator
- Instrument: Piano

František Maxián (9 November 1907 – 18 January 1971) was a Czech pianist and music educator.

== Life and performing career ==
František Maxián was born in Teplice. He studied at the local Conservatory as a student of Roman Veselý, then continued his studies at the Prague Conservatory with Vilém Kurz. After graduating, he worked as a pianist in Czech Radio. Later he returned to piano studies, and his solo performances began to attract attention. He began to perform internationally, and was elected Vice-Chairman of the Chopin Competition in Warsaw in 1949. Maxián performed a repertoire including both classical and contemporary composers. He died in 1971 and is buried not far from his teacher Vilém Kurz at Slavín, the Vyšehrad Cemetery in Prague.

== Career as an educator ==
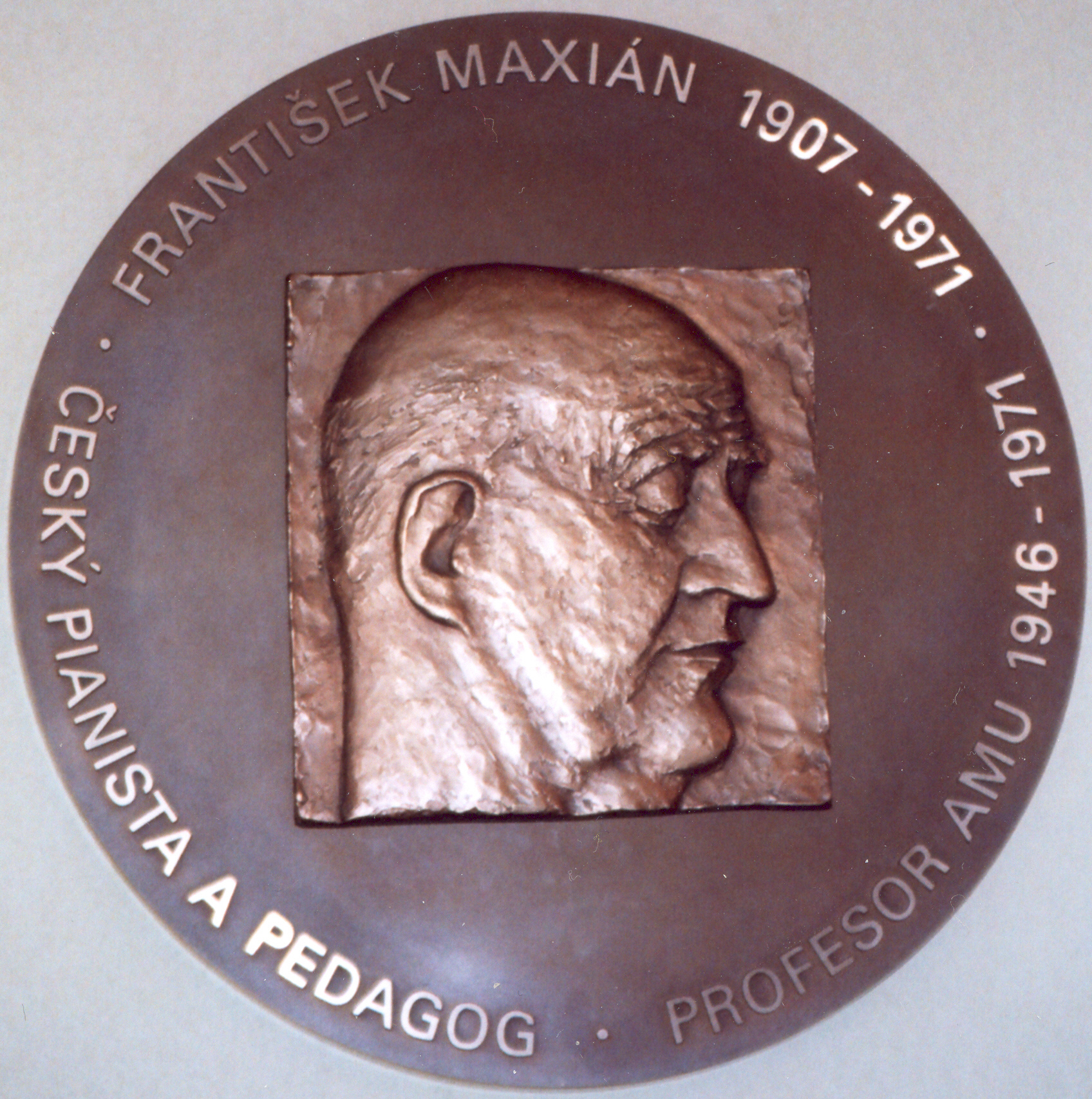
Memorial plaque at Malá Strana

From 1927 to 1928, Maxián was active as a music school teacher in Dubrovnik, and in 1939 became a professor at the Prague Conservatory. In 1946 he became a professor at the Prague Academy of Performing Arts. Notable students include Jan Panenka, Peter Toperczer, Marian Lapšanský, Josef Hála, Antonín Kubálek, E. Glancová and Sláva Vorlová. See: List of music students by teacher: K to M#František Maxián.
