= Elena Petrová =

Czech composer

Elena Petrová, née Krupková (9 November 1929 – 10 April 2002) was a Czech composer. She was born in Modrý Kameň, and studied piano with Karel Hoffmeister and composition with Jan Kapr and Miloslav Istvan at the Janáček Academy of Music. After completing her studies, she taught music theory at the Charles University in Prague.

== Works ==
Petrová composed for orchestra, chamber ensemble, stage and opera performance, choral and vocal works, and incidental music for ballets, television and radio. Selected works include:

Stage

- Slavík a růže (The Nightingale and the Rose), Ballet after Oscar Wilde (1969)
- Podivuhodná raketa (The Remarkable Rocket), Ballet after Oscar Wilde (1970)
- Slunečnice (Sunflower), Ballet after Ovid (1973)
- Kdyby se slunce nevrátilo (Should the Sun Not Return), a six-act opera after Si le soleil ne revenait pas... by Charles Ferdinand Ramuz (1982–1983)

Orchestral

- Symphony No. 1 (1968)
- Slavnostní předehra (Festive Ouverture) (1975)
- Symphony No. 2 (1976)
- Smutecní hudba (Mourning Music; Trauermusik) (1981)
- Passacaglia (1982)
- Slavnostní hudba (Festive Music) (1982)
- Symphony No. 3 (1990)
- Longing Odysseus

Chamber music

- Eklogy (Eclogues) for bass clarinet (1965)
- String Quartet No. 1 (1965)
- Sonata for viola and piano (1966)
- String Quartet No. 2 (1967) - received II. prize at the international competition in Philadelphia, 1968
- Invokace (Invocation) for bass clarinet and piano (1972)
- Pantomima (Pantomime) for viola d'amore solo (1973)
- Capricci for bass clarinet and piano (1991)
- String Quartet No. 3 (1991)
- Capriccia (Capriccios) for bass clarinet and percussion (1992)
- Čarování (Sortilegio) for flute, piano and percussion (1997)
- Mýty (Myths), 4 Pieces for flute solo (1998)
- Sonata for violin and piano

Keyboard

- Sonata No. 1 for piano (1960)
- Inspirace (Inspirations) for piano 4-hands (1973) - received I. prize at the international competition in Denver, 1975
- Impromptus I. (Impromptu No. 1) for piano (1976)
- Preludium a passacaglia (Preludium and Passacaglia) for organ (1980)
- Impromptus II. (Impromptu No. 2) for piano (1991)
- Sonata No. 2 for piano (1992)
- Čtyři impromptus (4 Impromptus) for piano (1996)
- Preludia (Preludes) for piano

Vocal

- Písně o čase (Songs about Time) for baritone and piano (1958)
- Madrigaly "Catulli liber carminum", Madrigals for mixed chamber chorus (1966, revised 1976)
- Noci (To the Night), Cantata for tenor, mixed chorus and orchestra (1968); words by Vítězslav Nezval
- Pět slovenských písní (5 Slovak Songs) for men's choir (1969)
- Vzývání (Invocation), Song Cycle for male chamber chorus (1977); words by the composer
- Tanbakzan, Melodrama for speaker and chamber chorus (1981)
- Komedie dell'arte for voice and piano (1991)
- Sluneční sonáta (Sunny Sonata) for soprano and piano (1992)
- Nářek královny Ningal (Mourning of Queen Ningal) for soprano and chamber chorus (1992)
- Oranžové vánky (Orange Breezes), Song Cycle for baritone and piano (2000); words by Federico García Lorca
- Akvarely (Watercolours), Song Cycle for men's choir
- Písně starého měsíce (Songs of an Old Moon) for soprano and chamber orchestra
- Žluté balady (Yellow Ballads) for voice and piano

=== Discography ===
- Česká soudobá hudba – Klavírní tvorba (Contemporary Czech Music – Piano Works) – Český Rozhlas CR 0124-2 231 (1999)

Impromptus pro klavír (4 Impromptus for Piano); Jana Palkovská (piano)

- Due Boemi – Česká soudobá hudba (Due Boemi – Czech Contemporary Music) – Supraphon SU 811441-2; Panton 81 1441-2111 (1995)

Invokace (Invocation) for bass clarinet and piano; Josef Horák (bass clarinet); Emma Kovárnová (piano)
