= Jan Hanuš =

Jan Hanuš may refer to:

- Jan Hanuš (composer) (1915–2004), Czech composer
- Jan Hanuš (footballer) (born 1988), Czech footballer
