= Vladimír Sommer =

Czech composer

Vladimír Sommer (28 February 1921 in Dolní Jiřetín near Most – 8 September 1997 in Prague) was a Czech composer.

Sommer began his studies at the Prague Conservatory, where he studied violin with Bedřich Voldan and composition with Karel Janeček. He then continued his education at the Academy of Arts and Music with Pavel Bořkovec. His first job was a composition teacher, and he eventually became a professor in the Music Department of Charles University. Sommer wrote three symphonies, an overture, one cello concerto and one violin concerto, chamber music, and choral pieces. He died in 1997 in Prague.

== Selected works ==
- Sonata for two Violins, 1948
- Violin Concerto in G minor, 1950
- Antigone, Overture to the Tragedy of Sophocles, 1957
- Vocal Symphony for Contralto, Speaker, Choir, and Orchestra, 1958
- Prince Bajaja, Orchestral Suite, 1970
- Symphony for Strings, 1977
- Sinfonia da Requiem for Soloists, Choir, and Orchestra, 1978
- Concerto for Violoncello and Orchestra, 1979
- Piano Sonata, 1980
- String Quartet in B minor, 1981
- String Quartet in D minor, 1955
