= Domoslav =

Domoslav (also written Domaslav), was a Czech hymnographer, living probably at the turn of 13th and in the first half of 14th century. Domoslav is one of the first documented Czech composers.

== Life and work ==
Domoslav was the Dominican friar, living during the reign of last Přemyslids and probably also in the beginning of the reign of John of Luxembourg. His name was preserved in acrostic of the musical sequence De superna yerarchia. The first letters of the strophes create the words Damozslaus predicator. It is also written in manuscript of The Legend of Saint Ludmila from 1416. Domoslav is also the author of the sequence about Saint Wenceslas Dulce melos cum concentu and rhyming composition Officium o svatém Václavu a svaté Ludmile (Officium about St.Wenceslas and St.Ludmila).

He was the founder of his own school of poetry. At the same time originated many Czech sequences, that were written either directly from him or came from his school, e.g.

- Ave, caro Christi regis - to the fest of Corpus Christi
- Pleno cantu cordis - about Saint Ludmila
- Hodierne lux dici - about Saint Adalbert of Prague (Svatý Vojtěch)
- Plaudant chori monachorum - about Saint Procopius of Sázava (Svatý Prokop)

The oldest record of texts is a compound of Dražický misál (Missal of Dražice) from 1340, the melody to the first sequence of Dulce melos was found in files of archbishop Arnošt z Pardubic from 1363. Melody to the second sequence was found in "Vyšehradský sborník" (Anthology of Vyšehrad) from the second half of 15th century.

== Sources ==
- Československý hudební slovník I (A–L), 1963, SHV, Prague
- A. Škarka: Dominikán Domoslav a čeští hymnografové jeho směru, Prague, 1950, VI, 1/43
- G. M. Dreves, C. Blume: Ein Jahrtausend Latenischer Hymnendichtung, Leipzig, 1909
