= Jan Trojan Turnovský =

Czech composer

Jan Trojan Turnovský (before 1550 – 1606) was a Czech Renaissance composer. He became known in the second half of the 1570s. His compositions are included in the most important sources of Utraquist polyphony.

== Biography ==
In the oldest sources, his name was Latinized to Traianus Turnovinus or Traianus Gregorides Turnovinus. Later he began to use the name Jan. The sources from Benešov call him "kněz Jan Traian" (priest Jan Traian).

Very little is known about his early life. He was born in Turnov, and his father was a baker. The oldest known mention of his life dates from 1564 when he was matriculated at the Charles University in Prague. He was matriculated together with several other composers, Jiří Rychnovský and Pavel Spongopaeus Jistebnický among others. However, it is not entirely clear whether they really studied there.

As an Utraquist priest he served in Davle (1579), and the same year he was possibly active also in Mladá Boleslav. Later he moved to Netvořice (1581), Benešov (1587), and Sepekov (1595, probably before 1590).

Turnovský was married two times. He married his first wife Kateřina on 11 November 1579 in Mladá Boleslav. In 1604, he — together with his second wife Zuzana Jezberová — bought a house in Benešov. The payment from 1606 is the last mention of his life.

== Style and works ==
The oldest dated composition originates from 1572, the earliest work was composed in 1602. Fifteen of his forty compositions have been preserved completely. A half of Trojan's compositions is preserved and carefully dated in the collection Benešovský kancionál (Benešov Hymnbook), collected by Václav Kolářovic (died 1596). One Latin ordinarium, two responsories and eleven Czech songs have been completely preserved. In addition to this Trojan composed six Czech and four Latin motets, two song fragments, five Czech plenaria and seven compositions intended for Utraquist religious service. These compositions are preserved in fragments.

Some of his works are preserved in the sources of Czech literary fraternities in Prague, Rokycany, Hradec Králové and Jaroměř.

Trojan's compositions are remarkable for their well-handled polyphony technique and careful work with words in relation to music.

Selected compositions:

- Missa super Jerusalem cito veniet (1578) - the most valuable composition, written to the theme of Jacob Clemens non Papa
- Jezu Kriste Vykupiteli - Czech motet
- Vstalť jest z mrtvých Kristus Pán - Easter motet
