= Kaliště (Pelhřimov District) =

- Municipality
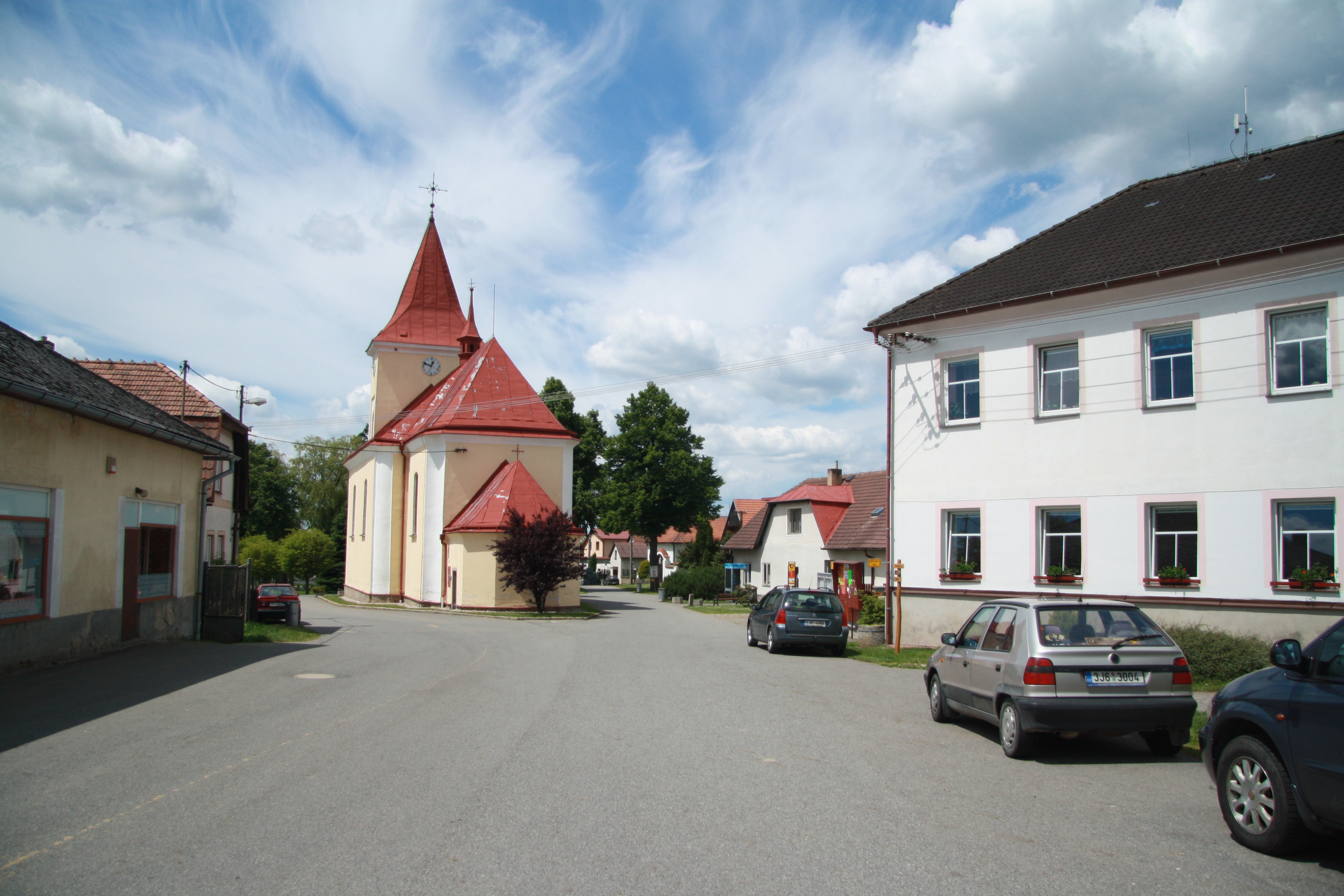
- Centre of Kaliště

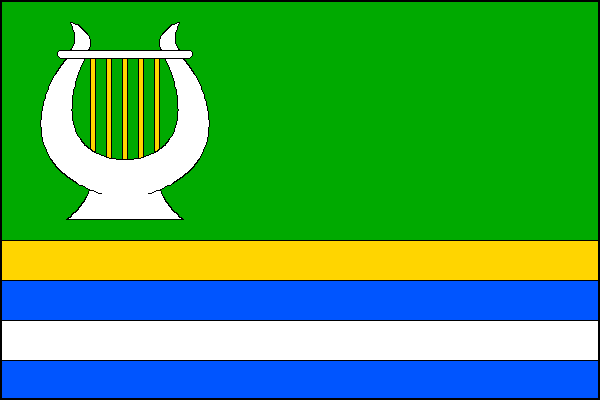
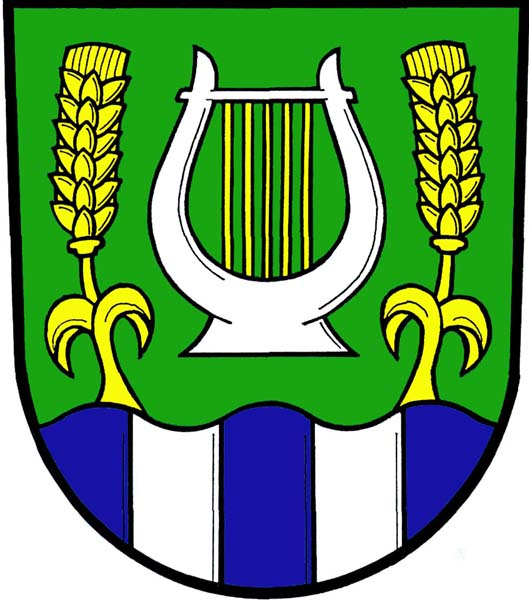
- Flag Coat of arms

- Location in the Czech Republic
- Coordinates: 49°35′34″N 15°18′15″E
- Country: Czech Republic
- Region: Vysočina
- District: Pelhřimov
- First mentioned: 1318

Area
  - Total: 12.42 km^{2} (4.80 sq mi)
- Elevation: 601 m (1,972 ft)

Population (2026-01-01)
  - Total: 398
  - Density: 32.0/km^{2} (83.0/sq mi)
- Time zone: UTC+1 (CET)
  - Summer (DST): UTC+2 (CEST)
- Postal codes: 394 51, 396 01
- Website: www.obeckaliste.cz

Kaliště (German: Kalischt) is a municipality and village in Pelhřimov District in the Vysočina Region of the Czech Republic. It has about 400 inhabitants. The village is notable for being the birthplace of the composer Gustav Mahler.

== Administrative division ==
Kaliště consists of five municipal parts (in brackets population according to the 2021 census):

- Kaliště (277)
- Háj (20)
- Holušice (32)
- Podivice (30)
- Staré Hutě (4)

== Geography ==
Kaliště is located about 19 kilometres (12 mi) north of Pelhřimov and 29 km (18 mi) northwest of Jihlava. It lies in the Křemešník Highlands. The highest point is the hill Podivický vrch at 638 m (2,093 ft) above sea level. There are several small fishponds in the municipal territory.

== Etymology ==
The name Kaliště is derived from the Old Czech word kališče, i.e. 'puddle', 'mud'.

== History ==
The first written mention of Kaliště is from 1318, when it was a property of the Vyšehrad Chapter. During the Hussite Wars, King Sigismund seized the property and in 1436 pledged it to the Trčka of Lípa family. In 1698, it was purchased by the Count Jan Jáchym Harrach, who had built a castle here. He passed it to the Austrian Trautson noble family in 1707. The castle was demolished in 1801.

== Demographics ==
Historical population

Year	Pop.	±%
1869	990	—
1880	979	−1.1%
1890	1,046	+6.8%
1900	1,040	−0.6%
1910	972	−6.5%

Year	Pop.	±%
1921	906	−6.8%
1930	815	−10.0%
1950	638	−21.7%
1961	615	−3.6%
1970	511	−16.9%

Year	Pop.	±%
1980	417	−18.4%
1991	334	−19.9%
2001	333	−0.3%
2011	336	+0.9%
2021	363	+8.0%

Source: Censuses

== Transport ==
There are no railways or major roads passing through the municipality.

== Sights ==
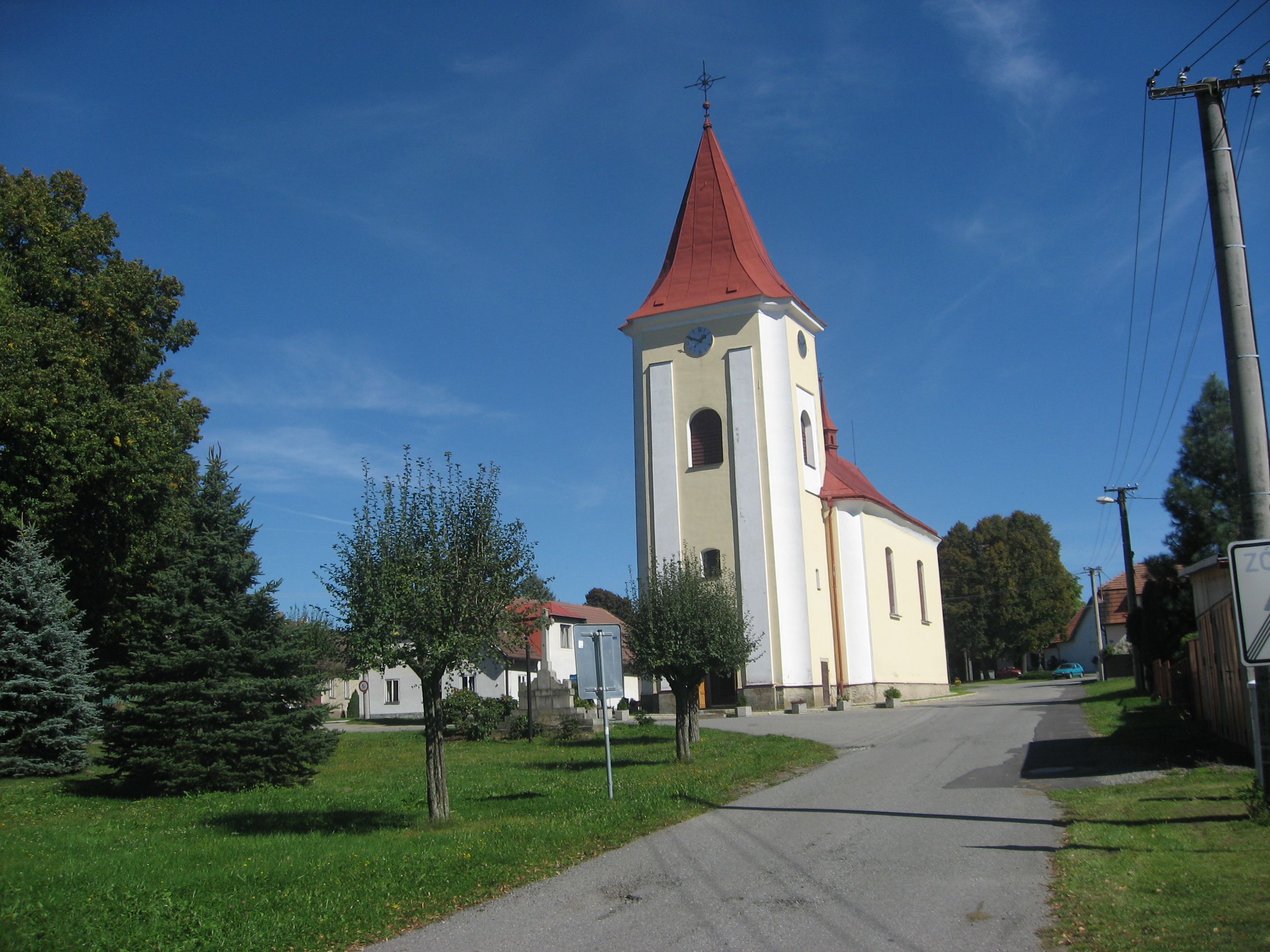
Church of Saint John the Baptist

The main landmark of Kaliště is the Church of Saint John the Baptist. It is a rural Baroque church from the early 19th century.

== Notable people ==
- Gustav Mahler (1860–1911), composer
