= Wilhelm Kuhe =

Czech pianist, piano teacher, composer and administrator

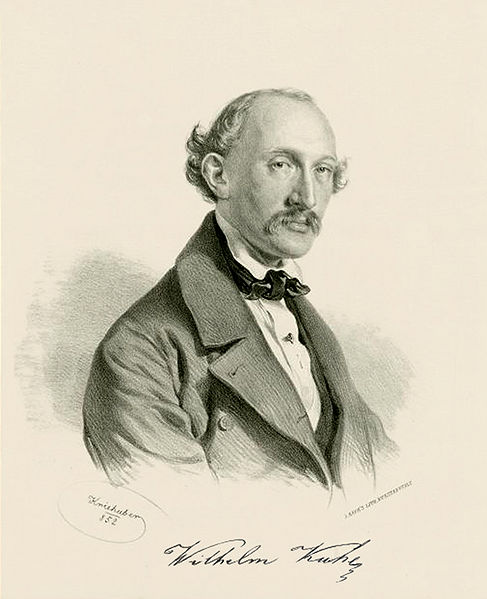
Wilhelm Kuhe (1823–1912)

Wilhelm Kuhe (10 December 1823 – 8 October 1912) was a Czech pianist and piano teacher, composer and administrator born in the city of Prague (modern-day Czech Republic), in the first half of the nineteenth century.

== Life ==
He exhibited a precocious taste for music, and at the age of four picked out Paganini's melodies on the pianoforte from memory. He was taught music by Václav Tomášek, having Julius Schulhoff as a fellow student. He lived in Upper Austria in 1843–44, studying music and preparing for a concert tour with great success in 1844 at Linz, Salzburg, Innsbruck, Augsburg, Munich, and then at Stuttgart. During his stay in Stuttgart in 1845 he made the acquaintance of a singer possessed of one of the most beautiful baritone voices he had ever had the pleasure to hear called Pischek. They both visited London on the morning of May 1 that year and the following year he played with great success at Mr. Ella's Musical Union in Mayseder's trio. His first concert in London was arranged by Moscheles at the Beethoven Rooms on Harley Street. In 1847, at the age of 24, he settled in England, dividing his time between London and Brighton, where he attained popularity as a pianoforte teacher, performer and promoter of concerts.

With remarkable enterprise and spirit, Kuhe showed great enterprise by establishing the annual festival at Brighton which was held by him as a joint conductor from 1870 to 1882, wherein he encouraged native talent by the new works composed at his instance and produced by him, among which, Virginia Gabriel's Evangeline in 1873; John Francis Barnett's cantata, The Good Shepherd, in 1876; Frederic Clay's Lalla Rookh in 1877 and 1878; Frederic Hymen Cowen's The Deluge, and Alfred Cellier's Suite Symphonique in 1878; Walter Macfarren's overture Hero and Leander, Henry Gadsby's The Lord of the Isles, Thomas Wingham's Concert Overture in A, and Sloper's suite in 1879; Leslie's cantata, The First Christmas Morn, Arthur Herbert Jackson's Ballet Suite and W. Macfarren's Symphony in B♭ in 1880: W. Macfarren's Konzertstück in B♭, played by Miss Kuhe, in 1881; Frederick Corder's orchestral Nocturne in 1882, in addition to William Sterndale Bennett's The Woman of Samaria and Arthur Sullivan's The Martyr of Antioch, under the respective direction of their composers. He occasionally appeared in London, where he gave an annual concert in 1846. He was appointed a Professor of the Royal Academy of Music in 1886, position which he held until 1904. His numerous compositions include many drawing-room pieces, fantasias, and studies. He also published many transcriptions and songs.

He published his memoirs, My Musical Recollections, in 1896; the book preserves a number of anecdotes about Wolfgang Amadeus Mozart that Kuhe learned from Wenzel Swoboda, an elderly Prague double bass player who had performed under Mozart's direction. It also preserves an anecdote about Anna Gottlieb, who had performed under Mozart as Pamina in the premiere of The Magic Flute. The volume was read by the late nineteenth century English novelist George Gissing in October 1896.

== List of works ==
=== Fantasias ===
- Fantasie on Sir Arthur Sullivan’s opera The Chieftain
- Fantasie brilliante on motifs from Bizet's Carmem
- Fantasie on motifs from Verdi's La Forza del Destino
- Fantasie on Verdi's opera La Traviata
- Grande fantasie de concert on Flotow's Martha
- Fantasia on Austrian Anthem
- Victoria Fantasia on National Anthem
- Fantasie on Meyerbeer's Dinorah
- Fantasia on Rule Britannia

=== Études ===
- Andante and etude Op. 14
- Casta Diva, study in the cantabile from Bellini’s Norma
- Charlie is my darling, study in octaves
- Silvery Shower, caprice étude Op. 78
- Étude de concert

=== Salon music ===
- Three Songs without words Op. 12
- Le Carillon Op. 13
- Chanson d'Amour
- Romance sans Paroles Op. 17
- Le Feu Follet, scherzo capriccioso Op. 38
- Gondola
- Rosée du soir

=== Other works ===
- Lieder ohne Worte Op. 12
- Galop di Bravura from Howard Glover’s opera Ruy Blas
- The Gipsies Revel
- Graziella, Op.60
- Scène bohémienne, Op.138
- Corbeille de Fleurs Valse

== See also ==
- List of Czech composers
