= Otomar Kvěch =

Czech music composer and teacher (1950–2018)

Otomar Kvěch (25 May 1950 – 16 March 2018) was a Czech music composer and teacher.

== Biography ==
Kvěch was born in Prague, Czechoslovakia. His father was a sound engineer with Czechoslovak Radio, and later held technical jobs in various industrial companies. Kvěch's mother was a shop-assistant.

In 1955, he had his first lessons in piano. He prepared for three years for his entry exam to the Prague Conservatory, and graduated after studying composition with Jan Zdeněk Bartoš and organ with Joseph Kuban. After 1969, he studied composition at the Prague Academy of Performing Arts with Jiří Pauer, as well as one semester with Emil Hlobil. After graduation, he worked as an accompanist at the Opera National Theatre.

In 1972, he married Miluška Wagnerová, a fellow-student from his organ class, and had daughters Eva (b. 1974) and Martina (b. 1977). In 1976, he returned from a yearlong national service in the Army Art Ensemble, and took a job as music director in Czechoslovak Radio. In 1980, he took a position as Secretary of the Composers Union, which allowed him better opportunities for composition.

In 1990, political and social changes in his country forced Kvěch to return to a job at Czechoslovak Radio as programme manager and music editor. At the same time, he began teaching music theory and composition at Prague Conservatory. In 2000, Kvěch's wife died, and three years later he married Jana Smékalová, long-time programme manager of Supraphon. From 2000 to 2018, he was employed at the Jewish Museum in Prague.

As a composer, Kvěch adopted a number of technical elements (concepts of "colour") from "Musica Nova," and transplanted these into the "Classical" approach. At the time of his death, Kvěch was Head of the Department of Composition at the National Conservatory in Prague and taught music analysis at the Academy of Music. He also worked as a music editor at the Czech radio station Vltava. He died in Prague on 16 March 2018.

== Works ==
Orchestral

- Pocta Bachovi (Homage to Bach), Suite (1971)
- Předehra (Overture) (1979)
- Symphony in E♭ major (1982)
- Karneval světa (Carnival of the World), Overture (1983)
- Symphony in D major (1984)
- RUR: Passacaglia na námět hry K. Čapka (RUR: Passacaglia Inspired by a Play of Karel Čapek) (1986)
- Symphony in E minor for string quartet and orchestra (1987)
- Serenata notturna for string orchestra (1996)
- Nocturnalia for woodwind ensemble (1997)
- Serenáda na témata českých koled (Serenade on Themes of Czech Carols) (2004)

Concertante

- Symphony in C minor for organ and orchestra (1973)
- Proměna (Metamorphosis), Sinfonietta for violin and string orchestra (1976)
- Capriccio, Concerto for piano trio and orchestra (1986)
- Čtvero ročních dob (The Four Seasons), Symphony in A major for organ and orchestra (2001)
- Kassadandra, Symphonic Picture for English horn and orchestra (2004)
- Švandovo uvolněné odpoledne (Švanda's Leisurely Afternoon), Overture for bagpipes and orchestra (2008)

Chamber music

- String Quartet No. 1 (1972)
- String Quartet No. 2 (1973)
- Hudba pro soutěž (Competition Music) for bassoon and piano (1974)
- Kvintetiáda (Quintetiade) for woodwind quintet (1974)
- Sonata No. 1 for violin and piano (1974)
- String Quartet No. 3 (1974)
- Shakespearovské ozvěny (Shakespearean Echoes) for flute, violin, cello and piano (1974–1996)
- Piano Trio (1976)
- Furioso, Dance for oboe and piano (1977)
- Scherzo for violin and viano (1979)
- String Quartet No. 4 (1979)
- Adagio and Allegro for tuba and piano (1980)
- Sonata No. 2 for violin and piano (1980)
- Sonata No. 3 for violin and piano (1982)
- Duo for violin and cello (1983)
- Šest preludií (6 Preludes) for flute solo (1983)
- Duo for oboe and bassoon (1985)
- Sonata for cello and piano (1985)
- Trio for oboe, clarinet and bassoon (1987)
- Otisky (Impressions) for flute, bass clarinet (or cello) and piano (1988)
- Scherzo for 5 cellos (1988)
- Taneční fantasie (Dance Fantasy) for guitar quartet (1988)
- Sonata for viola and viano (1989)
- String Quartet No. 5 (1985)
- Piano Quintet (1990)
- Muzikou zní každá žilka, Polka for recorder choir (1992)
- Tři pastorale (3 Pastorales) for oboe solo (1994)
- Sonata for oboe and piano (1995)
- Idyllica (Idyllic) for oboe, clarinet and bassoon (or 3 basset horns, or 4 clarinets) (1996)
- Sextet "Hrubínovské variace" (Hrubínovský Variations) for oboe, harp and string quartet (1999)
- String Quartet No. 7 (2002)
- String Quartet No. 8 with solo soprano (2005)
- String Quartet No. 6 "Mozartův stesk" (Mozart's Nostalgia) (2006)
- Koncertantní etuda (Concertante Etudes) for oboe and piano (2006)

Keyboard

- Malá svita (Little Suite) for organ (1972)
- Tři momentky (3 Snapshots) for accordion (1973)
- Sonata for piano (1977)
- Introdukce, fuga a coda (Introduction, Fugue and Coda) for accordion (1978)
- Pražské panorama (Prague Panorama) for organ (1982)
- Portrét (Portrait), Sonata-Fantasia for organ (1986)
- Album, Cycle of Compositions for piano (1988)
- Chorální sonáta (Choral Sonata) for organ (2000)
- Variační sonáta (Variation Sonata) for organ (2003)
- Sonata No. 4 for organ (2005)

Radio operas for children

- Jaro je tu (Spring Is Here) (1975)
- Před vánocemi (Before Christmas) (1978)
- Jak přišel podzim (When Autumn Came) (1980)

Vocal

- Když zašla cesta (When the Road Ended), Song Cycle for soprano and piano (1972); words by Jan Hora
- Sonáta lásky k životu (Sonata of Love for Life) for baritone and string orchestra (1975)
- Co v sobě skrýváš (What Do You Hide), Song Cycle for baritone and piano (1976)
- V krajině vzpomínání (Landscape of Memories), Song Cycle for high voice and piano (or string orchestra) (1977, 1986); words by František Branislav
- Pijácké popěvky (Drinking Songs), Song Cycle for baritone and piano (1983)
- Aufer a nobis for voice and organ (1992)
- Alleluja for voice and organ (1996)
- Crescendo, Song Cycle for baritone and orchestra (2001)
- Haiku o Praze (Haiku of Prague), Melodrama for recitor and viola (or violin) (2007); words by Karel Trinkewitz
- Hlubina bezpečnosti, Short Cantata for soprano and piano (2007); words by John Amos Comenius
- Pouštěj chléb svůj po vodě (Cast Thy Bread upon the Waters), 5 Meditations for 2 baritones and organ (2008); Biblical text
- Bouře a klid (Storm and Calm), Melodrama for recitor, violin and orchestra (2009); words by Emmy Destinn
- To nechce klid, 5 Melodramas for recitor, flute (piccolo) and contrabassoon (2009); words by Jaroslav Hašek

Choral

- Vánoční chvalozpěv (Christmas Eulogium), Cantata for soloists, mixed chorus and orchestra (1973)
- Pohádka o smrčku (Tale of the Spruce) for children's choir, child soloists, narrator and small orchestra (1975)
- Cesta světnicí (The Way across the Room), Cantata for baritone, male chorus and orchestra (1978)
- Ukolébavka pro Martina (Lullaby for Martin) for male chamber chorus (1978)
- Tři mužské sbory s křídlovkou na Ladovy obrázky (3 Male Choruses with Bugle-horn to Lada's Pictures) (1982); words by Kamil Bednář
- Kuchyňská kapela (The Kitchen Band), Song for children's chorus (1983); words by Jan Krůta
- Ze Sci-fi zápisníku (From a Sci-fi Notebook), 3 Female Choruses (1985); words by Tomáš Janovic
- Jarní motivy (Spring Motifs), Cycle for mixed chorus a cappella (1987); words by Jan Neruda
- Vivat Komenský (Vivat Comenius), Song Cycle for children's chorus (1988); words by Václav Fischer
- Requiem for soloists, children's, men's and mixed chorus, instrumental soloists, organ and orchestra (1992)
- Missa con Viola Obligata for mixed chorus, viola solo, percussion and organ (1998)
- Žalm 67 (Psalm 67) for mixed chorus, trumpet and organ (2008)
- Zvony z Dvora králové (The Bells of Dvůr Králové), 3 Choruses with organ (2009)
