= Radim Drejsl =

Czech composer, pianist and conductor (1923–1953)

Radim Drejsl

Radim Drejsl (29 April 1923 – 20 April 1953) was a Czech composer, pianist and conductor. He is considered an important composer of politically engaged songs promoting visions of Czechoslovak communist regime in the 1950s. Drejsl applied the ideas of socialist realism in his music.

== Biography ==
Drejsl was born on 29 April 1923 in Dobruška, Czechoslovakia. Following his graduation at the gymnasium in Rychnov nad Kněžnou in 1942 he continued his studies at the Prague Conservatory. From 1942 to 1946 he studied composition with Karel Janeček and Pavel Bořkovec; and conducting as a pupil of Pavel Dědeček. Later (from 1946 to 1950) he deepened his musical skills at the Academy of Performing Arts in Prague. In 1949 he became director of the Vít Nejedlý Army Artistic Ensemble (Armádní umělecký soubor Víta Nejedlého) in Prague. He composed choruses, small cantatas and military songs for the performances of the ensemble. His composing style was partially conforming to the atmosphere and attitudes of the newly built communist state. Drejsl was one of the foremost composers of the politically engaged optimistic songs called budovatelské písně, promoting the communist ideology in the 1950s. However, he proved remarkable talent also as a composer of chamber and symphonic works.

In 1952, he visited Soviet Union and China. Among his fellow-travellers were filmmakers Vojtěch Jasný and Karel Kachyňa. In April, 1953, shortly after his return to Prague from the Soviet Union, Drejsl committed suicide. He was allegedly so disappointed by the terrible life conditions in the Soviet communist world that his enthusiastic devotion to the communist ideas was destroyed. He could not bear the disappointment, cut his veins and jumped out of a window of his flat. He died in Prague on 20 April 1953, aged 29. Film director Vojtěch Jasný questioned this version of his death, suggesting that Drejsl was murdered by KGB. According to Jasný, Drejsl planned to speak publicly about the experience from the Soviet Union, and his suicide was arranged by KGB to prevent him to do so. However, the speculations of murder were unproven.

His alleged suicide has been identified by communists as "an expression of personal weakness, cowardice, and especially the reluctance to participate in building socialism."

Drejsl, together with Vít Nejedlý and Ludvík Podéšť, is considered one of the leading exponents of integrating socialist realism into Czechoslovak music.

== Selected works ==
=== Piano ===
- Studentská předehra (Student Overture, 1940)
- Pochod Šenkýřovy hudební školy (1941)
- Polka zamilovaného dráteníka (1942/43)
- Bajky (four movements, 1943)
- Dvě polky (Two Polkas, 1943/44)
- Menuetto (1943/44)
- Tance (Dances) (1943/44)
- Šest tanečků (Six Little Dances) (1943/44)
- 1st Suite (1945)
- 2nd Suite (1946)
- Sonata (1946)

=== Chamber ===
- Maličkost (Bagatelle for string quartet and piano, 1941)
- Malá suita pro klarinet a klavír (Little Suite for clarinet and piano, 1943/44)
- Sonatina for flute and piano (1947)
- Sonatina for bassoon (1948)
- Dechový kvintet (Wind Quintet, 1948)
- Dožínková suita (The Harvest-Home Suite) for oboe (also English horn) and piano (1949/50, published 1959)

=== Orchestral ===
- Pozdě k ránu (symphonic novel for piano, harmonium and 19 instruments, publ. by K. Hlaváček, 1942)
- Symfonie pro smyčce (Symphony for Strings, 1948)
- Koncert pro klavír a orchestr (Concerto for Piano and Orchestra, 1948/49)
- Tance z Velké Kubry (Dances from Velká Kubra, 1949)
- Jánošíkovský tanec (1950)

=== Songs ===
- Česká modlitba (Czech Prayer, 1944)
- Dík za vítězný mír (1945)
- Krajiny dětství (cycle, words by František Halas, 1946)
- Čtyři pijácké písně (Chinese poetry, 1947)

=== Military songs ===
- Armádě zdar (words by Miroslav Zachata)
- Sláva tankům (words by Miroslav Kroh) for soloist, choir and orchestra
- Voják úderník (words by Miroslav Kroh, 1950) for soloist, choir and orchestra
- Písnička na vojně (words by Miroslav Kroh, 1950)
- Kandidát (1951)
- Za Gottwalda vpřed (words by Miroslav Zachata, 1951)
- Voják a sršeň
- Ve jménu Jana Žižky, Military song (In the Name of Jan Žižka, 1953); words by Miroslav Kroh
- Tankistům, March (published 1954)

=== Choruses ===
- Jarní sbory (Spring Choruses, 1948)
- Vlaj, naše vlajko (words by J. Hájek, 1948)
- Hymna STM (1949)
- Píseň o Fučíkovi (Song of Fučík, words by Miroslav Zachata, 1951) for soloist, choir and orchestra
- Píseň o Stalinovi (Song of Stalin) for soloist, chorus and piano (published 1952); words by Miroslav Kroh and Miroslav Zachata
- Píseň čs. – čínské družby for soloist, chorus and orchestra (published 1952); words by Miroslav Zachata
- Píseň kulometných čet (words by Pavel Kohout); for soloist, chorus and piano
- Země krásná (Mír musí být a bude zachován) (1952)

=== Cantatas ===
- Sláva mé zemi (words by Miroslav Zachata)
- Kantáta o vrchním veliteli (words by Stanislav Neumann, 1952)

=== Incidental music ===
- Sněm duchů na Turově (play by K. Michl, 1943)
- Russian People (for piano and 11 instruments)
- Babička (Grandmother, 1948/49)

=== Opera ===
- Jan Želivský (an unfinished opera)

=== Other ===
- Pětiletka (melodrama)
