= Milan Harašta =

Czech composer (1919–1946)

- Born: September 16, 1919; Brno, Czechoslovakia
- Died: August 29, 1946; Brno, Czechoslovakia
- Occupation: Composer
- Known for: Opera and Classical Music

Milan Harašta (September 16, 1919 – August 29, 1946) was a Czechoslovak opera and classical composer.
