= Wenzel Thomas Matiegka =

Czech composer and guitarist

Wenzel Thomas Matiegka ([macɛɪka]; Czech: Václav Tomáš Matějka; baptised 6 July 1773 – 19 January 1830) was a Czech composer and one of the most celebrated guitarists of the 19th century.

== Life ==
Wenzel Thomas Matiegka was born in Choceň in the Kingdom of Bohemia, then part of the Habsburg monarchy. Upon completion of his primary studies, he continued his musical education under Abbé Gelinek, becoming accomplished on the pianoforte while reading law at the University of Prague. After legal employment in the service of Prince Ferdinand Kinský, one of Beethoven's original sponsors, Matiegka moved to Vienna while in his late twenties, during the first years of the 19th century. There he was quickly acknowledged as a guitarist, composer and teacher of the piano.

His ready acceptance in the musical circles of Vienna was evident by those to whom he dedicated several of his chamber works. Franz Schubert, as a young man, added a cello part to Matiegka's Notturno Op. 21 (originally for flute, viola and guitar; Schubert arrangement D. 96) for the important patron of music, Count Johann Karl Esterházy (1775 – 1834), an enthusiastic cellist to whom Matiegka's original music was dedicated. Indeed the work was attributed to Schubert for many years.

Matiegka married and settled in the Vienna suburb of Leopoldstadt where he was also Kapellmeister at the St. Joseph Church from 1817 until his death. He was survived by his wife and six children, none of whom took up a musical career. His output, as it is known to this day, includes 33 guitar works including solo works, transcriptions, chamber music, and lieder as well a dozen liturgical works for small orchestra, voice and organ.

== Selected compositions ==
Guitar solo

- Zwölf leichte Ländler op. 1
- Sonatas opp. 2, 11, 16, 17, 23, 31
- 12 Pièces faciles op. 3
- Fantaisie op. 4
- Variations opp. 5, 6, 7, 8, 10, 27, 28, 29
- 12 Menuets brillantes op. 15
- 6 Pièces progressives op. 20
- transcriptions of works by Beethoven, Mozart, Zumsteeg and others

Duos

- Serenade op. 19 for violin and guitar
- Trois Sérénades concertantes op. 22 for violin and guitar
- Potpourri op. 30 for cello and guitar

Trios

- Trio op. 18 for horn, clarinet and guitar
- Notturno op. 21 for flute, viola and guitar
- Grand Trio op. 24 for violin, viola and guitar
- Notturno op. 25 for flute, viola and guitar
- Serenade op. 26 for flute, viola and guitar
