= Otakar Jeremiáš =

Czech conductor and composer (1892–1962)

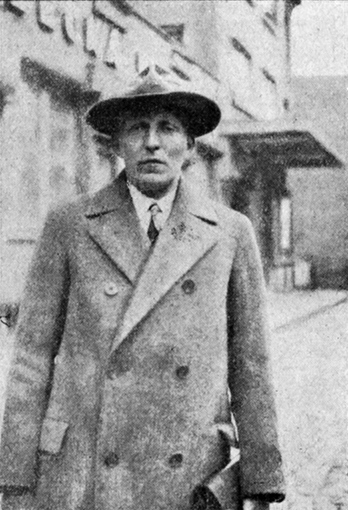
Otakar Jeremiáš, ca 1928

Otakar Jeremiáš (17 October 1892 – 5 March 1962) was a Czech composer, conductor and teacher. He was the son of composer Bohuslav Jeremiáš and the brother of composer Jaroslav Jeremiáš.

== Life ==
Jeremiáš was born in Písek. An accomplished cellist and pianist, he studied at the Prague Conservatory of Music. He lived in České Budějovice, where he directed a local music school until February 1929, when he was appointed head conductor of the Prague Radio Symphony Orchestra.

When he succeeded Charvat as conductor of the Radiojournal Orchestra in 1929, there were only 27 players, but he managed to increase its size to 45 by 1931 and by 1936 there were 70, achieved by much negotiation, good salaries for the players, as well as his own charisma.

In 1945 Jeremiáš left the Radio Symphony Orchestra to become president of the Prague National Theatre Opera. From 1949 he was chairman of the Federation of Czechoslovak Composers (Svaz československých skadatelů). He died in Prague.

Jeremiáš's view of conducting was set out in an article in 1943 where he wrote "My ideal is a creative orchestra, whose members, in accord with the efforts of the conductor, creatively collaborate during their performance".

His wife was the soprano Marie Budíková who sang Mařenka in an abridged recording of Smetana's The Bartered Bride conducted by her husband on the Esta label.

=== Composer ===
He was influenced by the works of Bedřich Smetana, Zdeněk Fibich and Leoš Janáček.

Selected works:

- Love (1921)
- Zborov (1927)
- The Brothers Karamazov (1927)
- Enšpígl – opera (finished 1949)
- The Spring Overture

=== Discography ===
Among the works recorded by Jeremiáš are a medley from The Bartered Bride (Odeon, 1929), Suk's Towards a New Life (Ultraphon, 1932), Dvořák's 16 Slavonic Dances (Ultraphon, 1940), all with the Radio Orchestra, and the New World Symphony during the war (Esta). Excerpts from Libuše with Marie Podvalová in the title role were recorded for Ultraphon in the early 1940s with forces of the Prague National Theatre.
