= Sláva Vorlová =

Czech composer (1894–1973)

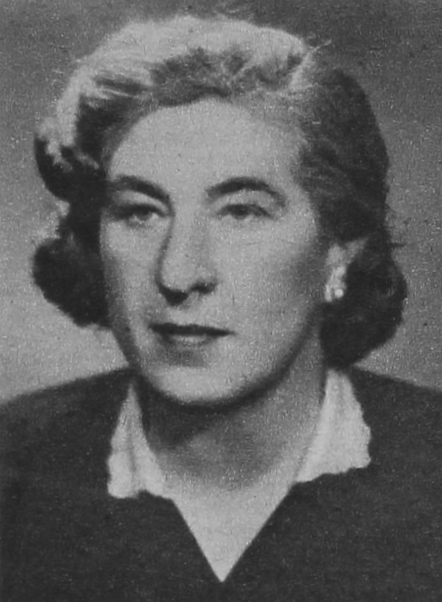
Sláva Vorlová

Sláva Vorlová (15 March 1894 – 24 August 1973) was a Czech composer. She also used the pseudonym Mira Kord.

== Biography ==
Miroslava Johnová was born in Náchod. She studied voice with Rosa Papier at the Academy of Music in Vienna, and in 1915 moved to Prague to study piano with Václav Štěpán and composition with Vítězslav Novák. In 1919, she married businessman Rudolf Vorel (whose name she adopted in its Czech form, Vorlová), and spent fifteen years in working in his business.

In 1933, she returned to composing and produced a string quartet, then continued her composition studies the next year with Jaroslav Řídký and František Maxián at the Prague Conservatory of Music. In 1945, Vorlová witnessed her husband's execution by an SS commando. She died in Prague, aged 79.

== Works ==
Vorlová composed a large number of works, including operas, orchestral pieces and jazz songs. Several of her compositions have been issued as recordings. Selected works include:

- Bezkydy for string quartet (1933)
- Three Songs, Op. 2 (1935)
- Three Songs, Op. 4 (1939)
- String Quartet No. 2, Op. 5 (1939)
- Fantasy for cello and orchestra, op. 6 (1940)
- Bílá oblaka (White Clouds), Cycle of ten songs for women's choir and orchestra, Op. 8 (1942–43)
- Maličká země (A Little Country), Op. 7 (1941–42)
- Symphony for large orchestra, Op. 18 (1948); dedicated to Jan Masaryk
- Fantasie na lidovou píseň z XV. století (Fantasy on a 15th-Century Czech Folk Song) for viola solo, Op. 33 (1953)
- Slovácký koncert (Slovak Concerto) for viola and orchestra, Op. 35 (1954)
- Concerto for bass clarinet and string orchestra, Op. 50 (1961)
- Sonáta lyrica a tre for violin, viola and guitar, Op. 62 (1964)
