= Jiří Hudec (composer) =

Czech composer, conductor, arranger and organist (1923–1996)

- Born: 31 August 1923; Brno, Czechoslovakia
- Died: 28 July 1996 (aged 72)
- Occupations: Composer, conductor and organist
- Known for: promoting Moravian and Slovak music

Jiří Hudec (31 August 1923 – 28 July 1996) was a Czech composer, conductor, arranger and organist.

== Life ==
Hudec was born in Brno, Czechoslovakia, where he studied organ at the State Conservatory under F. Michálek. In addition, he studied composing with Vilém Petrželka and conducting with Antonín Balatka. From 1944 to 1946, he also studied the piano privately under Ludvík Kundera. Later, he continued his studies of conducting at the Janáček Academy of Musical Arts. From 1953 to 1972 he was a conductor of the Symphony Orchestra of the Czech broadcasting studio Brno (BERO). From 1971 he worked as a radio director of chamber and symphonic music in Brno.

His great achievement was the promotion of the repertoire of Moravian and Slovak composers in radio broadcasts. He composed music for 15 films, and over 150 compositions for radio orchestras. The majority of his works are orchestral, but also many for concert band. His compositions are often based on folklore and songs from the Moravian region.

Hudec's eponymous son is a well-known double bass player, professor at the Prague Academy for Music, member of the Czech Philharmonic Orchestra and a Fellow of the Royal Northern College of Music.

== Selected compositions ==
Orchestral

- Drei Stilisierte Polkas im Volkston (1969)
- Ricochet-Polka. Lustige Polka (1969)
- Poetická polka (Poetic Polka) (1970)
- Malé finale (Little Finale) (1972)
- Quasi gallop (1973)
- Kaleidoskop, Overture (1979)
- Zpod Javoriny, Dance Fantasy on Moravian Themes from Kopanice (1980)
- Humoreska (1981)
- České tance (Czech Dances), Suite (1983)
  - Polka in G minor
- Koncertní valčík (Concert Waltz) (1986)
- Podzimní Meditace (Autumn Meditation) (1986)
- Tempo-tempo, Galop (1986)
- Scherzo in E (1988)
- Příhoda z léta (It Happened in Summer), Tone Picture (1989)
- Obrázky z dovolené (Pictures from Vacation), Suite for chamber orchestra
- Der Zerrspiegel

Wind orchestra

- Fox, Polka for 4 clarinets and wind orchestra (1971)
- Dupák, Czech Dance (1973)
- Pestrá paleta (A Wide Variety), Overture (1973)
- Lyrické intermezzo (Lyrical Intermezzo) (1982)
- Česká předehra (Czech Overture)
- Drei Schnapsgläser
- Moravské intermezzo (Moravian Intermezzo)

Concertante

- Triangolo: Polka-Groteske for triangle and orchestra (1969)
- Uspávanka pro Martinku (Lullaby for Martinek) for viola and orchestra (1980)
- Burleska for double bass and orchestra (1981)
- Ein Verliebter Timpanist: Polka-Groteske for timpani and orchestra

Chamber music

- 4 Duettini for oboe (or trumpet) and bassoon (or trombone) (1988)
- 4 Miniatures for wind trio
- Rapsodia per Quattro for 3 clarinets and bass clarinet (or bassoon)
