= Bohumil Fidler =

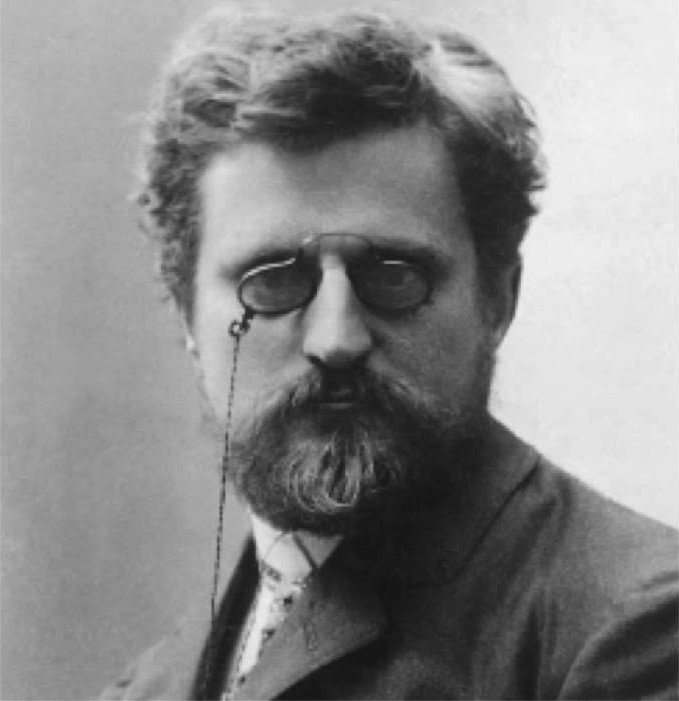
A portrait of Bohumil Fidler (1860 - 1944), Czech teacher, composer and conductor.

Bohumil Fidler (also Fiedler) (May 27, 1860 - June 2, 1944) was a Czech composer, choirmaster, choral conductor and music teacher. He was born in Příbram, where he lived and worked his entire life.

== Biography ==
Fidler was a foremost figure in the musical life of Příbram and the surrounding region. Upon completing his education, he taught at the local teachers college until 1889, and subsequently served as choir director at St. Jacob's Church. For more than 15 years Fidler was also the choirmaster of Příbram's "Lumir-Dobromila" choral association. Additionally, he founded the Příbram Philharmonic Orchestra and was its conductor from 1908-1913. He died in Příbram in 1944.

His autobiography, Můj život a vzpomínky (My Life and Memories), published in 1935, is noteworthy for its numerous recollections of his musical friendship with Czech composer Antonín Dvořák, as well as his experiences with many other lesser known Czech musicians. An annotated English translation of these memoirs has recently been published by the Dvořák Society for Czech and Slovak Music.

== Style ==
Bohumil Fidler's compositions include two Missa brevi, two Pastorale Masses, a celebratory Mass for mixed choir, soloists, orchestra and organ, and numerous smaller works for chorus as well as songs for solo voice. For the stage he wrote music for two fairy tales: Mikeš Lumidřevo and Zvířátka a Petrovští. His Slavonic Waltz was composed for the Příbram Philharmonic Orchestra; he also wrote 20 funeral marches for military band.

== Selected works ==
Church music:

- Missa solemnis in D major (1901) - performed in 1903
- Missa pastoralis II. (1937)
- Missa brevis
- Slovenská vánoční mše

He wrote also compositions for mixed choirs and works for solo voice and solo violin.
