= Jan Kapr =

Czech composer

Jan Kapr (12 March 1914, in Prague – 29 April 1988, in Prague) was one of the most prolific Czech composers of the second half of the 20th century.

== Life ==
He studied at the Prague Conservatory, as a pupil of Jaroslav Řídký, and at the master school under Jaroslav Křička. In 1939–1946 he worked as a director in the Czechoslovak Radio. Later (in 1950–1952) he was the chief-editor in the publishing house Orbis. In sixties he worked as a teacher at the Janáček's Academy in Brno. His work was also part of the music event in the art competition at the 1948 Summer Olympics.

== Sources ==
Jaroslav Smolka: Malá encyklopedie hudby. Prague: Editio Supraphon, 1983. (p. 315-316)
