= Antonín Tučapský =

Czech composer (1928–2014)

Antonín Tučapský (27 March 1928 – 9 September 2014) was a Czech composer. From 1973 until his death he lived in the United Kingdom.

== Biography ==
Tučapský was born in 1928 in Opatovice (part of Vyškov) in Czechoslovakia. In 1947 he graduated from the Teachers' Training College in Valašské Meziříčí. He studied in Brno before beginning his career as composer, teacher and conductor. From 1950 to 1951 he studied Choral Conducting at the Janáček Academy of Music and Performing Arts, Brno. In 1951 he graduated from Masaryk University, Brno, in Music Education and Musicology. Privately he studied composition with Jan Kunc, who was a pupil of Leoš Janáček. In 1951 he took up a teaching post at the Higher Music School in Kroměříž. In the same year he became a member of the well-known Moravian Teachers' Male Voice Choir and from 1964 to 1972 he was a choirmaster of that choir. In 1955 Tučapský moved to Nový Jičín, where he accepted a teaching post at the Teachers' Training College and also conducted the local mixed choir. In 1959 he moved to Ostrava and became a lecturer at the Pedagogical Faculty there. From 1961 he conducted the Children's Choir of Ostrava Radio. In 1964 he became musical director of the Moravian Teachers' Choir. With this famous body of male-voices he gave many concerts in Czechoslovakia and throughout Europe and recorded regularly for Czech Radio and the Supraphon recording company. In 1969 he gained his PhD for his book "Janacek's Male Choruses and Their Interpretation Tradition". In 1973 he moved to England and became a Professor of Composition at Trinity College of Music in London, where he remained until his retirement in 1996. In 1985 he was awarded an Honorary Fellowship of Trinity College of Music. There he had more time to develop his compositions, mostly choral or chorally based, having first performances in this country. Conversant with the various compositional theories and trends of the twentieth century, Tučapský remained essentially a tonal composer.

During his career he received various awards and prizes for his compositions and cultural activity. Masaryk University, Brno, his alma mater, bestowed on him Doctor Honoris Causa in 1996. From 1975 Tučapský devoted much of his time to composition rather than choral conducting.

His compositions have been published mostly in England, but also in the Czech Republic, Germany, France, Canada, and the United States.

Antonín Tučapský died in a hospital in Frimley on 9 September 2014, at the age of 86.

== Selected works ==
Cantata

- Mary Magdalena
- Te Deum

Choral

- Stabat Mater
- Missa Serena
- Five Lenten Motets (Pět postních motet)

Opera

- The Undertaker

Concertante

- Concerto for viola and orchestra (1996)

Chamber music

- Duo Concertante for viola and guitar (1989)
- Sonata for viola and piano (2002)
