= František Doubravský =

Czech composer, choirmaster and organist

František Doubravský (7 February 1790, Lomnice nad Popelkou – 28 April 1867, Lomnice nad Popelkou) was a Czech composer, choirmaster and organist.

Františrk Doubravský was a prolific composer of Neoclassical era. The list of works contains ten basic groups, from which the most number represent composition of sacred music, above all masses.

- Masses (73)
- Salve Regina, Alma, Ave Regina, Regina coeli, Rorate, Stabat Mater apod. (50)
- Graduale, Arias (44)
- Litanie, Vesperae, Invitatoria aj. (33)
- Veni sancte Spiritus
- Te Deum laudamus apod. (23)
- Stationes etc. (17)
- Requiem (13)
- Offertoria (10).
- Secular works (20): symphonies, concerto for violin and orchestra, nocturnes, duets, quartets, serenades and dances (polkas)
