= Frantisek Kotzwara =

Czech composer and violist

František Kočvara, known later in England as Frantisek Kotzwara (1730 – September 2, 1791), was a Czech violist, virtuoso double bassist and composer.

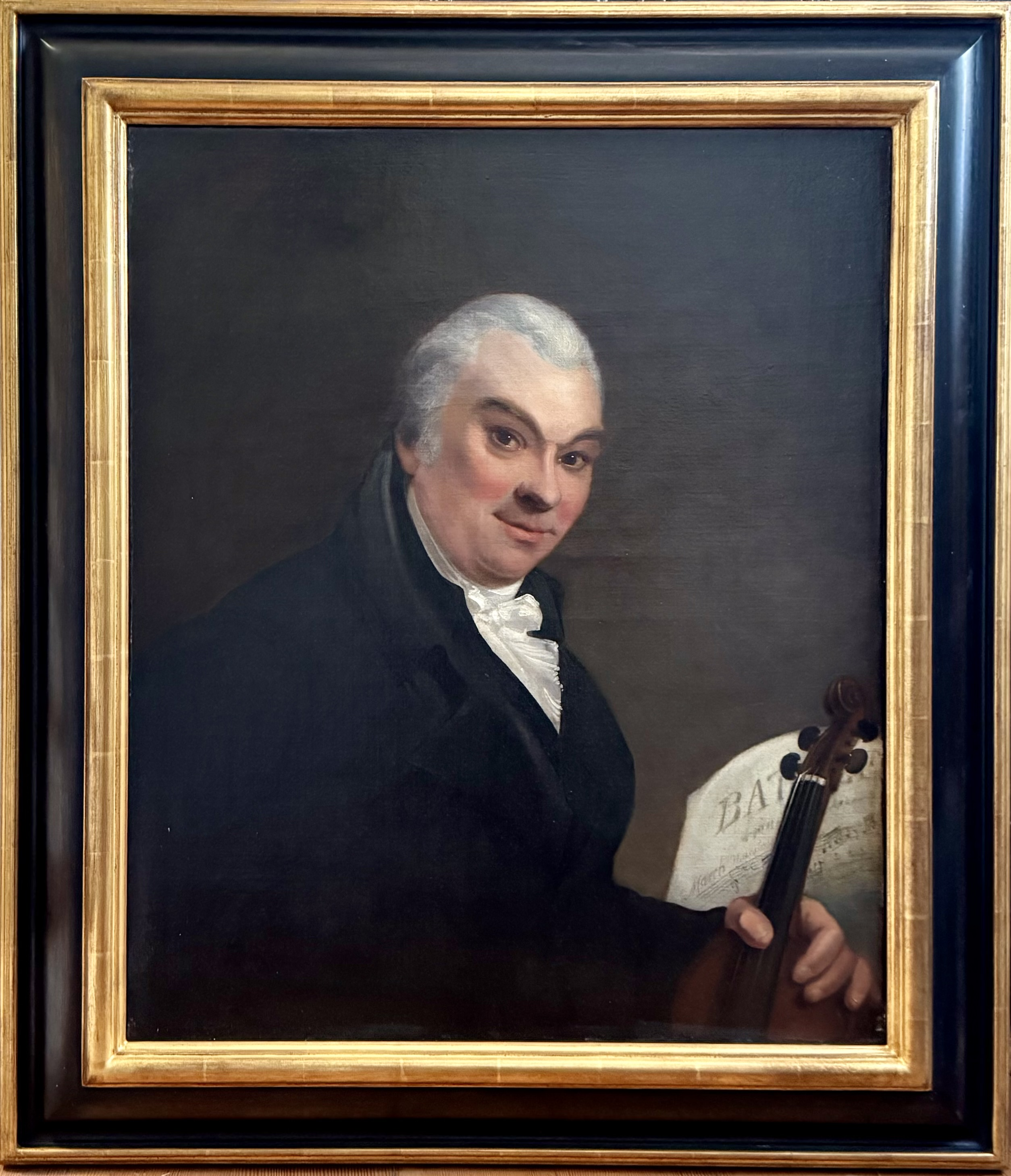
Portrait of Frantisek Kotzwara

His death was one of the first recorded instances of death by erotic asphyxiation.

== Life and music ==
Kotzwara was born in Prague, Bohemia, and was something of a nomad. He travelled around Europe and performed with various orchestras. His mature career was based in England, where his compositions were published from 1775 onwards. These include string quartets, serenades and string trios. In London he played in the Concerts of Antient Music, in the Handel Commemoration of 1791 and in the orchestra of the King's Theatre.

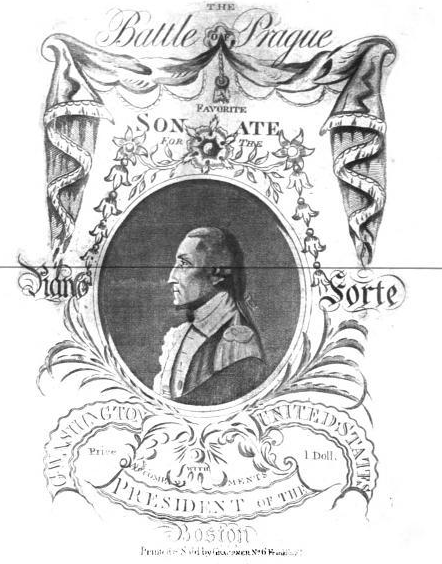
Cover of The Battle of Prague (Boston: Gottlieb Graupner, early 19th century)

The only piece of his to have achieved renown is The Battle of Prague, a composition based on the 1757 Battle of Prague, in which the Kingdom of Prussia fought the Habsburg monarchy. The Battle of Prague was a popular piece of music during the late 18th and 19th centuries, with Mark Twain mentioning the piece in his books Adventures of Huckleberry Finn, A Tramp Abroad and Life on the Mississippi, W. M. Thackeray in Vanity Fair, and Thomas Hardy in A Pair of Blue Eyes. A similar piece, The Siege of Quebec, often attributed to Kotzwara, is probably an arrangement by Willem de Krifft using assorted materials of Kotzwara.

== Death ==
On September 2, 1791, while he was in London, Kotzwara visited a prostitute named Susannah Hill in Vine Street, Westminster. After dinner with her in her lodgings, Kotzwara paid her two shillings and requested that she cut off his testicles. Hill refused to do so. Kotzwara then tied a ligature around the doorknob, the other end fastened around his neck, and proceeded to have sexual intercourse with Hill. After it was over, Kotzwara was dead. His death is one of the first recorded deaths from erotic asphyxiation.

Susannah Hill was charged with Kotzwara's murder, and tried on September 16 at the Old Bailey. She was acquitted, as the jury accepted her testimony about the nature of Kotzwara's death. The court records of the case were supposedly destroyed in order to avoid a public scandal, though it is likely that some kind of copy was made. It is believed that this copy was used to produce a pamphlet about the incident, including Hill's account of the event. A 2005 radio competition organised by the Radio Prague station led a listener to reveal that these court records had in fact not been destroyed, and somehow found their way to the Francis Countway Library of Medicine in Boston.

This case was briefly featured in the UK TV series Garrow's Law.

In 1984 a paper about Kotzwara's death was published in the American Journal of Forensic Medicine and Pathology, entitled "The sticky end of Frantisek Koczwara, composer of The Battle of Prague". A pamphlet, Modern Propensities, with details of the trial and an article about auto-erotic asphyxiation was published in London about 1797.

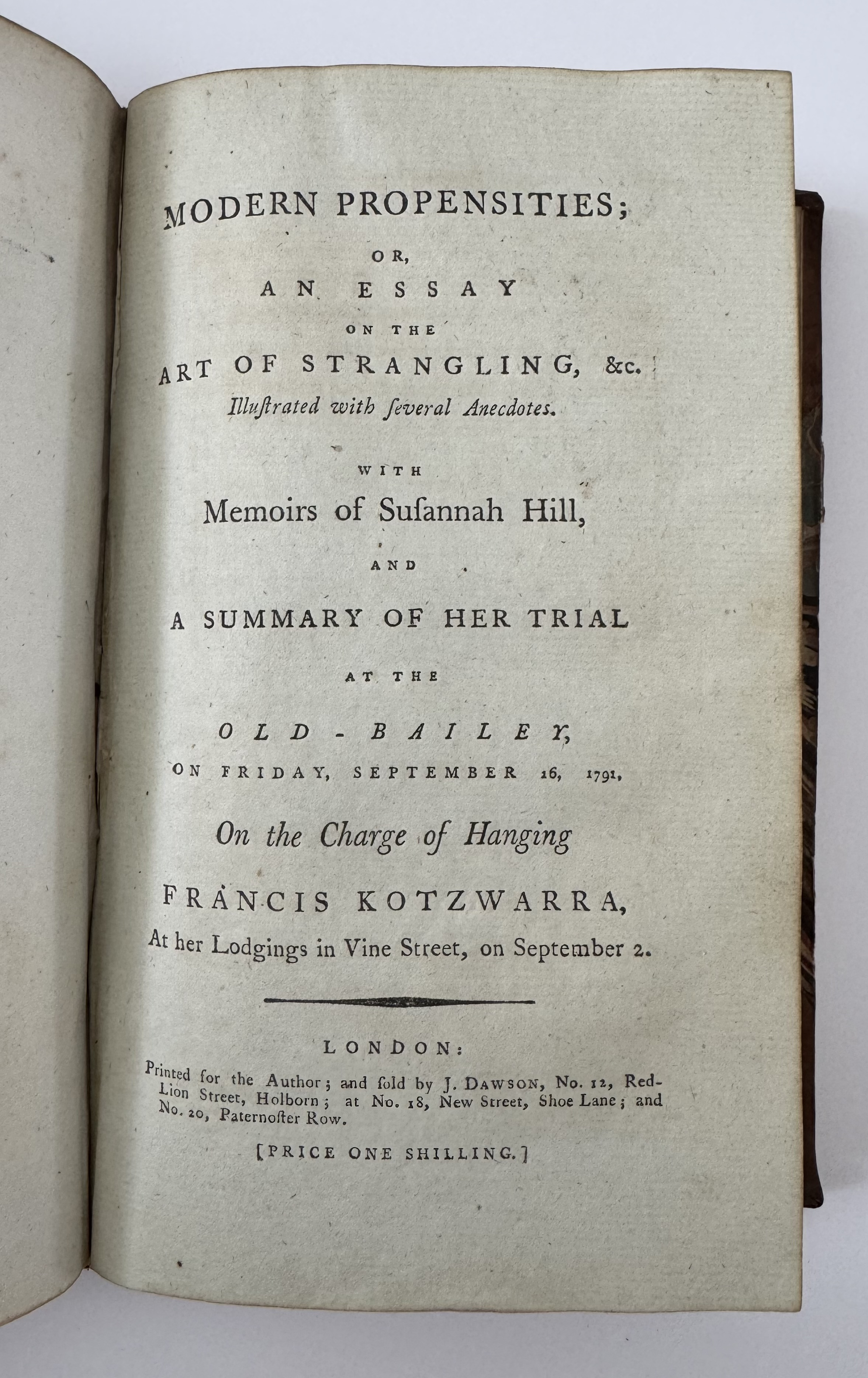
Modern Propensities, title page.

== Works ==
- 6 Songs (published 1775, London)
- 3 Serenades for violin, viola, cello and 2 horns, Op. 1 (published ca.1775, Amsterdam)
- 3 Sonatas for viola with basso continuo, Op. 1 (published by W.N. Haueisen, Frankfurt am Main ca.1780)
- 4 Sonatas for viola with basso continuo, Op. 2 (published by Bonvin, Paris 1787)
- 6 Trio Sonatas (published 1777?, London):
  - Sonata I in E♭ major for 2 violins with basso continuo
  - Sonata II in G minor for flute and violin (or 2 violins) with basso continuo
  - Sonata III in D major for flute and violin (or 2 violins) with basso continuo
  - Sonata IV in C major for flute and violin (or 2 violins) with basso continuo
  - Sonata V in F major for 2 violins with basso continuo
  - Sonata VI in C major for 2 violas with basso continuo
- 6 Trio Sonatas for 2 violin with basso continuo (2 horns ad lib.), Op. 5 (published 1778)
- The Battle of Prague, Sonata in F major for pianoforte with accompaniments for violin, cello and drum, Op. 23 (published by J. Lee ca.1788)
- 3 Sonatas for the harpsichord or pianoforte with accompaniment for violin, Op. 34 (published ca.1791)

== Notes ==
1. Some sources give Kotzwara's year of birth as 1750 or 1740.
2. Some sources give Kotzwara's year of death as 1793.
3. Grove Dictionary of Music & Musicians 1980, gives the date of death as 2 September 1791, with the date of the subsequent trial of Susan Hill [sic?] on 16 September 1791.

== Bibliography ==
- Modern propensities, or, An essay on the art of strangling, &c.: illustrated with several anecdotes: with memoirs of Susannah Hill, and a summary of her trial at the Old-Bailey, on Friday, September 16, 1791, on the charge of hanging Francis Kotzwarra, at her lodgings in Vine Street, on September 2. London: printed for the author and sold by J. Dawson, [1791?]
- Grove's Dictionary of Music and Musicians
