= František Brož =

Czech violist and music educator (1896–1962)

František Brož (10 April 1896 – 21 July 1962) was a Czech violist, composer, conductor and music educator.

== Biography ==
Brož was born on 10 April 1896 in Prague. He studied violin at the Prague Conservatory with Jindřich Baštař. He later studied composition with Josef Bohuslav Foerster and Vítězslav Novák, and conducting under Otakar Ostrčil and Václav Talich. He played viola in the Czech Philharmonic as well as orchestras in Vienna and Istanbul, and was choirmaster of various choral societies in Prague.

For several years Brož was active in Hranice in Moravia conducting the symphony orchestra and choir. He returned to Prague in 1940 where he taught music and conducted the Studio Opera Company. From 1945, Brož taught music theory at the Prague Conservatory, and was also a lecturer at the Academy of Performing Arts in Prague from 1947 to 1950.

Brož's compositions include a ballet, music for orchestra, chamber music, as well as songs and choral works. In 1948 he published a book on basso continuo and figured bass musical notation.

Brož died on 21 July 1962 in Prague.

== Selected works ==
Stage

- Pokušení sv. Antonína (The Temptation of St. Anthony), Ballet-Pantomime, Op. 7 (1934, première in Ostrava 1937)

Orchestral

- Bohatýnská tryzna, Preludium a dvojitá fuga (In Commemoration of Heroes), Prelude and Double-fugue, Op. 23 (1954)
- Orchestrální variace (Orchestral Variations), Op. 7
- Orchestrální suita (Orchestral Suite), Op. 10 (1937)
- Petr Vok, Symphonic Poem
- Sinfonia, Op. 22 (1953)

Concertante

- Chromatické variace (Chromatic Variations) for accordion and orchestra (1956)

Chamber music

- Sonata for violin and piano, Op. 1 (1923)
- String Quartet No. 1 in F minor, Op. 6 (1928)
- Woodwind Quintet, Op. 15 (1944)
- Suite for violin, Op. 17 (1945)
- Jarní sonáta (Spring Sonata) for viola and piano, Op.18 (1946)
- Sonata for cello and piano, Op. 25 (1957)
- String Quartet No. 2 (1960)
- Piano Trio for violin, cello and piano
- Preludium a variace (Prelude and Variations) for violin solo

Organ

- Fantasie a fuga (Fantasy and Fugue), Op. 20 (1948)

Piano

- Prostá hudba (Plain Music), Op. 4 (1925)
- Tři capriccia (3 Capriccios), Op. 12 (1936)

Vocal

- Lidové pisně s průvodem klavíru (Folk Songs with Piano Accompaniment) (1961)
- Boží zahrada (God's Garden), Cycle of 4 Songs for voice and piano
- The Skylark for coloratura soprano and orchestra

Choral

- Vigilie (The Vigils), Cantata da camera for chorus and orchestra, Op. 5 (1928); words by Otokar Březina
- Tři milostné písně (3 Love Songs), Op. 16
- Tři písně (3 Songs) for children's chorus, 3 violins and piano

Literature

- Generálbas a continuo (Generalbass and Continuo) (1948)
