= Jan Ignác František Vojta =

Czech Baroque composer and doctor of medicine

Jan Ignác František Vojta was a Czech composer (*1657 - 12 May 1701) of Baroque music and a doctor of medicine.

Apart from notes in the university records, written in his own hand, we have no other primary source information about him. He lived in the Týn quarter in Old Town of Prague. In his day, he was a recognized composer with his own pupils. There is a knowledge only of 27 of his compositions, of which only seven survive – in Brno, Prague, Vienna, and Paris (in the “Codex Rost”).
