= Jaroslav Krček =

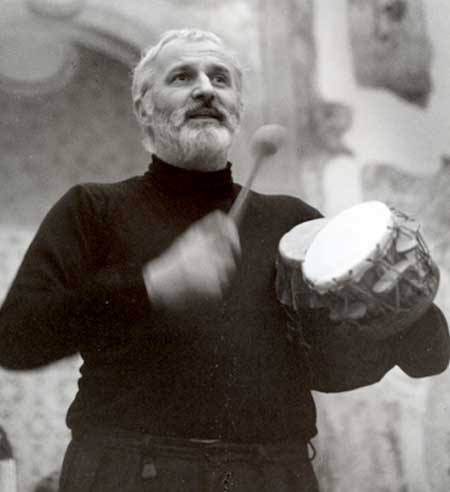
Jaroslav Krček, late 1970s

Jaroslav Krček (born 22 April 1939) is a Czech radio producer, conductor, inventor of musical instruments and composer of classical and folk music.

== Biography ==
Jaroslav Krček was born in Čtyři Dvory, today a part of České Budějovice in South Bohemian Region. He studied at the B. Jeremiáš School of Music in České Budějovice before studying composition with Miloslav Kabeláč and conducting with Bohumír Liška, both at Prague Conservatory.

Krček was the musical director for Plzeň Radio and the music editor for the recording company Supraphon. He is the artistic leader and performer in the folklore group Chorea Bohemica (founded 1967), for which he has composed and adapted a number of songs and dances. Musica Bohemica, a chamber ensemble specialising in Czech (Bohemian) Christmas songs, was created in 1975 by Krček as an offspring of Chorea Bohemica. Some of Krček's music is inspired by early Czech music, medieval and Renaissance songs, 16th century hymn books and baroque music. Also interested in folk music of the 18th and 19th centuries, Krček has arranged several hundred folksongs and folk dances. He has done extensive and systematic individual, creative work in the realisation of folklore and anonymous musical works. Krček has recorded more than fifty albums of his own compositions and folk songs.

== Raab: an electronic opera ==
Raab (aka Raab The Harlot) or Nevěstka Raab (The Prostitute Raab) is one of Krček's most renowned compositions. It was created in the Prague Electronic Music Studio in 1970–71. It is described as an electronic opera. It was banned by the communist regime in 1972, and it was never staged in Czechoslovakia until the Velvet Revolution of 1989.

Plot

The story of Raab (Rahab in English, Rachav in Hebrew) is based on the account of the Fall of Jericho as told in the Book of Joshua. A Jewish king was planning to conquer the town: Joshua son of Nun sent two spies out from Shittim secretly and instructed them: “Find out what you can about the land, especially Jericho. They stopped at the house of a prostitute named Rahab and spent the night there [Joshua 2:1]. Rahab helps the two spies and hides them from the King of Jericho's guards, thus helping the Israelites conquer Jericho. The libretto is by Zdeněk Barborka using an invented language approximating Aramaic, the vernacular language of the Jews during most of the Biblical era. The opera opens with an introductory recitation in Czech, followed by one of several long instrumental crescendos built from slow trumpet calls and cymbal crashes, reaching a climax before a long decaying low-pitched rumble: an allusion to the trumpets used by Joshua during the seven-day siege of Jericho. The opera relies mostly on vocals with occasional electroacoustic interjections in the form of processed acoustic instruments like viola, tam-tam or full orchestra, transformed through studio treatment and montage. Vocal deliveries are diverse, ranging from singing to sprechgesang, from the plaintive to the exalted, from emphatic to hushed voices. The cast included core members of the Chorea Bohemica ensemble, from which the Musica Bohemica ensemble was derived, founded by Krček in 1975.

A new production of Nevěstka Raab was staged in 2003 at Janáček Academy of Music and Performing Arts (JAMU) in Brno, with costume and stage design by Radka Mizerová (born 1976). Another production was presented in 2004, by stage director Magdalena Krčková (born 1977) at Jičín's Cultural House (Kulturní dům v Jičíně). This performance included dancers as well as actors and singers.

== Selected works ==
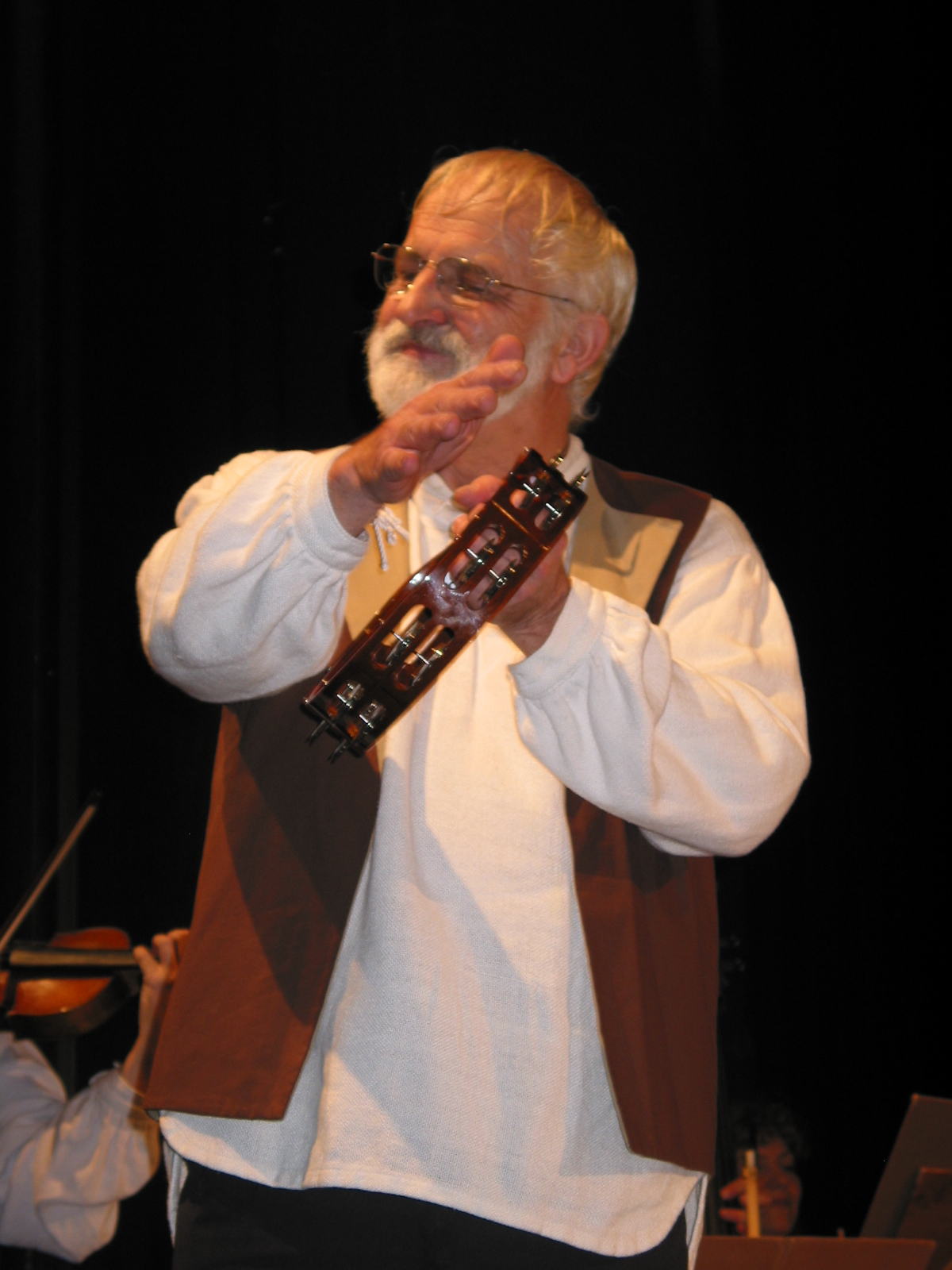
Czech composer Jaroslav Krček

- Vocal and chamber compositions: Variations For Orchestra, 1967
- Musique concrete: Sonaty Slavičkove (Nightingale Sonatas), 1971
- Opera: Nevěstka Raab, 1971; Bread out of Stones [date]
- Symphony N°1, 1975
- Dialogues With Time, a concert for 2 voices and magnetic tape, 1979
- Chamber Suita Semplice, 1979
- Concerto For Violin And Orchestra, 1980
- Concerto For Oboe, harp and Chamber Orchestra, 1981
- Orchestral suite: Ad Radices, 1982
- Symphony Nº2 for Chorus & Chamber Orchestra, 1983. Chamber music version, 1985
- Testamenti – Vocal and Instrumental Suite to Words of Ancient Phrases, 1984
- Three Love Songs, 1986
- Four Renaissance Miniatures commissioned by Trio Spektrum
- Musica per Musica Bohemica, for chamber ensemble, 1990
- Symphony No 4 'Desidearata', premiered at the Prague Premieres 2005
- Symphony No 5 'Renaissance', 2010

== Film music ==
- Škaredá dedina (1975)
- Plaché příběhy (1982).... 2. Vražedný útok,3. Modrá chryzantéma
- Poslední propadne peklu (1982)
- Všichni mají talent (1984)
- Moře začíná za vsí (1987)
- Tichý společník (1988)
