= Jiří Teml =

Czech composer and radio producer (born 1935)

- Born: 24 June 1935 (age 91); Vimperk
- Occupations: Composer, Radio producer

Jiří Teml (born 24 June 1935) is a Czech composer and radio producer.

Born in Vimperk, Teml studied music theory and composition with Bohumil Dušek and Jiří Jaroch during the 1960s and early 1970s while working as an economist. His first major success as a composer came with his Fantasia appassionata for organ which took third prize at the 1972 Prague Spring Festival. In 1976, he became the head of music and a radio producer at Plzeň Radio. He left in 1980 to join the staff of Czech Radio 3 in Prague, where he worked as a producer of programs of classical music for over 20 years.

A prolific composer, Teml's output includes several symphonies, concertos, song cycles, choral works, children's operas, chamber music, art songs, and works for solo organ and piano. His writing displays an influence of Czech folk music and for many years, he has collaborated with the Plzeň Radio folk ensemble.

== Selected works ==
Orchestral

- Suita giocosa for chamber orchestra (1973)
- Symphony No.1 "Lidé a prameny" ("People and Sources") for string orchestra, harp and timpani (1976, revised 1999)
- Tři promenády (3 Promenades) (1983)
- Concerto Grosso "Pocta Händlovi" ("Hommage à Händel") for chamber orchestra (1984)
- Symphony No.2 "Válka s mloky" ("War with the Newts") (1987)
- Capriccia (Capriccios) for chamber orchestra (1989)
- Jubilejní variace – Symfonická věta k poctě B. Martinů (Anniversary Variations – Hommage à Bohuslav Martinů), Symphonic Movement (1989)
- Písecké divertimento for chamber orchestra (1989)
- Epitaph, Symphonic Movement for string orchestra and percussion (1991)
- Omaggi – Festive Music for Pilsen for chamber orchestra (1994)
- Legenda "Zakladatelé kláštera v Disentis" (Legend: The Founders of the Monastery in Disentis) for string orchestra, harp and percussion (1996)
- Symphony No.3 "Kafka" in One Movement (1998)
- Enigma vitae "Hommage à Leoš Janáček" (2003)

Concertante

- Fantasie for clarinet and chamber orchestra (1969)
- Toccata for violin and orchestra (1974)
- Concerto for violin and orchestra (1978–1979)
- Concertino for cello, string orchestra, piano and percussion (1979)
- Fantasie-Concerto for violin, harp and orchestra (1983)
- Concerto No.1 for organ with string orchestra, trumpets and percussion (1985)
- Concertino "Hommage à Vivaldi" for oboe and chamber orchestra (1993)
- Concerto No.2 for organ with brass and percussion (1994)
- Concerto Grosso No.2 for two violins, cello and string orchestra (2001)
- Concerto Grosso No.3 for flute, bassoon and string orchestra (2002)
- Concerto Rustico for hammered dulcimer and string orchestra (2004)
- Double Concerto "Zwei Schattensteine" for 2 clarinets and orchestra (2007)
- Concerto for harpsichord and chamber orchestra (2008)

Chamber music

- String Quartet No.1 (1970)
- Balletto per due, 2 Suite of Short Pieces for oboe and bassoon (1971)
- Komorní hudba (Chamber Music) for oboe and piano (1971)
- Miniatures, 6 Compositions for accordion (1972)
- Pět kusů (Five Pieces) for clarinet solo (1973)
- Šest houslových duet (6 Violin Duets) (1973, revised 1978)
- Divertimento for violin, cello and piano (1974)
- Čtyři malé studie (4 Little Studies) for violin, guitar and accordion (1975)
- Maňáskové divadlo (Puppet Theatre) for nonet (1976)
- Tři bagately (3 Bagatelles) for oboe, clarinet (bass clarinet), violin and piano (1977)
- Čtyři invence (Four Inventions) for violin and guitar (1977)
- Dramatické scény (Dramatic Scenes) for trumpet and piano (1978)
- Tři kusy (3 Pieces) "Vivat Stravinskij", String Quartet No.2 (1978, revised 1986)
- Wind Quintet No.2 (1978)
- Dřevěná muzika (Wooden Music) for soprano recorder, violin and percussion (1980)
- Kolokvia (Colloquys), 5 Short Pieces for oboe, clarinet and bassoon (1980)
- Monolog (Monologue) for viola solo (1981)
- Trittico for cornet and organ (1981)
- Teatro piccolo for bassoon and piano (1982)
- Obelisk (Obelisque), Concert Fantasia for violin and piano (1983)
- Triptych for horn and organ (1983)
- Klarinetový špalíček (Clarinet Song-Book), 6 Easy Pieces for 2 clarinets
- Kaligramy (Caligrams), 7 compositions for harp (1984)
- Mozaika (Mosaic), Concertant Music for violin and piano (1985)
- Pantomima for flute and piano (1987)
- Rituál for flute, bass clarinet and piano (1988)
- String Quartet No.3 "Fantastické scény" ("Fantastic Scenes") (1988)
- Rozmarné léto (Capricious Summer), Musical Joke for flute, oboe, clarinet, horn, bassoon, violin, viola, cello and double bass (1989)
- Meditace a rozkoše (Meditation and Delights), 2 Movements for viola and harpsichord after Jan Zrzavý (1990)
- Shakespearovské motivy (Shakespearian Motifs) for flute, violin, cello and harpsichord (1990)
- Příběh s happyendem (A Story with a Happy End) for flute and harp (1991)
- Tři skladby (3 Compositions) for organ and percussion (1991)
- Trio gaio for oboe, clarinet and bassoon (1991)
- Hommage à Simenon for bass clarinet and piano (1993)
- Kaleidoskop (Kaleidoscope), Concert Music for violin and piano (1993)
- Pidluke, padluke, Sextet for flute, oboe, clarinet, bass clarinet, horn and bassoon (1995)
- Reliéf, Capriccio for violin and piano (1995)
- String Quartet No.4 "Divertimento" (1996)
- Dvě invence (2 Inventions) for nonet and percussion (1996)
- Metamorfózy (Metamorphoses) for flute, clarinet, piano, double bass and percussion (1998)
- Partita for violin solo (1998)
- Dvě folklórní studie (2 Folklore Studies) for flute, viola and harp (1999)
- Hommage à Michelangelo for organ, brass quintet and percussion (ad libitum) (2000)
- Dva obrázky z Bertramky (Two Pictures from Bertramka) for violin, cello and piano (2000)
- Taneční suita (Dance Suite) for 2 saxophones, 2 horns, double bass and percussion (2000)
- David a Goliáš (David and Goliath) for flute and organ (2001)
- Partita for flute, violin, cello and piano (2001)
- Divertimento for violin and viola (2002)
- Divertimento Rustico for 3 clarinets and bass clarinet (2002)
- Čtyři miniatury (4 Miniature) for string trio (2003)
- Epigramy (Epigrams) for flute, violin and piano (2003)
- Čtyři nálady (4 Moods) for violin and cello (2004)
- Cesta ke světlu (Journey to the Light) for 2 violins (2004)
- Hudba k vernisáži for 2 violins (2005)
- Karlovarské obrázky for flute and piano (2005)
- Malá galerie (A Little Gallerie) for accordion and cello (2005)
- Strnadela for flute, violin and piano (2005)
- Krumlovské maškary (The Krumlov Masks), Suite for transverse flute (or recorder) and harpsichord (2006)
- Přišla k nám radostná novina (To Us Glad Tidings: Christmas Songs and Carols) for 2 violins (2006)
- Půjdem spolu do Betléma (Let's Go To Bethlehem), Christmas Carols for cello and percussion (2006)
- Fantazie a rondo (Fantasy and Rondo) for oboe and violin (2006)
- Komorní hudba (Chamber Music) for viola and piano (2007)
- Šumavské variace (Šumava Variations) for 2 violins, viola, cello and double bass (2007)
- Čtvero denních dob aneb Vivaldi v Čechách (The Four Times of Day or Vivaldi in Bohemia) for 2 violins (2008)
- Mozartovská křižovatka (Mozartian Junction) for 2 violins

Harpsichord

- Commedia dell'arte (1987)
- Diptych (1998)
- Pět tanců (5 Dances) (2004)

Organ

- Fantasia Appassionata (1972)
- Tři ritornely (3 Ritornellos) (1977)
- Alchymisté (Alchymists), 6 compositions (1984)
- Responsoria (Responsorios) (1992)
- Rapsodie (1996)
- Concertino for organ (or harpsichord) and wind quintet (2003)
- Mysterium sacrum (2005)
- Fantasietta – Hommage à Buxtehude (2007)

Piano

- Hudbička (A Little Music), Pieces for children (1971)
- Pět malých etud (5 Little Etudes) (1978)
- Čtyři věty (4 Movements) (1997)

Reciter

- Zelená flétna (The Green Flute), Melodrama on Verses of Miroslav Florian for reciter, flute, viola and harp (1983)
- Halasení, Melodrama for reciter and piano (2000); poetry by František Halas
- Divadlo svět (Theater World), Melodrama on text of William Shakespeare for reciter and harpsichord (2002)
- Lásko (Love!), Melodrama for reciter, flute and viola (2005)

Vocal

- Jízda na luční kobylce, 5 Songs for baritone and piano (1983); words by Miroslav Florian
- Cigánské melodie (Gypsy Melodies) for baritone and orchestra (1992)
- Elckerlijc-Mariken van Nieumeghen, Cantata-Miracle for alto, tenor, baritone, reciter, chamber ensemble and organ (1993)
- Sonety (Sonnets), Song Cycle for baritone and chamber orchestra (1997); words by William Shakespeare
- Sapientia I., Songs on Latin texts for baritone and piano (or organ) (2001)
- Sapientia II., Song Cycle on Latin texts for baritone and piano (or organ) (2002)
- Ave Maria for soprano, clarinet and piano (or organ), or for children's chorus and organ (2005)
- Sapientia III., Song Cycle on Latin texts for mezzo-soprano and harp (2005)
- Moudrého Katona mravní poučování for mezzo-soprano and harpsichord (2007)

Choral

- Tři žertovné madrigaly (3 Jocose Madrigals) for soprano, alto and female chorus (1973)
- Ach ta vojna, vojna, Cycle on folk texts for mixed chorus and piano (1975)
- Tři písničky pod pantoflem (Wearing the Breeches) on words from Moravian folk poetry for mixed chorus a cappella (1980)
- Opavské písničky (Songs from Opava) for girl's (or woman's) chorus and piano (1981)
- Šest písniček ze studánky (6 Songs from the Well) on Czech folk poetry for girl's (or woman's) chorus, violin and percussion (1981)
- Čtyři moravské písničky (4 Moravian Songs) on Moravian folk poetry for girl's (or women's) chorus and flute (1982)
- Vodní muzika (Water Music), Cantata for baritone, children's chorus, flute, viola, harp and percussion (1983); text by Vladimír Šefl
- Tři negalantní kuplety (Three Uncivil Cabaret Songs) for male chorus a cappella (1985); words by Jiří Žáček, Václav Hons and Jiří Chum
- Den přeslavný jestr k nám přišel for soloists, mixed chorus, brass quintet, organ and percussion (1991)
- Nová píseň o velké povodni v Sušici (A New Song about the Great Flood in Sušice), Cantata for baritone, mixed chorus, viola, clarinet and percussion (1993)
- Ave for mixed chorus a cappella (1997)
- Credo, Cycle for baritone and mixed chorus a cappella (1998); words by Jan Tůma
- Laudetur Jesus Christus for mixed chorus a cappella (2000)
- Dva svatobné for male chorus a cappella to Slovak folk poetry (2003)
- Missa piccola for mixed chorus and violin (2004)
- Sapientia IV., Settings on Latin texts for mixed chorus a cappella (2006)
- Hohes Lied for mixed chorus a cappella (2007)
- Vonička, Cycle of mixed choruses to folk poetry (2007)

Music for children

- Pětilístek, Children's choruses with piano accompaniment on texts by Czech authors (1972)
- Všelijaké písničky (Various Songs) for children's chorus and piano on texts by Czech authors (1975)
- Škola (School), Micro-Cantata for soloists, children's chorus and piano (1975); text by Jaroslav Cyrus
- Sluníčko (Little Sun), Song Collection for pre-school children (1976)
- Písničky z trávy (Songs from the Grass) for children's (or girl's) chorus and violin solo (1976)
- Ptačí rozhlásek (The Bird's Little Radio), Cantata for child soloist, children's chorus and small instrumental ensemble (1980); words by Václav Fischer
- Cirkus Rámus (Circus Racket), 3 Songs for children's chorus and piano (1984)
- Kolotoč (Carousel), 4 Songs for children's chorus and piano (1986); words by Václav Fischer
- Splnilo se Písmo svaté, Christmas Songs and Carols for children's chorus, chamber orchestra and organ (1991)
- Žalm 136 (Psalm 136) for children's chorus and string orchestra (or string quartet) (1999)
- Svatá noc (Holy Night), Christmas Songs and Carols for children's chorus, orchestra and organ (2001)

Children's opera

- Císařovy nové šaty (The Emperor's New Clothes) (2006); libretto by Jan Tůma after the story by Hans Christian Andersen
- Kocour v botách (The Tom-Cat in Boots) for soloists, chorus and chamber orchestra (2008); libretto by Jan Tůma and Eliška Hrubá

== Sources ==
- Karel Steinmetz. "Teml, Jiří", The New Grove Dictionary of Music and Musicians, 2001.
- Biography of Jiří Teml at www.musica.cz
