= Klement Slavický =

Czech composer

Klement Slavický

Klement Slavický (22 September 1910 – 4 September 1999) was a Czech composer of modern classical music.

== Biography ==
Slavický was born on 22 September 1910 in Tovačov, Moravia, Austria-Hungary. He studied under Karel Boleslav Jirák and Josef Suk. He was inspired by Moravian folk music and the works of Leoš Janáček. The best-known of his works are the double chorus Lidice, Rapsodické variace pro orchestr (Rhapsodic Variations for Orchestra), the sonata Přátelství (Friendship) for violin and piano, the dramatic fresco Cesta ke světlu (The Way Toward the Light), the brilliant Toccata from the cycle Three pieces for piano (1947) and Symfonietta IV, Pax hominibus in universo orbi, which was dedicated by Slavický to the United Nations for the 40th anniversary of its birth. There is also a song-cycle Oh, My Heart So Wretched, which sets five Slovak folk poems and which has recently (2010) been recorded by the soprano Marie Fajtová. The 12 Small Studies for Piano have been recorded in 2016 by the slovak pianist Zuzana Zamborská (Diskant, DK 0164-2131).

Slavický died on 4 September 1999 in Prague, at the age of 88.

== Selected works ==
- Moravian Dance Fantasias for orchestra (1951)
- Rhapsodic Variations for orchestra (1953)
- Rapsodie for Solo Viola (1987)
- Ej, srdenko moje (Oh, My Heart So Wretched) song cycle
  1. Nad Strážniců jasno (Here the Sky is Sunny)
  2. Šohajku s modrýma očima (Sky-blue Eyes)
  3. Těžko temu kamenovi (Heavy is that Weighty Boulder)
  4. Pověz mi, má milá (Tell Me, My Bonnie Lass)
  5. Studená rosenka (There was a Chilly Dew)
  6. Byla jsem ešče malá (I was Small Then and Gawky)
