= Theodor Schaefer =

Czech composer and pedagogue

Theodor Schaefer (23 January 1904 – 19 March 1969) was a Czech composer and pedagogue.

== Life ==
Theodor Schaefer was born in Telč, Moravia, Austria-Hungary on 23 January 1904. During 1922–1926, he studied composition with Jaroslav Kvapil and conducting with František Neumann at the Brno Conservatory. He continued his music education at the Prague Conservatory where he studied composition under Vítězslav Novák (1926–1929). During 1930–1934, he taught at the Municipal Music School in Kutná Hora. In 1934, Schaefer moved to Brno where he taught composition and music theory, first at the private music school of Václav Kaprál (1934–1940) and later at the Brno Conservatory (1940–1959). In 1959, Schaefer became a professor of composition at the Janáček Academy of Music in Brno. For several years he also conducted Brněnské orchestrální sdružení and Brno Radiojournal Ensemble. During 1960s he served as chair of the Union of Czechoslovak Composers (Brno branch) and was instrumental in founding the Brno International Music Festival. Theodor Schaefer died on 19 March 1969 in Brno.

== Selected works ==
Stage

- Švanda dudák (Švanda the Bagpiper), Children's Opera (1925); libretto by F. Tomek
- Honza dobrák, Children's Opera (1923); libretto by F. Tomek
- Mauglí (Mowgli), Incidental Music to the play by Rudyard Kipling for piano (1932)
- Legenda o štěstí (Legend of Happiness), Ballet, Op. 23 (1950–1953)

Orchestral

- Tři české tance ve starém slohu (3 Czech Dances in Olden Style) (1930)
- Scherzo Piccolo, Op. 9 (1937)
- Valašská serenáda (Wallachian Serenade), Symphonic Poem, Op. 12 (1939)
- Janošík, Ballad-Overture, Op. 15 (1939)
- Legenda o štěstí (Legend of Happiness), Suite from the ballet, Op. 23b (1950–1953, 1955)
- Pekelné tance (Infernal Dances) from the ballet Legenda o štěstí, Op. 23c (1950–1953, 1958)
- Tři části (3 Sections) from the ballet Legenda o štěstí, Op. 23d (1950–1953, 1955)
- Taneční suita (Dance Suite) from the ballet Legenda o štěstí, Op. 23f (1950–1953, 1958)
- Symphony, Op. 25 (1957–1961)
- Rapsódická reportáž (Rhapsodic Report), Op. 28 (1959–1960)

Concertante

- Concerto for piano and orchestra, Op. 10 (1937–1943)
- Sinfonia pastorale concertante alla maniera di stile classico for flute, oboe, bassoon and chamber orchestra, Op.23a (1954); from the ballet Legenda o štěstí
- Diathema for viola and orchestra, Op. 24 (1955–1956)
- Barbar a růže (The Barbarian and the Rose) for piano and orchestra, Op. 27 (1958–1959)
- Glosae instrumentale for 2 pianos and chamber ensemble, Op. 32 (1965); unfinished

Chamber music

- String Quartet No. 1 in D minor, Op. 2 (1929)
- Suita pro hoboj a klavír (Suite for oboe and piano) (1929–1930)
- Violin Concerto for violin and piano, Op. 4 (1933)
- Wind Quintet for flute, oboe, clarinet, horn and bassoon, Op. 5 (1934–1935)
- String Quartet No. 2, Op. 16 (1940–1941)
- Slavnostní fanfáry (Brněnská konzervatoř) (Festive Fanfares for Brno Conservatory) (1943)
- String Quartet No. 3, Op. 21 (1944–1945)
- Divertimento mesto, Octet for flute, oboe, clarinet, horn, bassoon, violin, viola and cello, Op. 22 (1946–1947)
- Slavnostní fanfáry pro Univerzitu Palackého v Olomouci (Festive Fanfares for Palacký University of Olomouc) (1948)
- Cigánovy housle (The Gyspy's Violin) for violin and piano, Op. 29 (1960–1961)
- Fanfáry pro Janáčkovu akademii múzických umění v Brně (Fanfares for the Janáček Academy of Music and Performing Arts in Brno) for 4 trumpets, 3 trombones and tuba, Op. 30 (1961)

Piano

- Sonatina, Op. 6 (1935–1936)
- Romantické skladby (Romantic Pieces); 6 Pieces, Op. 7 (1936)
- Klavírní etudy (Etudes for Piano), Suite in 5 movements, Op. 8 (1936–1937)
- Klavírní etudy (Etudes for Piano), 2 Dances, Op. 11 (1937–1938)
- Index, 16 Pieces in 2 books, Op. 13 (1938)
- Elegie za Zdeničku (Elegy for Zdenička), Suite in 5 movements, Op. 20 (1944)

Choral

- Anemonky (The Anemones) for male chorus; words by Jaroslav Vrchlický
- Poštovní schránka (Mail Box) for mixed chorus, Op. 3 (1932); words by Jiří Wolker
- Tři mužské sbory (3 Male Choruses), Op. 14 (1939)
- Vlast Libušina (Libuše's Homeland), 3 female choruses a cappella, Op. 17 (1940); words by Alois Vojkůvka
- Zimní kantáta (Winter Cantata) for soprano, mixed chorus and orchestra, Op. 19 (1943–1945); words by Kamil Bednář
- Dva madrigaly (2 Madrigals) for female chorus a cappella, Op. 26 (1957)
- Světské requiem (Secular Requiem), Op. 33 (1964); unfinished

Vocal

- Jaro přichází (Spring Is Coming), 3 Songs for female voice and piano, Op. 1 (1925); words by M. Kaulfusová, Josef Václav Sládek and A. Nováková
- Podivný svět (Strange World), Cycle of 5 songs for tenor and piano (1925–1926); words by A. Kraus and M. Kaulfusová
- Ukolébavka (Lullaby) for voice and piano (1931); words by L. Beková
- Julie aneb Snář (Julie, or The Dream), Melodrama in 3 acts for soloists, chamber orchestra, jazz instruments and piano (1933–1934); words by Georges Neveux in Czech translation by Jindřich Hořejší
- Milostné balady (Love Ballads), 5 Songs for female voice and piano, Op. 18 (1943)
- Bithematicon, 4 Songs for baritone and piano, Op. 31 (1967)
- Rašení for voice and piano; words by František Serafínský Procházka
- Hvězdám for voice and piano; words by Jaroslav Vrchlický
- Sežloutla ta lípa for voice and piano; words by Jaroslav Vrchlický
- Balada horská for voice and piano; words by Jan Neruda
- Balada dětská for voice and piano; words by Jan Neruda
- Čerevený květ for voice and piano; words by Petr Bezruč
- Má matka hrála for voice and piano; words by Karel Hlaváček

== Students ==
- Pavel Blatný
- Ctirad Kohoutek
- Ivan Petrželka
- Alois Piňos
- Zdeněk Pololaník
- Zdeněk Zouhar
