= Jan Simonides Montanus =

Czech composer

Jan Simonides Montanus (d. 1587) was a composer of the Renaissance era from Bohemia. He was born in Kutná Hora and served a rector of the local choir.
