= Pavel Bořkovec =

Czech composer

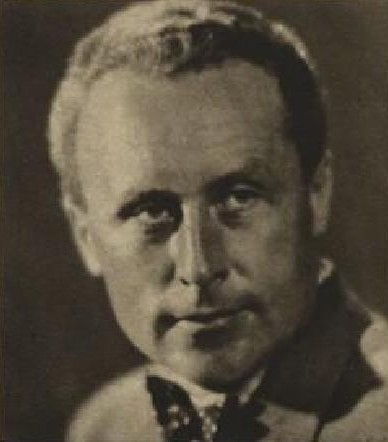
Bořkovec in 1937

Pavel Bořkovec (10 June 1894 – 22 July 1972) was a Czech composer and music teacher.

== Life ==
Bořkovec was born on 10 June 1894 in Prague. He studied at the Prague Conservatory under Josef Suk. From 1946 to 1967 he taught at the Academy of Musical Arts in Prague. His students there included Pavel Blatný, Jiří Pauer, Vladimír Sommer, Petr Eben, Jan Klusák and Jan Truhlář. Among his compositions are two operas, two piano concertos, a concerto grosso, a ballet, and five string quartets. His work was also part of the music event in the art competition at the 1932 Summer Olympics.

Bořkovec died on 22 July 1972 in Prague.

== Selected works ==
Stage

- Krysař, Ballet-Pantomime in 2 scenes (1939)
- Paleček, Opera (1959)
- Satyr, Opera after Johann Wolfgang von Goethe (1942)

Orchestra

- Concerto for cello and orchestra (1952)
- Concerto No.1 for piano and orchestra (1931)
- Concerto No.2 for piano and orchestra (1949–1950)
- Concerto for Violin and Orchestra
- Concerto grosso (1942)
- Partita per grande orchestra (1936)
- Sinfonietta in uno movimento (1967–1968)
- Symphony No.1, Op.6
- Symphony No.2 (1955)
- Symphony No.3 (1959)

Chamber music

- Dva tance, Tango a Menuet (2 Dances, Tango and Minuet) for saxophone (violin ad lib.) and piano
- Intermezzo for horn (or cello) and piano (1965)
- Nonet for flute, oboe, clarinet, horn, bassoon, violin, viola, cello and double bass (1940–1941)
- Quintet for flute, oboe, clarinet, horn and bassoon (1932)
- Sonata for viola solo, Op.12 (1933)
- Sonata No.1 for violin and piano (1934)
- Sonata No.2 for violin and piano (1956)
- Sonatina for violin and piano (1942)
- String Quartet No.1 (1925)
- String Quartet No.2, Op.7
- String Quartet No.3
- String Quartet No.4 (before 1948)
- String Quartet No.5 (1961)
- Sinfonietta da Camera

Piano

- Suite for Piano (1931)
- Dvě klavírní skladby (2 Piano Pieces)

Vocal

- Jen jedenkrát, Melodrama on a poem by P. Bezruče
- 7 Písní na básně Vítězslava Nezvala (7 Songs on Poems of Vítězslav Nezval) for soprano and piano, Op.15
- Rozmarné písně for baritone and piano (1932)
- Šest písní pro detský sbor (6 Songs for Children's Chorus) on poems by Jaroslav Seifert (1949)
- Sny (Dreams), 7 Songs for alto and orchestra
