= Jiří Rychnovský =

Czech composer (1545–1616)

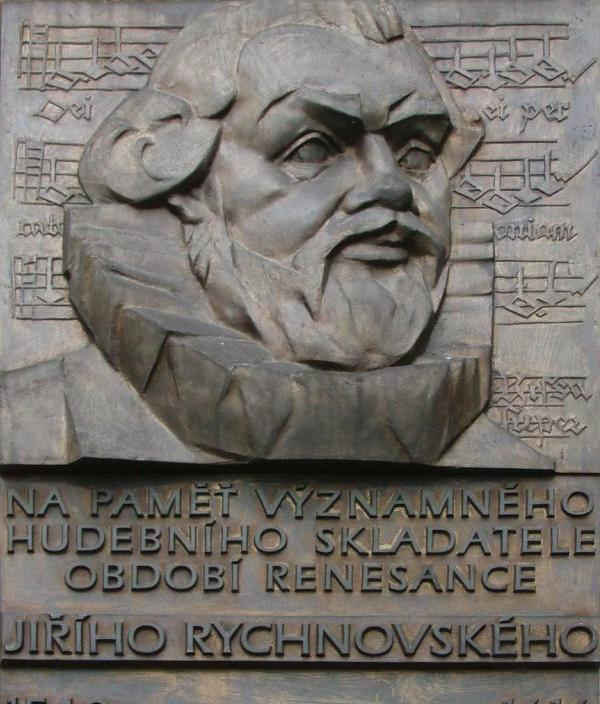

Jiří Rychnovský (1545, Rychnov nad Kněžnou – 1616, Chrudim) was a Czech composer of the Renaissance and early Baroque era. He was the mayor of Chrudim. His musical work consists of Czech and Latin sacred music with advanced vocal polyphony, revealing a knowledge of European designs, but also the efforts of self-expression. His compositions have been recorded in manuscripts of the Literary Society in St. Michael in New Town in Prague. It is one of the few surviving complete collections of Czech Renaissance sacred music. He usually wrote under his Latin name Georgius Rychnovinus.
