= Jan Zdeněk Bartoš =

Czech composer (1908–1981)

Jan Zdeněk Bartoš (4 June 1908 – 1 June 1981) was a Czech composer.

== Biography ==
Bartoš was born on 4 June 1908 in Dvůr Králové nad Labem. He started to play the violin as a pupil of Karel Hršel in Hradec Králové. In 1924, after he graduated from business school, Bartoš left for France. He played as a concertmaster of the Messageries Maritimes naval company in Marseille. From 1929 to 1931 he travelled with that company to Africa, Asia and Madagascar. Following his return, he studied music theory with Otakar Šín and Jaroslav Křička at the Prague Conservatory. He graduated in 1943. From 1956 he worked at the Czech Ministry of Education and taught composition and music theory at the Prague Conservatory.

He composed two operas, an operetta, four symphonies, chamber music, cantatas, songs cycles and theatre music. His work was also part of the music event in the art competition at the 1948 Summer Olympics.

Bartoš died on 1 June 1981 in Prague, shortly before his 73rd birthday.

== Selected works ==
Stage

- Král manéže (Master of the Ring), Burlesque Ballet-Pantomime in 14 scenes
- Prokletý zámek (The Cursed Mansion), Opera in 1 act (1951); libretto by Zdeněk Lorenc

Orchestra

- Symphony No.1 for large orchestra, Op.65 (1952)
- Symphony No.2 for (chamber) orchestra, Op.78 (1956–1957)
- Symphony No.3 for string orchestra (1964–1965)
- Symphony No.5
- Symphony No.6 for brass quartet and string orchestra (1974)
- Symphony No.7 (1977)

Concert band

- Z podkrkonošského špalíčku (1973)

Concertante

- Introdukce a rondo (Introduction and Rondo) for violin and orchestra, Op.13 (1937)
- Concertino for bassoon and orchestra, Op.34 (1943)
- Staří přátele (Old Friends), Concertante Suite for viola, double bass and 9 wind instruments (1964)
- Symphony No.4, Concertante Symphony for oboe d'amore and string orchestra (1968)
- Concerto da camera for viola and string orchestra (1970)
- Concerto for violin and string orchestra (1972)
- Concerto per "Due Boemi" for bass clarinet, piano and string orchestra (1975)
- Koncert pro trio for violin, viola, cello and string orchestra (1975)
- Sonata for Trombone, 12 strings and piano (1978)
- Capriccio concertant for oboe and chamber orchestra (1979)

Chamber music

- Partita for viola solo, Op.36 (1944)
- String Quartet No.2, Op.43 (1946)
- Sonatina for viola and piano, Op.46 (1947)
- Duet for 2 violins, Op.60 (1951)
- String Quartet No.3
- String Quartet No.4
- String Quartet No.5 „Aby celý svět byl zahradou“ (Were the Whole World a Garden), Op.66 (1952)
- Elegie for cello and piano (or organ) (1952)
- Divertimento No.1 for flute, 2 oboes, 2 clarinets, 2 horns and 2 bassoons (1960)
- Piano Quartet, Op.81
- Trio for violin, viola and harp (1961)
- Preludia (Preludes) for flute and piano (1963)
- Musica piccola, Suite for student violin ensemble and piano (1964)
- Trio for violin, viola and cello, Op.123 (1967)
- Miniatury (Miniatures), Instructive Pieces for cello and piano (1970)
- Adagio Elegiaco and Rondo for horn and piano (1974)
- Nonet No.2 for flute, oboe, clarinet, bassoon, horn, violin, viola, cello, double bass (1974)
- Piano Trio No.2 (1974)
- Deset skladbiček (10 Little Pieces) for 3 recorders (1976)
- Fantazie for viola solo (1980)
- Tercettino for oboe, clarinet and bassoon (1981)
- Divertimento No.7 for 3 clarinets
- String Quartet No.6 „In miniatura“
- String Quartet No.7 „Quator Wegimont“
- String Quartet No.8, Op.86
- String Quartet No.9
- String Quartet No.10
- String Quartet No.11

Piano

- Dvouhlasé invence (2-Part Inventions) for piano, Op.5
- Maličkosti (Bagatelles) for piano (1947)
- Sonata No.1 for Piano (1956)
- Sonata No.2 „Giocosa“ for piano, Op.82 (1959)

Vocal

- Meditace na Štursova "Raněného" (Meditation on Jan Štursa's "The Wounded") for mezzo-soprano and string orchestra (or string quartet), Op.76 (1956); words by Renata Pandulová
- Dětem (To Children), Song Cycle on Words by Zdeněk Kriebl for soprano and piano (1972)

Choral

- Píseň domova (Song of Home) for mixed chorus (1969); words by Vladimír Stuchl
