= Pavel Spongopaeus Jistebnický =

Czech composer

Pavel Spongopaeus Jistebnický (b. 1550–1560 in Jistebnice u Tábora — d. 1619 in Kutná Hora) was a composer of the Renaissance and early Baroque era from Bohemia. He worked as a teacher all his life. He took several different posts and in 1598, at the latest, he permanently settled in Kutná Hora, where he worked as an administrator of the school and also as an elder of the Latin literary choir at St. James Church. He is counted among the most prolific Czech composers of his time. Today we know 60 of his compositions. Only the four-voice composition Králi nad králi, Pane has been preserved complete in Prachatice. As for all the other compositions (extensive six to eight-voice mass cycles), too few voice parts have been preserved to get an idea of the character and quality of his music.
