= Miloslav Ištvan =

Czech composer (1928–1990)

Miloslav Ištvan (2 September 1928 in Olomouc – 26 January 1990 in Brno) was a Czech composer. His work was inspired by the works of Béla Bartók and by the orientation of the modal style of folk songs. He studied Romanian and African folklore. He also attempted a synthesis of classical and pop music genres.

In 1947 he graduated at the gymnasium in Brno-Žabovřesky, and later he pursued his studies at the Janáček Academy of Music and Performing Arts in Brno. He studied composition as a pupil of Jaroslav Kvapil.

== Selected works ==
Piano:

- Miniatures (1952)
- Sonata (1954)
- Sonata No. 2 (1959)
- 5 Impromptus (1956)

Chamber:

- Rondo for Viola and Piano (1950)
- Sonata for Clarinet and Piano (1954)
- Suite for French Horn and Piano (1955)
- Trio for Cello and Piano (1950)
- Trio for Violin, Piano and Cello (1958)
- Partita for Wind Instruments (1957)
- String Quartet (1951)

Orchestral:

- Symphony (1952)
- Czechoslovak Suite (1951)
- Concert-Symphony for Piano and Orchestra (1958)
- Balada o jihu (Ballad About South) (1960)
