= Tučapy =

Tučapy may refer to places in the Czech Republic:

- Tučapy (Tábor District), a municipality and village in the South Bohemian Region
- Tučapy (Vyškov District), a municipality and village in the South Moravian Region
- Tučapy (Uherské Hradiště District), a municipality and village in the Zlín Region
- Tučapy, a village and part of Dub nad Moravou in the Olomouc Region
- Tučapy, a village and part of Holešov in the Zlín Region
