= List of Czech recipients of international music awards =

== Recordings ==
Grand Prix du disque de l'Académie Charles Cros

- 1960 Bohuslav Martinů - 6th Symphony "Fantasies symphoniques" by Czech Philharmonic Orchestra, conducted by Karel Ančerl
- 1966 Leoš Janáček - String Quartets Nos. 1 and 2 by The Janáček Quartet
- 2006 Karel Ančerl Gold Edition, the collection of 42 remastered albums conducted by Karel Ančerl, recorded 1950–1968 and released 2002–2005 by Supraphon label.

Cannes Classical Awards

- 2003 - Jan Dismas Zelenka: Sub olea pacis et palma virtutis by Musica Florea ensemble, conducted Marek Štryncl

== See also ==
- Music of the Czech Republic
