= List of compositions by Tomáš Svoboda =

The following is a list of compositions by Tomáš Svoboda restricted to the works of his that have been published.

== Orchestral works ==
- Concerto for Marimba & Orchestra, Op.148 (1995)
- Concerto for Violin & Orchestra, Op.77 (1975)
- Concerto No. 1 for Piano & Orchestra, Op.71 (1974)
- Concerto No. 2 for Piano & Orchestra, Op.134 (1989)
- Dance Suite for Orchestra, Op.128 (1987)
- Ex Libris for Orchestra, Op.113 (1983)
- Festive Overture for Orchestra, Op.103 (1981–82)
- Nocturne (Cosmic Sunset) for Orchestra, Op.100 (1980–81)
- Overture of the Season for Orchestra, Op.89 (1978)
- Reflections for Orchestra, Op.53 (1968)
- Remembrance - Chorale for Trumpet & Orchestra, Op.152a (1997)
- Serenade for Orchestra, Op.115 (1984)
- Sinfonietta (à la Renaissance) for Orchestra, Op.60 (1972)
- Spring Overture for Orchestra, Op.172 (2002)
- Swing Dance for Orchestra, Op.135a (1992)
- Symphony No. 1 (of Nature), Op.20 for Orchestra (1956–57)
- Symphony No. 2 for Orchestra, Op.41 (1963–64)
- Symphony No. 3 for Organ & Orchestra, Op.43 (1965)
- Symphony No. 4 (Apocalyptic) for Orchestra, Op.69 (1975)
- Symphony No. 5 (in Unison) for Orchestra, Op.92 (1978)
- Symphony No. 6 for Clarinet & Orchestra, Op.137 (1991)
- Three Cadenzas for Piano & Orchestra, Op.135 (1990)
- Three Pieces for Orchestra, Op.45 (1966)

== Orchestral works (with voices) ==
- Child's Dream - Cantata for Children's Choir & Orchestra, Op.66 (1973)
- Journey - Cantata for Mezzo-soprano, Baritone, Choir & Orchestra, Op.127 (1987)

== Works for chamber orchestra ==
- Baroque Suite for Bassoon, Harpsichord & String Orchestra, Op.39 (1962)
- Chorale from 15th Century, for English Horn & Strings, Op.52f (1949–78) (arr.1993)
- Concertino for Harp & Chamber Orchestra, Op.34 (1961)
- Concerto for Chamber Orchestra (Returns), Op.125 (1986)
- Concerto No. 1 for Piano & Orchestra, Op.71 (1974)
- Meditation for Oboe and Strings, Op.143 (1993)
- Oriental Echoes for String Orchestra, Op.140 (1992)
- Prelude & Fugue for String Orchestra, Op.67 (1974)
- Six Variations for Violin & String Orchestra, Op.32 (1961)

== Works for large ensemble ==
- Celebration of Life - Cantata on Aztec Poetry, Op.80 (1976)
- Concertino for Oboe, Brass Choir & Timpani, Op.46 (1966)

== Vocal/choral works ==
- Aria for Soprano and 4 Instruments, Op.153 (1996)
- Chorale Without Words for Mixed Choir & Piano, Op. 91a (1984)
- Czernogorsk Fugue for Choir, Op.14 (1956; rev. ?)
- Festival for Men's Choir, Op.129b (1987)
- Separate Solitude for Choir & Two Clarinets, Op.64 (1973)
- Veritas Veritatum for Men's Choir, Op.129a (1987)

== Works for ensemble (5 or more players) ==
- Baroque Quintet for Flute, Oboe, Clarinet, Cello & Piano coperto, Op.37 (1962)
- Brass Quintet, Op.112 (1983)
- Chorale in E flat for Piano Quintet (homage to Aaron Copland), Op.118 (1985)
- Concerto for Woodwind Quintet, Op.111 (1983–97)
- Farewell Matinee for Brass Quintet, Op.160 (1997)
- Intrata for Brass Quintet, Op.127a (1987)
- Suite for Piano and 5 Percussionists, Op.83 (1977)

== Chamber works (duos, trios, quartets) ==
- Ballade for Bassoon & Piano, Op.35 (1961)
- Baroque Trio for Vibraphone, Electric Guitar & Piano, Op.109 (1982)
- Chorale from 15th Century for Flute & Piano, Op.52b (1993)
- Classical Sonatine for Oboe and Piano, Op.28 (1960)
- Concerto for Marimba & Orchestra (Marimba/Piano Reduction), Op.148a (1995)
- Confession - One Movement for Clarinet, Op.122 (1985)
- Conversations for Two Clarinets, Op.157 (1997)
- Divertimento for Piano & Timpani, Op.16 (1956)
- Dreams of a Dancer for Flute, Clarinet & Piano, Op.164 (1999)
- Duo Concerto for Trumpet & Organ, Op.152 (1997)
- Duo for Clarinet B flat & Cello, Op.50 (1967)
- Duo for Xylophone & Marimba, Op.141 (1993)
- Five Studies for Two Timpanists, Op.88 (1978)
- Forest Rhythms for Flute, Viola & Xylophone, Op.150 (1995)
- March of the Puppets for Guitar, Xylophone & 4-Temple Blocks, Op.95 (1979)
- Morning Prayer for Four Percussion, Op.101 (1981)
- Neo-Renaissance Trio for Ob (Fl or Vl), Vla & Vcl, Op.131a (1987)
- Nocturne for Organ, 4-hand, Op.155 (1996)
- Partita in D for Viola da Gamba & Harpsichord, Op.161 (1998)
- Passacaglia & Fugue for Violin, Cello & Piano, Op.87 (1978–81)
- Phantasy for Violin, Cello & Piano, Op.120 (1985)
- Quartet for Four French Horns, Op.145 (1993)
- Recessional March for Two Percussionists, Op.59 (1974)
- Six Fragments for Woodwind Trio (Ob., Clar. & Bsn.), Op.131 (1987)
- Six Variations for Violin & Piano (String Orchestra), Op.32a (1961)
- Sonata for Clarinet & Piano, Op.167 (2000)
- Sonata for Viola & Piano, Op.36 (1961)
- Sonata for Violin & Piano, Op.73 (1974–84)
- Sonatine for Flute, Clarinet and Piano, Op.154 (1996)
- Storm Session for Electric Guitar & Bass Guitar, Op.126 (1987)
- String Quartet No. 1, Op.29 (1960)
- String Quartet No. 2, Op.151 (1996)
- Suite for Piano, 4-hands, Op.124 (1985)
- Summer Trio for Oboe, Clarinet and Bassoon, Op.159 (1997)
- Theme & Variations for Flute, Clarinet & Piano, Op.142 (1992)
- Three Fughettas for Piano, 4 hands, Op.12 (1956)
- Trio (van Gogh) for Violin, Cello & Piano, Op.116 (1984)

== Works for solo instrument ==
- Autumn for Koto, Op.110 (1982–83)
- Confession - One Movement for Clarinet, Op.122 (1985)
- Discernment of Time for Gong Solo, Op.74 (1975)
- Folk Dance for Clarinet, Op.132 (1988)
- Pastorale for Flute, Op.78 (1975)
- Scherzo for Bassoon, Op.104 (1982)
- Sonata for Guitar, Op.99 (1980)
- Suite for Cello, Op.147 (1994)
- Suite for Guitar, Op.102 (1981)
- Toccatino for Oboe, Op.114 (1984)
- Wedding Dance for Marimba, Op.138a (1991)

== Works for solo keyboard instruments ==
- A Bird for Piano, Op.1 (1949)
- Autumn for Piano, Op.110a (1982–83)
- Bagatelles "In a Forest" for Piano, Op.42 (1964–65)
- Benedictus for Piano, Op.162 (1998)
- Children's Treasure Box, Vol. I, for Piano, Op.81 (1977)
- Children's Treasure Box, Vol. II, for Piano, Op.86 (1978)
- Children's Treasure Box, Vol. III, for Piano, Op.90 (1978)
- Children's Treasure Box, Vol. IV, for Piano, Op.91 (1978)
- Eulogy, for Piano, Op.146 (1994)
- Farewell to Prague for Piano, Op.165 (1999)
- Four Waltzes for Piano, Op.68 (1974)
- Fugue in c-minor (on a Theme by Bach), for Piano, Op.9 (1955)
- Fugue in d-minor (on Bulgarian National Anthem), for Piano, Op.17 (1955)
- Nine Etudes in Fugue Style (Vol. I), for Piano, Op.44 (1965–66)
- Nine Etudes in Fugue Style (Vol. II), for Piano, Op.98 (1980–84)
- Nocturne for Piano, Op.84 (1977)
- Offertories for Organ (Vol. I), Op.52a (1949–96)
- Prelude in g-minor for Piano, Op.3a (1954)
- Quiet Piece for Piano, Op.63 (1973)
- Sonata No. 2 for Piano, Op.121 (1985)
- Sonatina for Piano, Op.123 (1985)
- Suite for Harpsichord, Op.105 (1982)
- Troika in Taiga for Piano, Op.21 (1956)
- Wedding March for Organ, Op.94 (1979)

== See also ==
- Orchestral Works by Tomas Svoboda (Oregon Symphony, 2003)
