= Vycpálek =

Vycpálek is a Czech surname. Notable people with the surname include:

- Čestmír Vycpálek (1921–2002), Czech football player and manager
- Ladislav Vycpálek (1882–1969), Czech composer and violist
