= Ančerl =

Ančerl may refer to:

- Karel Ančerl (born Antscherl; 1908–1973), Czech conductor and composer
- 21801 Ančerl, minor planet named after Karel Ančerl
