= Sylvie Bodorová =

Czech composer (born 1954)

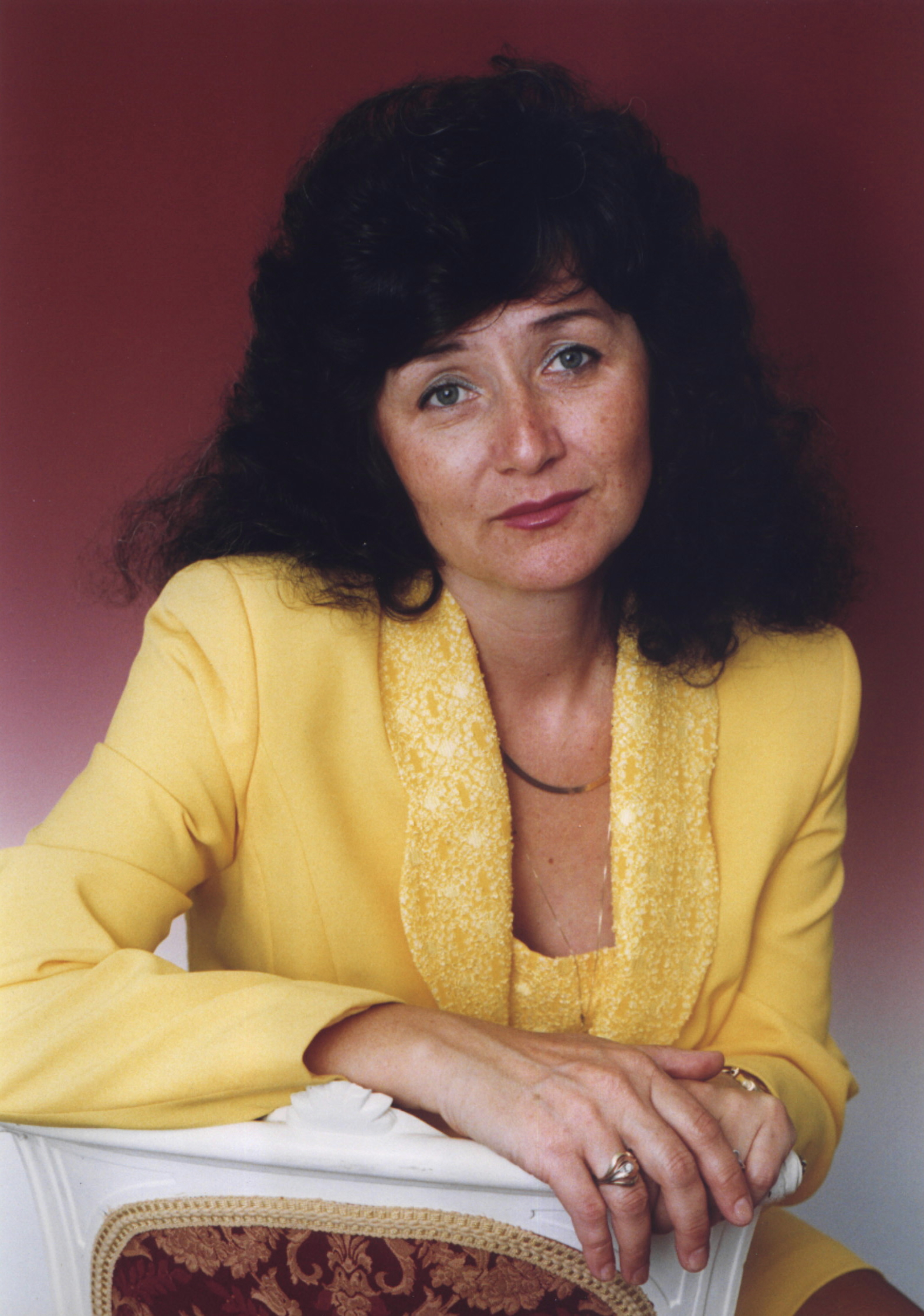
Sylvie Bodorová

Sylvie Bodorová (born 31 December 1954, České Budějovice) is a Czech composer. During a career spanning from the late 1970s to the present day she has composed a large number of works for various instruments, both solo and orchestral pieces, and produced commissions for cities, festivals and organisations around the world. She was a founder (and only surviving) member of the Czech classical group Quattro, formed in 1996.

== Biography ==
Bodorová studied composition at the Janáček Academy of Music and Performing Arts (JAMU) in Brno and later as a post-graduate at the Music and Dance Faculty of the Academy of Performing Arts in Prague. She continued her studies in Gdańsk and the Accademia Musicale Chigiana in Siena (with Professor Franco Donatoni) and from 1987 she attended Professor Ton de Leeuw's composition courses in Amsterdam. She taught at JAMU in Brno and, in the 1990s, at the University of Cincinnati College-Conservatory of Music, where she was visiting professor for the 1994–95 and 1995–96 academic years. In 1993 she had made her first visit to the United States for a week-long residency in the School of Fine Arts at Miami University, Ohio. The music library at the University of Cincinnati contains several of Bodorová's published scores, as well as copies of manuscript scores of her works.

Bodorová's works have been performed on every continent, including Antarctica, where there was a performance of her "Homage to Columbus" for guitar in 1997. She has received several competition prizes (Mannheim, Czech Radio Prague) and several commissions from the Warwick Festival: Megiddo - Piano Trio - 2001, for the same festival -Terezin Ghetto Requiem - Škampa Quartet - 1998, "Ama me" for baritone and piano - 1999 and Vertumnus - Brass Quintet in 2005.

In 1999 she also wrote compositions for Buenos Aires – Concierto de Estío for Guitar and Orchestra – and for Bochum in Germany – Saturnalia for Orchestra. After the success of Terezín Ghetto Requiem, the Prague Spring International Music Festival commissioned the oratorio Juda Maccabeus for a performance in St. Vitus Cathedral (with Gabriela Beňačková, Aleš Briscein, Ivan Kusnjer and the Prague Philharmonic Choir) in May 2002 and then at the Litomyšl International Festival in June 2002. Concerto dei fiori for Violin and Strings was premiered at the Prague Spring Festival 1997, then performed in the United States in 1998 and the PONTES Festival in Prague.

Terezin Ghetto Requiem for Baritone and String Quartet was performed at the Warwick and Leamington Festival in July 1998, Wigmore Hall in London in October 1998, again in Warwick in July 1999, other festivals in UK, in Berlin (November 1999), in Halle (Saale), Terezín, at the Prague Spring Festival 2000, Coventry and Huddersfield (November 2000). In 2003 Bodorová finished a commission by the Tucson Winter Chamber Music Festival – a composition for Harp and Strings Mysterium druidum. She composed Rotationes for clarinet, violin, viola and cello for the same festival in 2012.

She finished the commission for Camerata Bern (Bern Concerto, Silberwolke) – Concerto for Violin, Viola and Strings, which was performed in Bern and Germany in August and September 2005. She wrote the piano concerto Come d'accordo for Prague Philharmonia and pianist Martin Kasík, premiered in February 2006, the song cycle Slovak Songs for Štefan Margita and Gabriela Beňačková – the cycle was recorded in 2006 – and Amor tenet omnia – a cycle of choruses on the texts from Carmina Burana premiered in Luxembourg and France in August 2007.

The oratorio Moses was commissioned by the International Litomyšl Smetana Festival and premiered in 2008. In 2009 she wrote Carmina lucemburgiana for strings. It was commissioned by the Government of the Grand Duchy of Luxembourg and its embassy in Prague. In May 2012 Bodorová finished Lingua angelorum – a song cycle for baritone and large symphony orchestra inspired by Rudolf II. The composition was commissioned by and was dedicated to Thomas Hampson. She wrote the orchestral version of Dvořák's Gypsy Melodies, Op. 55, for Thomas Hampson and Wiener Virtuosen, which premiered at the Musikverein in Vienna in February 2013.

Bodorová was a member of Quattro, a group of Czech composers formed in 1996, also featuring Otmar Mácha (1922–2006), Luboš Fišer (1935–1999) and Zdeněk Lukáš (1928–2007). She is also involved in the restoration of Gustav Mahler's birthplace in Kaliště near Humpolec in the Czech Republic. She has also composed and arranged many compositions for children. Her music often features references to Johann Sebastian Bach's music (such as a quotation of his choral "Schmücke dich o liebe Seele" at the end of Concerto dei fiori and transcriptions of Preludium C moll from Wohl Temperiertes Klavier, Toccata D minor), and to Roma and Eastern European rhythms (her ancestors are from Hungary).

== List of compositions ==
=== Operas ===
- The Legend of Catharine of Redern, commissioned by Reichenberg - Liberec Theater (2014), duration 120' premiere 19. XII. 2014

=== Orchestral and concerto works ===
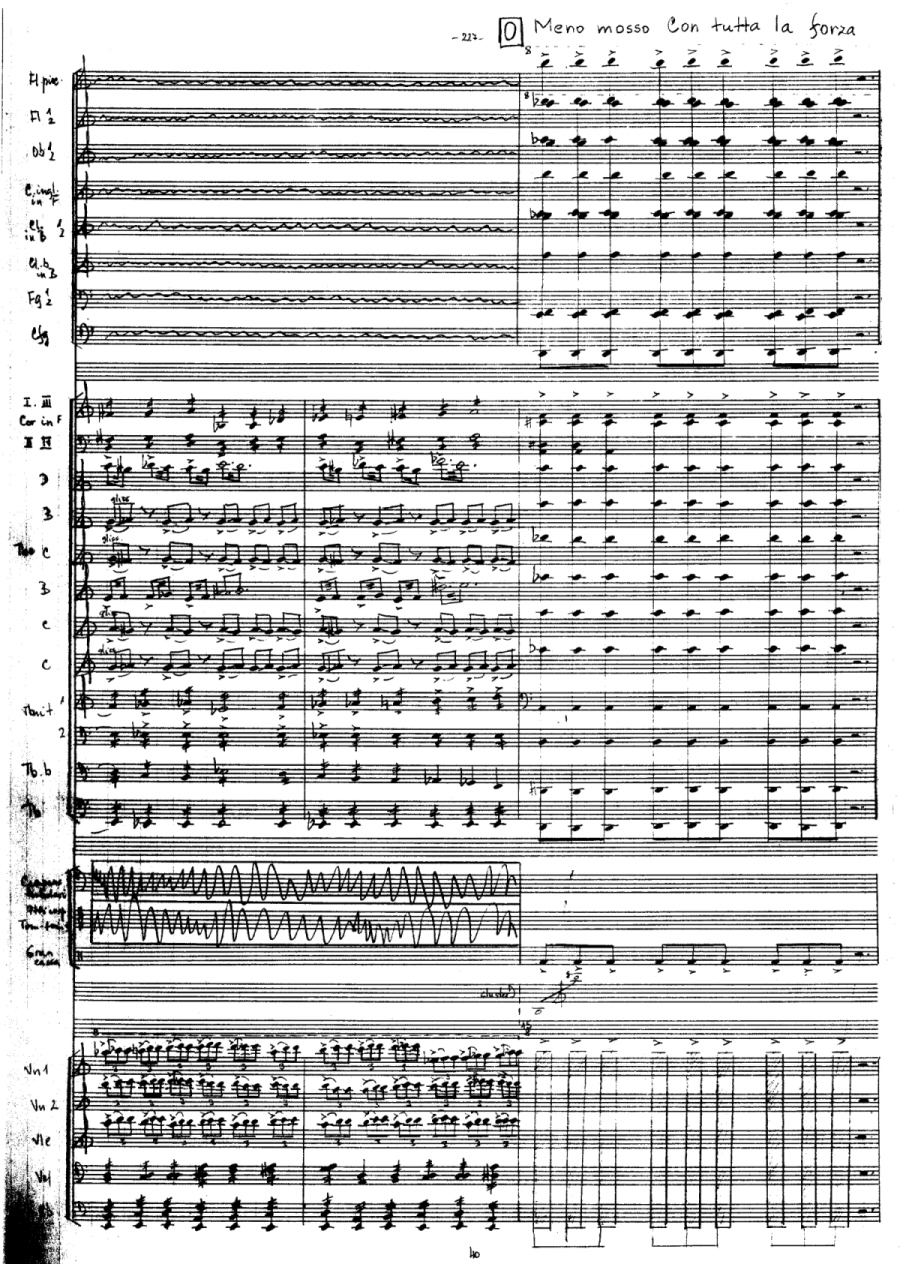
Page of the autograph score from the oratorio Juda Maccabeus by Bodorová

- Plankty, Music for viola and symphonic orchestra (1982), duration 14'
- The struggle with an Angel, Melodram for male voice and strings – also version for voice and string quartet – to the text of poem by Jaroslav Seifert (1982), duration 10'
- Pontem video, Concerto for organ, strings and timpani (1983), duration 15'
- Jubiloso, Festive music for chamber orchestra (1984), duration 8'
- Tre canzoni da suonare for guitar and strings (1985), duration 17'
- Panamody for flute and strings (1986), duration 8'
- Magikon for oboe and strings (1987), duration 10'
- Messaggio, Concerto for violin and orchestra (1989), duration 16'
- Dona nobis lucem, Concerto for soprano, violin, guitar and strings (1994), duration 11'
- Concerto dei fiori, Concerto for violin and strings or piano (1996), duration 17'
- Concierto de Estío for guitar and strings – also version for guitar and string quartet, duration 16'
- Canzonetta d'amore for saxophon and strings (1999), duration 4'
- Saturnalia for large orchestra (1999), duration 17'
- Cantabile Amadeo for string orchestra (2001), duration 6'
- Juda Maccabeus, Oratorio for soprano, tenor, baritone, three speakers, children choir, mixed choir and big symphony orchestra (2002), duration 73'
- Mysterium druidum, Concerto for harp and strings – also version for harp and string quartet, dedicated to the harpist Kateřina Englichová (2003), duration 20'
- Ave Noëlle – Christmas song for tenor or soprano and large orchestra (2003), duration 7'
- Bern Concerto "Silberwolke", Concerto for violin, viola and strings (2005), commissioned and premiered by CAMERATA BERN, duration 18'
- Terezín Ghetto Requiem for baritone and strings (2005), duration 17'
- Come d'accordo, Concerto for piano and orchestra (2006), commissioned by Prague Philharmonia, duration 21'
- Vivat Mozart ! Hommage á Mozart for the Chateau Litomyšl for brass and percussion, commissioned by 48th International Music Festival Smetana's Litomyšl, duration 9'
- Moses, Oratorio for soprano, tenor, baritone, two speakers, percussion, children and mixed choir and big symphony orchestra (2008), commissioned and premiered by International Music Festival Litomyšl to the 50th anniversary, duration 78'
- Karslbader Ouverture for symphony orchestra (2008), commissioned by Dvořák's Autumn Festival in Karlsbad to the 50th anniversary, duration 11'
- Carmina lucemburgiana for Strings – To the memory of John the Blind (2009), commissioned by the Government of the Grand Duchy of Luxembourg and its embassy in Prague, duration 16'
- Kafkas Träume for Baritone and Orchestra (2010), commissioned by the Luxembourg Sinfonietta, duration 11',
- Babadag Concertino for clarinet, percussion and strings (2010) duration 8'
- Trebbia – Avanti, Ouverture for symphony orchestra (2010), duration 7'
- Symphony No 1 "Con le campane" for large orchestra (2011), duration 35'
- Lingua angelorum – Song Cycle for Baritone and Symphony Orchestra inspired by Rudolf the Second Era (2012), commissioned by and is dedicated to Thomas Hampson, duration 50'

=== Chamber music ===
Strings:

Solo:

- Giľa Rome, Meditation for solo viola, (1980), duration 5',
- Dža more, Gypsy ballad for solo violin (1990), duration 5',
- Rosa triste for solo violin (1993), duration 5'

Duets:

- Sine dolore for violin and cello (1989), duration 5'
- Concerto dei fiori, Concerto for violin and piano (1996), duration 17' (orchestral version), duration 13' (chamber version)
- Ancora una volta primavera Sonata for violin and piano (1992), duration 12'
- De Dagmar regina for violin and accordion (2012), duration 7'

Trios:

- Pre-Visions, Fresques for piano trio (1983), duration 8'
- Megiddo for violin, cello and piano (2001), duration 15'
- La Speranza for clarinet, cello and piano (1993), duration 8'
- Raffiche di vento for flute, viola and cello (2009), duration 11'
- Vallja e malit - Dancing Mountain for violin, clarinet and piano (2017), duration 13 ´

Quartets and Quintets:

- Dignitas homini, String quartet No. 1 (1987), duration 10'
- Struggle with an Angel, Melodrama for male voice and string quartet to the text of poem by Jaroslav Seifert (1988), duration 10'
- Terezín Ghetto Requiem for baritone and string quartet (1998), duration 16'
- Hélios for flute, violin, cello and piano (1998), duration 8'
- Concierto de Estío for guitar and string quartet (1999), duration 16'
- Shofarot, String quartet No. 4 (2000), duration 13'
- Rotationes for clarinet, violin, viola and cello (2012), duration 18'

More than five performers:

- "Wenn wir in höchsten Nöten" – Die Kunst der Fuge for two string quartets and harp (2004), transcriptions of selected parts of Bach's work with own compositions, duration 43'

Winds:

Solo:

- Saluti da Siena per clarinetto solo (1981), duration 5'
- Léthé per flauto solo (1989), duration 4'
- Laugaritio per fagotto solo (1994), duration 7'

Duets:

- The Fragrance of Summer, Miniattacca for flute and piano (1976), duration 6'
- Musica dedicata di Due Boemi di Praga for bassclarinet and piano (1980), duration 6'
- Panamody for flute and piano (1986), duration 8'
- Magikon for oboe and piano (1987), duration 10'
- Transflautato for flute and piano (2014), commissioned by Prague Spring International Festival, duration 10'

More performers:

- Anvils, Meditation for Due Boemi di Praga and wind quintet (1984), duration 12'
- Ventimiglia for trumpet and 6 percussion players (1992), also version for soprano and prcussion, duration 11'
- Hélios per flauto, oboe, fagotto, violoncello e cembalo(1994), duration 8'
- Vertumnus, Five pictures from Rudolphinian Prague for brass quintet (2004), 2 trumpets, French horn, trombone, tuba, duration 18'

=== Vocal and vocal-instrumental works ===
- Ventimiglia for soprano and six percussion players (1992), duration 11'
- Dona nobis lucem, Concerto for soprano, violin, guitar and strings (1994), duration 11
- Terezín Ghetto Requiem for baritone and string quartet (1998), duration 16'
- Ama me, Song cycle for baritone, or mezzo, and piano (1999), duration 17'
- Juda Maccabeus, Oratorio for soprano, tenor, baritone, three speakers, children and mixed choirs and big symphony orchestra (2002), duration 73', score and parts Prague Spring International Music Festival
- Ave Noëlle, Christmas song for tenor or soprano and symphony orchestra (2003), duration 7'
- Ave Noëlle, Christmas song for tenor or soprano and piano (2003), duration 7'
- Terezín Ghetto Requiem for baritone and string orchestra (2005), duration 17'
- Sadaj, slnko, sadaj – The Setting Sun, Seven Slovak Folksongs for Two Voices, Harp and Piano (2005), also version for one or two voices with harp or piano, duration 13' 1. "Čo sa stalo nové" ("What's happened new"); 2. "Dala som mu pierko" "I gave him a feather"3 . "Sadaj, slnko, sadaj" ("Set, sun, set"); 4. "Neorem, nesejem" (I sow not and plough not) 5. "Zavej že, vetricok" ("Blow little breeze"), 6. "Prečo že ma" ("Why is that?) 7. "Opýtaj sa Baláža" ("Go ask Balaz").
- JA RA LAJ, 27 compositions for tenor, violin, viola, clarinet, harp, percussion and strings inspired by Slovak, Balkan and Gypsy music (2009), duration 50'
- Apple Train, 7 songs for soprano and piano on texts by Jan Skácel (2009), duration 19'

Choir works

- Amor tenet omnia, three compositions for mixed choir, two pianos and percussion on the texts from Carmina burana collection (2007), duration 12'

=== Guitar works ===
- Baltic miniatures for guitar solo (1979), duration 8'
- Fairy tales for flute and guitar (1980), duration 10'
- Violet diary for guitar solo (1985), composition for children, duration 6'
- Tre canzoni da suonare for guitar and strings (1985), duration 17'
- Elegy for guitar solo – Homage to Columbus (1988), duration 5'
- Sostar mange, Gypsy ballade for guitar solo (1991), duration 10'
- Dona nobis lucem, Concerto for soprano, violin, guitar and strings (1994), duration 11'
- Concierto de Estío for guitar and strings (1999), also for guitar and string quartet, duration 16'
- Plegaria, Prayer for guitar solo (2000), duration 5'

=== Harp, piano, organ ===
- Musica per organo (1982), duration 7'
- Pre-Visions, Frescos for piano trio (1983), duration 8'
- Pontem video, Concerto for organ, strings and percussion (1983), duration 14'
- La Speranza for clarinet, cello and piano (1993), duration 8'
- Fade-outs, Fresco for piano solo (1987), duration 6'
- Megiddo for violin, cello and piano (2001), duration 15'
- Mysterium druidum (2003), concerto for harp and strings, also harp and string quartet, duration 18'
- Come d'accordo, Concerto for piano and orchestra (2006), duration 16', commissioned and premiered by Prague Philharmonia
- Come d'accordo, Concerto for two pianos (2006) – chamber version, duration 16'
- Three Sonnets Sonata for Piano, (2013), ArcoDiva, duration 17', commissioned by 21st Tucson Winter Chamber Music Festival
- Emek ha-bacha / The Valle of Tears for Organ Solo, (2017), ArcoDiva, duration 9'

=== Music for children ===
- Cat colouring book for piano (1974), duration 5'
- Tůňka – Small swimming hole, small opera ballet for children (1976), duration 25'
- Violet diary Cycle of children compositions for children (1985), duration 4'
- Vezeme písničku – We carry on the song to the texts of poems by Věra Provazníková, cycle of songs for small children (1985), duration 8'
- Carousel for piano (2000), duration 1', ABRSM PUBLISHING
- Vindobona for piano (2003), duration 3'

=== Arrangements or orchestrations of other composers ===
- Antonín Dvořák Gypsy Melodies, Op. 55 for baritone/soprano(tenor) and chamber orchestra (2012), duration 16'

commissioned by Thomas Hampson with Wiener Virtuosi

== Selected discography ==
- Jana Jarkovská - flute (2022), / Danza del diavolo, Hélios, Summer Scents, Panamody, Via maris, Transflautato, Snow and stars/, Radioservis CR 1117–2
- Kristina Fialová - viola (2021), / Gila Rome for viola solo/, ArcoDiva UP 0236
- Vladimír Ráž, New Chamber Orchestra, Vladimír Rejšek (2021), / Zápas s andělem, melodram na slova J. Seiferta/, ArcoDiva UP 0232
- Jitka Hosprová, Prague Radio Symphony Orchestra, Jan Kučera (2020), / Planctus for Viola and Orchestra/, Supraphon SU 4276
- Jana Jarkovská - flute (2020), / Léthé/, Radioservis CR 1061
- Michaela Rózsa Růžičková, Hana Dobešová, Ladislava Vondráčková (2019), / Slovak Duets/, ArcoDiva UP 0210
- Trio Clavio (2018), /Vallja e malit - Dancing Mountain/, ArcoDiva UP 0204
- Eva Garajová - Ama me (2016), /Ama me - Song Cycle, Three Psalms/, ArcoDiva UP 0184
- Eben Trio – Elegiac Stories (2012) / Prefigurations – Piano trio / ArcoDiva UP 0143
- Dana Vlachová – violin (2012) / Sine dolore for Violin and Cello, dedicated to Josef Vlach / ArcoDiva UP 0146
- Irvin Epoque – CrossOver (2012) / Babadag for Clarinet and String Quartet / ArcoDiva UP 0147
- Bohemian Music for Flute and Guitar (2012) / Fairy-Tales only for Flute and Guitar / URANIA RECORDS LDV 14006
- Prague Symphony Orchestra, Jiří Kout (2012) / Symphony No 1, Con le campane / FOK 0005
- Kateřina Englichová – Fire Dance (2009) / Mysterium druidum for Harp and Strings / ArcoDiva UP 0116
- Puella trio – Fiala Bodorová Eben (2009) / Megiddo per violino, violoncello e pianoforte / ArcoDiva UP 0114
- Štefan Margita JA RA LAJ (2009) / JA RA LAJ – Suite on folk motives and texts – 27 Slovak, Balkan and Roma songs / ArcoDiva UP 0110
- Carmina lucemburgiana (2009) / Carmina lucemburgiana for Strings "To the memory of John the Blind" / ArcoDiva UP 0113
- Quattro plays Quattro (2008) / Bern concerto, Concerto dei fiori / ArcoDiva UP 0100
- Miroslav Ambroš violin Zuzana Ambrošová piano Il virtuoso (2006) / Dža more / ArcoDiva UP 0089
- Works for Violin and Piano Jiří Gemrot Sylvie Bodorová - Concerto dei fiori per violino e pianoforte Miroslav Kubička Petr Janda Silvie Hessová – violin Daniel Wiesner - piano (2006) Cube Bohemia CBCD 2632
- Štefan Margita Tears and smiles Mikuláš Schneider-Trnavský Slovak Songs (2006) includes Sadaj, slnko, sadaj – Seven Slovak Songs / ArcoDiva UP 0084
- Gabriela Beňačková From the Heart. Mikuláš Schneider-Trnavský Slovak Songs (2006) included Sadaj, slnko, sadaj – Seven Slovak Songs / ArcoDiva UP 0001
- Never broken (2004) / Terezín Ghetto Requiem / Center Stage Records
- Juda Maccabeus (2004) ArcoDiva UP 0065
- Ronald Stevenson String Quartets– Sylvie Bodorova – Terezín Ghetto Requiem, Conciero de Estío. Nigel Cliffe - Baritone María Isabel Siewers - Guitar Martinu Quartet (Lubomír Havlak, Petr Matejak, Jan Jisa, Jitka Vlasankova) ArcoDiva UP 0052 (2003)
- Jitka Hosprova viola Rhapsody Bodorova: Gila Rome (2002) ArcoDiva UP 0043
- Prague String Quartets (2001) / Shofarot / ArcoDiva UP 0044
- A Paganini Compositions for solo violin Milstein, Kreisler, Schnittke, Ernst, Bodorova Dža more, Bach Pavel Sporcl violin (1999) ArcoDiva UP 0010
- Protokol XX – Sylvie Bodorová (1997) / Pontem video, Plankty, Dignitas homini Prague Chambre Philharmonic/ Panton
- Prague Guitar Concertos (1996) / Tre canzoni da suonare, Dona nobis lucem / Supraphon
- María Isabel Siewers Amigos (1994) / Sostar mange – Gypsy Balad for guitar / Aurophon
