= Viktor Mácha =

Czech photographer

- Born: 1984 (age 41–42); Prague, Czechoslovakia
- Occupation: photographer

Viktor Mácha (born 1984) is a Czech photographer specializing in industrial photography and architectural photography. He has been working on the project The Beauty of Steel, within which he aims to document heavy industry and industrial landscapes around the world.

== Life and work ==
He was born in Prague and is the grandson of composer Otmar Mácha. He studied theology and religious studies at Charles University. He became interested in photographing heavy industry during his teenage years; a key influence was his encounter with the Třinec Iron and Steel Works, which he later described as a defining life experience.

Since 2006, he has been traveling worldwide at his own expense, documenting industrial operations, especially steel production and related technologies. He primarily photographs active heavy industry sites such as blast furnaces, steel mills, rolling mills, and coke ovens. His work is predominantly documentary in nature and focuses on technological processes as well as working environments. He concentrates on capturing operations that are gradually disappearing or undergoing major transformation in many regions. He has photographed hundreds of industrial sites in more than thirty-seven countries, including the Ukrainian Azovstal.

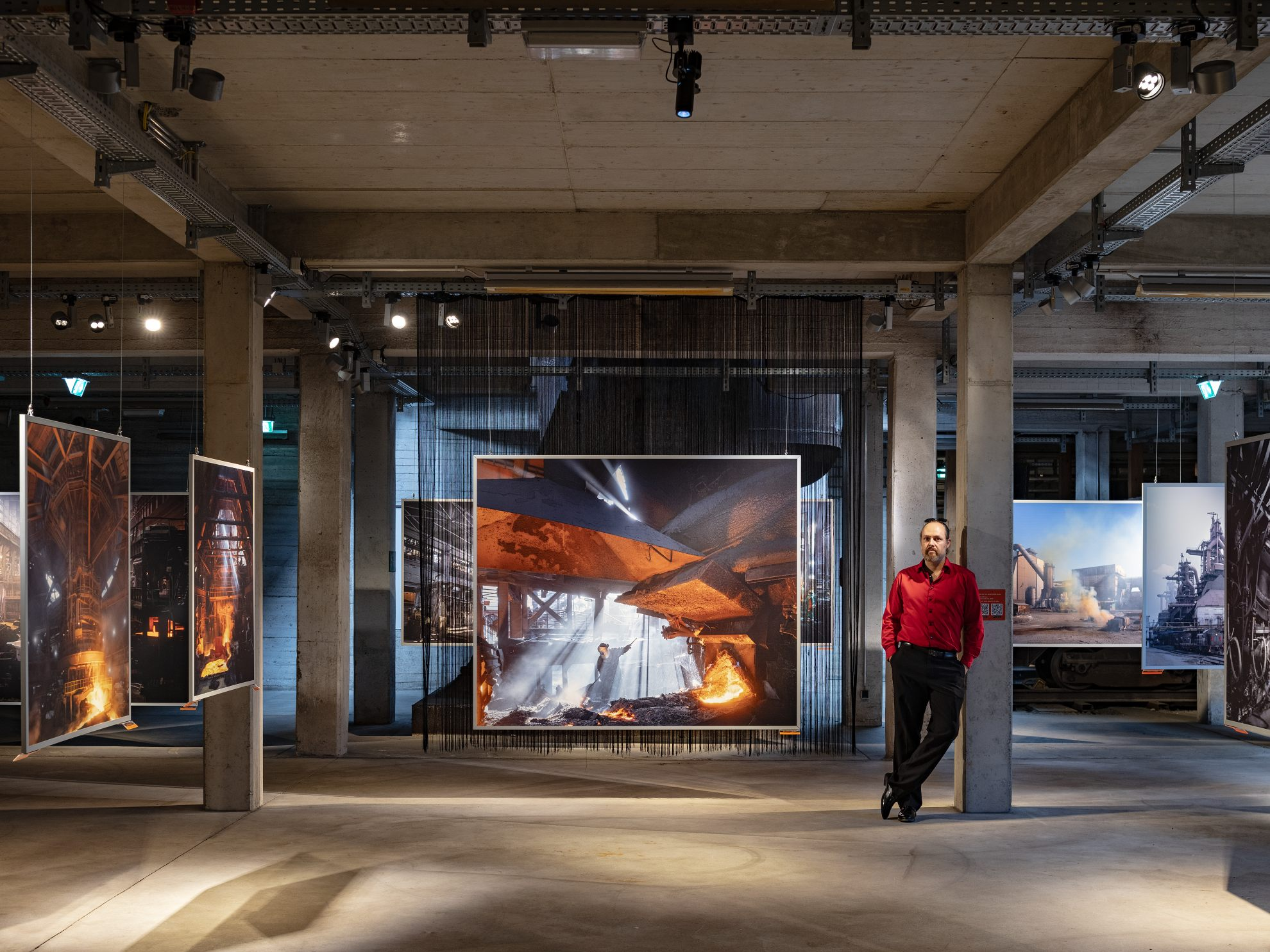
The Beauty of Steel exhibition at the LWL Industrial Museum Henrichshütte Hattingen, Germany, 2025

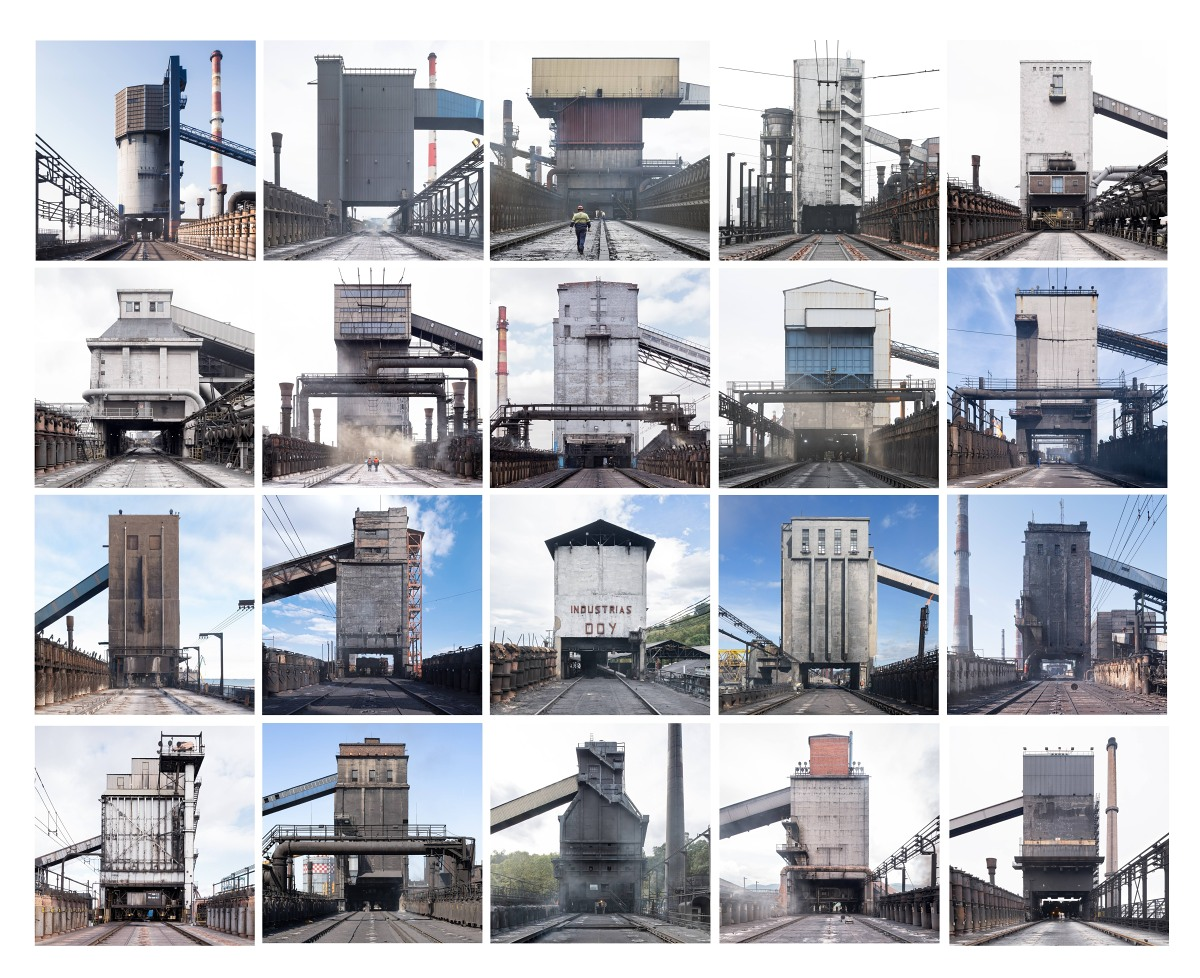
Typology of coal bunkers, 2015–2025

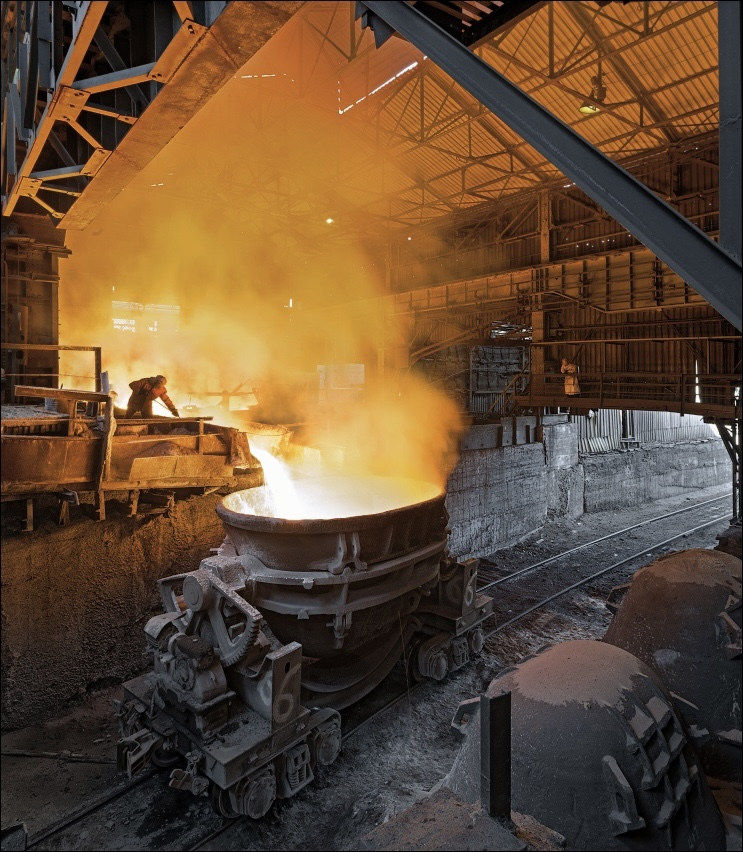
Satkinsky ironworks, April 2013

== Exhibitions ==
=== Solo exhibitions ===
- 2025 – The Beauty of Steel, Industriemuseum Brandenburg an der Havel, Germany
- 2025 – The Beauty of Steel, LWL-Museum Henrichshütte, Hattingen, Germany
- 2024 – The Mills, Zabytkowa Kopalnia Ignacy, Radlin, Poland
- 2024 – The Mills, Ferdinand Colonnade, Mariánské Lázně
- 2024 – The Mills, Cross Club Café, Prague
- 2023 – The Mills, Jiří Mahen Library, Brno
- 2022 – Železiarne, srdce priemyslu, Košice, Slovakia
- 2022 – Huty, Museum of Metallurgy, Chorzów, Poland
- 2021 – The Mills, Centrul de Cultură Urbană Turnul Croitorilor, Cluj-Napoca, Romania
- 2021 – The Mills, Muzeul Cineastului Amator, Reșița, Romania
- 2021 – Industriekultur, Haus der Fotografie, Husum, Germany
- 2021 – Krajiny práce, Ostrava
- 2020 – The Mills, Prague
- 2019 – The Mills, Prague; Ostrava; Brno
- 2018 – The Mills, Ostrava; Vinařice; Prague

=== Group exhibitions ===
- 2023 – Žofín Ironworks in Moravian Ostrava 1873–1972, Ostrava
- 2022 – 1st Auction Art and Photo Salon, Prague
- 2020 – Workers Die But Work Lives On', Gallery of Fine Arts, Ostrava
- 2017 – HOYM Industry Festival, Poland
- 2016 – Industrial Photography Festival, Poland
- 2016 – Industrial Sights, Prague
- 2016 – Et Cetera, Galerie 1, Prague
- 2014 – Industrial Topography / Architecture of Conversions, Czech Republic 2005–2015, Jaroslav Fragner Gallery, Prague
- 2009 – INDUSTRIALife, Ostrava
- 2009 – 170 Years of Třinec Ironworks, Třinec
- 2009 – Vestiges of Industry, Prague

== Publications ==
- Železo v krvi: ťažký priemysel východného bloku (Čierne diery, Bratislava 2025, ISBN 9788069103030)
