= Orchestral Works by Tomas Svoboda =

2003 album by the Oregon Symphony

Studio album by Oregon Symphony
- Released: July 2003
- Recorded: January 9–10; June 13, 2000
- Venue: Arlene Schnitzer Concert Hall, Portland, Oregon
- Genre: Classical
- Length: 70:59
- Label: Albany
- Producer: Executive: Peter Kermani, Susan Bush, Mark B. Rulison; Recording: Blanton Alspaugh

Oregon Symphony chronology
American Contrasts (2003)	Orchestral Works by Tomas Svoboda (2003)	Shostakovich: Symphony No. 11 "The Year 1905" (2003)

Orchestral Works by Tomas Svoboda (sometimes abridged as Orchestral Works) is a classical music album by the Oregon Symphony under the artistic direction of James DePreist, released by the record label Albany in 2003. The album was recorded at the Arlene Schnitzer Concert Hall in Portland, Oregon during three performances in January and June 2000. It contains three works by Tomáš Svoboda, a Czech-American composer who taught at Portland State University for more than 25 years: Overture of the Season, Op. 89; Concerto for Marimba and Orchestra, Op. 148; and Symphony No. 1 (of Nature), Op. 20. The album's executive producers were Peter Kermani, Susan Bush, and Mark B. Rulison; Blanton Alspaugh served as the recording producer.

Overture of the Season and Concerto for Marimba and Orchestra were commissioned by the Oregon Symphony. The latter was dedicated to principal percussionist Niel DePonte, who encouraged Svoboda to compose the work and who is featured on marimba; it was the first concerto commissioned by the orchestra for one of its musicians. Though the album received a mixed critical reception, DePonte's performance earned him a Grammy Award nomination for Best Instrumental Soloist Performance with Orchestra. Selected tracks from the album have been broadcast by classical music radio stations throughout the United States.

== Background and composition ==
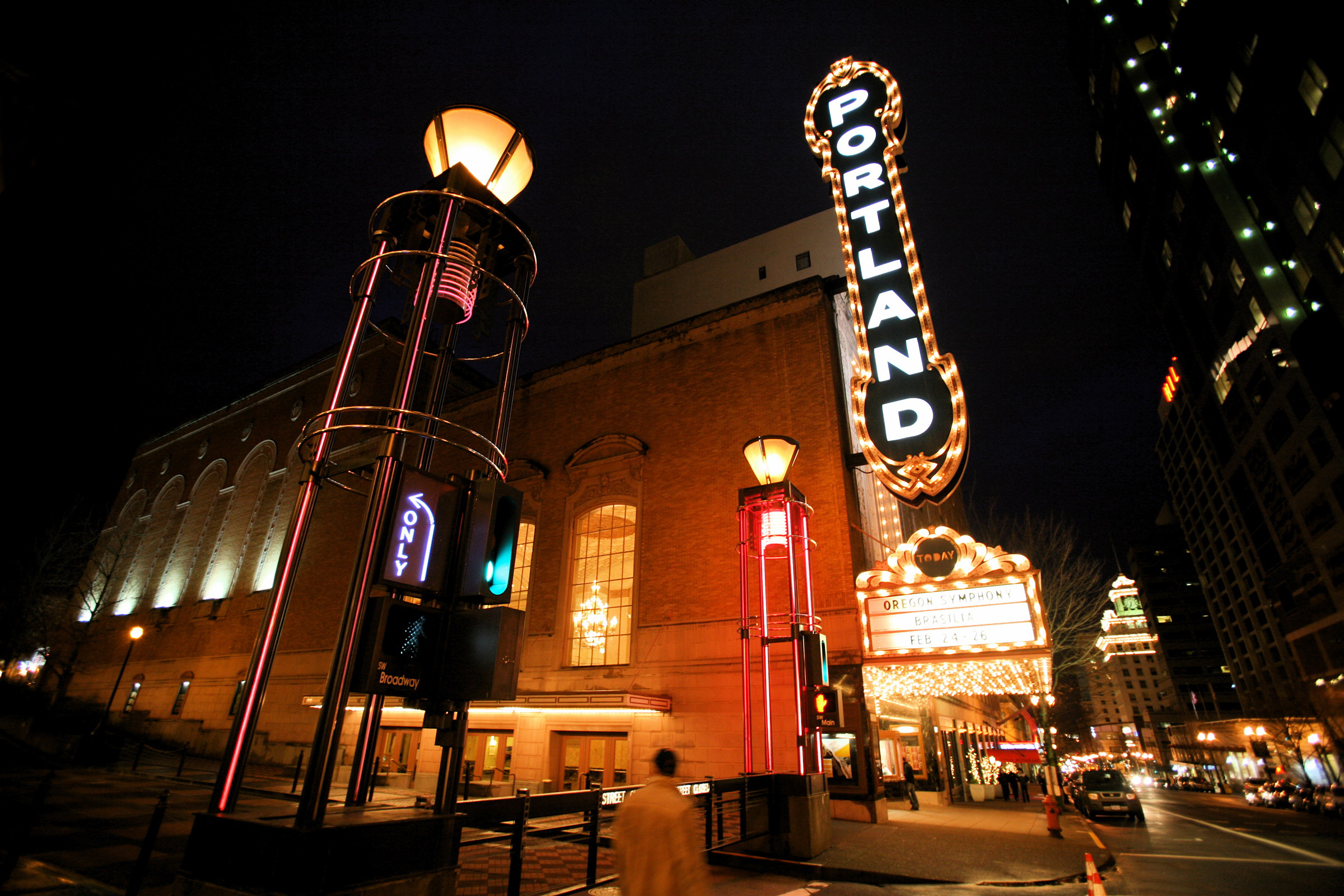
The album was recorded at the Arlene Schnitzer Concert Hall.

Orchestral Works by Tomas Svoboda, released by Albany Records in July 2003, was recorded under the artistic direction of James DePreist and contains three works by Czech-American composer Tomáš Svoboda: Overture of the Season, Op. 89; Concerto for Marimba and Orchestra, Op. 148; and Symphony No. 1 (of Nature), Op. 20. Svoboda has been regarded as Oregon's "most prolific and performed" classical composer. Following his education at the Prague Conservatory (1954–1962), the Academy of Music in Prague (1962–1964) and the University of Southern California (1966–1969), Svoboda taught composition and music theory at Portland State University for more than 25 years.

Overture of the Season and Concerto for Marimba and Orchestra were recorded at the Arlene Schnitzer Concert Hall in downtown Portland on January 9–10, 2000; Symphony No. 1 was recorded at the same venue on June 13, 2000. Concerto for Marimba and Orchestra features principal percussionist Niel DePonte, who joined the orchestra in 1977 at age 24, on marimba. Peter Kermani, Susan Bush and Mark B. Rulison served as the album's executive producers. Blanton Alspaugh served as the recording producer. John Newton was the recording engineer, and mastering was conducted by Mark Donahue. Svoboda is credited for the album's cover art. The album's liner notes also credit Wendy Leher, Pavlina Honcova-Summers and Henry Hillman for photography, and Dave McLaughlin for graphic design. Mixing console mastering occurred at Soundmirror, based in Massachusetts.

The recording was funded by Mary Ausplund Tooze, a longtime philanthropist and patron of Portland's arts community, who specifically requested the inclusion of Concerto for Marimba and Orchestra for being a "good, solid piece and one you find out more about each time you hear it". Tooze considered the concerto the "real star" of the recording.

=== Works ===
Overture of the Season was commissioned by the Oregon Symphony for its 83rd season; the work's world premiere was presented by the orchestra on October 7, 1978. In 1994, the classical music writer for Philadelphia Daily News said the composition had been performed by 55 orchestras within the three previous seasons. According to Svoboda's website, as of May 2013 the work has been performed 270 times by 141 orchestras, under the direction of 93 conductors. The "festive" overture, which is approximately eight minutes in length, employs flutes, piccolo, oboes, clarinets, bassoons, horns, trumpets, trombones, tuba, timpani, percussion, and strings.

Concerto for Marimba and Orchestra was commissioned by the orchestra in 1993 in conjunction with its centennial celebration. It features solo marimba and a "keyboard" quintet (piano, harp, celeste, orchestra bells and crotales), with parts for flutes, piccolo, oboes, clarinets, bassoons, horns, trumpets, trombones, tuba, timpani, and strings. According to Svoboda, the work took a year to compose and marks the first concerto commissioned by the Oregon Symphony for one of its musicians. Concerto for Marimba and Orchestra is dedicated to DePonte, who encouraged Svoboda to compose a marimba concerto. For the album's liner notes, Svoboda wrote:

"My approach to this work is to expose the beauty of the marimba. The gentle and majestic sounds found in the instrumental mixture within the orchestra is always respectful of the somewhat limited powers of projection of the solo instrument. Overall the concerto is stylistically lyrical and neo-romantic. The energy and vitality of the marimba is highlighted through the rhythmic vitality of the composition, while marimba's warm and resonant sound, emanating from its rosewood keyboard, is ideally suited for the lyrical sections of the piece."

When the concerto is performed, according to Svoboda, instruments on stage are separated into three contrasting sections: the solo marimba, the quintet, and the remainder of the orchestra. The quintet is placed near the conductor and solo marimba, "which is the prominent voice of this uncommon ensemble". The composition contains several instances where the quintet plays for extended periods, referred to as "islands" by Svoboda, which create "concerto grosso-like interplay" with the orchestra.

Symphony No. 1 was completed in 1956 and premiered in Prague on September 7, 1957. Inspired by Svoboda's exposure to nature within a pastoral setting, the composition was commissioned anonymously 25 years later (1982), providing Svoboda an opportunity to make revisions. The work was influenced by Ludwig van Beethoven, Antonín Dvořák, and Pyotr Ilyich Tchaikovsky; it features polyphonic textures and asymmetrical and harmonic rhythmic elements. The symphony consists of four movements: "Moderato", "Presto", "Andante", and "Allegro – Moderato". The first, considered a chorale, is in the key of C-sharp minor and features a theme performed by flute. The second movement, a scherzo, features a "quick, motoric" triple rhythm and meter. The third is a pastorale that highlights the woodwind section and incorporates a piece called "The Bird", composed by Svoboda in 1949 at age nine. The final movement, a rondo, was influenced by Czech folk music and mixes themes supplied by earlier movements.

== Reception and broadcasts ==
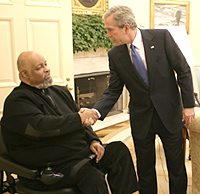
The Oregon Symphony was conducted by James DePreist, pictured in 2005 with President George W. Bush after receiving the National Medal of Arts.

The album received a mixed reception. Blair Sanderson of AllMusic found Svoboda's compositions to be imitative, specifically comparing Overture of the Season to work by Leoš Janáček and Symphony No. 1 to "equal parts" of Hugo Alfvén and Jean Sibelius, with "just a dash" of Carl Nielsen. Sanderson criticized the harmonic language of Concerto for Marimba and Orchestra and found DePonte's performance to be admirable but "weakly planned". Similarly, Robert Dettmer of Classical CD Review found Svoboda's work to be derivative and "expressively sterile", and "no more engaging than any other marimba concerto". However, Dettmer acknowledged that the marimba was one of his least favorite solo instruments. Dettmer wrote that DePriest "serves the composer dutifully, but not as enliveningly as one might have expected".

For his marimba performance, DePonte earned a Grammy Award nomination for Best Instrumental Soloist Performance with Orchestra, the first time that the Oregon Symphony or any of its musicians had been recognized by the Recording Academy. Following the announcement, DePonte admitted that he was surprised by the nomination and had not felt similar emotions since learning of his invitation to join the orchestra 26 years earlier: "I am completely overwhelmed. I had no idea the recording had been submitted." DePriest said: "The credit goes to Mary Tooze for making the recording possible, to Niel for his fine playing and to Tomas for writing such a wonderful piece. I am thrilled for everyone concerned." Svoboda said of the nomination: "The prestige goes to the orchestra. This is a great moment for our symphony." The Oregon Symphony's director of public relations commented: "The running joke is that forever more, the name of this organization is 'The Grammy-nominated Oregon Symphony Orchestra.' The Grammy acknowledgment is recognized as a mark of great artistic achievement. To be nominated is about as good as it gets."

Selected tracks from the album have been broadcast by classical music radio stations. Concerto for Marimba and Orchestra was aired by WFMT (Chicago) in March 2012, WWFM (Trenton, New Jersey) in September 2013, and KUAF (Fayetteville, Arkansas) in November 2013. Symphony No. 1 was broadcast by Interlochen Public Radio in August 2012 and by WRTI (Philadelphia) in November 2013. WNYC (New York City) has aired the marimba concerto and Symphony No. 1 as recently as January 2011 and January 2014, respectively.

== Track listing ==
All works by Tomáš Svoboda.

1. Overture of the Season, Op. 89 – 8:42

Concerto for Marimba and Orchestra, Op. 148

2. "Con moto" – 8:48
3. "Adagio" – 8:08
4. "Vivace" – 8:39

Symphony No. 1 (of Nature), Op. 20

5. "Moderato" – 10:08
6. "Presto" – 8:13
7. "Andante" – 6:56
8. "Allegro – Moderato" – 10:18

Track listing adapted from the album's liner notes.

== Personnel ==
- Blanton Alspaugh – producer
- Susan Bush – executive producer
- Niel DePonte – marimba
- James DePreist – conductor
- Mark Donahue – mastering
- Henry Hillman – photography
- Pavlina Honcova-Summers – photography
- Peter Kermani – executive producer
- Wendy Lehrer – photography
- Dave McLaughlin – graphic design
- John Newton – engineer
- Oregon Symphony – orchestra
- Mark B. Rulison – executive producer
- Tomás Svoboda – composer, cover photo

Credits adapted from AllMusic.

=== Orchestra roster ===
- Clarisse Atcherson – first violin
- Aida Baker – first violin
- Kenneth Baldwin – assistant principal bass
- David Bamonte – trumpet
- Joēl Belgique – principal viola
- Joseph Berger – associate principal horn
- Heather Blackburn – second violin***
- Ronald Blessinger – first violin
- Naomi Blumberg – cello
- David Brubaker – first violin
- Pansy Chang – cello
- JáTtik Clark – principal tuba
- Julie Coleman – second violin
- Robin Cook – first violin*
- John Cox – principal horn
- Jennifer Craig – principal harp
- Dolores D'Aigle – assistant principal second violin
- Dan Alan Danielson – second violin****
- Juan de Gomar – bassoon, contrabassoon
- Eileen Deiss – first violin
- Niel DePonte – principal percussion
- Frank Diliberto – principal bass
- Jonathan Dubay – first violin
- Cheri Ann Egbers – clarinet
- Mark Eubanks – principal bassoon
- Daniel Ge Feng – second violin
- Kenneth Finch – cello
- Lynne Finch – second violin
- Kathleen Follett – first violin*
- Michael Foxman – concertmaster, first violin
- Leah Frajola – second violin
- Peter Frajola – associate concertmaster, first violin
- Katherine George – principal keyboard
- Mary Grant – horn
- Kathryn Gray – first violin
- Paloma Griffin – assistant concertmaster, first violin
- Lisa Hansen – second violin
- Philip Neil Hatler – trombone*
- Donald Hermanns – bass
- John Hubbard – second violin***
- Denise Huizenga – second violin****
- Gyrid Hyde-Towle – second violin
- Marty Jennings – first violin***
- Jeffrey Johnson – bass
- Lawrence Johnson – assistant principal horn
- Mary Ann Coggins Kaza – first violin
- Bridget Kelly – cello
- Frederick Korman – principal oboe
- Sally Kuhns – assistant principal trumpet
- Todd Kuhns – clarinet, E-flat clarinet/bass clarinet
- Eileen Lande – second violin
- Steve Lawrence – percussion
- Ann Leeder-Beesley – second violin
- Nancy Lochner – viola
- Marlene Majovski – first violin
- Virginia McCarthy – second violin
- Stephanie McDougal – cello
- Patricia Miller – viola
- Robert Naglee – bassoon
- Yoshinori Nakao – principal clarinet
- Charles Noble – assistant principal viola
- Gayle Budd O'Grady – cello
- William Ofstad – bass
- Harris Orem – English horn, oboe
- Barton Parker – horn
- Christine Perry – percussion
- Jeffrey Peyton – percussion***
- Alan Pierce – bass trombone, trombone
- Deloris Plum – cello
- Stephen Price – viola
- Brian Quincey – viola
- Paul Salvatore – principal timpani
- Fred Sautter – principal trumpet
- Anna Schaum – viola
- Jason Schooler – bass
- Timothy Scott – cello
- Burke Shaw – bass
- Michael Sigell – second violin
- Deborah Singer – first violin
- David Socolofsky – assistant principal cello
- Rachel Sokolow – first violin
- Tomáš Svoboda – keyboard
- Peggy Swafford – viola
- Chien Tan – principal second violin
- Margo Tatgenhorst – principal cello
- Robert Taylor – principal trombone
- Tommy Thompson – bass
- Karen Wagner – oboe
- Martha Warrington – viola
- Dawn Weiss – principal flute
- Connie Whelan – viola
- Leo Whitlow – viola*
- Carol Williams – horn***
- Carla Wilson – piccolo

Orchestra roster adapted from the album's liner notes.

"*" designates acting orchestra members; "**" designates musicians on a leave of absence; "***" designates extra musicians; "****" designates contract musicians.

== See also ==
- 2003 in classical music
- List of compositions by Tomáš Svoboda
