= Ladislav Vycpálek =

Czech composer (1882–1969)

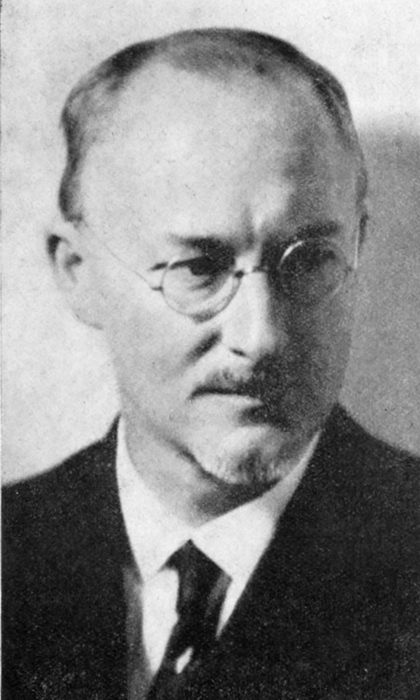
Vycpálek before 1931

Ladislav Vycpálek (23 February 1882 – 9 January 1969) was a Czech composer and violist.

== Life ==
Vycpálek was born on 23 February 1882 in Vršovice (today a part of Prague). studied composition under Vítězslav Novák. However, he very soon found his own expressive style. He mainly composed vocal and choral works. Prior to World War I, he occupied himself with setting Czech and German symbolist poetry to music, then he drew inspiration from folk poetry. After the war, he turned towards a more humanistic philosophical reflection, creating three well-known cantatas: Cantata of the Last Things of Man (Kantáta o posledních věcech člověka, 1920–22), Blessed Be Man (Blahoslavený člověk ten, 1933), and the Czech Requiem (České requiem, 1940).

Vycpálek died on 9 January 1969 in Prague.

== Selected works ==
Orchestral

- Dívka z Lochroyanu (The Maid of Lochroyan), Melodrama on an Old Scotch Ballad for narrator and orchestra (or piano), Op. 2 (1907, revised 1911); Czech translation by Ladislav Quis
- Vzhůru srdce (Sursum corda; Courage, My Heart!), 2 Fantasy Variations on Hussite Church Tunes, Op. 30 (1950)

Chamber music

- String Quartet in C major, Op. 3 (1909)
- Chvála houslí (In Praise of the Violin), Sonata in D in the Form of Variations for violin, piano and mezzo-soprano, Op. 19 (1927–1928)
- Duo for violin and viola, Op. 20 (1929)
- Suita pro sólovou violu (Suite for Solo Viola), Op. 21 (1929)
- Suita pro sólové housle (Suite for Solo Violin), Op. 22 (1930)
- Sonatina for violin and piano, Op. 26 (1947)
- Con moto for violin and piano (1965)

Piano

- Cestou (On the Way; On the Path), 6 Miniatures, Op. 9 (1911–1914)

1. Menuet
2. Polka
3. Ukolébavka (Lullaby)
4. Praeludium
5. Fughetta
6. Epilog

- Doma: nenáročná suita o nenáročné rodině (At Home: A Simple Suite for a Simple Family), Op. 38 (1959)

Vocal

- Tichá usmíření (Silent Reconciliation; Quiet Conciliation), 4 Songs for voice and piano, Op. 1 (1908–1909)

1. Anemone
2. Tuberosy
3. Žluté květy
4. Sentimentální rozhovor

- Světla v temnotách (Lights in the Darkness), 3 Songs for voice and piano, Op. 4 (1910); words by Antonín Sova
- Tuchy a vidiny (Anticipations and Visions), 5 Songs for voice and piano, Op. 5 (1910–1911); words by Alfred Mombert

1. Ukolébavka
2. Zimní večer
3. Moře
4. Mír
5. Slunce

- Slavnosti života (Celebration of Life), Cycle of 4 Songs for medium voice and piano, Op. 8 (1912–1913); words by Richard Dehmel
- Z Moravy (From Moravia), 7 Folk Songs for voice and piano, Op. 11a (1910–1914)

1. Zavíraj, Anko
2. Prečo sa, dzievčence, něvydáce?
3. Ani sem si bičíčka
4. Chodzila po lesi
5. Keď sa Slovák
6. Jakú sem si frajírenku
7. Mamko, moja mamko

- Moravské ballady (Moravian Ballads) for medium voice and piano, Op. 12 (1915)

1. Vydala mati, vydala céru
2. Putovali hudci
3. Vandroval mladzěněc
4. Byla jedna byla
5. Stójí Jano při potoce

- Vojna (War), Cycle of 10 Moravian Folk Songs for voice and piano, Op. 13 (1915)

1. Rakúský císař pán
2. Keď já pójdzem
3. Ach dybys ty věděla
4. Tatíčku můj starý
5. Vojaček idzě
6. Belegrad, Belegrad, turecké pomezí
7. Tá moja mamička
8. Na trávničku na zeleném
9. Belegrad, Belegrad, ta turecká skala
10. V městě Holomúci

- V boží dlani (In God's Hands), Cycle of 4 Songs for medium voice and piano, Op. 14 (1916); words by Valery Bryusov in translation by Petr Křička

1. Hlídka
2. Věk za věkem
3. Myši
4. Narození Páně

- Probuzení (Awakening), 2 Songs for soprano and orchestra, Op. 17 (1926); words by Karel Toman and the composer

1. Březen (March)
2. Modlitba na cestu životem (Prayer for Life's Journey)

- Na rozloučenou (At Parting), 6 Mourning Songs for voice and piano, Op. 25 (1945)

1. Rozpomeň se
2. Pevně dřímáš
3. Ejhle všickni vidíme
4. Za mrtvými
5. Člověk, zrozený z ženy
6. Jako poutník

Choral

- Tři smíšené sbory (3 Mixed Choruses), Op. 6 (1911–1912); words by Otokar Březina, Richard Dehmel and Johann Wolfgang von Goethe

1. Magické půlnoci
2. Chvalozpěv
3. Svůj chléb kdo jídal

- Čtyři mužské sbory (4 Male Choruses), Op. 7; words by Otokar Březina, Otakar Theer and Richard Dehmel

1. Zem?
2. Oheň
3. U moře
4. Píseň žatvy

- Tuláci (The Vagabonds) for male chorus and woodwind ensemble (flute, oboe, 2 clarinets, English horn, 2 bassoons) ad libitum, Op. 10 (1914); words by Karel Toman
- Tři sbory (3 Choruses), Op. 11b

1. Sirotek (The Orphan), Folk Song for mixed chorus and strings (3 violas and cello), or for mixed chorus and cello (1914, revised 1917–1918)
2. Stojí hruška v oudolí, Folk Song for female chorus and piano (1915)
3. Majolenka (The Beauty), Folk Song for male chorus a cappella (1915)

- Dvě sbory (2 Choruses), Op. 15 (1918); words by Pablo Neruda

1. Naše jaro (Our Spring) for mixed chorus a cappella
2. Boj nynějši (The Present Fight) for male chorus a cappella

- Kantáta o posledních věcech člověka (The Last Things of Man; Cantata of the Last Things of Man; Cantata on the Final Days of Mankind), Cantata for soprano, bass, chorus and orchestra, Op. 16 (1920–1922)
- In Memoriam (5. III. 1924), 3 Male Choruses (a cappella), Op. 18 (1925); words by Jaroslav Vrchlický, Michelangelo and Otakar Theer
- Blahoslavený ten člověk (Blessed Be Man), Cantata for soloists, chorus and orchestra, Op. 23 (1933); words from the Book of Psalms
- České requiem: Smrt a spasení (Czech Requiem: Death and Redemption) for soprano, alto, baritone, chorus and orchestra, Op. 24 (1940)
- From the Czech Homeland for mixed chorus a cappella, Op. 29 (1949)
- Out of the Depths for mixed chorus a cappella, Op. 31 (1950)
- Červenec (July) for mixed chorus a cappella, Op. 32 (1951, revised 1953); words by Karel Toman
- Září (August) for mixed chorus a cappella, Op. 33 (1951, revised 1953); words by Karel Toman
- Marná Láska (Vain Love), 5 Songs for female chorus a cappella, Op. 34 (1954)
- Dvě dvojzpěvy (2 Duets) for female chorus and chamber orchestra, Op. 35 (1956)

1. Hvězdička
2. Kalina

- Svatý Lukáš, Maléř Boží (Saint Luke) for female chorus and chamber orchestra, Op. 36 (1956)
- Bezručův hlas (The Voice of Bezruč), 3 Male Choruses, Op. 37 (1958)
- A Clumsy Fellow for female chorus and piano, Op. 39 (1960–1961)
- Oh Love! for mixed chorus a cappella, Op. 40 (1961–1962)
- Czech Songs for female chorus and piano, Op. 41 (1961–1962)

== Discography ==
- Karel Ančerl Gold Edition, Vol. 21: Czech Requiem, Op. 24 – Mariana Řeháková (soprano); Marie Mrázová (alto); Theodor Šrubař (baritone); Karel Ančerl (conductor); Czech Philharmonic Orchestra; recorded 1968; Supraphon SU 3681-2 212 (1970, 1992, 2003)
- Karel Ančerl Gold Edition, Vol. 35: Cantata of the Last Things of Man, Op. 16 – Drahomíra Tikalová (soprano); Ladislav Mráz (baritone); Karel Ančerl (conductor); Czech Philharmonic Orchestra; Prague Philharmonic Chorus; recorded 1957; Supraphon SU 3695-2 901 (1959, 1970, 2004)
- Czech Mates – Duo for Violin and Viola, Op. 20 – Duo Patterson: Ronald Patterson (violin), Roxanna Patterson (viola); Ante Aeternum Records (2004)
- Monologue – Suite for Solo Viola, Op. 21 – Jitka Hosprová (viola); Supraphon SU 4049-2 131 (2003)
- Soňa Červená: Pěvecký portrét – Sonata in D "Chvála houslí" for violin, piano and mezzo-soprano, Op. 19 – Soňa Červená (mezzo-soprano); Spytihněv Šorm (violin); Alfred Holeček (piano); recorded 1960s; SU 3851-2 201 (2005)
- Soudobá houslová tvorba (Contemporary Works for Violin): Sonatina, Op. 26 and Con moto – Břetislav Ludvík (violin); Josef Hála (piano); recorded 1971; Panton (1972)
