= Tomáš Svoboda (composer) =

Czech-American composer and pianist (1939–2022)

- Born: Tomáš Svoboda; December 6, 1939; Paris, France
- Died: November 17, 2022 (aged 82) Portland, Oregon, U.S.
- Genres: contemporary classical
- Occupations: Composer, pianist
- Instruments: Piano, percussion
- Years active: 57
- Labels: North Pacific Music, Albany, Artisie 4, Centaur, Innova, Crystal, First Edition
- Website: Official website of Tomáš Svoboda

Tomáš Svoboda (December 6, 1939 – November 17, 2022) was a French-born Czech-American contemporary classical composer and pianist, whose debut took place in Prague, Czechoslovakia on September 7, 1957, with the world premiere of his Symphony No. 1 (Of Nature) with the FOK Prague Symphony conducted by Václav Smetáček. Svoboda's catalog contains over 200 compositions, including six symphonies and five concerti. His music is performed worldwide and recordings of more than 50 works have now been released. Svoboda's Piano Trios CD recording received a 2001 "Critics Choice Award" from the American Record Guide and his Marimba Concerto received recognition in a 2003 Grammy Award nomination for the Oregon Symphony.

== Biography ==
Svoboda was born in Paris, France. A Professor Emeritus from Portland State University, Svoboda composed his first music at age nine. He was a professor at PSU for 27 years. There have been over 1,200 performances of his music.

Svoboda died in Portland, Oregon on November 17, 2022, at the age of 82. He had suffered a major stroke in 2012.

== Selected recordings ==
- Children's Treasure Box, Vols. 1-4, for Piano, North Pacific Music (NPM LD 026), Recording by Tomas Svoboda.
- Chamber Works, Vol. 1, With Clarinet, North Pacific Music (NPM LD 016), Recording by members of Oregon Festival of American Music & Tomas Svoboda.
- Four Visions, Music for 1, 2 & 3 Pianos, North Pacific Music (NPM LD 013), Recording by Daniel Wiesner, David Svec & Tomas Svoboda.
- Nine Etudes in Fugue Style, Vols. 1 & 2, for Piano, North Pacific Music (NPM LD 015), Recording by Tomas Svoboda.
- Orchestral Works by Tomas Svoboda, Albany Records: Troy 604, Recording by the Oregon Symphony.
- Piano Concertos, Artisie 4 Recordings, (1006), Recording by the Dayton Philharmonic.
- Piano Trios, North Pacific Music (NPM LD 008), Recording by Lubomír Havlák, Jitka Vasankova & Tomáš Svoboda.
- Piano Works, Vol. 1, for Piano, North Pacific Music (NPM LD 006), Recording by Tomáš Svoboda.
- String Quartets, Vols.1 and 2, North Pacific Music (NPM LD 022), Recording by the Martinů Quartet.
