= Czech Requiem =

Cantata by Ladislav Vycpálek

České requiem: Smrt a spasení ("Czech Requiem: Death and Redemption," Op.24) is a 1940 choral cantata for soprano, alto, baritone, chorus and orchestra by Ladislav Vycpálek. It follows on from his earlier choral-cantatas Kantáta o posledních věcech člověka (""Cantata of the Last Things of Man" 1921) and Blahoslavený ten člověk ("Blessed Be The Man," 1933).

== Recordings ==
- Karel Ančerl Gold Edition
