= Karel Ančerl Gold Edition =

Collection of 43 reissued and remastered albums

The Karel Ančerl Gold Edition is the collection of 42 reissued and remastered albums, recorded by Czech conductor Karel Ančerl from 1950 until 1968, when the artist left Czechoslovakia in the wake of the Soviet invasion. The CDs were released by the Supraphon label between 2002 and 2005.

In 2006, this set was awarded the most prestigious prize by Grand Prix du Disque de l'Académie de Charles Cros due to the exceptional artistic and technical level of the classical music recordings. After 2005, Supraphon released the last four discs of the collection, linked as no. 43 of the set.

- Ančerl Gold 1: Bedřich Smetana - Má vlast (Czech Philharmonic), SU 3661-2 011
- Ančerl Gold 2: Antonín Dvořák - Symphony No. 9 "From The New World", In the Nature Realms, Othello Overture (Czech Philharmonic), SU 3662-2 011
- Ančerl Gold 3: Mendelssohn-Bartholdy, Bruch, Berg - Concertos for violin and orchestra (Josef Suk, Czech Philharmonic), SU 3663-2 011
- Ančerl Gold 4: Mussorgsky / Borodin / Rimski-Korsakov - Pictures At An Exhibition, Night on Bald Mountain / In the Steppes of Central Asia / Capriccio Espagnol, SU 3664-2 011
- Ančerl Gold 5: Stravinsky - Petrouchka, The Rite of Spring (Czech Philharmonic), SU 3665-2 011
- Ančerl Gold 6: Mahler / Strauss - Symphony No.1 / Till Eulenspiegel's Merry Pranks (Czech Philharmonic), SU 3666-2 011
- Ančerl Gold 7: Janáček - Glagolitic Mass, Taras Bulba (Czech Philharmonic and choir, soloists), SU 3667-2 911
- Ančerl Gold 8: Antonín Dvořák / Josef Suk - Concerto and Romance for violin and orchestra / Phantasy for violin and orchestra (C.P.Orchestra, J.Suk-violin), SU 3668-2 011
- Ančerl Gold 9 Brahms, J./Beethoven, L.v. Symfonie č. 1 c moll - Symfonie č. 1 C dur/ČF/SU 3669-2 011
- Ančerl Gold 10 Prokofiev, S. Symfonie č. 1 D dur, Koncerty pro klavír a orchestr č. 1 a 2 /S.Richter, FOK/D.Baloghová, ČF/SU 3670-2 011
- Ančerl Gold 11 Miloslav Kabeláč / Jan Hanuš. Mysterium času - Hamletovská improvizace - Koncertantní symfonie /ČF/K.Ančerl SU 3671-2 011
- Ančerl Gold 12 Martinů, B. Koncert pro klavír a orchestr č. 3, Kytice /J.Páleníček, L.Domanínská, S.Červená, ...PFS/J.Kühn, KDS/ČF/SU 3672-2 901
- Ančerl Gold 13 Dvořák - Requiem (Czech Philharmonic, Prague Philharmonic Choir and soloists, 2 CD, SU 3673-2 212
- Ančerl Gold 14 Stravinsky, Oedipus Rex, Žalmová symfonie /PFS/J.Veselka /ČF/SU 3674-2 211
- Ančerl Gold 15 Brahms, J. Koncert pro klavír d moll, Tragická předehra /E.Then-Bergh/ČF/SU 3675-2 001
- Ančerl Gold 16 Prokofjev, S. Romeo a Julie, Péťa a vlk /E.Shilling /ČF/SU 3676-2 011
- Ančerl Gold 17 Ravel, M. /Lalo, E./Hartmann, K.A. Tzigane-Španělská symfonie-Smuteční koncert /I.Haendelová, A.Gertler /ČF/SU 3677-2 011
- Ančerl Gold 18 Mozart, W.A./Voříšek, J.H.V. Koncerty - Symfonie D dur /ČF/SU 3678-2 001
- Ančerl Gold 19 Dvořák, A. Symfonie č. 6 D dur, Můj domov, Husitská, Karneval /ČF/SU 3679-2 011
- Ančerl Gold 20 Tchaikovsky. Koncert pro klavír a orch. b moll, Italské capriccio, Slavnostní předehra /S.Richter/ČF/SU 3680-2 001
- Ančerl Gold 21 Ladislav Vycpálek, Czech Requiem. Otmar Mácha Variations on a Theme and on the Death of Jan Rychlík / M.Řeháková, M.Mrázová, T.Šrubař/ČF/K.Ančerl, 2 CD, SU 3681-2 212
- Ančerl Gold 22 Bartók, B. Koncerty pro housle a orchestr /A.Gertler, E.Bernáthová/ČF/SU 3682-2 011
- Ančerl Gold 23 Shostakovich. Symfonie č. 7 Leningradská/ČF/SU 3683-2 001
- Ančerl Gold 24 Janáček, L./Martinů, B. Sinfonietta - Fresky Piera della Francesca, Paraboly / ČF/SU 3684-2 011
- Ančerl Gold 25 Beethoven, L.van Symfonie č. 5, Koncert pro klavír a orch.č.4, Romance pro housle a orch. č. 2 /J.Páleníček, D.Oistrach/ČF/SU 3685-2 001
- Ančerl Gold 26 Bartók, B. Koncert pro orch., Koncert pro violu a orch. /J.Karlovský/ČF/SU 3686-2 011
- Ančerl Gold 27 Bloch, E. Šelomo / Schumann, R. Koncert pro violocello a orch. / Respighi, O. Adagio con variazioni /A.Navarra/ČF/SU 3687-2 011
- Ančerl Gold 28 Novák, V. V Tatrách / Slavický, K. Moravské taneční fantazie, Rapsodické variace /ČF/SU 3688-2 001
- Ančerl Gold 29 Předehry - Mozart / Beethoven / Wagner / Smetana / Glinka / Berlioz / Rossini / Shostakovich / Weber /ČF/SU 3689-2 011
- Ančerl Gold 30 Hindemith, P. Koncert pro housle a orchestr, Koncert pro violoncello a orchestr / Bořkovec, P. Koncert pro klavír a orchestr č. 2 /A.Gertler, P.Tortelier, A.Jemelík/ČF/SU 3690-2 011
- Ančerl Gold 31 Brahms, J. Dvojkoncert a moll, op. 102, Symfonie č. 2 /J.Suk, A.Navarra, ČF/SU 3691-2 011
- Ančerl Gold 32 Stravinsky. Svatba (Les Noces), Kantáta, Mše /PFS, J.Veselka, ČF/SU 3692-2 211
- Ančerl Gold 33 Mahler, G. Symfonie č. 9 D dur /ČF/SU 3693-2 011
- Ančerl Gold 34 Martinů, B. Symfonie č. 5 a 6 (Symf. fantazie), Památník Lidicím /ČF/SU 3694-2 001
- Ančerl Gold 35 Vycpálek, L. Kantáta o posledních věcech člověka, Ostrčil, O. Suita c moll /sólisté, PFS, P.Kühn /ČF/SU 3695-2 901
- Ančerl Gold 36 Prokofjev, S. Alexandr Něvský. Kantáta, Symfonie - koncert pro violoncello a orch. /V.Soukupová, A.Navarra, PFS, J.Veselka/ČF/SU 3696-2 911
- Ančerl Gold 37 Krejčí, I. Serenáda, Symfonie č. 2 /Pauer, J. Koncert pro fagot /K.Bidlo, ČF/SU 3697-2 001
- Ančerl Gold 38 Mozart, W.A. Koncerty pro klavír K. 488, K. 271, lesní roh K. 447 /H.Czerny-Stefanska, H.Steurer, M.Štefek/ČF/SU 3698-2 001
- Ančerl Gold 39 Shostakovich. Symfonie č. 1 a 5 /ČF/SU 3699-2 011
- Ančerl Gold 40 Jarmil Burghauser. Sedm reliéfů / Dobiáš, V. Symfonie č. 2 / ČF/SU 3700-2 011
- Ančerl Gold 41 Hanuš. Sůl nad zlato, Symfonie č. 2 /ČF/SU 3701-2 001
- Ančerl Gold 42 Liszt, F Preludia / Bárta, L Koncert pro violu / Shostakovich, D. Koncert pro violoncello /J.Karlovský, M.Sádlo, ČF/SU 3702-2 011
- Ančerl Gold 43 Bořkovec, Britten, Dobiáš, Eben, Hurník, Jirko, Kalabis, Kalaš, Kapr, Seidel (Czech Philharmonic), 4 CD, SU 3944-2 011
