= Tučapy (Vyškov District) =

- Municipality
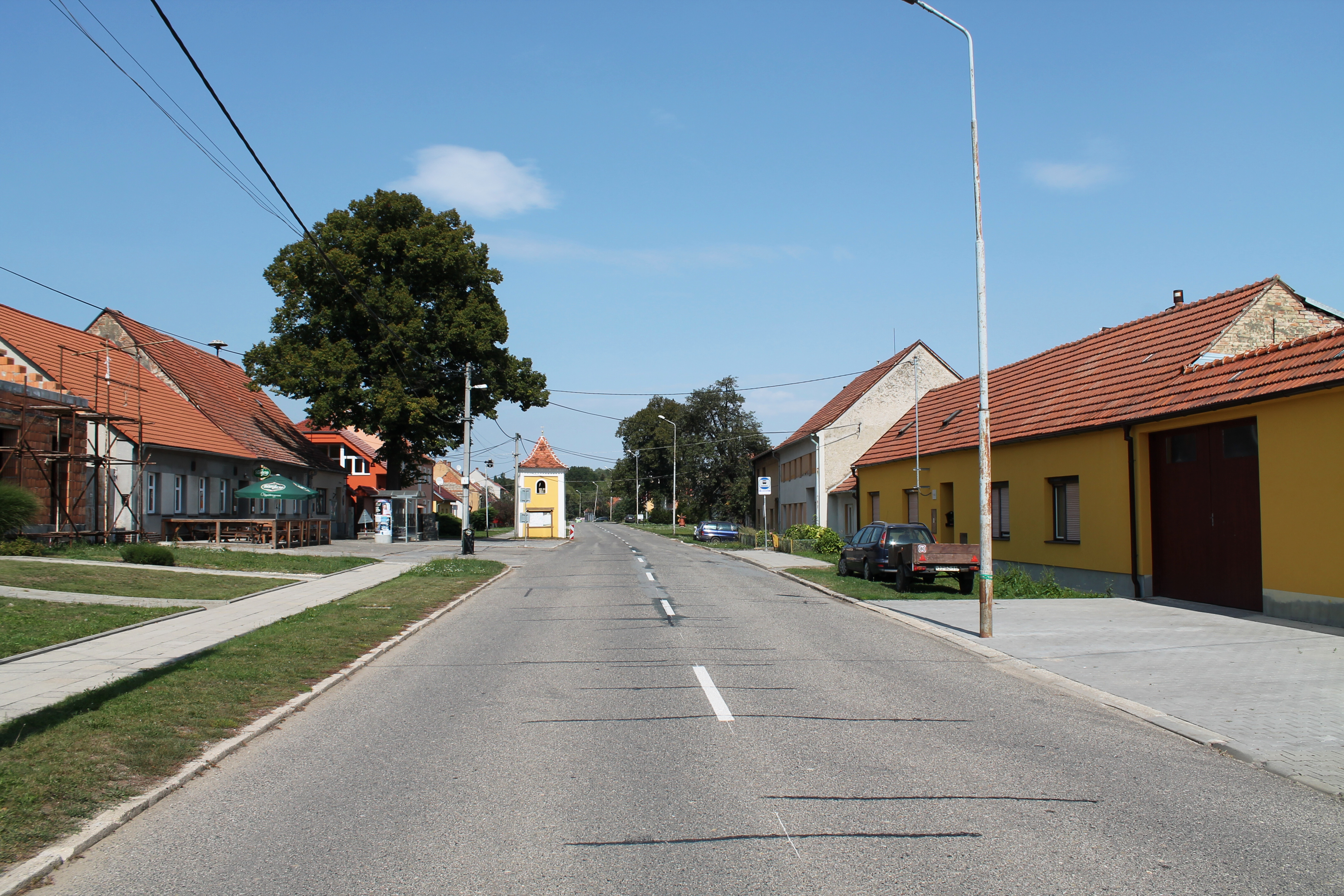
- Centre of Tučapy

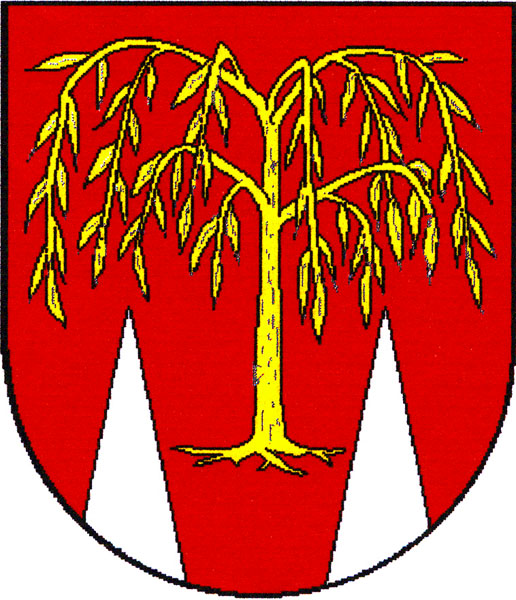
- Flag Coat of arms

- Location in the Czech Republic
- Coordinates: 49°14′0″N 16°55′6″E
- Country: Czech Republic
- Region: South Moravian
- District: Vyškov
- First mentioned: 1358

Area
  - Total: 5.29 km^{2} (2.04 sq mi)
- Elevation: 260 m (850 ft)

Population (2026-01-01)
  - Total: 662
  - Density: 125/km^{2} (324/sq mi)
- Time zone: UTC+1 (CET)
  - Summer (DST): UTC+2 (CEST)
- Postal code: 683 01
- Website: www.obectucapy.cz

Tučapy is a municipality and village in Vyškov District in the South Moravian Region of the Czech Republic. It has about 700 inhabitants.

Tučapy lies approximately 7 kilometres (4 mi) south-west of Vyškov, 23 km (14 mi) east of Brno, and 204 km (127 mi) south-east of Prague.

== Demographics ==
Historical population
Year	Pop.	±%
1869	655	—
1880	615	−6.1%
1890	648	+5.4%
1900	662	+2.2%
1910	661	−0.2%
1921	749	+13.3%
1930	789	+5.3%
1950	697	−11.7%
1961	700	+0.4%
1970	643	−8.1%
1980	618	−3.9%
1991	523	−15.4%
2001	484	−7.5%
2011	523	+8.1%
2021	573	+9.6%
Source: Censuses
