= Tučapy (Uherské Hradiště District) =

- Municipality
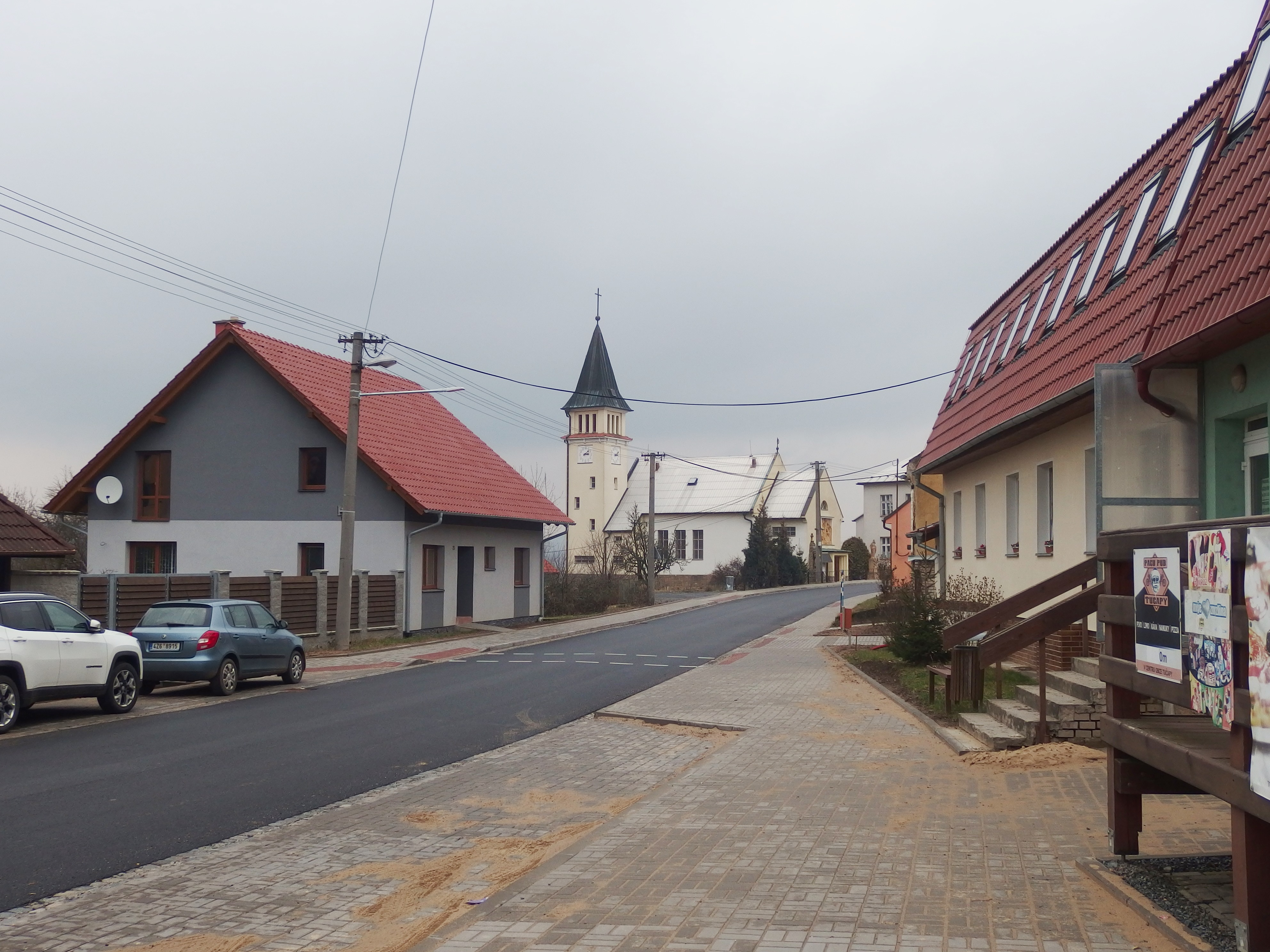
- Main street

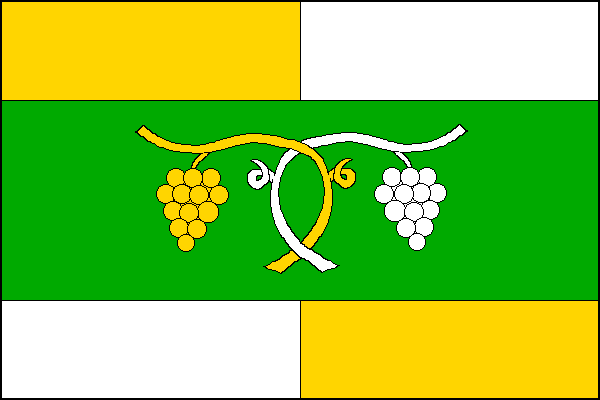
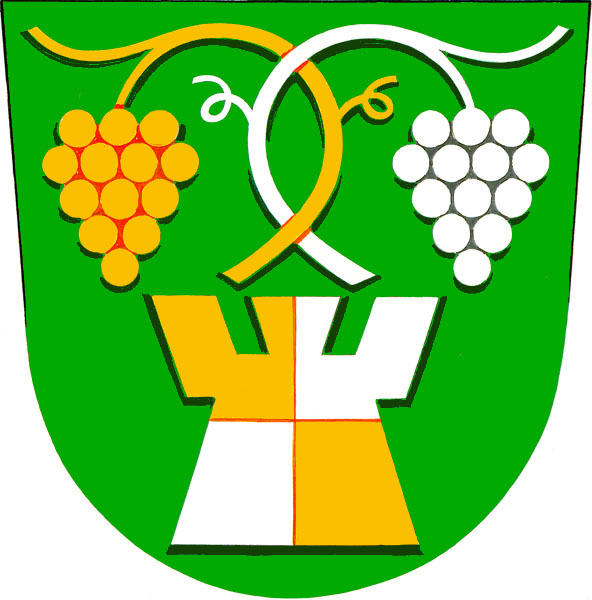
- Flag Coat of arms

- Location in the Czech Republic
- Coordinates: 49°2′53″N 17°19′53″E
- Country: Czech Republic
- Region: Zlín
- District: Uherské Hradiště
- First mentioned: 1141

Area
  - Total: 2.46 km^{2} (0.95 sq mi)
- Elevation: 320 m (1,050 ft)

Population (2026-01-01)
  - Total: 265
  - Density: 108/km^{2} (279/sq mi)
- Time zone: UTC+1 (CET)
  - Summer (DST): UTC+2 (CEST)
- Postal code: 687 09
- Website: www.tucapyuh.cz

Tučapy is a municipality and village in Uherské Hradiště District in the Zlín Region of the Czech Republic. It has about 300 inhabitants.

Tučapy lies approximately 10 kilometres (6 mi) west of Uherské Hradiště, 32 km (20 mi) south-west of Zlín, and 240 km (150 mi) south-east of Prague.

== Demographics ==
Historical population
Year	Pop.	±%
1869	348	—
1880	389	+11.8%
1890	443	+13.9%
1900	440	−0.7%
1910	457	+3.9%
1921	433	−5.3%
1930	444	+2.5%
1950	424	−4.5%
1961	472	+11.3%
1970	412	−12.7%
1980	315	−23.5%
1991	229	−27.3%
2001	210	−8.3%
2011	224	+6.7%
2021	232	+3.6%
Source: Censuses
