= Karel Ančerl =

Czech conductor and composer (1908–1973)

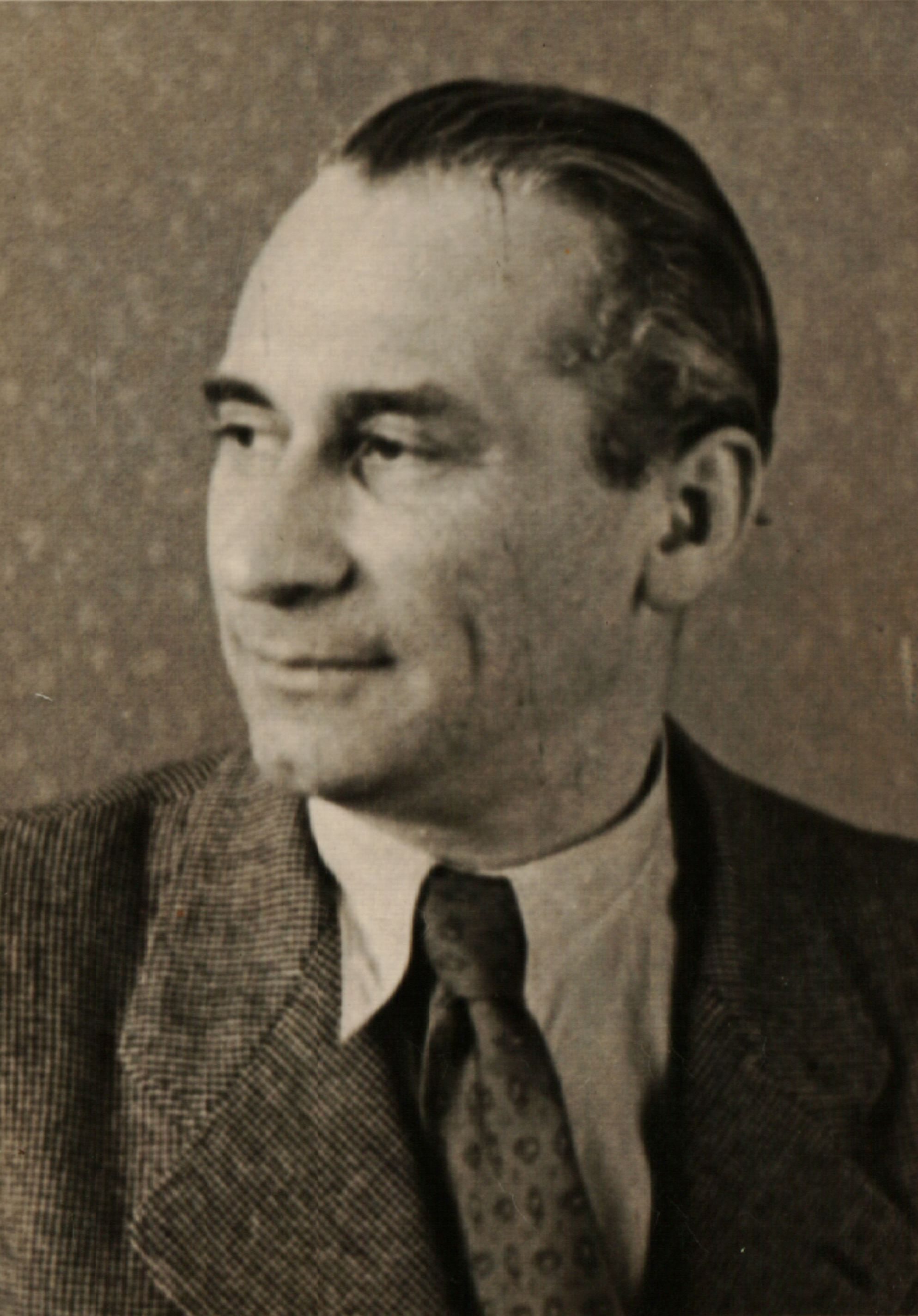
- Born: 11 April 1908; Tučapy, Bohemia, Austria-Hungary
- Died: 3 July 1973 (aged 65); Toronto, Ontario, Canada
- Occupations: Conductor; composer

Karel Ančerl (11 April 1908 – 3 July 1973) (Czech pronunciation: [karɛl ant͡ʃɛrl]) was a Czech conductor and composer, renowned especially for his performances of contemporary music and for his interpretations of music by Czech composers.

Ančerl was born into a prosperous Jewish family in the village of Tučapy in southern Bohemia. After graduating from the Prague Conservatory, he pursued his conducting studies under Hermann Scherchen and Václav Talich. He was the assistant conductor at the Munich premiere of Alois Hába's quarter-tone opera Mother (1931) and conducted the orchestra of the avant-garde theatre Osvobozené divadlo in Prague (1931–1933). Conducting work for Czechoslovak radio was interrupted by World War II which resulted in his being imprisoned with his family in the Theresienstadt concentration camp in 1942 and then sent to Auschwitz in 1944. Unlike his wife and young son, Ančerl survived Auschwitz.

After the war, Ančerl conducted for Radio Prague until 1950, when he became artistic director of the Czech Philharmonic, a post he held successfully for eighteen years. Following the 1968 invasion of Czechoslovakia, Ančerl emigrated to Toronto, Canada, where he worked as music director of the Toronto Symphony Orchestra until his death in 1973.

As a conductor, Ančerl helped foster a distinctly Czech orchestral sound, both within the Czech Philharmonic and elsewhere. Highly regarded also as a studio artist, Ančerl made a wide range of recordings on the Supraphon label, including repertoire by various Czech composers (remastered in the Karel Ančerl Gold Edition).

== Life ==
He was born into a prosperous Jewish family in the village of Tučapy in southern Bohemia, where his father Leopold was a large-scale producer of liquors and spirits. After graduating from the gymnasium in Prague (1918–24) he studied composition and conducting at the Prague Conservatory between 1925 and 1929, along with chamber music, violin and percussion. In 1931 he participated as assistant conductor at the Munich premiere of Alois Hába's quarter-tone opera Mother. Ančerl also studied conducting under Hermann Scherchen in Strasbourg and with Václav Talich in Prague. Between 1931 and 1933, he conducted the orchestra of the avant-garde theatre Osvobozené divadlo in Prague, where he brought about a marked improvement in playing standards. From 1933 to 1939, he conducted for the Czechoslovak Radio, but his career as a conductor was interrupted by World War II.

He was sent with his family to the Theresienstadt concentration camp (Terezín) on 12 November 1942. There, he became the leader of the large Terezín String Orchestra and started to organize cultural and music life in the ghetto. His final performance was for the propaganda film Theresienstadt, directed, under coercion of the camp commandant Karl Rahm, by Kurt Gerron to fool the Red Cross. The film showed Ančerl conducting a work by Pavel Haas on a wooden pavilion, with flowerpots hiding the fact that many of the orchestra were barefoot. The film also featured Martin Roman's big band, the Ghetto Swingers. As soon as the film was over, Gerron, Ančerl, Haas, Roman and all those who had participated in the film were herded into cattle trucks for the final transport to Auschwitz on 15 October 1944. Ančerl managed to survive Auschwitz, but his wife Valy and son Jan (born in Terezín) were murdered in the gas chambers.

From 1946 to 1947 he was a conductor for The State Opera. Later he conducted for Prague Radio Symphony Orchestra until he was appointed artistic director of the Czech Philharmonic on the recommendation of David Oistrakh in 1950. His eighteen-year tenure with this orchestra is often regarded as its greatest period, which brought it much international recognition. In 1950 he joined masonic lodge Dílna lidskosti in Prague, which was part of the National Grand Lodge of Czechoslovakia. In August 1968, after the Warsaw Pact invasion of Czechoslovakia, he decided to emigrate to Toronto, Ontario, Canada. He conducted his last two concerts with the Czech Philharmonic Orchestra at the Prague Spring Festival in 1969. He conducted the Toronto Symphony Orchestra from 1968 until his death in Toronto in 1973. His tomb is located in Vyšehrad Cemetery in Prague.

Some of his notable pupils include Brian Jackson, Štěpán Koníček, Libor Pešek, Jan Tausinger, and Martin Turnovský.

== Style ==
As a conductor, Ančerl followed a recognizably Czech tradition. Along with Václav Talich, Karel Šejna, Václav Neumann and others, he helped foster a distinctly Czech orchestral sound. Rhythmic sharpness, vibrant dynamics, and a keenly etched sound were hallmarks of his conducting style. While these characteristics were especially evident when he conducted his home orchestra, the Czech Philharmonic, he also persuaded orchestras such as the Toronto Symphony, the Vienna Symphony and the Royal Concertgebouw Orchestra to play with a distinctive Czech sound. Ančerl's work on the podium brought out the indigenous characteristics of repertoire to which that would apply. There also was an innate classical sense to his work in Mozart, Beethoven, Brahms. He employed spiritually-infused lyricism absorbed by life and of nature – sample his discs of Martinu's Fifth and Sixth Symphonies, or Mahler's Ninth on Supraphon. He himself may have attributed some of this to the horrors he witnessed or experienced during the war – certainly a few others have.

Ančerl remains highly regarded as a recording artist. His broad range of recordings for the Czech Supraphon label have been carefully remastered for the Karel Ančerl Gold Edition, which was awarded the Grand Prix du Disque by l'Académie Charles Cros. In addition to performances of Czech composers, including Antonín Dvořák, Bedřich Smetana, Leoš Janáček, Bohuslav Martinů and Miloslav Kabeláč, Ančerl is also admired for his interpretations of 20th-century composers such as Gustav Mahler, Igor Stravinsky, Béla Bartók, Sergei Prokofiev and Dmitri Shostakovich, as well as the Toronto-based organist/composer Healey Willan. He also championed less widely known Czech composers, such as Jan Hanuš, Iša Krejčí, Otmar Mácha and Ladislav Vycpálek. Performances with several orchestras have appeared on labels such as Tahra, CBC Records and EMI. Line Classics has issued some radio recordings made during the late 1940s, when Ančerl returned to Prague.

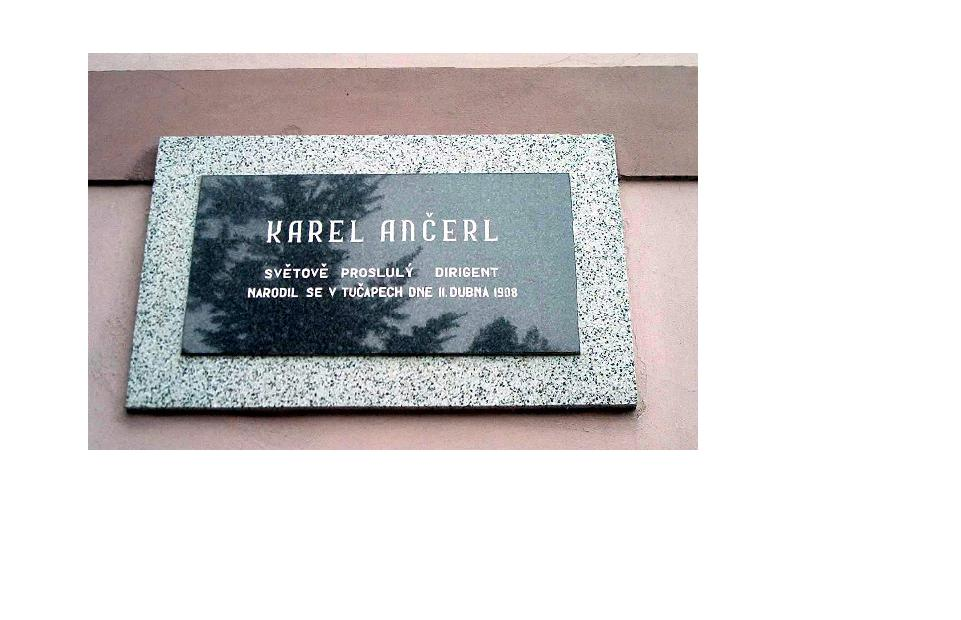
Memorial plaque to Ančerl unveiled on 6 September 1998 on the building of the municipal office in his native Tučapy
