= Martinů Quartet =

Czech string quartet ensemble founded in 1976

The Martinů Quartet (Czech: Kvarteto Martinů) is a Czech string quartet ensemble founded in 1976, originally under the name Havlák Quartet by students of Professor Viktor Moučka at the Prague Conservatory. In 1985, with the approval of the Bohuslav Martinů Foundation, the quartet assumed its present name Martinů Quartet, pledging to promote the chamber music of Czech composer Bohuslav Martinů. The quartet specialises in the works of Czech composers such as Smetana, Dvořák and Janáček, and especially the works of Bohuslav Martinů. They perform regularly at the Prague Spring Festival as well as concerts in many European Countries, the United States, Canada and Japan. The quartet also teaches chamber music performance at two annual chamber music workshops in the Czech Republic, which are open to both amateur and professional musicians.

== Members ==
- Lubomír Havlák, first violin
- Adéla Štajnochrová, second violin
- Zbyněk Paďourek, viola
- Jitka Vlašánková, violoncello

== Awards ==
The Martinů Quartet took part in eight international chamber music competitions and won awards at each event, most notably at the Prague Spring Festival and the competitions held in Evian, Florence, Munich (ARD) and Portsmouth. In 2001, the quartet was awarded the Bohuslav Martinů Prize by the Bohuslav Martinů Foundation in recognition of the quartet's achievement promoting the chamber music of Bohuslav Martinů. In 2003, the quartet's recording of Sylvie Bodorová's Terezín Ghetto Requiem received the Music Web UK's Recording of the month award. In 2004, the quartet received the celebrated MIDEM award in Cannes for the best CD of the year in the category solo and ensemble repertoire of the 20th century.

== Recordings ==
The Martinů Quartet has released more than 20 CDs on major classical music labels, most notably on Naxos, but also Arcos Diva, Harmonia Mundi and others. In addition to recordings for release on CD, they have also recorded for radio broadcasts by Czech Radio, Radio France, BBC, ARD and ORF.

The quartet's most positively reviewed CD releases include

- The complete string quartets by Bohuslav Martinů, released in 3 volumes on Naxos
  - Vol.1, string quartets Tri jezdci, #1 and #2 in 1995, #8.553782, Review on Classics Today
  - Vol.2, string quartets #3 and #6 in 1996, #8.553783, Review on Classics Today
  - Vol.3, string quartets #4, #5 and #7 in 1997, #8.553784, Review on Classics Today
- Terezín Ghetto Requiem by Sylvie Bodorová and string quartet by Ronald Stevenson, released on Arco Diva in 2003, #UP 0052-2 131
- Piano quintets and violin sonatas by Bohuslav Martinů, released on Naxos in 2007, #8.557861, Review on Classics Today

== Publications ==
The Martinů Quartet has been featured in multiple non-trivial published works in reliable and reputable media such as the Czech online musical encyclopedia published by the music faculty of Masaryk University of Brno, the Grove musical encyclopedia published by Oxford University, The New York Times, Classic Today magazine, Music Web UK and others.

== Sources ==
- Kvarteto Martinů entry in the musical encyclopedia published by the Music Faculty of Masaryk University in Brno
- Grove musical encyclopedia published by Oxford University (access to online version restricted to paying subscribers)
- Classics Today, MIDEM 2004 Award winners
- Music Web UK, Recording of the month, November 2003
- Article in The New Yorker, February 24, 2003
- Article by Michael Beckerman in The New York Times, June 15, 2003
- Article by Tim Ashley in The Guardian, May 11, 2007
- Article by Carl Bauman, American Record Guide, September/October 2000
- Articles by Jan Smaczny, BBC Music Magazine, October 2000 and February 2003
- Article by Bob McQuiston, Classical Lost and Found, April 2007
- Archives of the Academy of Performing Arts in Prague (AMU)
- Archives of the Bohuslav Martinů Foundation in Prague and Basel
- Archives of the Prague Spring International Music Festival
- Archives of the ARD broadcasting corporation
- Kvarteto Martinů entry at Žižkov's music festival website
- Under the Linden Festival website
- Martinů Quartet profile
- Naxos artists profile
