= Tučapy (Tábor District) =

- Municipality
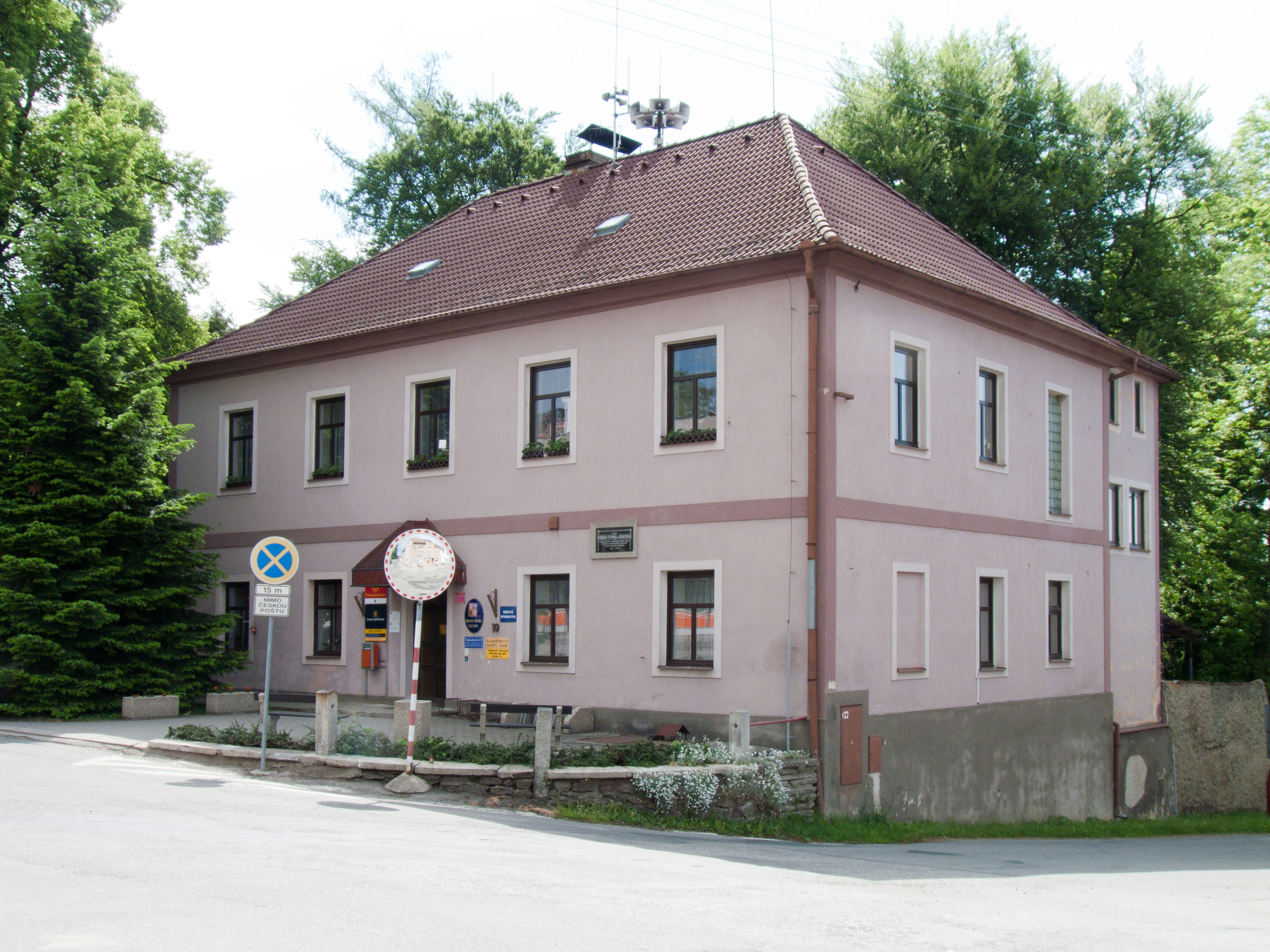
- Municipal office

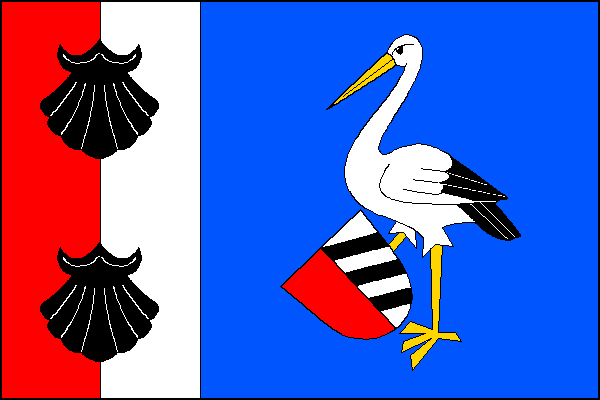
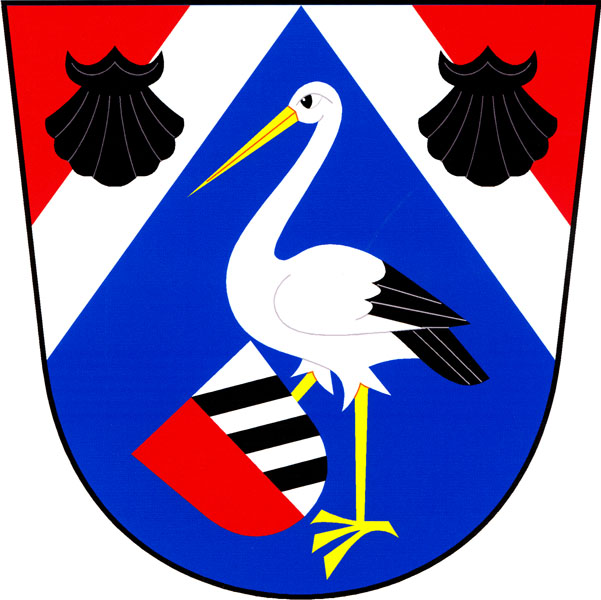
- Flag Coat of arms

- Location in the Czech Republic
- Coordinates: 49°17′29″N 14°48′12″E
- Country: Czech Republic
- Region: South Bohemian
- District: Tábor
- First mentioned: 1350

Area
  - Total: 18.59 km^{2} (7.18 sq mi)
- Elevation: 455 m (1,493 ft)

Population (2026-01-01)
  - Total: 818
  - Density: 44.0/km^{2} (114/sq mi)
- Time zone: UTC+1 (CET)
  - Summer (DST): UTC+2 (CEST)
- Postal codes: 391 26, 392 01
- Website: www.tucapy.cz

Tučapy is a municipality and village in Tábor District in the South Bohemian Region of the Czech Republic. It has about 800 inhabitants.

== Administrative division ==
Tučapy consists of three municipal parts (in brackets population according to the 2021 census):

- Tučapy (570)
- Brandlín (66)
- Dvorce (146)

== Etymology ==
The name is derived from the Czech words tu ('here') and čapat ('to catch'). The name referred to a village of people who caught something here.

== Geography ==
Tučapy is located about 16 kilometres (10 mi) southeast of Tábor and 41 km (25 mi) northeast of České Budějovice. It lies in the Křemešník Highlands. The highest point is at 524 m (1,719 ft) above sea level. The stream Černovický potok flows through the municipality. The municipal territory is very rich in fishponds.

== History ==
The first written mention of Tučapy is in a document created between 1344 and 1350.

Tučapy had a significant Jewish community. In the 19th century, it was one of the largest Jewish communities in the region. Jews made up a third of the population.

== Demographics ==
Historical population

Year	Pop.	±%
1869	1,600	—
1880	1,676	+4.8%
1890	1,485	−11.4%
1900	1,319	−11.2%
1910	1,296	−1.7%

Year	Pop.	±%
1921	1,324	+2.2%
1930	1,192	−10.0%
1950	944	−20.8%
1961	1,025	+8.6%
1970	888	−13.4%

Year	Pop.	±%
1980	863	−2.8%
1991	831	−3.7%
2001	834	+0.4%
2011	780	−6.5%
2021	782	+0.3%

Source: Censuses

== Transport ==
There are no railways or major roads passing through the municipality.

== Sights ==
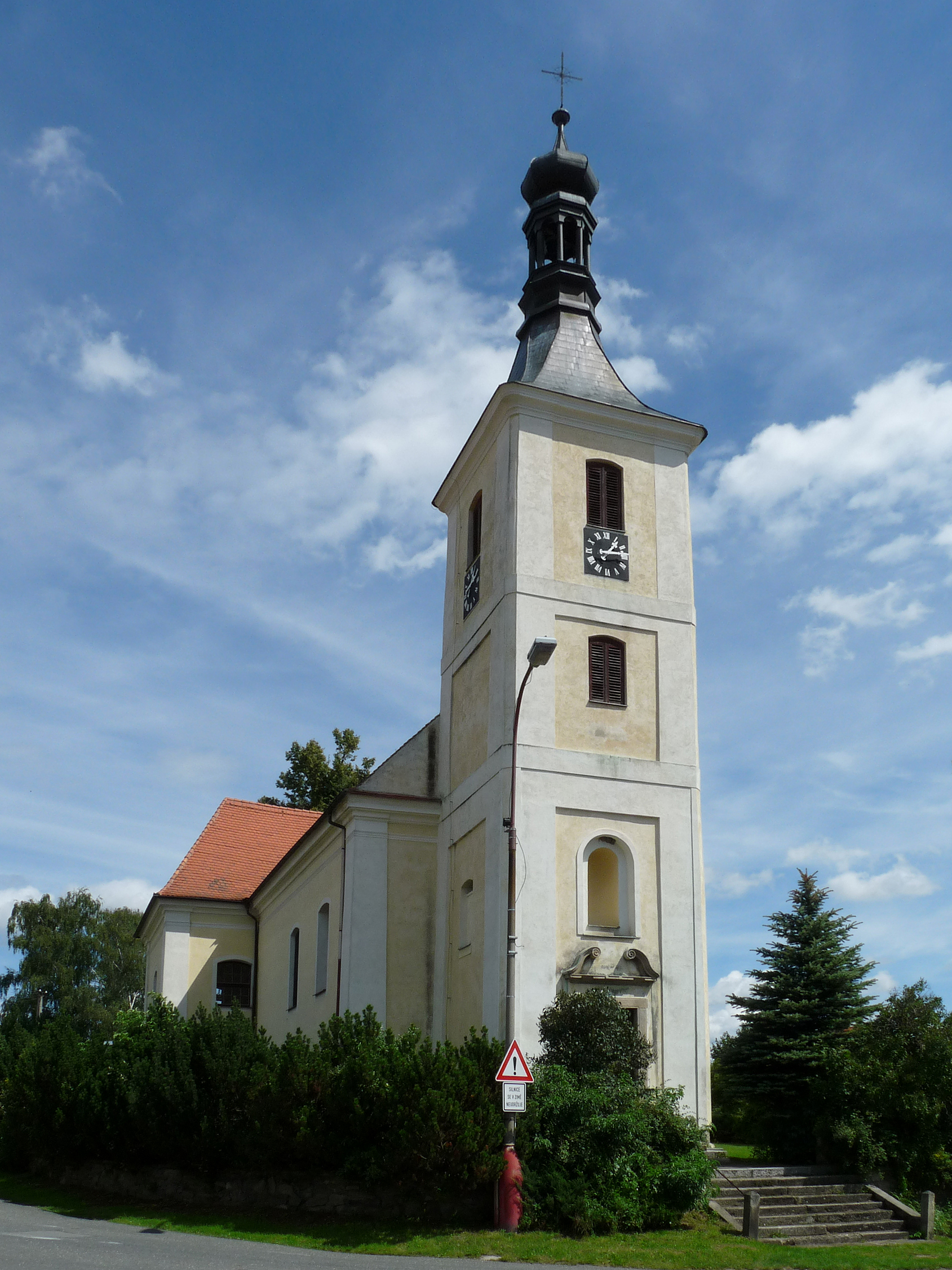
Church of Saint James the Great

The main landmark of Tučapy is the Church of Saint James the Great. A parish church in Tučapy was first mentioned in the 14th century. The current building dates from 1724.

There are several monuments connected with the Jewish community. These monuments include former Jewish school, synagogue and cemetery. The cemetery has an area of 2,356 m^{2} (25,360 sq ft) and the oldest preserved tombs date from 1737.

== Notable people ==
- Karel Ančerl (1908–1973), conductor
