= Music of the Czech Republic =

Music of the Czech Republic comprises the musical traditions of that state or the historical entities of which it is compound, i.e. the Czech lands (Bohemia, Moravia, Czech Silesia). Czech music also constitutes a substantial part of the music culture of its direct predecessor, Czechoslovakia.

Music in this area has its roots in sacred music from more than a thousand years ago. The oldest recorded song from this territory is the hymn "Hospodine, pomiluj ny" ("Lord, Have Mercy on Us"), dating from the turn of the 11th century.

== Traditional music ==
Bohemian traditional music includes that of Chodsko, where bagpipes are common. Moravian traditional music is known for the cimbalom, which is played in ensembles that also include double bass, clarinet and violins. The traditional music of Moravia displays regional influences, especially in Valachia with a Romanian and Ukrainian legacy, and has close cultural relations with Slovakia and Lachia (the borderland of northern Moravia and Czech Silesia) with its Polish aspects.

A famous dance from the region is the Bohemian polka.

Ukázka z řemeslnického tance Břitva
Traditional Czech folk song

== Bohemian music ==
Early evidence of music from this region is documented in manuscripts from the library of the Cistercian monastery in Vyšší Brod (founded in 1259). One of the most important is manuscript No. 42, from 1410. It contains a hymn called Jezu Kriste, ščedrý kněže ("Jesus Christ Bountiful Prince"), that people would sing during the preaching of Jan Hus.

With the development of towns in the 15th century, music started to play an important role in two Bohemian centers: Prachatice and Sušice. Václav z Prachatic (Václav of Prachatice) dealt with the theory of music at the Charles University in Prague. His manuscript Musica magistrii Johannis de Muris accurtata de musica Boethii is a collective work on the theory of music inspired by the thoughts of Johan de Muris, who worked in Paris, and is in the university library.

Extensive musical activities in Prachatice took place in the second half of the 16th century during the Renaissance, a notable period of literátská bratrstva ("men of letters brotherhoods"). Their main focus was community singing performed during ceremonial services. The brotherhood established its memorial book in 1575, which described its activities until 1949, when the brotherhood perished. The Habsburg Counter-Reformation in Bohemia after 1620 also affected music in the region. Catholic priests performed Gregorian chorals, while the people sang spiritual songs often based on the Protestant tradition. This ended in a new Catholic edition of hymn books such as Capella regia musicalis.

The Czech classicism period is exemplified by František Xaver Brixi, Johann Baptist Wanhal, and Augustin Šenkýř. Among the 18th and 19th century composers are Vincenc Mašek, Jakub Jan Ryba, Jan August Vitásek. In the 19th century, German and Austrian productions also had their place here. The founder of Czech national music Bedřich Smetana was inspired by the Bohemian Forest while creating his symphonic poem Vltava. Antonín Dvořák was also inspired by the Bohemian Forest in his piece Silent Woods.

The traditional music of Bohemia and Moravia influenced the work of composers like Leoš Janáček, Antonín Dvořák, Bedřich Smetana, and Bohuslav Martinů. Earlier composers from the region include Adam Michna, Heinrich Biber, Mathilde Ringelsberg, Jan Dismas Zelenka, Johann Wenzel Stamitz and Johann Ladislaus Dussek.

== See also ==
- List of Czech laureates of international music awards
