= Karel Toman =

Czech poet (1877–1946)

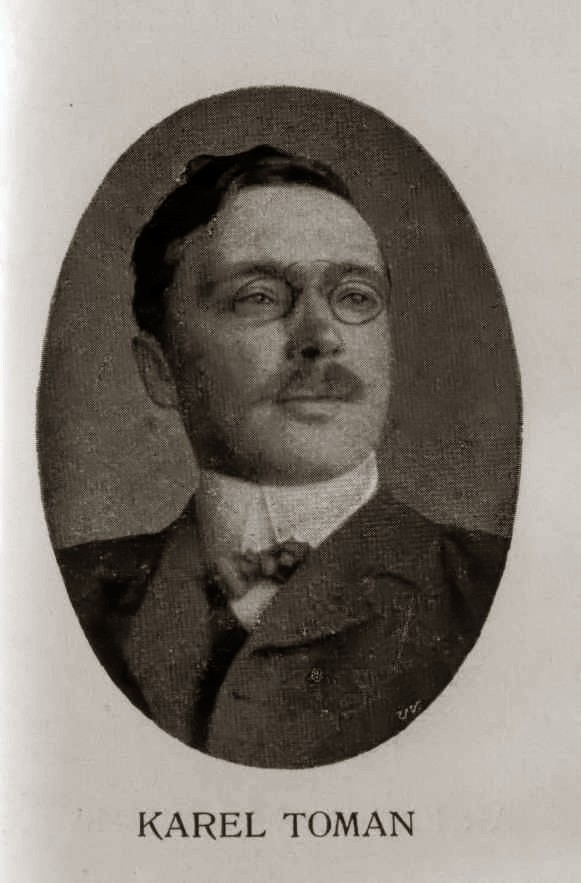
- Born: Antonín Bernášek; February 25, 1877; Kokovice, Kingdom of Bohemia, Austria-Hungary
- Died: June 12, 1946 (aged 69); Prague, Third Czechoslovak Republic
- Resting place: Vyšehrad Cemetery
- Education: Faculty of Law, Charles University
- Spouse: Anna Wagenknecht
- Children: 2
- Writing career
- Language: Czech
- Years active: 1898-1925

Signature
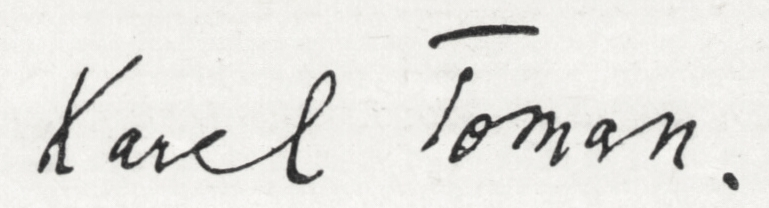

Karel Toman (born as Antonín Bernášek) (1877–1946) was a Czech lyric poet.
