= Otmar Mácha =

Czech composer

Otmar Mácha (2 October 1922 in Mariánské Hory, Ostrava – 14 December 2006 in Pardubice) was a Czech composer. He was member of the Quattro group of Czech composers with Sylvie Bodorová, Luboš Fišer and Zdeněk Lukáš.

== Works ==
Operas:

- Polapená nevěra (Infidelity Unmasked 1958)
- Jezero Ukereve (Lake Ukereve 1963)
- Svatba na oko (Feigned Wedding)
- Tarzanova smrt (1963)
- Nenávistná láska (2002)
- Metamorphoses
