= Zdeněk Lukáš =

Czech composer (1928–2007)

Zdeněk Lukáš (21 August 1928 – 13 July 2007) was a Czech composer. He authored over 330 works.

== Biography ==
Lukáš was born on 21 August 1928 in Prague. He graduated from a teachers' college and worked as a teacher from 1953 to 1963. He was a musical editor and program director at the national broadcasting company in Plzeň and conducted the Česká píseň (Czech Song), a choir in Plzeň. He died on 13 July 2007 in Prague, at the age of 78.

== Selected works ==
=== Opera ===
- Ať žije mrtvý (Let the Dead Live), Op.52 (1967); 3 scenes; libretto by Jiří Hurt
- O smutné princezně Upolíně (Upolína, the Sad Princess), Op.57 (1968); little children's opera for radio; libretto by Kamil Bednář
- Domácí karneval (The Local Carnival), Op.60 (1968); Chamber opera for radio (or television); libretto by Zdeněk Barborka
- Planeta s tiše fialovou září (The Planet with the Light Purple Glow), Astronomical Opera, Op.141 (1979); libretto by Jiří Suchý
- Falkenštejn, Op.197 (1984–1985); libretto by Dagmar Ledečová
- Veta za vetu (Measure for Measure), Op.206 (1986); 2 acts (6 scenes); libretto by Dagmar Ledečová after William Shakespeare

=== Orchestra ===
- Pathetická předehra (Pathétique Overture), Op. 2
- Rej (Rondo), Op.3
- Matce (To Mother), Symphonic Poem, Op. 5
- Symfonická svita (Symphonic Suite), Op. 6
- Symfonietta No.1, Op.8
- Divertimento for Chamber Orchestra, Op. 16
- Symfonietta No. 2, Op. 18
- Symphony No. 1, Op. 22 (1960)
- Symphony No. 2, Op. 26 (1961)
- Partita for Chamber Orchestra, Op. 30
- Allegro for Chamber Orchestra, Op. 30a
- Symphony No.3 "Dove sta amore" for Mixed Chorus and Orchestra, Op. 40 (1965)
- Symfonietta solemnis, Op. 43 (1965)
- Andante for Large String Orchestra with Flute and Harp, Op. 46a (1965)
- Scherzoso for String Orchestra, Harp, Celesta and Piccolo, Op. 46b (1965)
- Symphony No.4, Op. 47 (1965)
- Partita in C for Chamber Orchestra, Op. 62 (1969)
- Postludium, Op.7 7 (1971)
- SAAB 96, Op. 79 (1971)
- Symphony No.5 for Lyric Soprano Solo and Large Orchestra, Op. 82 (1972)
- Malá svita (Little Suite) for Chamber Orchestra, Op. 92 (1972)
- A Tribute to Youth, Op. 97 (1973)
- Musica da Concerto for 12 Strings and Harpsichord, Op. 102 (1974)
- Princezna Pinkpink a šašek Cupkyhup, Suite for Chamber Orchestra, Op. 115 (1975)
- Bagately (Bagatelles), Op. 150 (1980)
- Finale Festoso, Festival Music in One Movement, Op. 172 (1982)
- Canti for String Orchestra, Op. 175 (1982)
- Ouvertura Boema, Festive Overture, Op. 187 (1984)
- Symphony No.6, Op. 232 (1991)
- Znělka, Op. 281 (1996)
- Symphony No.7 "Trionfo del tempo" for Soprano Solo and Orchestra, Op. 312 (2000)

=== Concert band ===
- Finale, Op.83 (1972)
- Musica Boema, 2 Movements for Winds, Brass, Harp, Xylophone and Glockenspiel, Op.137 (1978)
- Finale, Op.190 (1984)
- Sinfonia Brevis, Op.265 (1995)
- Pražská slavnostní hudba (Prague Festive Music), Op.267 (1995)
- Ave Maria, Aria for Winds, Op.325 (2002)
- Slavia – Galopp, Op.273 (1995)
- Choral – Präludium, Op.282 (1996)
- Musica Bohemica, Overture for Large Wind Orchestra, Op.285 (1997)
- Messaggio, Symphonic Poem for Large Wind Orchestra, Op.295 (1998)
- Metamorfosy, Op.299 (1998)
- Kyrie Eleison to the Memory of Saint Wenceslas, King of Bohemia, Op.331 (2003)
- Fanfára pro Hudbu hradní stráže (Fanfare for the Music of the Castle Guard), Op.337

=== Concertante ===
- Concerto [No.1] in G Minor for Piano and Orchestra, Op.4
- Fantazie for Piano and Orchestra, Op.9a
- Rondo for Piano and Orchestra, Op.9b
- Concerto [No.1] for Violin and Orchestra, Op.11 (1956)
- Concerto [No.1] for Cello and Orchestra, Op.13 (1957)
- Komorní svita (Chamber Suite) for Piano and String Orchestra, Op.15 (1958)
- Concertino for Violin, Piano and String Orchestra, Op.24
- Concerto for Soprano Saxophone and Orchestra, Op.34 (1963)
- Concerto Grosso No.1 for Solo String Quartet and String Orchestra, Op.36 (1964)
- Sonata Concertata for Piano and Orchestra, Op.49 (1966)
- Concerto for Violin, Viola and Orchestra, Op.58 (1968)
- Variations for Piano and Orchestra, Op.69 (1970)
- Svita (Suite) for Solo Clarinet, Flute (Piccolo), Cimbalom and Orchestra, Op.80 (1971)
- Concerto Grosso No.2 for Solo Flute, Solo Violin, Orchestra and Magnetic Tape, Op.87 (1972)
- Serenade for Flute, Oboe, Viola, Bassoon, String Orchestra and Percussion, Op.103 (1974)
- Preludium, Fuga and Postludium for Tenor-Saxophone and Chamber Orchestra, Op.107 (1974)
- Concerto for Bassoon and Orchestra, Op.113 (1976)
- Concerto for Clarinet and Orchestra, Op.119 (1976)
- Concerto Grosso No.3 for 6 Solo Violins and Chamber Orchestra, Op.129 (1977)
- Proměny (Transformations), Concert Piece for Piano and Orchestra, Op.140 (1978)
- Concerto for Harpsichord and String Orchestra, Op.152 (1980)
- Concerto [No.2] for Violin and Orchestra, Op.163 (1981)
- Concerto for Flute and Orchestra, Op.164 (1981)
- Koncertní hudba (Concert Music) for Solo Harp and String Orchestra, Op.177 (1982)
- Koncertantní svita (Suite Concertante) for Brass Quintet (2 Trumpets, Horn, 2 Trombones) and String Ensemble, Op.184 (1983)
- Concerto for Viola and Orchestra, Op.185 (1983)
- Concerto [No.2] for Piano and Orchestra, Op.192 (1984)
- Preludio e Rondo for Solo Violin and String Orchestra, Op.201 (1985)
- Concerto [No.2] for Cello and Orchestra, Op.204 (1986)
- Concerto for Horn and Orchestra, Op.223 (1989)
- Double Concerto for Violin, Cello and Orchestra, Op.224 (1989)
- Duo di basso, Double Concerto for Cello, Double Bass and String Chamber Orchestra, Op.227 (1989); revision of Op.210
- Concertino for Violin, Marimba and String Orchestra, Op.233 (1988)
- Za Dunaj, Piece for Harpsichord and Chamber Orchestra, Op.240
- Concerto for Cimbalom and String Orchestra, Op.244 (1991)
- Concertino Dedicato for Solo Violin and String Chamber Orchestra, Op.248 (1992)
- Concerto No.3 for Piano and Orchestra, Op.258 (1993)
- Concerto Grosso No.4 for 4 Saxophones and String Orchestra, Op.262 (1994)
- Vox cordis mei, Concerto for Organ, 2 Trumpets and String Orchestra, Op.293 (1997)
- Double Concerto for Oboe, Bassoon and Orchestra, Op.302 (1999)
- Double Concerto for Oboe, Bassoon and Orchestra, Op.304 (1999)
- Concerto for Trumpet and Orchestra, Op.323
- Symfonický koncert (Symphonic Concerto) for String Quartet and String Orchestra, Op.324
- Concerto for Violin, Piano and String Orchestra, Op.335
- Ricordi, Concerto for Cello and String Orchestra, Op.344 (2005)
- Dies Natalis for Solo Violin and String Orchestra, Op.348
- Sinfonia Concertante for Trumpet, Horn, Trombone and Orchestra, Op.349

=== Chamber music ===
- Čtyři fragmenty (4 Fragments) for Violin, Clarinet and Piano Left Hand, Op.10
- Kvartetino, String Quartet [No.1], Op.12
- Trio Violin, Piano and Small Drum, Op.32 (1962)
- String Quartet No.2, Op.42 (1965)
- Musica Rytmica, Concerto for Percussion (1 Player) and 8 Wind Instruments, Op. 51 (1966)
- Woodwind Quintet with Triangle, Op.61 (1968)
- Duetti for Violin, Bassoon, Viola, Clarinet, Cello, Oboe, Double Bass, Flute and Percussion, Op.66 (1969)
- Rondo for 4 Saxophones, Op.70 (1970)
- Amoroso, Miniature Incidental Piece for E♭ Clarinet, Bagpipes and Double Bass, Op.75 (1971)
- String Quartet No.3, Op.93 (1973)
- Divertimento for Violin and Viola, Op.96 (1973)
- Tři ronda (3 Rondos) for Flute, Cello and Piano, Op.104 (1974)
- Piano Trio, Op.106 (1974)
- Kratochvíle pro pět (Pastime for Five), Piece for Woodwind Quintet, Op.121 (1976)
- Katedrály (Cathedrals), 5 Movements for Brass Quintet and Organ, Op.124 (1976)
- Co umím nakreslit, Suite for Chamber Ensemble of Instrumental Soloists, Op.127 (1977)
- Intarzie, 3 Movements for Violin, Viola and Cello, Op.132 (1977)
- Sonata di Danza [Piano Quartet No.1] for Violin, Viola, Cello and Piano, Op.151 (1980)
- Raccontino for E♭ Baritone Saxophone and Percussion (2 Players), Op.153 (1980)
- Rozhovor s panem Myslivečkem v roce 1981 (Conversations with Mysliveček in the Year 1981), Rondo for Flute, Violin, Viola and Cello, Op.155 (1980)
- Serenade for Brass Quintet, Op.161 (1981)
- 2 + 2 for E♭ Alto Saxophone, Bass Clarinet, Marimba and Vibraphone, Op.179 (1982)
- Canzoni da Sonar for Flute, Oboe, Violin, Viola and Cello, Op.181 (1983)
- Dvojlístek, Little Serenade for Violin and Viola, Op.205a (1986)
- Dvojhry (Duo) for Violin and Cello, Op.207 (1987)
- Duo di Basso for Cello and Double Bass, Op.210 (1987); revised as Op.227
- Letní hudba (Summer Music) for 3 Trumpets, B♭ Bass Trumpet, 2 Horns, 2 Trombones, Euphonium, Tuba and Percussion, Op.212 (1987)
- String Quartet No.4, Op.213 (1987)
- Intarzie II for Violin, Horn and Piano, Op.226 (1989)
- Piano Quartet No.2, Op.241 (1991)
- Malé finale (Little Finale) for String Quartet, Op.242 (1991)
- Trio for Violin, Viola and Cello, Op.246 (1991)
- Nonetto for Flute, Oboe, Clarinet, Bassoon, Horn, Violin, Viola, Cello and Double Bass, Op.250 (1992)
- Duetti II, Op.251 (1992)
- Quartetto con Flauto for Flute, Violin, Cello and Piano, Op.253 (1992)
- Kasace for Flute, Oboe and Viola, Op.270 (1995)
- Partita alla Fanfare for Brass Quintet, Op.271 (1995)
- Nonet for 3 Trumpets, 2 Horns, 3 Trombones and Tuba, Op.278
- Ricordo, Quintet for 2 Oboes, Bassoon, Harpsichord and Double Bass, Op.296 (1998)
- Serenata for Cello and Double Bass, Op.300 (1998)
- Pastorely (Pastorales), Easy Pieces for Violin, Cello and Piano, Op.303 (1999)
- Contrasti per quattro, String Quartet No.5, Op.305 (1999)
- Trio in D for Oboe, Clarinet and Bassoon, Op.310 (2000)
- Serenata Piccola for Flute, Oboe, Clarinet and Horn, Op.318
- Per Tutte le Corde, Quintet for Harp and String Quartet, Op.320 (2001)
- Cantico for 12 Cellos and 2 Double Basses, Op.333
- Sextet for 2 Violins, Viola, Cello, Double Bass and Piano, Op.339
- Trio Boemo for Violin, Cello and Piano, Op.343 (2004)
- Rita mattinata for String Quartet, Op.345
- Proměny lásky (Transformations of Love), Trio for Flute, Viola and Cello, Op.351
- Rotlevův šlojíř, Trio for Violin, Viola and Piano, Op.354 (2007)

Flute

- Sonatina for Flute and Piano, Op.19
- Canto for 4 Flutes and Harpsichord, Op.275 (1996)
- Cantabile e Fugato for Flute and Piano, Op.292 (1997)

Oboe

- Pět listů (5 Leaves) for Oboe and Harp, Op.249 (1992)
- Impulsioni for Oboe and Piano, Op.313 (2000)

Clarinet

- Sonata for Clarinet and Piano, Op.23
- Legenda for Bass Clarinet (or Tenor Saxophone) and Piano, Op.85 (1972)
- Koncertantní etuda (Concertante Etude) for Clarinet and Piano, Op.203 (1986)

Bassoon

- Rondo for Bassoon and Piano, Op.168 (1981)

Trumpet

- Dvojzpěvy (Duets) in 3 Parts for Trumpet in D and Organ, Op.125 (1976)
- Liturgical Songs for Solo Trumpet and Organ, Op.315 (2000)

Horn

- Corni di Praga, Partita for 4 Horns, Op.130 (1977)

Saxophone

- Lento Dramatico for Alto Saxophone and Piano, Op.264 (1994)

Violin

- Šťáhlavská Sonatina for Violin and Piano, Op.7
- Dvě bagately (2 Bagatelles) for Violin and Piano, Op.14
- Partita Semplice for 4 Violins and Piano, Op.37
- Tři dua (3 Duos) for 2 Violins, Op.188 (1984)
- Suite in 3 Parts for Solo Violin, Op.218 (1988)
- Dubnová improvizace (Capricious Improvization) for Violin and Piano, Op.234 (1991)
- Ricordo sul G, Piece for Violin and Piano, Op.340
- Far Musica for 3 Solo Violins, Op.341 (2004)

Viola

- Hudba k vernisáži for Viola and Piano, Op.68 (1970)
- Meditace (Meditation) for Viola and Harpsichord, Op.116 (1975)
- Meditace – Rondo (Meditation – Rondo) for Viola and Harpsichord, Op.128 (1977)
- Cantabile for Viola and Harpsichord, Op.216 (1988)
- Sonata for Viola Solo, Op.243 (1991)
- Canto Appassionato for Viola and Piano, Op.308 (1999)
- Hosprenglic, Duo for Viola and Harp, Op.328 (2002)
- Supplemento for Viola and Harpsichord, Op.334
- Dolore ed Amore for 4 Violas, Op.347

Cello

- Rondo for Cello and Harpsichord, Op.257
- Musica per Ogni Tempo for 2 Cellos and Piano, Op.317 (2000)
- Preludium per Due Sonatori for Solo Cello and Percussion, Op.352 (2006)

Guitar

- Preludio Brevis for 4 Guitars, Op.342 (2004)

Harp

- Canzonette for Harp, Op.98 (1973)

Organ

- Ex regione Prachaticensi, Piece for Solo Organ, Op.123 (1976)
- Pražské pastorale (Prague Pastorale), Piece for Solo Organ, Op.158 (1981)
- Tusta, Rhapsody for Organ, Op.290 (1997)

Harpsichord

- Partita for Harpsichord, Op.154 (1980)
- V podzámčí, 4 Czech Dances for Solo Harpsichord with Mixed Chorus, Op.170 (1981)

Piano

- Dva klavírní kusy (2 Piano Pieces), Op.21
- Musica per Piano, 3 Pieces, Op.45 (1965)
- Balada (Ballade), Op.78 (1972)
- Píseň (Song), Op.88 (1972)
- Tři písně pro klavír (3 Songs for Piano), Op.91a (1972)
- Míša, Ríša, Mikinka, Op.91b (1972)
- Čtyři studie pro klavír (4 Etudes for Piano), Op.139 (1978)
- Canzone, Op.173 (1982)
- Koncertantní sonatina (Concertante Sonatina), Op.208 (1987)
- Corali for 2 Pianos, Op.247 (1992)
- Andante and Allegro, Op.269 (1995)

Other works

- Quot sunt apes, Rondo for female choir to Latin medieval student's poetry, Op.166 (1981)
- Dies Irae, from Requiem for Mixed Voices, Op.252 (1998)
