= The Art of Fugue discography =

This is a list of commercial recordings of Johann Sebastian Bach's The Art of Fugue. At present this list is not comprehensive; over 450 complete or partial recordings are commercially available

Artist	Date	Recording	Instrument and remarks
Roth Quartet	1934–1935	Divine Art 136/45	string quartet (includes conjectural end played by Donald Tovey on keyboard)
Richard Buhlig and Wesley Kuhnle	1934-1938	Pearl 0150	piano
Collegium Musicum conducted by Hermann Diener	1935	Electrola EH 1007-16	orchestra
Edward Power Biggs	1940	RCA Victor Red Seal DM 833	organ
Reichs-Bruckner-Orchester (Linz) conducted by Herbert von Karajan	1944	MeloClassic MC-5005	orchestra, abridged version
Radio-Orchester Beromünster	1949	History 204583-308	orchestra
Fritz Heitmann	1950	Telefunken AJ6.41905	organ
Gustav Leonhardt	1953	Vanguard Classics OVC 2011/12	harpsichord
Isolde Ahlgrimm	1953	Philips A 00242-3 L	harpsichord
Joseph & Grete Dichler	1954	Westminster XWN 2216	2 pianos
Pro Arte Kammerorchester München conducted by Kurt Redel	1955	Telefunken LT 6535-6 AC	orchestra
Helmut Walcha	1956	Archiv Produktion 463 712-2	organ
Ars Rediviva conducted by Milan Munclinger	1959-1966	Supraphon SV 8368-69	orchestra
Collegium Aureum	1962	Deutsche Harmonia Mundi 0287 670047-2	chamber ensemble
Glenn Gould	1962, 1967 & 1981	Sony Classical SMK 52 595	organ (1962: Contrapunctus 1–9) and piano (1967: Contrapunctus 9, 11 & 13 [rectus]; 1981: Contrapunctus 1, 2, 4 & 14)
Fine Arts String Quartet and New York Woodwind Quintet	1962	Saga XID5302/3	string quartet and woodwind quintet
Konrad Philipp Schuba	1962	Christophorus SFKLP 78073	organ
Ensemble Wolfgang von Karajan	1963	André Charlin AMS 44/45	organ (on three chamber organs)
Kammerorchester des Saarländischen Rundfunks conducted by Karl Ristenpart	1963	Erato STU 70188-70189	orchestra with Huguette Dreyfus, harpsichord
Members of Philomusica of London conducted by George Malcolm	1964	Decca Eloquence 482 5187	orchestra
Stuttgart Chamber Orchestra conducted by Karl Münchinger	1965	Decca 467 267-2	orchestra
Orchestre de la RTSI conducted by Hermann Scherchen	1965	Accord 200412	orchestra with Luciano Sgrizzi, harpsichord
Vienna Symphony Orchestra and members of the Vienna Radio Orchestra conducted by Hermann Scherchen	1965	MCA Records MCAD2-80352	orchestra with Herbert Tachezi, harpsichord
CBC Toronto Chamber Orchestra conducted by Hermann Scherchen	1965	Tahra	orchestra with Kenneth Gilbert, harpsichord
Kammerorchester des Saarländischen Rundfunks conducted by Karl Ristenpart	1966	Nonesuch HB-73013	orchestra (adapted for orchestra by Marcel Bitsch and Claude Pascal)
Charles Rosen	1967	Sony Classical SB2K-62331	piano
Tatiana Nikolayeva	1967	Melodiya MELCD-1002006	piano
Isolde Ahlgrimm	1967	Tudor 7030	harpsichord
Johannes-Ernst Köhler	1967	Berlin Classics 0091762BC or 0149282BC (2008 reedition)	organ
Gisbert Schneider	1967-1968	Baedeker Record TST 77 946/47	organ
Lionel Rogg	1969	EMI His Master's Voice SLS 782	organ
Gustav Leonhardt	1969	Deutsche Harmonia Mundi GD77013	harpsichord
Academy of St. Martin in the Fields conducted by Neville Marriner	1974		orchestra with Christopher Hogwood, harpsichord
Yuji Takahashi	1975	Columbia	electronic version (incomplete)
Wolfgang Rübsam	1976	Philips Classics 438 170-2	organ
Herbert Tachezi	1977	TELDEC 243 541-2	organ
Musica Rediviva conducted by Ludovic Bàcs	1979	Electrecord STM-ECE 01306/01307	orchestra
Ars Rediviva conducted by Milan Munclinger	1979	Supraphon 1411 2971-2	orchestra
Grigory Sokolov	1982	Melodiya RCID26063363	piano
Neues Bachisches Collegium Musicum conducted by Max Pommer	1983	Capriccio 10 026/1-2	orchestra
Zoltán Kocsis	1984	Philips Classics 412 729-2	piano
Musica Antiqua Köln (director Reinhard Goebel)	1984	Deutsche Grammophon 463027-2	string quartet/harpsichord and various such instrumental combinations
Davitt Moroney	1985	Harmonia Mundi HMG50116970	harpsichord
Quartetto Italiano	1985	Nuova Era 7342	string quartet
Franz Liszt Chamber Orchestra conducted by János Rolla)	1985	Hungaroton 12810/11-2	orchestra with Miklós Spányi, harpsichord
Jordi Savall with Hesperion XX	1986	Astrée E-2001/E-2002	orchestra
Juilliard String Quartet	1987	Sony Classical S2K 45 937	string quartet
The Canadian Brass	1987	CBS Masterworks MK 44501	brass quintet
Felix Gottlieb	1987	Melodiya 10 10 01645	harpsichord
David Lively	1988	BNL Productions 112729	piano
Yuji Takahashi	1988	Lontec Music	piano (earlier version of the autograph score)
Kenneth Gilbert	1989	Archiv Produktion	harpsichord (earlier version of the autograph score)
Evgeni Koroliov	1990	Tacet 13	piano
Barbara Harbach	1990	Gasparo (1990) or MSR Classics MS-1442 (2014 reedition)	organ
Berliner Saxophon Quartett	1990	CPO 999 058-2	saxophone quartet
Cluj Philharmonic Orchestra conducted by Erich Bergel	1991	Budapest Music Center 011	orchestra
Tatiana Nikolayeva	1992	Hyperion CDA-66631/2	piano
Josef Popelka and Zuzana Němečková	1992	Bonton 71 0107-2	organ
Wolfgang Rübsam	1992	Naxos 8.550703/04	organ
Marie-Claire Alain	1993	Erato 4509-91946-2	organ
Louis Thiry	1993	Studio SM 12 22.15	organ (Silbermann organ of Saint Thomas Church, Strasbourg)
Ton Koopman and Tini Mathot	1994	Erato 0630-16173-2	harpsichords
Andrei Vieru	1994	INA IMV025	piano
Vladimir Feltsman	1996	Nimbus NI 2549/50	piano
Keller Quartet (German)	1997	ECM 1652	string quartet
Amsterdam Loeki Stardust Quartet	1998	Channel Classics CCS12698	recorder quartet
Phantasm (director: Laurence Dreyfus)	1998	Simax PSC 1135	viola da gamba four-part consort. Excerpts : movements 1 to 11 and 19
Robert Hill	1998	Hänssler Classic 92.134	harpsichord
Rinaldo Alessandrini and Concerto Italiano	1998	Naïve OP30191	orchestra
André Isoir	1999	La Dolce Volta LDV200 or LDV515 (reedition)	organ. Some movements performed as a duet with Pierre Farago, on the Grenzing organ of Saint-Cyprien in Périgord, France
Menno van Delft	1999	Brilliant Classics 99372-8	harpsichord
Hans Fagius	2000	BIS 1034	organ (on the Carsten Lund organ of the Garnisons Church, Copenhagen, Denmark)
Delmé Quartet	2000	Hyperion 67138	string quartet (arranged by composer Robert Simpson, including versions of Contrapuntus XIV unfinished and completed following Tovey's version)
Kevin Bowyer	2001	Nimbus Records NI 5738/40	organ (on the Marcussen organ of Saint Hans Church, Odense, Denmark)
Peter Elyakim Taussig	2001	Pilgrim Records	piano
József Eötvös	2002	Self-published EJ-06WZ	two eight-string guitars
Fretwork	2002	Harmonia Mundi HMU907296	consort of Viols
Stuttgart Chamber Orchestra conducted by Karl Münchinger	2002	Decca E4672672	orchestra
Emerson Quartet	2003	Deutsche Grammophon 4744952	string quartet
Pieter Dirksen	2003	Etcetera KTC1348	harpsichord
New Century Saxophone Quartet	2004	Channel Classics CCS SA 20204	saxophone quartet
Aurelia Saxophone Quartet	2005	Challenge Classics CC72148	saxophone quartet
The Version of Jacques Chailley instrumentation of Pascal Vigneron	2005		wind quartet, brass quartet and organ
Sébastian Guillot	2006	Naxos 8.557796	harpsichord
Walter Riemer	2006	ORF	fortepiano (using a fortepiano of Mozart type)
Bradley Brookshire	2007	Bach Harpsichord BHI1080	harpsichord (includes an additional CD-ROM with score to follow along as MP3s play)
Gösta Funck	2007	Classic Concert Record CCR-42408	harpsichord (Christian Zell, 1728)
Laibachkunstderfuge, by Neue Slowenische Kunst industrial band Laibach	2008		electronic version
An electronic version by Jeffrey C Hall	2007?		
Pierre-Laurent Aimard	2008	Deutsche Grammophon 4794381	piano
Sergio Vartolo	2008	Naxos 8.570577-78	harpsichord
Gavin Black & George Hazelrigg	2009	Outer Marker Records OM07100H	harpsichords (on two harpsichords with voices shared equally throughout)
Akademie für Alte Musik Berlin	2011	Harmonia Mundi HMC902064	orchestra
Angela Hewitt	2014	Hyperion CDA67980	piano
Martha Cook	2015	Passacaille PAS1014	harpsichord
Schaghajegh Nosrati	2015	Genuin GEN15374	piano
Marco Angius with Orchestra di Padova e del Veneto	2015	Stradivarius STR37008	orchestra (adapted for orchestra by Hermann Scherchen)
Roberto Giordano	2015	La Bottega Discantica BDI287	piano
Rachel Podger and Brecon Baroque	2015	Channel CCSSA38316	string quartet/harpsichord and various such instrumental combinations
Jörg Abbing	2016	IFO ORG7260	organ
Stephanie Ho and Saar Ahuvia	2016	New Focus FCR181	piano duo
FM_Kantor	2016	Die Verkehrung der Fuge	Yamaha DX7, Yamaha TX7 synthesizers
The Art of Fugue	2016	Oehms OC1854	violin, viola, cello, bassoon, and contrabass
Kimiko Douglass-Ishizaka, including her own completion to the final fugue	2017		piano
Accademia Bizantina (director Ottavio Dantone)	2017	Decca 4832329	string quartet/harpsichord and various such instrumental combinations
Quintaessentia	2017	ARS Produktion ARS38230	recorder quartet
Wolfgang Rubsam	2017	Counterpoint Records CR23351/52	Lautenwerk (lute-harpsichord)
Bálint Karosi	2017	Hungaroton HCD32784-85	organ, harpsichord and clavichord
Bob van Asperen	2018	Aeolus AE10154	harpsichord
Vincent Grappy	2018	Hortus 246748	organ
Berlin Saxophone Quartet	2018	CPO 555162-1	saxophone quartet
Matthias Maierhofer	2019	Ambiente 2037	organ
Pieter-Jan Belder	2019	Brilliant Classics 96035	harpsichord/clavichord
Samuel Kummer	2020	Aeolus AE11291	organ
Evan Shinners	2020	The W.T.F. Bach Podcast	piano/organ/synthesizer
Les inAttendus	2021	Harmonia Mundi HMM905313	chamber ensemble
Margaret Phillips (musician)	2021	Regent REGCD558	organ
Salzburg Chamber Soloists	2021	Gramola 98009	string orchestra
Aston Magna (ensemble)	2021	Centaur CRC3851	chamber ensemble
Geoffrey Douglas Madge	2021	Zefir ZEF9683	piano
Eloise Bella Kohn	2021	Hänssler HC21049	piano
Filippo Gorini	2021	Alpha 755	piano
Kenneth Weiss	2022	Paraty PTY12211115	harpsichord
Maurizio Ricci	2023	Casa Musicale Eco 860272	organ
New Collegium	2023	Ramée RAM2208	chamber ensemble
Noël Akchoté	2023	NoA OWSG-000	guitar
Cuarteto Casals	2023	Harmonia Mundi HMM902717	string quartet
Les Récréations	2023	Ricercar RIC453	chamber ensemble
Christophe Rousset	2023	Aparté AP313	harpsichord
Andrzej Ślązak	2023	DUX 2053-54	piano
Anatolii Trushin: Die Kunst Der Fuge (272 Jahre Der Ersten Ausgabe)	2023	Anatolii Trushin	harpsichord
Aapo Häkkinen	2024	Ondine ODE1437-2	harpsichord
Masaaki Suzuki	2024	BIS 2531	harpsichord
Quartetto di Cremona	2024	Orchid Classics ORC100342	string quartet
Paul Suits; completion of Contrapunctus XIX by Nikolaus Matthes	2024	resonando rn-10020	piano
Vulfmon (featuring Michael Winograd)	2024	VV006	clarinet

- Without recording date – to be inserted in the list

== Sources ==
- http://www.jsbach.org/1080.html
- https://www.bach-cantatas.com/NVD/BWV1080.htm#Rec
