= František Sláma (musician) =

Czech musician (1923–2004)

- Born: František Sláma; 19 November 1923; Herálec, Czechoslovakia
- Died: 5 May 2004 (aged 80) Říčany, Czech Republic
- Genres: Classical
- Occupation: Cellist
- Instruments: Cello, viola da gamba
- Years active: 1946–1997

František Sláma (19 November 1923 – 5 May 2004) was a Czech chamber music performer. He was the first Czech cellist who focused on Early music.

== Biography ==
Sláma was born in Herálec. Until the age of 18 he worked in the quarry. His meeting with the famous Czech cello pedagogue Karel P. Sádlo proved to be a turning point in his life. Sádlo supported him, introduced him to the cello (1941) and tutored him for the Conservatoire (1942–1948, cello with K. P. Sádlo, chamber music with Václav Talich). Between 1948 and 1952 Sláma completed his studies at the Academy of Performing Arts in Prague. By this time he had already been a member of the Czech Philharmonic Orchestra (1948–1981, since 1962 sub-principal cello and cello section leader).

Conductor Václav Talich encouraged Sláma's enthusiasm for chamber music and had, along with K. P. Sádlo and later Milan Munclinger, a lasting influence on Sláma's musical development. During the next 45 years Sláma performed with leading chamber ensembles in Czechoslovakia. In 1946 he was a founding member of Talich's Czech Chamber Orchestra, between 1953–1976 the viol da gambist of Pro Arte Antiqua (one of the oldest European ensembles focused on medieval and Renaissance music) and between 1954–1997 a member of the ensemble Ars Rediviva (led by Munclinger), whose performances and recordings on Supraphon played an important role in the revival of the Baroque music in Czechoslovakia. After Munclinger died in 1986, Sláma succeeded him in leading the ensemble.

With these ensembles he made a large number of recordings (with Supraphon, Panton, Columbia, DGG, Ariola, and Nippon), which received several awards both in Czechoslovakia and abroad (e.g. Grand Prix du Disque). He participated also in first performances of modern compositions (e.g. Ilja Hurník: Sonata da camera, Jan Tausinger: Evocations).

== Pedagogue and publicist ==
Since the 1970s he has been a teacher at the Conservatoire in Prague. He also wrote about music and musicians, cooperated with Czech Radio (e.g. introduced Jordi Savall to the Czech audience).
In 2001 his book "Z Herálce do Šangrilá a zase nazpátek" (“From Heralec to Shangrila and Back Again”) was published - reminiscences about the Prague music scene between the 1940s and the 1990s as well as about Sláma's musical colleagues, conductors (Talich, Barbirolli, Cluytens, Karajan, Kleiber, Klemperer, Kletzki, Kubelík, Maazel, Mackerras, Markevitch, Matačić, Mravinsky, Münch, Pedrotti, Rozhdestvensky, Sawallisch, Stokowski, etc.) and other personalities whom he had met (e.g. Adorján, André, Fournier, Honegger, Mainardi, Menuhin, Milhaud, Navarra, Nureyev, Oistrakh, Rampal, Richter, Szeryng, Sudek, Tortelier).

== František Sláma archive ==
František Sláma archive collection donated to his native village Herálec consists of more than 5,000 negatives and photos, over 150 hours of authentic recordings and documents about Czech Philharmonic Orchestra, Václav Talich, Milan Muclinger, Ars Rediviva, etc. Live recordings of Ars Rediviva performances in Rudolfinum are also deposited in the Czech Music Museum (see: External links).
