= Ars Rediviva =

Czech classical music group

- Also known as: Ars Rediviva Prague
- Origin: Prague, Czech Republic
- Genres: Classical
- Occupation: Chamber music ensemble/Chamber orchestra
- Years active: 1951–2002
- Labels: Supraphon; Panton; Columbia, Deutsche Grammophon; CBS Masterworks; Nippon; Sony Classical
- Past members: Conductor, artistic director, flute Milan Munclinger; Oboe; Stanislav Duchoň; Cello; František Sláma; Harpsichord; Viktorie Švihlíková

Ars Rediviva was a Czech classical instrumental music group, whose historically informed performances played a key role in the revival of Baroque music in Czechoslovakia.

== Ars Rediviva chamber ensemble ==
The group was founded in 1951 in Prague by flautist and musicologist Milan Munclinger and his wife, pianist and harpsichordist Viktorie Švihlíková (who was later succeeded by Josef Hála). The original lineup also consisted of two prominent members of the Czech Philharmonic, cellist František Sláma and oboist Stanislav Duchoň (later succeeded by violinists Václav Snítil and Antonín Novák).

From 1951 to 1956, Václav Talich collaborated with Ars Rediviva. After Munclinger died in 1986, František Sláma succeeded him in leading the ensemble.

== Orchestra, soloists ==
The band's repertoire consisted largely of chamber music, particularly the works of Johann Sebastian Bach. Depending on score requirements, the ensemble's size expanded regularly up to the chamber orchestra, with primarily Czech Philharmonic instrumentalists as members. These groups would often include string players and wind instruments (e.g., flautists Géza Novák and František Čech, oboist Jiří Mihule, bassoonists Karel Bidlo and František Herman, and horn players Miroslav Štefek and Zdeněk Tylšar).

Ars Rediviva collaborated with the Czech Philharmonic Choir, Czech singers (Karel Berman, Ladislav Mráz, Jana Jonášová, Virginia Walterová, Ludmila Vernerová, etc.), and foreign artists, specializing in performances of Baroque and Classical music (e.g. András Adorján, Theo Altmeyer, Maurice André, Nedda Casei, Otto Peter, Jean-Pierre Rampal).

== Season performances (1954–1994) ==
In 1954, the ensemble started giving season performances in Wallenstein Palace, later moving to Rudolfinum. At first, they gave six concerts per year and eventually expanded to twelve. In four decades, several hundred compositions were introduced here, including scores of premiered archive pieces. Live recordings of Ars Rediviva performances in Rudolfinum are deposited in the Czech Museum of Music.

== Repertoire, recordings ==
Ars Rediviva was the first ensemble in Czechoslovakia to record a large number of works by Bach. These included LPs of the complete Brandenburg Concertos, the Art of Fugue, the Musical Offering, trio sonatas, flute sonatas, cantatas, concerto reconstructions, etc. They also recorded the music of Bach's sons (Carl Philipp Emanuel Bach: sonatas, symphonies, concerts; Wilhelm Friedemann Bach: symphonies, sonatas; Johann Christian Bach: chamber music, symphonies), Antonio Vivaldi (concertos, sonatas, Stabat Mater), Jean-Philippe Rameau (e.g., Pièces en Concerts), François Couperin (Les Apothéoses, Les Goûts réunis), Georg Philipp Telemann (concertos, orchestral suites, Nouveaux Quatuors, Tafelmusik, Essercizii musici, Der Harmonischer Gottes-Dienst, cantatas), Jan Dismas Zelenka (trio sonatas ZWV 181, orchestral works, Lamentationes Jeremiae Prophetae), Franz Benda (sonatas, flute concertos), Georg Benda (Ariadne auf Naxos, Bendas Klage, sonatas, concertos), and others (see § External links).

The ensemble recorded for Supraphon, Panton, Columbia, Ariola, CBS, Orfeo, Nippon, Deutsche Grammophon, Sony, as well as for broadcasting and television companies and film industry (awards: Grand Prix du Disque, Supraphon Golden Lion, etc.).

Jan Tausinger, Ivan Jirko, Ilja Hurník, and other Czech composers dedicated their neoclassical compositions to Ars Rediviva (e.g., Hurník's Sonata da Camera, Concerto for Flute and Chamber Orchestra.
