= Hurník =

Hurník can refer to

- Ilja Hurník (1922–2013), a Czech composer
- Lukáš Hurník (born 1967), a Czech composer
- 16929 Hurník, an asteroid named after Ilja Hurník.
