= Ulrich Drüner =

German musicologist and orchestra musician

Ulrich Drüner (born 1943 in Thann, Haut-Rhin) is a German musicologist and orchestra musician.

Drüner studied music and musicology from 1963 to 1969. After his beginnings with the Stuttgart Chamber Orchestra, he was a viola player in the orchestra of the Stuttgart State Opera. In addition to this career, Drüner founded a music antiquarian bookshop in 1983 and completed his doctorate on Richard Wagner in 1987. The critical examination of this composer, especially from a philosophical and ideological point of view, remained the focus of Drüner's scientific and literary activities in the following decades.

== Publications ==
- 400 Jahre Staatsorchester Stuttgart 1593-1993.
- Schöpfer und Zerstörer. Richard Wagner als Künstler. Cologne/Weimar/Vienna 2003, ISBN 978-3-4121-7702-7.
- Mozarts Große Reise. Sein Durchbruch zum Genie 1777–1779. Böhlau, Cologne/Weimar/Vienna 2006, ISBN 978-3-4123-4805-2.
- Musik und "Drittes Reich". Fallbeispiele 1910 bis 1960 zu Herkunft, Höhepunkt und Nachwirkungen des Nationalsozialismus in der Musik. Böhlau, Cologne/Weimar/Vienna 2012, ISBN 978-3-2057-8616-0.
- Richard Wagner. Die Inszenierung eines Lebens. Blessing, Munich 2016, ISBN 978-3-8966-7563-7.
