= Maierhofer =

Maierhofer is a surname. Notable people with the surname include:

- Franz Maierhofer (1897–1943), German Nazi Gauleiter
- Matthias Maierhofer (born 1979), Austrian musician
- Monika Maierhofer (born 1967), Austrian alpine skier
- Rico Maierhofer (born 1987), Filipino basketball player
- Ron Maierhofer (born 1935), American soccer player
- Sophie Maierhofer (born 1996), Austrian footballer
- Stefan Maierhofer (born 1982), Austrian footballer
- Sandro Maierhofer (born 1985), Liechtensteiner football player
