= Pustkovec =

Borough of Ostrava, Czech Republic

- Borough of Ostrava
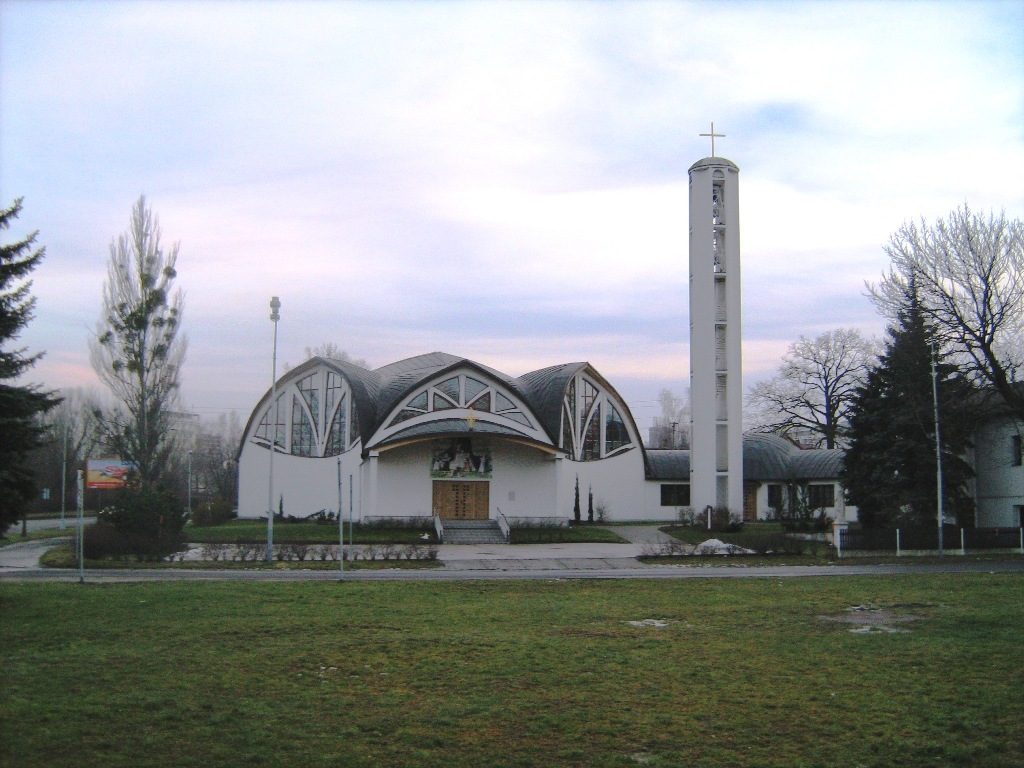
- Church of Saints Cyril and Methodius

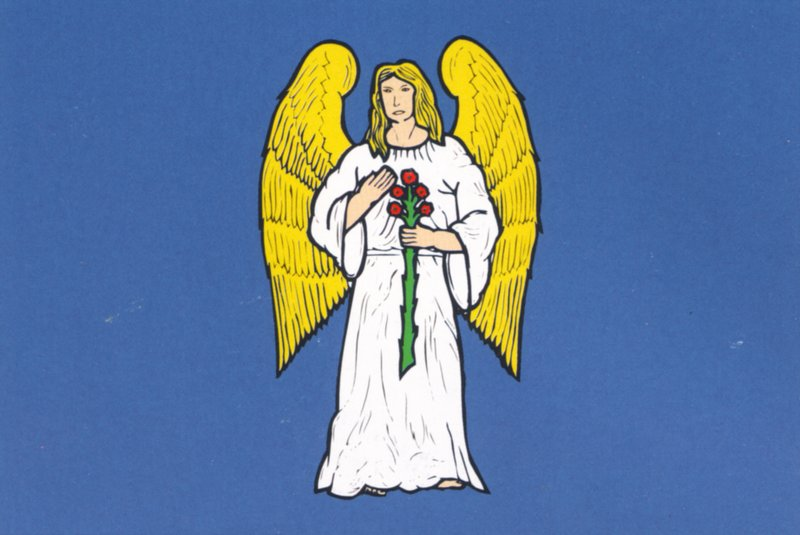
- Flag Coat of arms

- Location of Pustkovec in Ostrava
- Coordinates: 49°50′29″N 18°10′2″E
- Country: Czech Republic
- Region: Moravian-Silesian
- Municipality: Ostrava

Area
  - Total: 1.07 km^{2} (0.41 sq mi)

Population (2021)
  - Total: 1,312
  - Density: 1,230/km^{2} (3,180/sq mi)
- Time zone: UTC+1 (CET)
  - Summer (DST): UTC+2 (CEST)
- Postal code: 708 00
- Website: pustkovec.ostrava.cz

Pustkovec is a borough and municipal part of the city of Ostrava in the Czech Republic. It is situated in the north-western part of the city. Originally a separate municipality, it was incorporated into Ostrava in 1954, and in 1957 it merged with the borough Poruba. On 24 November 1990, it separated from Poruba and became one of the 23 self-governing boroughs of Ostrava. Pustkovec is the smallest borough of Ostrava by area.

== Etymology ==
The name is derived from the Old Czech name Pustimír and its diminutive form Pustek. By adding the possessive suffix -ovec, it became Pustkovec, meaning "Pustek's settlement".

== Gallery ==
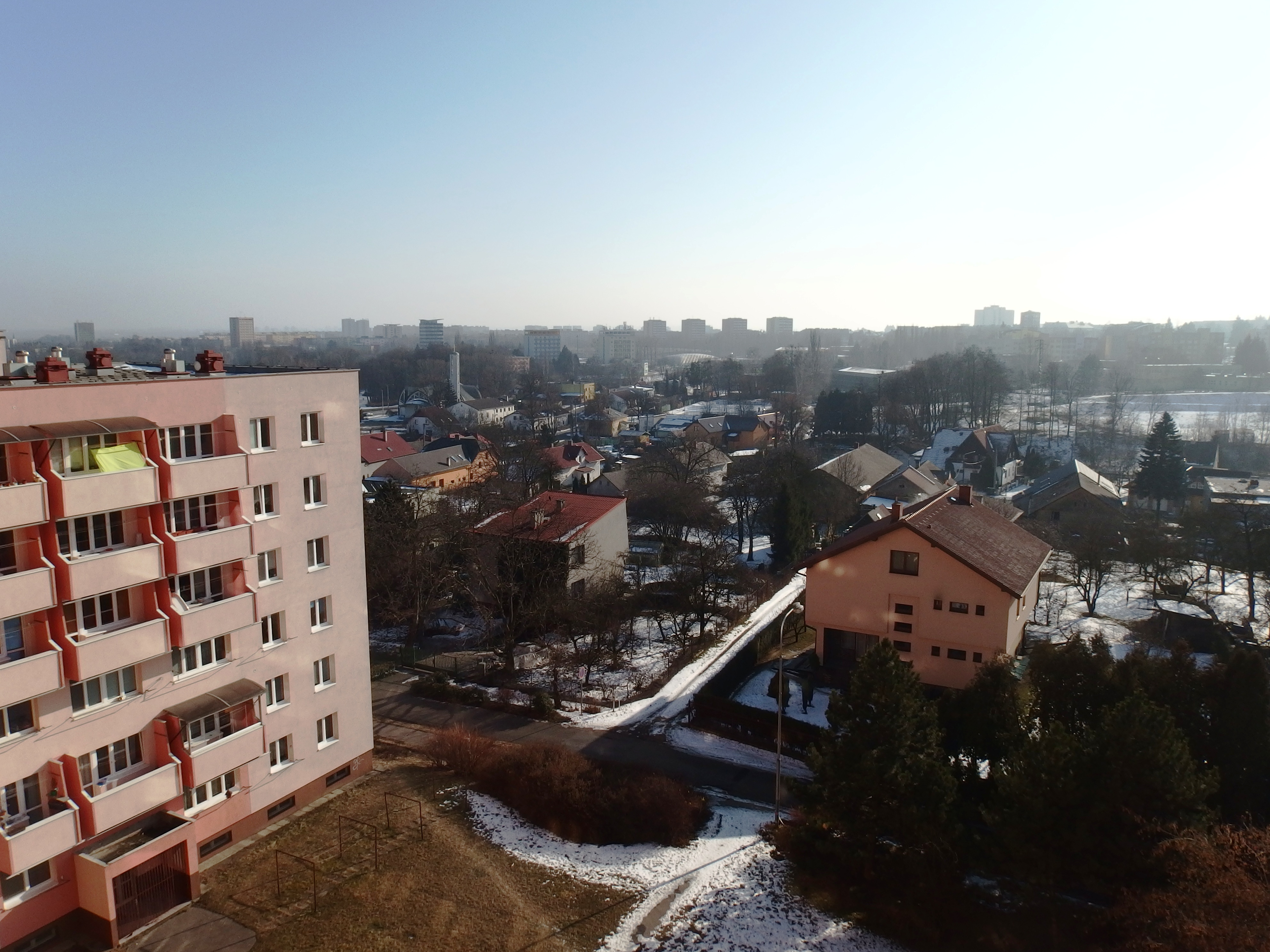
Aerial view of Pustovec

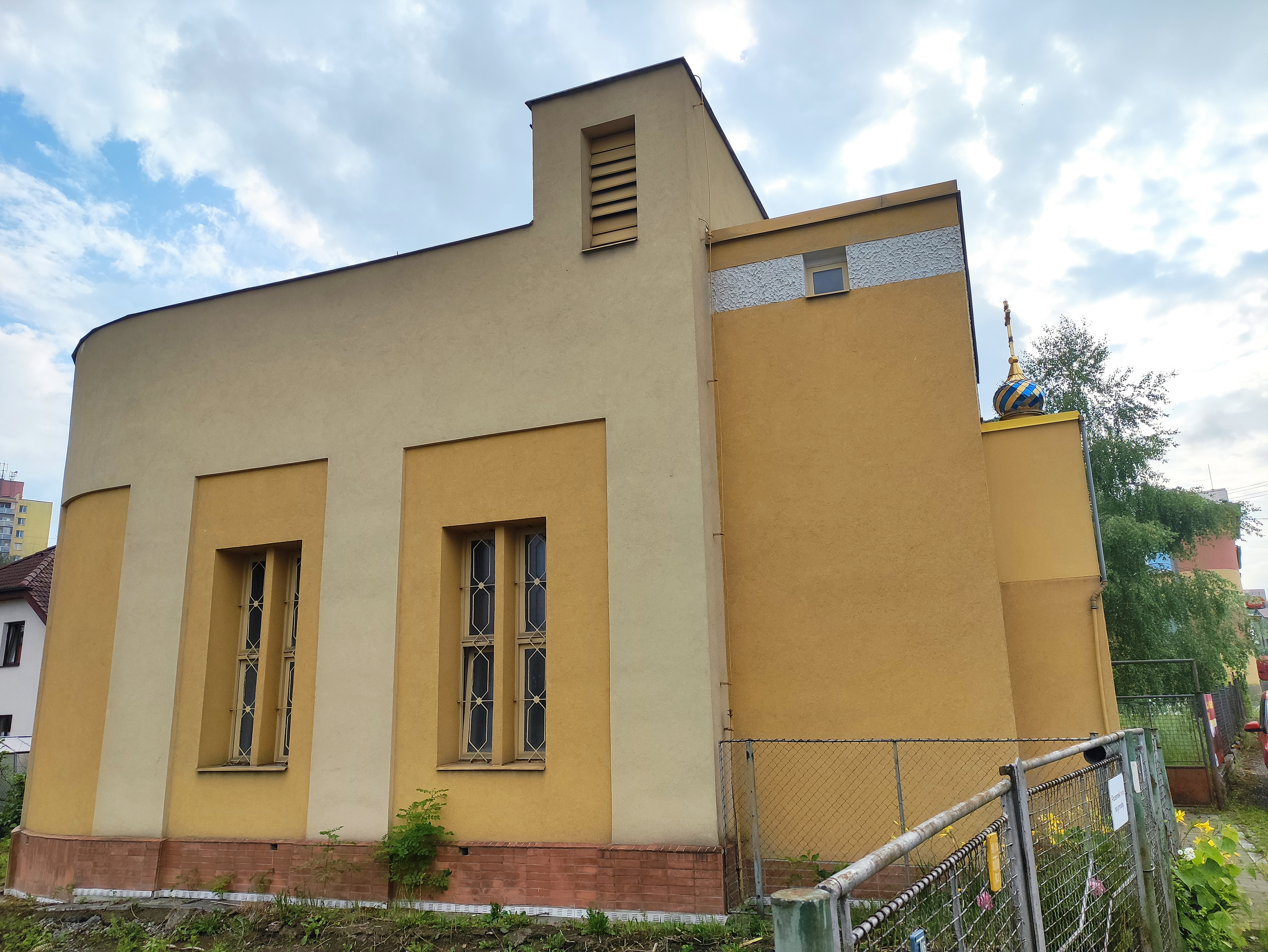
Chapel

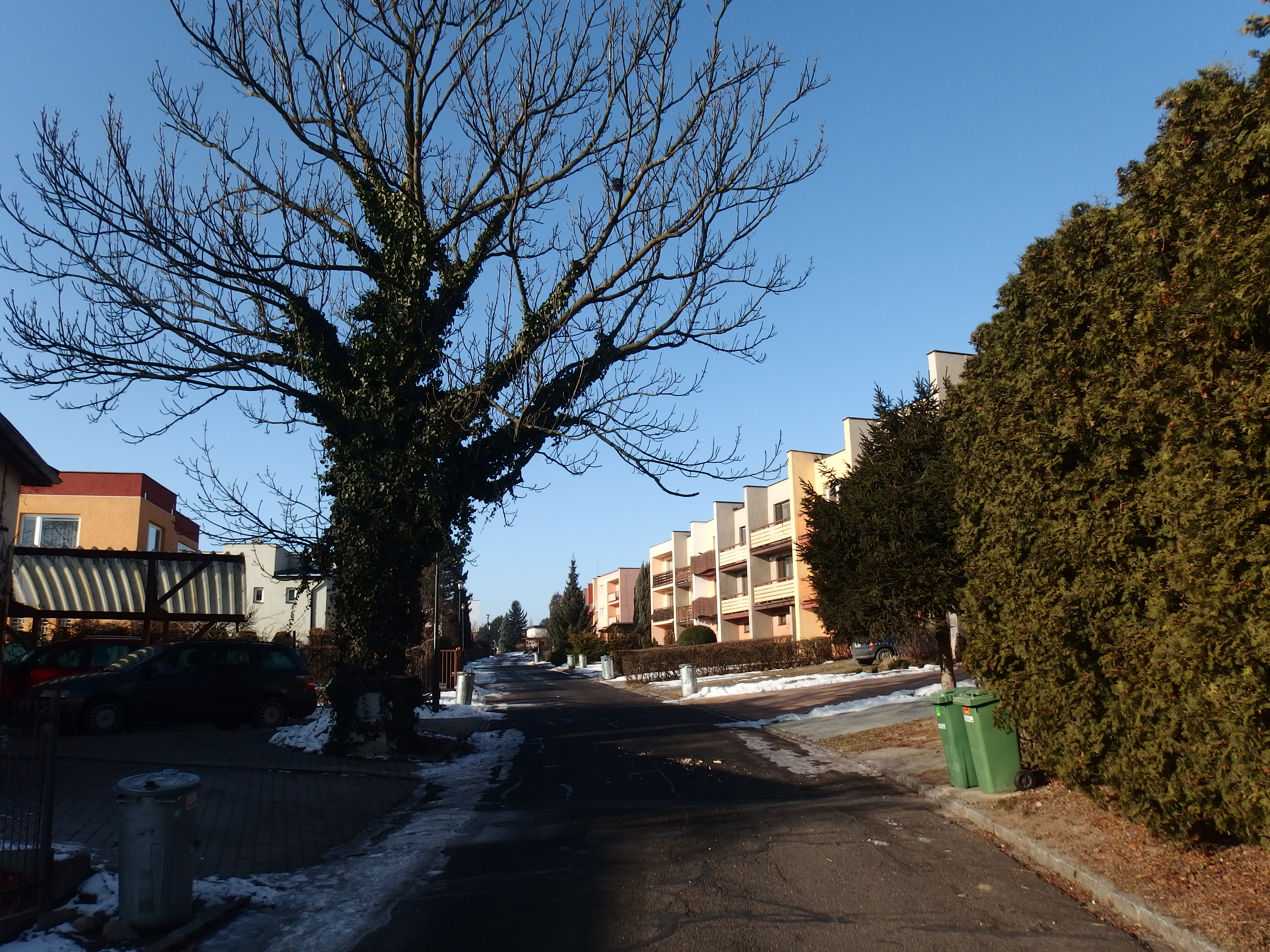
Plk. Rajmunda Prchaly street
