= Otto Peter =

Swiss classical baritone (born 1931)

Otto Peter (born 1931) is a Swiss classical baritone. He studied with the composer Paul Hindemith, the Swiss violinist of Czech origin Petr Rybář, and singers Margherita Perras and Heinz Rehfuss. He became famous as an interpreter of the music of Johann Sebastian Bach and performed frequently with the Zürcher Bach Chor. He was particularly active in Prague during the 1960s and 1970s where he worked frequently with the Prague Symphony Orchestra (PSO) and Ars Rediviva. With the PSO, he made recordings of the Johannes Passion and the St Matthew Passion under conductor Jindřich Rohan. He also recorded several Bach cantatas with Ars Rediviva under the baton of Milan Munclinger.

== Recordings ==
- Heinrich Schütz: Saint Luke Passion, SWV 480 – Otto Peter (Baritone), Günther Ess (Tenor), Helen Ess (Soprano), Georg Jelden (Tenor), Hans Georg Fehr (Bass); Singkreis der Engadiner Kantorei Zürich Hannes Reimann (Conductor). Label: Cantate 57622

== Sources ==
- Croucher, Trevor, Early music discography: from plainsong to the sons of Bach, Volume 1, Oryx Press, 1981. ISBN 0-85365-613-4, ISBN 978-0-85365-613-5
- Schweizerische Musikzeitung: Revue musicale suisse, Volume 109, Gesellschaft Schweizerische Musikzeitung, 1969, p. 48
- Československý hudební slovník osob a institucí, II (in Czech). Praha: State Music Publishing. 1965.
- Kozák, Jan (1964). Českoslovenští hudební umělci a komorní soubory (in Czech). Praha: State Music Publishing. pp. 427, 454, 479.
