= Herálec =

Herálec may refer to places in the Czech Republic:

- Herálec (Havlíčkův Brod District), a municipality and village in the Vysočina Region
- Herálec (Žďár nad Sázavou District), a municipality and village in the Vysočina Region
