= Antonio Pedrotti =

Italian composer and conductor

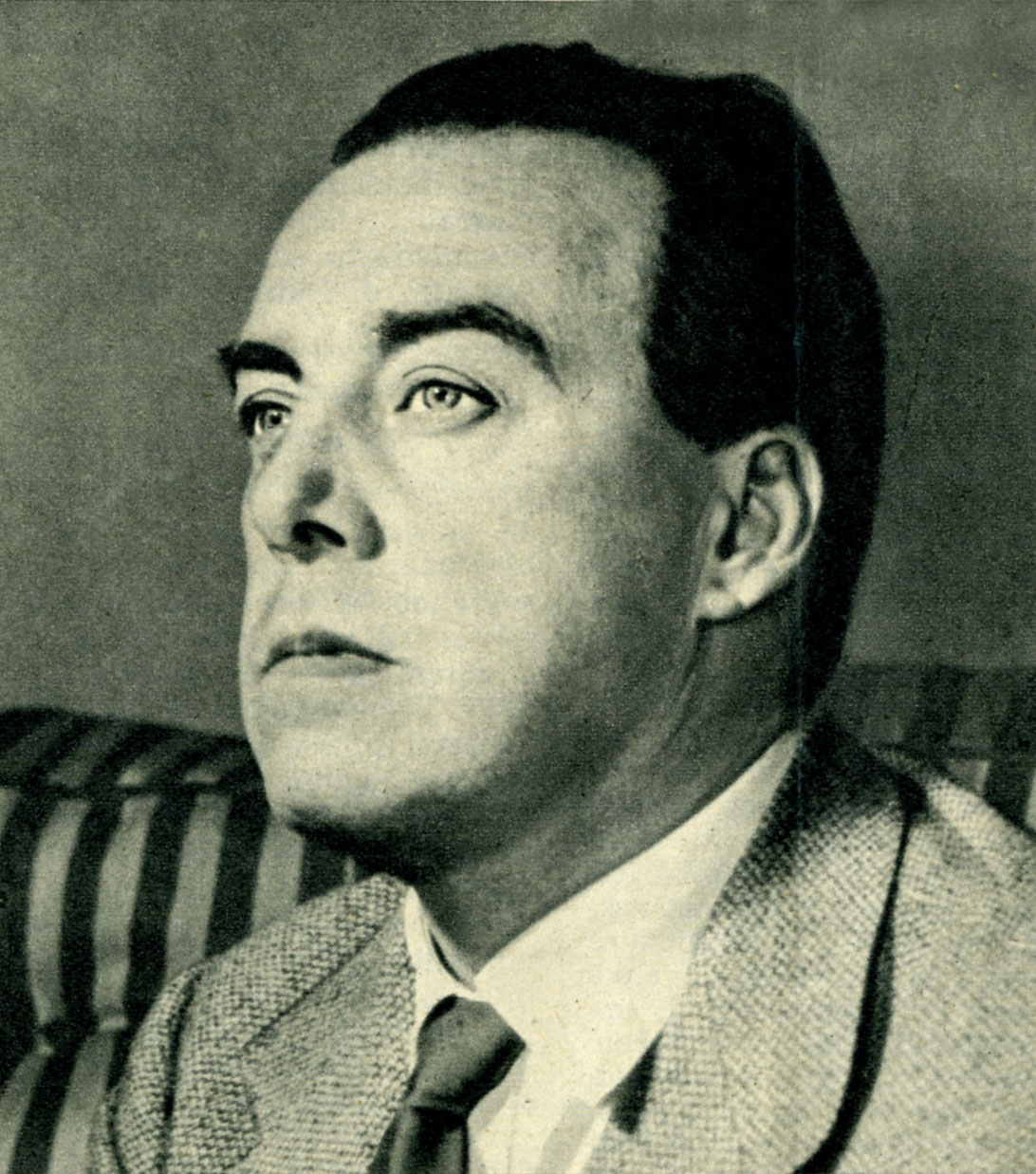
Antonio Pedrotti (1956)

Antonio Pedrotti (August 14, 1901 – May 15, 1975 in Trento) was an Italian conductor and composer.

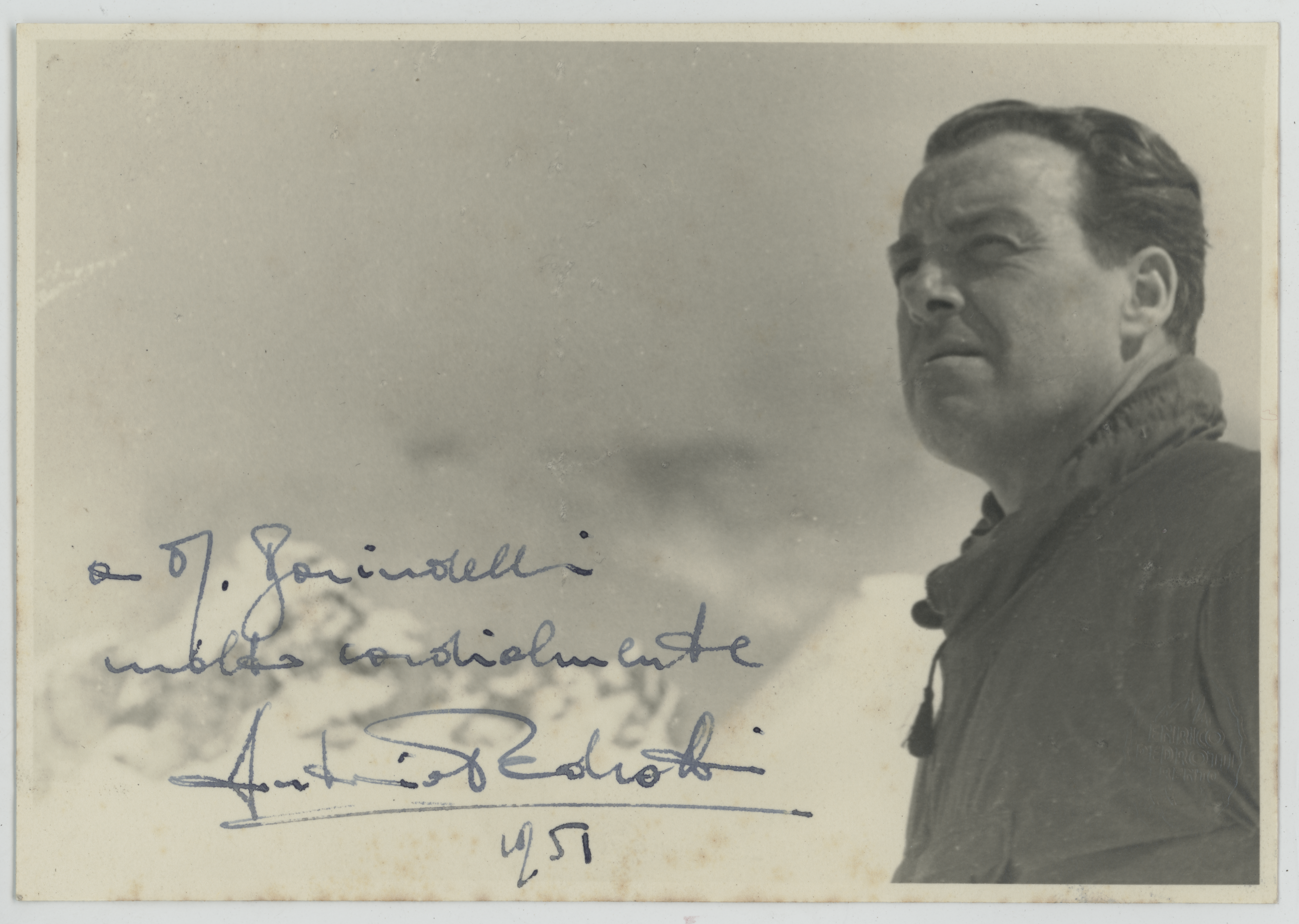
Antonio Pedrotti (photo with 1950s dedication)

He was born in Trento, at the time part of the County of Tyrol, part of the Austrian Empire. He studied literature at the university and music at the conservatory in Rome. In 1924 he completed his composition studies under Ottorino Respighi and continued studying conducting with Bernardino Molinari. From 1938 to 1944 he was Molinari's assistant and co-director of Orchestra dell'Accademia Nazionale di Santa Cecilia. He also collaborated with La Scala and l'Orchestra dell'Angelicum in Milan as well as with the Vienna State Opera and with soloists like Arturo Benedetti Michelangeli or David Oistrakh.

According to the family tradition, he supported the musical life in his home town and became conductor of the philharmonic orchestra and director of the conservatory ("Liceo Musicale") in Trento. As a composer, he also collaborated with the SAT men's chorus Trento. Since 1989, an international conducting competition takes place every year in that city in his honour ("Concorso internazionale per Direttori d'Orchestra Antonio Pedrotti").

Pedrotti also had a long association with orchestras in then Czechoslovakia. From 1950 to 1972 he was a frequent guest conductor of the Czech Philharmonic, Prague Symphony Orchestra, Prague Radio Symphony Orchestra (SOČR) and Slovak Philharmonic, with whom he made a large number of outstanding performances and recordings (over twenty first Czech recordings of compositions of Johannes Brahms, Gustav Mahler, Maurice Ravel, Claude Debussy, Giovanni Pierluigi da Palestrina, Antonio Vivaldi, Modest Musorgsky, Ottorino Respighi, Béla Bartók, Igor Stravinsky etc.). With the Czech Philharmonic he collaborated more than forty times, including concerts in Switzerland and Great Britain (London).

He was well respected particularly for his interpretations of impressionistic and classical music. His way of working with the orchestra as well as his intellect, imagination and sense of facture and colour continued Václav Talich's tradition and played an important role in the development of the Czech Philharmonic.
