= Nedda Casei =

American singer (1932–2020)

Nedda Casei (September 9, 1932 – January 20, 2020) was an American operatic mezzo-soprano.

== Career ==
Early in her career, Casei was selected by Leopold Stokowski to sing the role of Jocasta, in Igor Stravinsky's Oedipus Rex. She made her operatic debut at the Theatre Royal de la Monnaie, Brussels in 1960 and also debuted at La Scala, Milan in the same year. During her career she appeared at the Teatro San Carlo, Prague Opera, Los Angeles Opera, Chicago Lyric Opera and other major opera houses and concert halls. She starred at the Vancouver Festival as Hansel in Hansel and Gretel, and received ovations for her interpretation of Cherubino in Le Nozze di Figaro and Musetta in Leoncavallo's La Bohème at San Remo and Barcelona's Teatro Gran Liceo, as well as Carmen at the Salzburg Festspeilhaus. She was a leading mezzo-soprano with New York's Metropolitan Opera for 21 years, her roles including Carmen, Rosina, Suzuki, Marina, Adalgisa and Cherubino. She also sang in concert and on TV throughout Europe, South Africa, Central and South America, Canada, the US, the Far East, Middle East, Australia and Japan. Casei opened the new concert hall in Taiwan with Mahler's Das Lied Von Der Erde and also appeared as Amneris in Aida for the official inauguration of the new State Opera House in Taipei. She was invited to sing as guest artist for President Lyndon Johnson on the State visit of Emperor Haile Selassie to the White House.

Casei's performances have been captured on record with conductors such as Leonard Bernstein, Martin Turnovský, Heinz Wallberg, Nello Santi, Hans Swarowsky, Milan Munclinger and Gianfranco Rivoli. Her opera recordings include Cavalleria Rusticana, Leoncavallo's La Bohème, Rigoletto, Il Trovatore and Madame Butterfly. Her other recordings include Beethoven's Missa Solemnis, Mozart's Great Mass in C Minor, J.S. Bach's Magnificat in D Major (BWV 243), Haydn's Nelson Mass and Zelenka's Lamentationes Jeremiae Prophetae.

Casei was an advocate of legislation supporting the performing arts and classical artists including work on tax reform, health insurance and copyright laws for performing artists. She was the first woman president of The American Guild of Musical Artists (AGMA), a post she held for 10 years. Casei was an active teacher of voice, having been visiting professor of Voice and Opera Staging at the Aichi Prefectural University of Fine Arts and Music, Nagoya, Japan. She gave master-classes at numerous universities, music schools and festivals as well as being a judge for many vocal contests worldwide, such as The Metropolitan Opera Regional Auditions, Fulbright Scholarships and the Rosa Ponselle International Competition for the Vocal Arts. She was also a member of the Honorary Board of the George London Foundation for Singers, the Fordham University at Lincoln Center Advisory Board, the National Association of Teachers of Singing Board (NATS) and the Songs of Love - Board Foundation.

Casei was a Guest Editor of The Opera Quarterly and has contributed articles and reviews to Aria, Opera Magazine and The Fordham Review. She was the recipient of many awards, such as the New York State Study Grant (1979, 1980, 1981), Outstanding Young Singers Award, (1959), Martha Baird Rockefeller Foundation Award (1962–64), Community Leaders and Noteworthy Americans (1975–1976) and the Woman of Achievement Award (1969).

== Death ==
Casei died on January 20, 2020, surrounded by her family and friends at the age of 87 in New York City.
