= Ludmila Vernerová =

Czech operatic soprano

- Born: 6 December 1962 (age 63); Prague, Czechoslovakia
- Genre: Opera
- Occupation: Singer
- Instrument: Vocals

Ludmila Vernerová (born 6 December 1962, Prague) is a Czech operatic soprano and the niece of the oboist Pavel Verner. After graduating from the Academy of Performing Arts in Prague, she was a regular performer at the Prague Chamber Opera in the mid 1980s. In 1987 she joined the Prague National Theatre where she performed for 12 years. Since 1999 she has been a member of the Prague State Opera. Among the many roles she has created on stage are Angelica in Orlando furioso, Belinda in Dido and Aeneas, Countess Almaviva in The Marriage of Figaro, Donna Anna in Don Giovanni, Fiordiligi in Così fan tutte, Isabella in Robert le diable, Lucy in The Beggar's Opera, Micaela in Carmen, Musetta in La bohème, Pamina in The Magic Flute, and the title roles in Alcina and Rodelinda.

Vernerová has also been highly active as a concert soloist and has performed with most of the major symphony orchestras in her native country, including the Brno Philharmonic Orchestra, the City of Prague Philharmonic Orchestra, the Czech National Symphony Orchestra, the Czech Philharmonic, the Prague Philharmonia, the Prague Philharmonic Orchestra, and the Prague Symphony Orchestra. She has also performed with a number of chamber ensembles like Ars Rediviva, Barocco sempre giovane, Camerata Nova, Trio cantabile, and Collegium flauto dolce. Her discography encompasses more than 40 recordings from both the concert and opera literature.
