= Jan Čarek =

Czechoslovak poet, essayist and literary critic

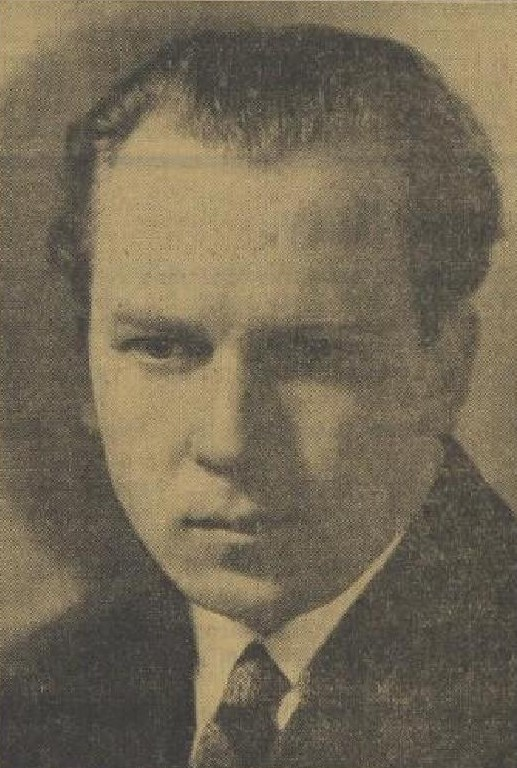
Jan Čarek

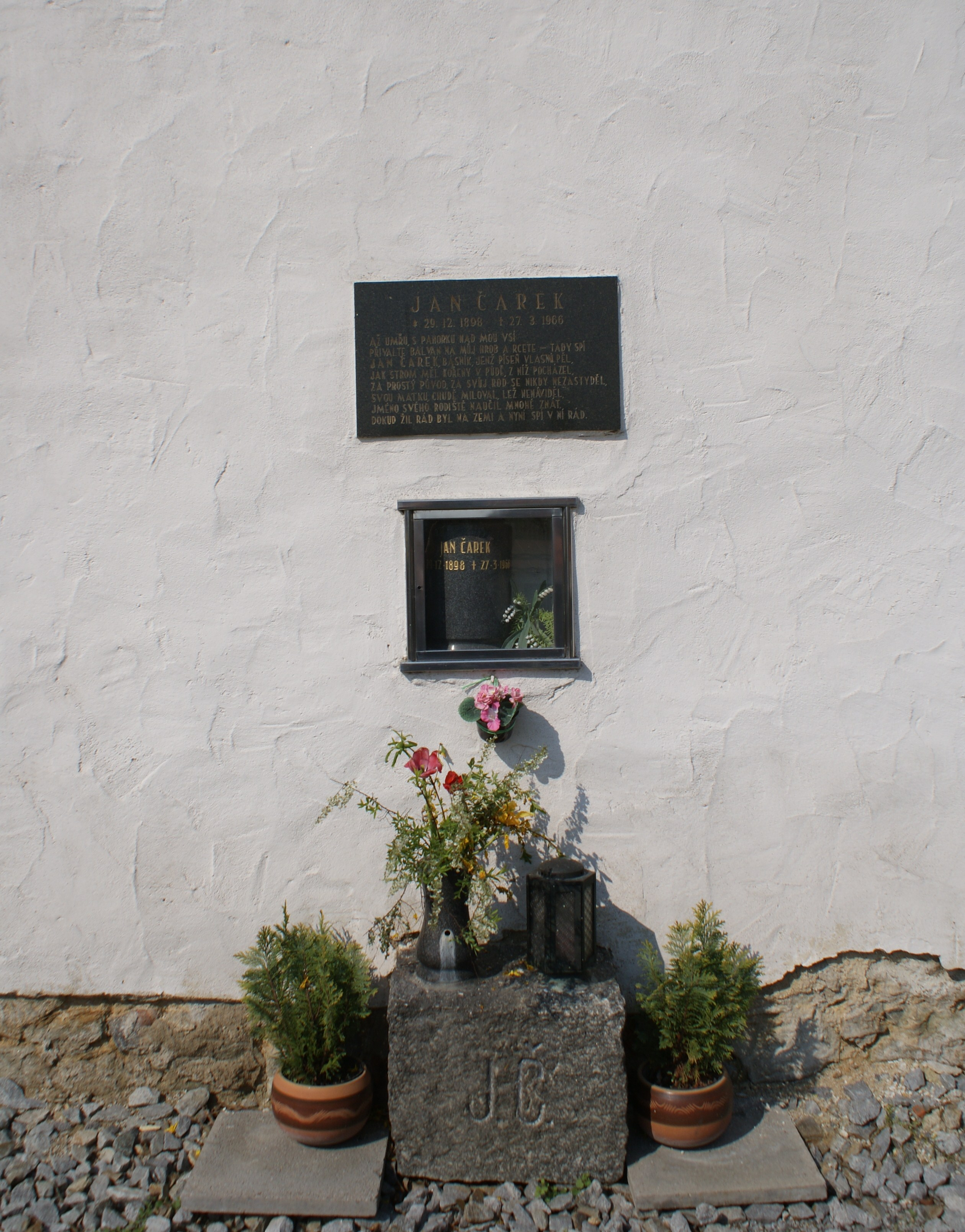
A funerary urn of Jan Čarek placed in the wall of his birthplace church in Heřmaň in South Bohemian Region.

Jan Čarek (29 December 1898, in Heřmaň, Austria-Hungary, now Czech Republic – 27 March 1966, in Prague, Czechoslovakia) was a Czechoslovak poet, essayist, and literary critic. He was greatly popular in his day for his children's books a "rural" poetry.

== Biography ==
From 1910 to 1918 he studied at the gymnasium in Písek. He was initially working as a railway clerk. Since 1946 he started his professional writer career.

Since the 1920s he regularly published his works in a number of Czech literary magazines. After 1948 he devoted himself almost exclusively to children's literature.

== Works ==
- Vojna, 1920
- Chudá rodina z Heřmaně, 1924
- Temno v chalupách, 1926
- Smutný život, 1929
- Tři baldy o válce, 1934
- Hvězdy na nebi, 1934
- Balada o Kýrovi, 1934
- Všechny chalupy,. 1936
- Tváří k vesnici, 1938
- Svatozář, 1939
- Devítiocasá kočka, 1936
- Básně rolníků, 1939
- Temno v chalupách, 1941
- O životě a literatuře, 1941
- Maminka, 1941
- V zemi české, 1942
- Na špičku nože, 1943
- Železná panna, 1946
- Mezi dvěma ohni, 1947
- Dopis na věčnost, 1947
- Ráj domova, 1948
- Jan Opolský, 1949
- Heřmaň, 1952
- Zvířátka – naši přátelé, 1953
- Zlatý dětský věk, 1953
- Bajky o nástrojích, 1953
- Radost nad radost, 1954
- Náš jeden rok, 1954
- Máš rád stromy? 1954
- Co si povídaly stroje, 1955
- Ovoce, ovoce na naší zahrádce, 1957
- Co zvířátka dovedou, 1957
- Bylo – nebylo, 1957
- Veselý věneček, 1958
- Svíce potěšení, 1958
- Dobrý den, zvířátka, 1958
- Od jehly k mašinkám, 1960
- Kreslíme rozprávku k medvídkovej chalúpke, 1960
- O veselé mašince, 1961
- Na polane, na lúke, 1961
- Kolo radovánek, 1961
- Dve mašinky, 1961
- Farby, farbičky, 1962
- 10 kuriatok, 1963
- Políčko, pole, 1963
- Nejkrásnější zvířátko, 1963
- Cose to děje? 1965
- Čarokruh, 1971
- Motýlí čas, 1978
