= Epidiapente =

Ancient Greek and medieval name for the interval of a fifth

In music of ancient Greece, the term epidiapente indicated an interval a perfect fifth higher. This meaning was also used by western European composers of the Renaissance, and can even be found as late as The Musical Offering of J. S. Bach. In that case, it was used in the "Fuga canonica in epidiapente" to indicate that the second (unwritten) voice was to enter a fifth higher. Friedrich Wilhelm Marpurg described in 1801 a canon to the upper fifth as canon in diapente.

The term 'hypodiapente' designated canons at the lower fifth.
