= Lukáš Hurník =

Czech composer (born 1967)

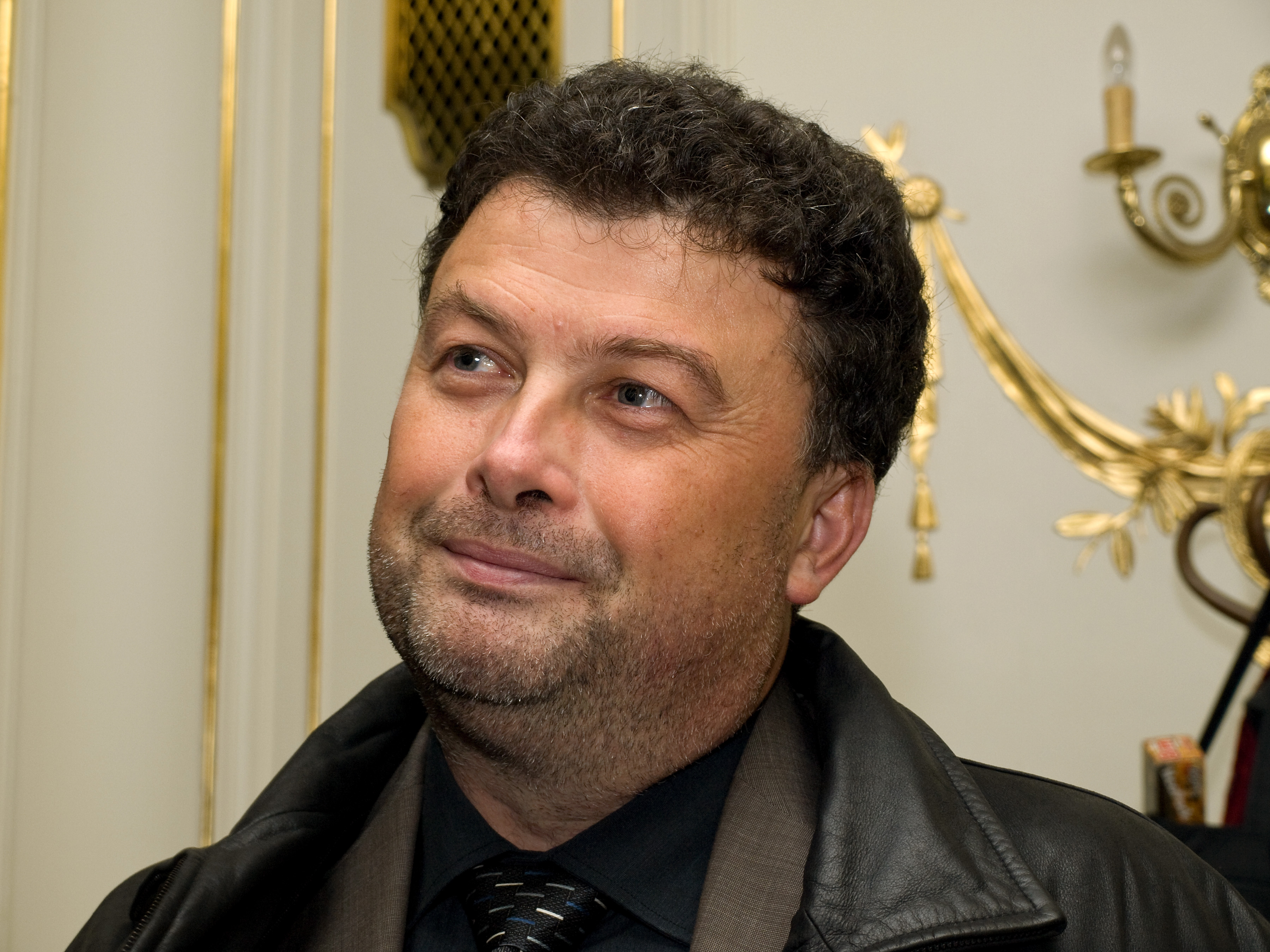
Lukáš Hurník (November 2010)

Lukáš Hurník (born 1967 in Prague) is a Czech composer. He graduated from Charles University with a degree in Music Studies. He learned to compose from his father, composer Ilja Hurník. He works as director manager of Czech Radio 3 – Vltava. In 1990 his composition entitled Hot-Suite for piano duo won first prize at the Piano Duo Association of Japan contest. His compositions have been awarded a number of honors at Czech and international competitions. A strong rhythm and melody and polyphonic voice parts are typical of Hurník's synthesis.

He has written a "Toccata and Prelude" for orchestra, which is designed to be played as an introduction to the Violin Concerto in E minor by Felix Mendelssohn, with the concerto commencing without a break.

== Selected works ==
Variations on Frank Zappa's theme for two saxophones and orchestra
Globus – symphony for percussion and orchestra
Girl and Machine – symphony
Trigon – concerto for violin, two string orchestras, 3 winds and percussion
The Angels – opera/musical for rock and opera singers, children's choir, symphony orchestra, rock band and electronic sounds in surround
Fusion Music for winds and piano (fl, cl, bassoon, pno)
Magnificat for mixed choir and basso continuo)
Křížová cesta oratorium (passion) for soloists, choir, speakers, children´s choir and orchestra
