= Karl Münchinger =

German conductor

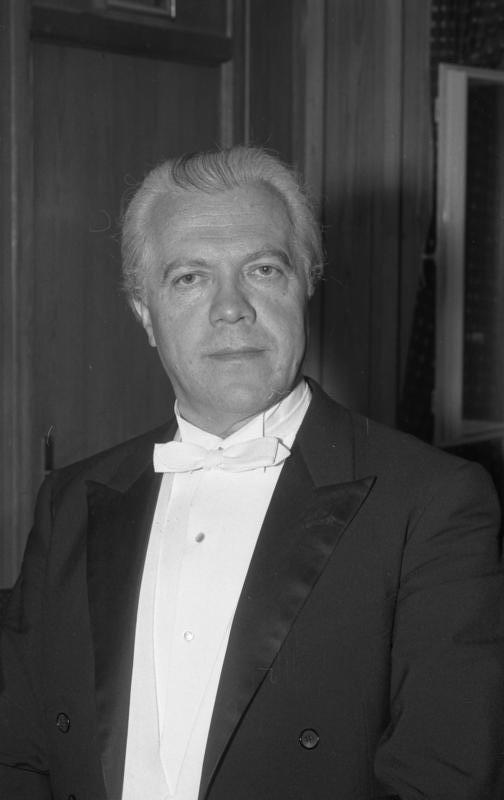
Karl Münchinger, 1968

Karl Münchinger (29 May 1915 – 13 March 1990) was a German conductor of European classical music. He helped to revive the now-ubiquitous Canon in D by Johann Pachelbel, through recording it with his Stuttgart Chamber Orchestra in 1960. (Jean-François Paillard made a rival, and also very popular, recording of the same piece at around the same time.) Münchinger is also noted for restoring baroque traditions to the interpretation of Bach's oeuvre, his greatest musical love — moderate-sized forces, judicious ornamentation, and rhythmic sprightliness, though not on "period instruments".

Born in Stuttgart, Münchinger studied at the Hochschule für Musik in his home city. At first, he guest-conducted often, supporting himself also with other duties as an organist and church choir director. In 1941, he became principal conductor of the Hanover Symphony, a post he held for the next two years. He held no other conducting position until the end of World War II.

The year that the war ended, he founded the Stuttgarter Kammerorchester (Stuttgart Chamber Orchestra), which he built into an impressive touring ensemble; it made its Paris debut in 1949 and its American debut in San Francisco in 1953. Under his leadership the orchestra issued (for the Decca label) numerous recordings, mostly during the 1950s and 1960s, and mostly of Bach's output; these included the Brandenburg Concertos (three times), the orchestral suites, the St. Matthew Passion, the St. John Passion, The Musical Offering, and the Christmas Oratorio. Of his and the ensemble's non-Bach releases, probably the best — and certainly the most famous, other than the Pachelbel performance mentioned earlier — is that of Haydn's The Creation.

In 1977, the Stuttgart Chamber Orchestra became the first German ensemble to visit the People's Republic of China. Münchinger retired in 1988, two years before his death.

Stylistically, Münchinger's approach with his orchestra was rather similar to those of his somewhat younger contemporaries Raymond Leppard, Sir Neville Marriner, Claudio Scimone, and the above-mentioned Paillard, though displaying an extra element of tonal solidity — not to mention a fierce rigor during rehearsals as well as performances — which might be considered Teutonic. With the increased fashionability of 18th-century instruments, from the 1970s onward, Münchinger's interpretations fell dramatically from critical favor and were often dismissed as "passé", though he always showed himself to be a fine, tough, disciplined, and sensitive musician. There have been more profoundly imaginative German conductors than Münchinger, but there have been very few who matched his consistently high standards.
