= Herálec (Žďár nad Sázavou District) =

- Municipality
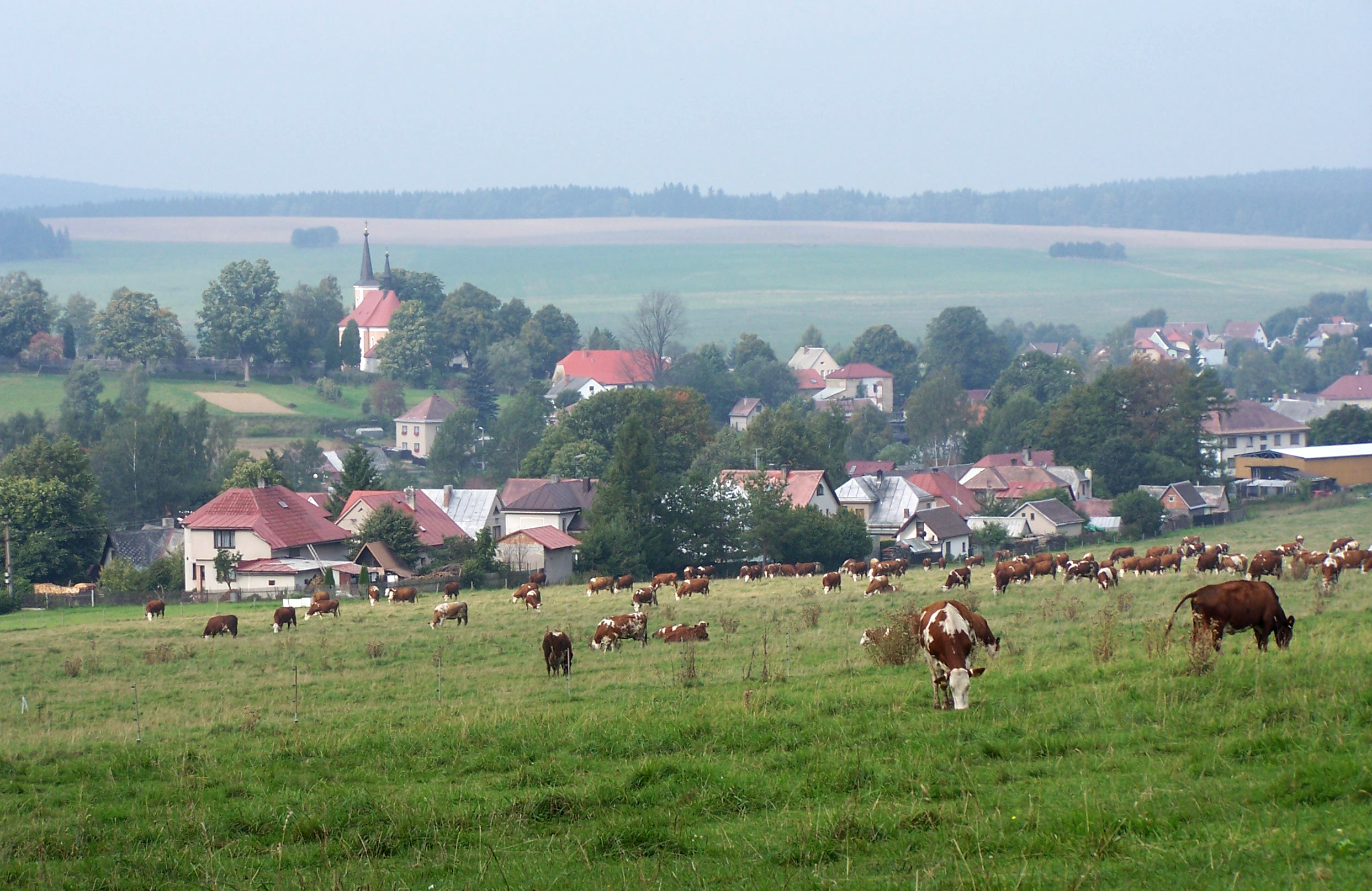
- View from the east

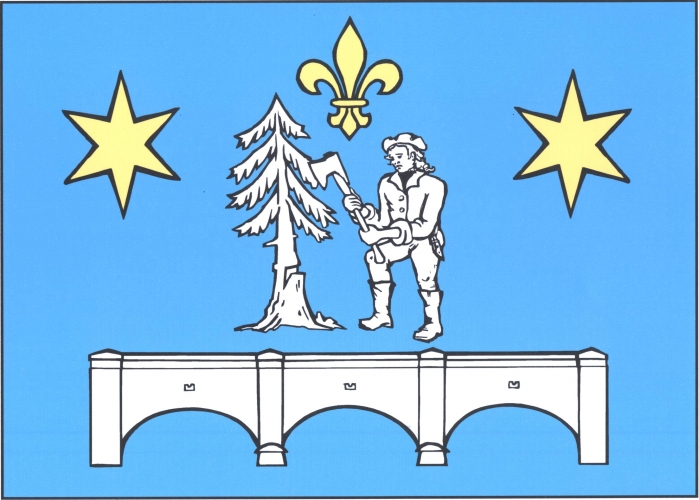
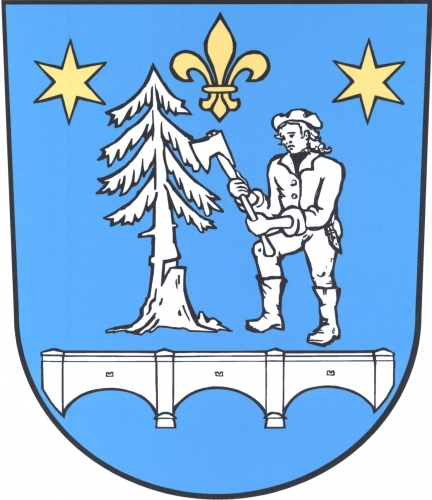
- Flag Coat of arms

- Location in the Czech Republic
- Coordinates: 49°41′20″N 15°59′40″E
- Country: Czech Republic
- Region: Vysočina
- District: Žďár nad Sázavou
- First mentioned: 1366

Area
  - Total: 23.87 km^{2} (9.22 sq mi)
- Elevation: 642 m (2,106 ft)

Population (2026-01-01)
  - Total: 1,344
  - Density: 56.30/km^{2} (145.8/sq mi)
- Time zone: UTC+1 (CET)
  - Summer (DST): UTC+2 (CEST)
- Postal code: 592 01
- Website: www.obecheralec.cz

Herálec is a municipality and village in Žďár nad Sázavou District in the Vysočina Region of the Czech Republic. It has about 1,300 inhabitants.

== Administrative division ==
Herálec consists of five municipal parts (in brackets population according to the 2021 census):

- Herálec (348)
- Brušovec (11)
- Český Herálec (877)
- Kocanda (60)
- Kuchyně (0)

== Geography ==
Herálec is located about 14 kilometres (9 mi) north of Žďár nad Sázavou and 43 km (27 mi) northeast of Jihlava. It lies on the border between the Upper Svratka Highlands and Iron Mountains. The highest point is at 803 m (2,635 ft) above sea level. The Svratka River flows through the municipality; it formed here the historical border between Bohemia and Moravia. The whole municipality lies within the Žďárské vrchy Protected Landscape Area.

== History ==
The first written mention of Moravský Herálec is from 1366. In a court case from that year, the territory with the village fell to the Nové Město na Moravě estate, while the territory beyond the river, on which Český Herálec was later founded, fell to the monastery in Žďár nad Sázavou. The village of Český Herálec was first documented in 1456. In 1496, the area was bought by Vilém II of Pernštejn.

== Demographics ==
Historical population

Year	Pop.	±%
1869	1,763	—
1880	1,819	+3.2%
1890	1,824	+0.3%
1900	1,814	−0.5%
1910	1,905	+5.0%

Year	Pop.	±%
1921	1,760	−7.6%
1930	2,448	+39.1%
1950	1,334	−45.5%
1961	1,335	+0.1%
1970	1,319	−1.2%

Year	Pop.	±%
1980	1,254	−4.9%
1991	1,257	+0.2%
2001	1,259	+0.2%
2011	1,279	+1.6%
2021	1,296	+1.3%

Source: Censuses

== Transport ==
There are no railways or major roads passing through the municipality.

== Sights ==
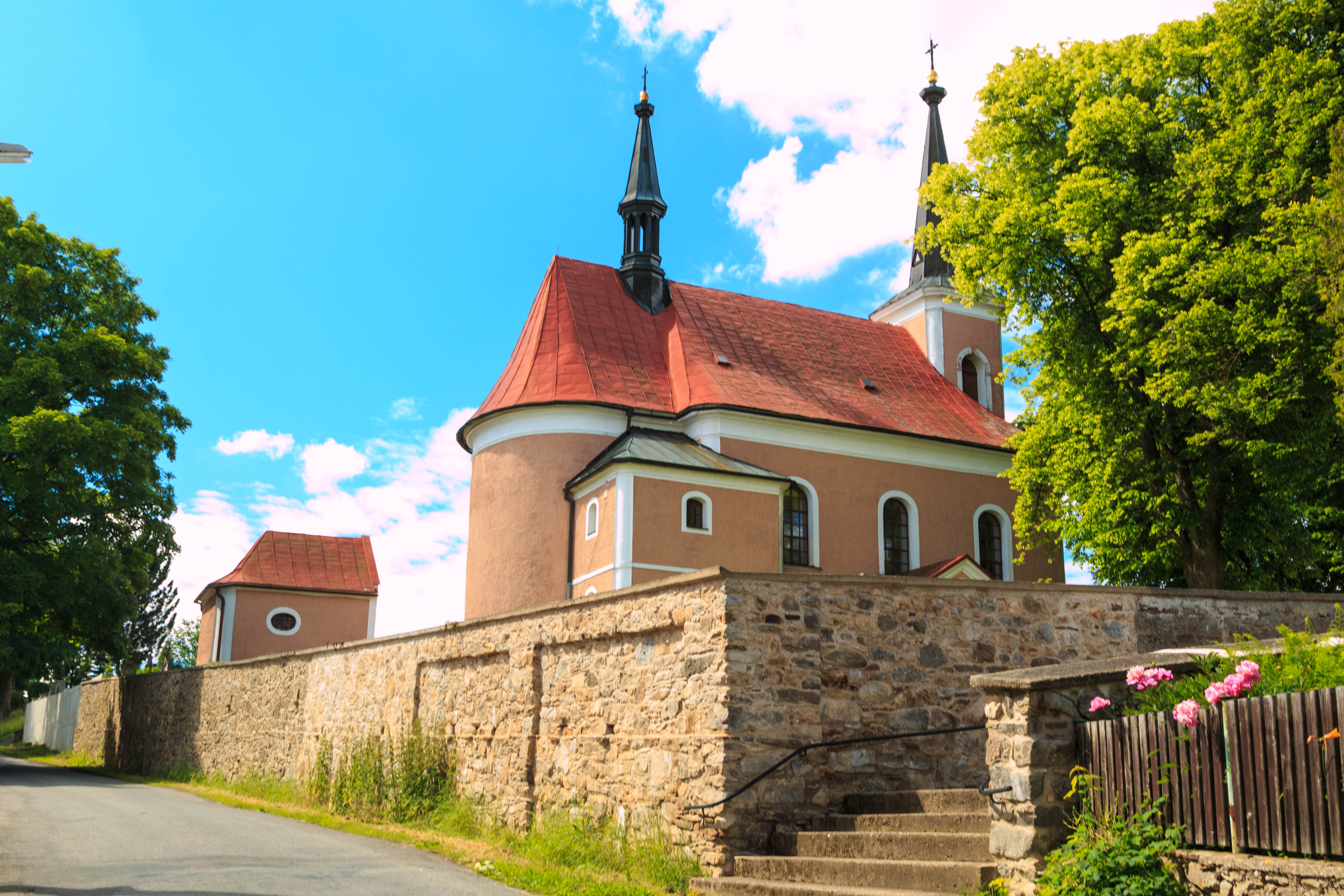
Church of Saint Catherine

The most valuable monument is the Church of Saint Catherine. It was built in the late Baroque style in 1784–1790.

A technical monument is the stone bridge. It was built in 1856, when it replaced an old wooden bridge from the 18th century.

== Notable people ==
- František Sláma (1923–2004), cellist
