= Heřmaň (Písek District) =

- Municipality
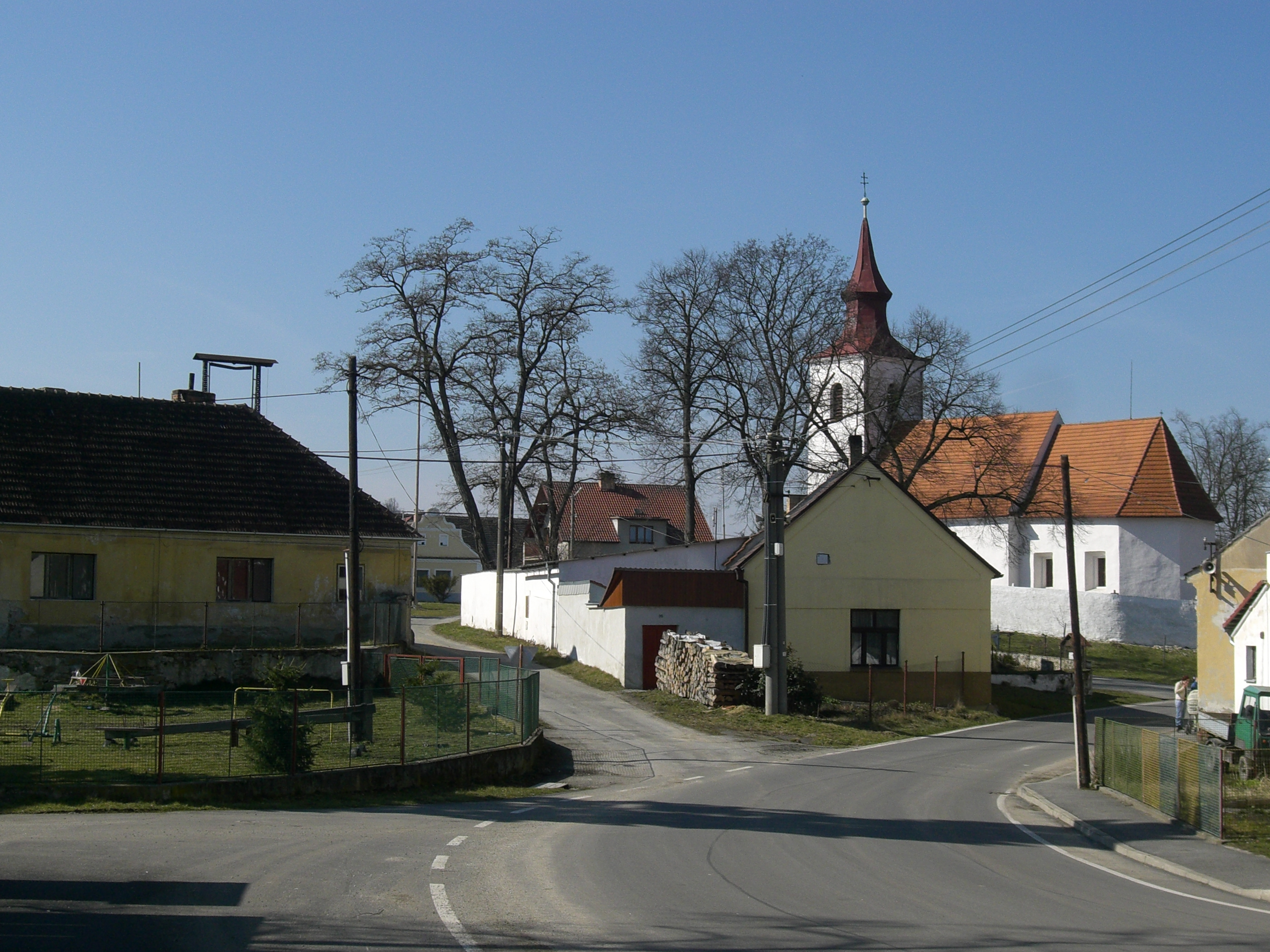
- Centre of Heřmaň

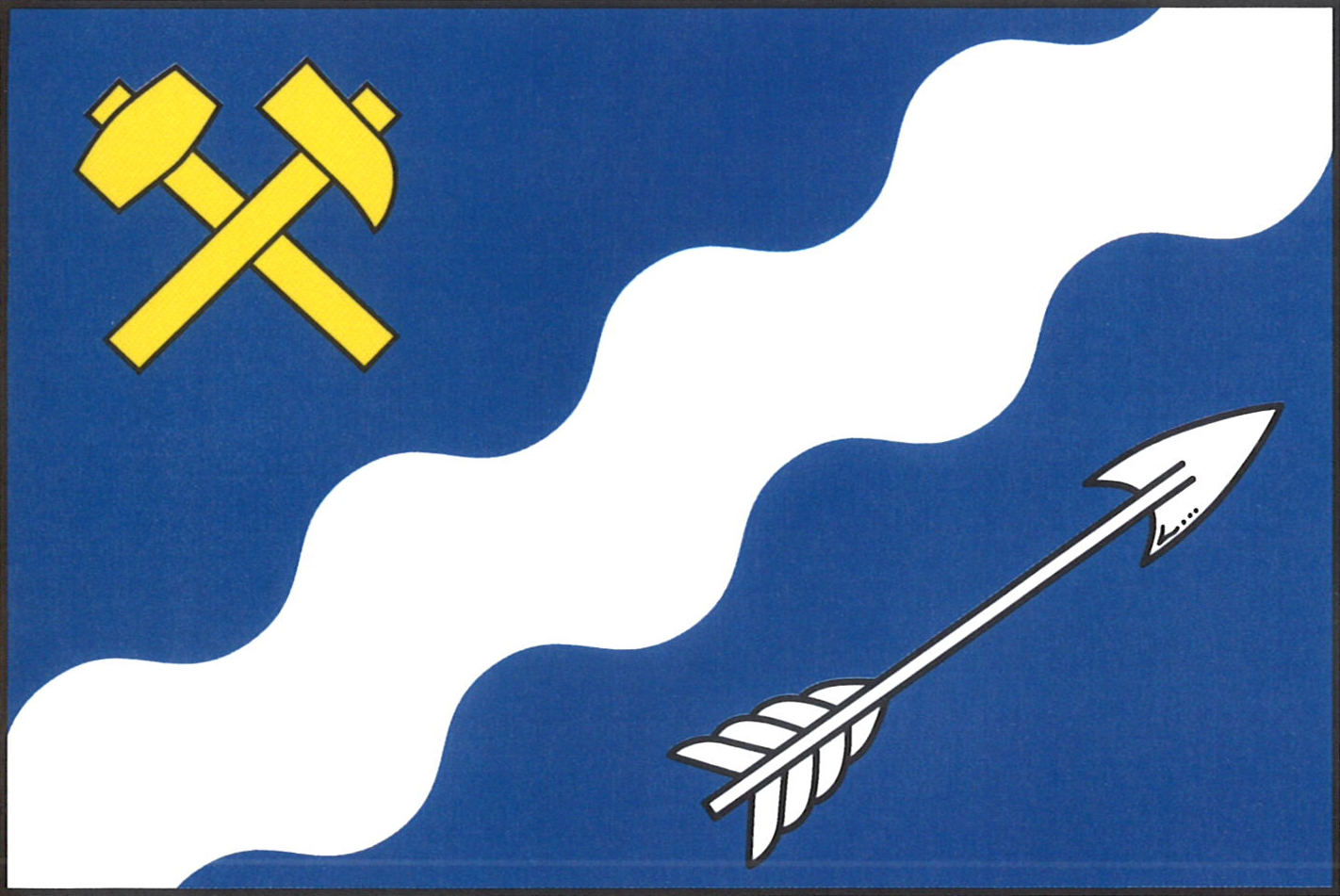
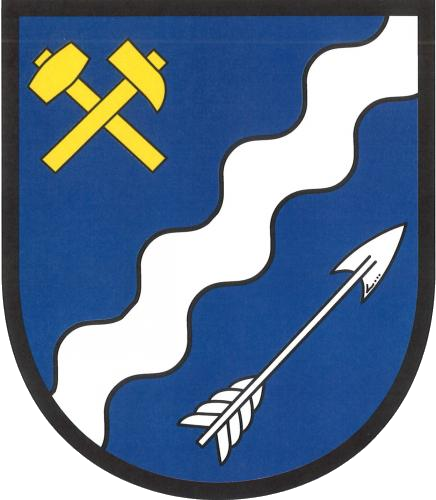
- Flag Coat of arms

- Location in the Czech Republic
- Coordinates: 49°13′57″N 14°8′8″E
- Country: Czech Republic
- Region: South Bohemian
- District: Písek
- First mentioned: 1227

Area
  - Total: 7.06 km^{2} (2.73 sq mi)
- Elevation: 382 m (1,253 ft)

Population (2026-01-01)
  - Total: 322
  - Density: 45.6/km^{2} (118/sq mi)
- Time zone: UTC+1 (CET)
  - Summer (DST): UTC+2 (CEST)
- Postal code: 398 11
- Website: www.obecherman.cz

Heřmaň is a municipality and village in Písek District in the South Bohemian Region of the Czech Republic. It has about 300 inhabitants.

Heřmaň lies approximately 8 kilometres (5 mi) south of Písek, 38 km (24 mi) north-west of České Budějovice, and 98 km (61 mi) south of Prague.

== Demographics ==
Historical population
Year	Pop.	±%
1869	545	—
1880	556	+2.0%
1890	542	−2.5%
1900	546	+0.7%
1910	554	+1.5%
1921	571	+3.1%
1930	532	−6.8%
1950	415	−22.0%
1961	404	−2.7%
1970	357	−11.6%
1980	295	−17.4%
1991	224	−24.1%
2001	216	−3.6%
2011	241	+11.6%
2021	274	+13.7%
Source: Censuses
