= Ladislav Mráz =

Czech singer

Ladislav Mráz (25 September 1923 – 7 May 1962) was a Czech operatic bass-baritone who had an active career in Czechoslovakia from 1943 through 1962. His voice is preserved on a number of recordings made on the Supraphon label, including complete recordings of Bedřich Smetana's The Devil's Wall and Antonín Dvořák's The Specter's Bride.

== Biography ==
Mráz studied singing at the Prague Conservatory with Hilbert Vávra and Mrs. E. Fierlingerová. He made his professional opera debut at the opera house in Tábor in 1943 where he was committed for the 1943-1944 season. From 1944-1946 he sang at the Divadlo Josefa Kajetána Tyla in Plzeň. He was committed to the Prague State Opera from 1946-1948.

In 1948 Mráz became a member of the Prague National Theatre. He returned to the State Opera in 1950 but then returned to the National Theatre in 1953 where he remained until his death nine years later. Among the roles he created on stage were Count Vilém of Harasov in The Jacobin, Creon in Oedipus rex, Hans Sachs in Die Meistersinger von Nürnberg, Herrmann in Tannhäuser, Kecal in The Bartered Bride, Leporello in Don Giovanni, Rarach in The Devil's Wall, Vodník in Rusalka, and the title roles in The Flying Dutchman, and Svätopluk.

From 1948 to 1961 Mráz regularly appeared at the Prague Spring Festival. In 1956 he won first prize at the Dutch International Vocal Competition 's-Hertogenbosch. He appeared frequently in concerts and recitals in the Netherlands, performing as a soloist in such works as Johann Sebastian Bach's St Matthew Passion and Johannes Passion, and Ludwig van Beethoven's Symphony No. 9. He also made a number of appearances on Dutch radio and television, notably recording the main protagonist in Giuseppe Verdi's Falstaff.

Mráz also performed frequently with the Czech Philharmonic Orchestra as a soloist in oratorios, song cycles, and works of contemporary music. Guest appearances took him to opera houses in Paris, Vienna, and Holland. He sang Hans Sachs at the opening of the new opera house in Leipzig in 1960 where he was a guest artist for many years. He was awarded the USSR State Prize in 1961. He died at the height of his stage career in Prague in 1962 at the age of 38.
