= Ilja Hurník =

Czech composer and essayist (1922–2013)

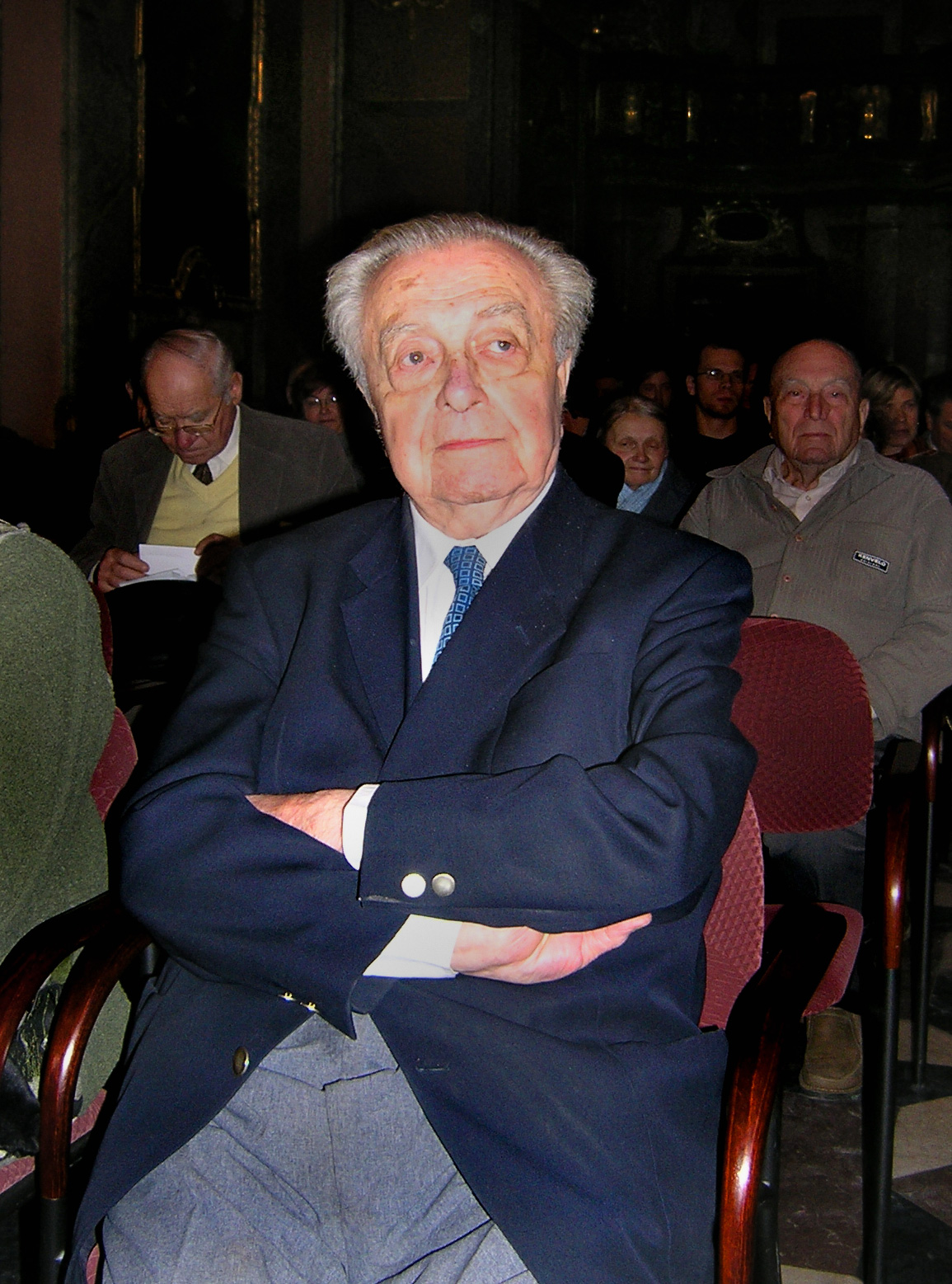
- Hurník in 2009
- Born: 25 November 1922; Poruba, Czechoslovakia
- Died: 7 September 2013 (aged 90); Prague, Czech Republic
- Occupations: Composer, essayist

Ilja Hurník (25 November 1922 – 7 September 2013) was a Czech composer and essayist.

== Biography ==
Hurnik was born in Poruba, now part of Ostrava. He entered the Prague Conservatory, then went on to the Prague Academy of Arts, where he studied with Ilona Štěpánová-Kurzová, daughter of Vilém Kurz.

His 1952 Sonata da camera, for flute, oboe, cello and harpsichord, has been recorded on Cedille Records.

A 2008 Supraphon CD (SU 3944–2) contains two of Hurník's instrumental compositions: the colorful ballet music Ondráš, written in 1951, and his Four Seasons Chamber Suite, written in 1952. Both are performed by the Czech Philharmonic Orchestra led by Karel Ančerl.

He is father of Lukáš Hurník, brother-in-law of Petr Eben and uncle of Marek Eben. Ilja Hurník died in Prague on 7 September 2013 at the age of 90.

== Selected works ==
Stage

- Ondráš, Ballet, Silesian Folk Ballad (1949)
- Dáma a lupiči (The Lady and the Robbers; Die Dame und die Räuber), Comic Opera in 4 acts (1966); libretto by the composer loosely based on the film The Ladykillers
- Mudrci a bloudi (Wisemen and Fools), Opera in 3 Scenes on Themes of Antiquity, the Middle Ages and Modern Times (1986); libretto by the composer
- Diogenes, Apocrypha (1973); libretto by the composer
- Faux pas de quatre, Ballet-grotesque (1978)
- Rybáři v síti (Fishermen in Their Own Nets), Comic Opera (1981); libretto by the composer based on original short stories
- Oldřich a Boženka (Oldřich and Boženka), Opera (1984); libretto by the composer

Orchestral

- Tance z baletu Ondráš (Dances from the Ballet "Ondráš"), Suite (1949, 1951)
- Komorní hudba (Chamber Music) for string orchestra (1962)
- Kyklopes (1965)
- Serenade for string orchestra (1970)
- Věci, Divertimento for small orchestra (1977)
- Klicperovská předehra (Overture à la Klicpera) (1978)
- Suita z baletu Faux pas de quatre (Suite from the Ballet "Faux pas de quatre") (1978)
- Symfonieta (1996)
- Con brio (published 2000)
- Symphony in C (2000)
- Leporelo for small orchestra (2007)
- Faun a Apollo (The Faun and Apollo) (2006, 2008); orchestration of the Sextet for brass and organ

Concertante

- Partita for flute, string orchestra and piano (1950)
- Concerto for flute and chamber orchestra (1952)
- Concerto for oboe, string orchestra and harpsichord (or piano) (1954)
- Concerto for wind instruments, piano and timpani (1956)
- Sinfonia facile for piano and string orchestra (1963)
- Concerto for piano and chamber orchestra (1972)
- Nový clavecin (New Harpsichord) for piano and string orchestra (1975); original for piano solo
- Concertino for piano and string orchestra (1978)
- Concertino for 2 violins and string orchestra (1981)
- Concert for viola and string orchestra (1994)

Chamber music

- Caprices for solo violin, Op. 4 (published 1949)
- Partita in A for flute and harpsichord (or piano) (1950); also orchestrated; dedicated to Czech flautist Václav Žilka
- Sonata for viola and piano, Op. 26 (1951)
- Čtvero ročních dob (The Four Seasons), Suite for wind quintet or 12 instruments (1952)
- Sonata da camera for flute, oboe, cello and harpsichord or piano (1952)
- Esercizi for flute, oboe, clarinet and bassoon (1956)
- Malý faun (Little Faun; Le petit faune), 5 Pièces en forme de suite for flute and piano (1956)
- Moments musicaux, Suite for 11 wind instruments (1962)
- Concerto for oboe and piano (1964)
- Vánočńí koledy (Christmas Carols) for violin and piano (1968)
- Gloria di flauti for 2 flutes (1972)
- Concertino for violin and piano (1973)
- Concertino for 2 violins and piano (or harpsichord) (1981); also orchestrated
- Obrázky (Little Pictures), Very Easy Pieces for flute (or recorder, or oboe) and piano (1984)
- Sonatina for double bass (or bassoon) and piano (1985)
- Wind Quintet No. 2 (1985)
- Tance (Dances) for harp (1986)
- Sonatina for oboe and piano (1988)
- Suite for alto saxophone and piano (1990)
- Trio in C for oboe, clarinet and bassoon (1993)
- Tance pro andílky (Dances for Little Angels) for violin, flute and piano (1995)
- Sonatina for violin and harp (1996)
- Concerto capriccio for organ, 2 violin and cello (1998)
- Variace na Beethovenovo téma (Variations on a Theme of Beethoven) for viola and piano (1998)
- Sonatina for violin and piano (2001)
- V tom našem sádečku a jiné lidové písničky ("V tom našem sádečku" and Other Folk Songs) for recorder (violin, flute, oboe, clarinet) and piano (2002)
- Sextet for brass and organ (2006); also orchestrated
- Etudy pro dechový (Etudes for Winds), Octet for 2 oboes, 2 clarinets, 2 horns and 2 bassoons (2010)

Piano

- První melodie: Snadné přednesové skladbičky pro mládež (First Melodies: Easy Little Pieces for Young Students) (1932)
- Motivy z dětství (Motifs from Childhood) (1934, revised 1944)
- Groteska (1938)
- Dvě toccaty (2 Toccatas), Op. 2 (published 1943)
- Preludia (Preludes), Op. 9 (1942)
- Sonatina C dur (Sonatina in C major) (1950)
- Tance: Domácí hudba (Dances: Home Music) for piano 4-hands (1963)
- Kousky pro klavír ve snadném slohu (Piano Pieces in an Easy Style)
- Písničky pro klapky: Snadné skladby (Ditties for Keys), Easy Pieces (1969)
- Valčiky (Waltzes) for piano 4-hands (1971)
- Čtyřruční hra: Cvičení a etudy (Four-handed Fun: Exercises and Etudes) for piano 4-hands (1972)
- Nový clavecin (Le nouveau clavecin), Suite for Piano (1975); also for piano and string orchestra
- Voršilská ulička (Ursuline Street), Cycle of Easy Recital Compositions (Book I) (1976)
- Džezík (Jazz Piccolo), Easy Pieces (1977)
- Fantazie (Fantasy) for 2 pianos (1979)
- Variace na Pergolesiho téma (Variations on a Theme of Pergolesi) for piano 4-hands (1983)
- Etudy (Etudes) (1987)
- Innocenza for piano 4-hands (1992)
- Voršilská ulička 2. sešit (Ursuline Street, Book II), Cycle of Easy Recital Compositions (1999)
- Šest rukou u jednoho klavíru (Six Hands at One Piano), Suite in 4 Movements for piano 6-hands (published 2005)
- Hudba pro klavír (Music for Piano) (2005)
- 12 klavírních preludií (12 Preludes) (2008)

Vocal

- Květiny (Flowers), Song Cycle for soprano and piano, Op. 3 (1940); words by František Vrba
- Dívčí písně (Girl's Songs) for medium voice and piano, Op. 7 (1942)
- Písničky s flétnou (Little Songs with Flute), for high voice, flute (or violin) and piano (1950); folk poetry texts
- Šalamoun (Solomon) for bass (baritone) and string quartet or organ (1961); words from the Song of Songs
- Minutové písničky (Minute Songs) for soprano, flute and piano (1961); words by Václav Fischer and Jan Hostáň
- Muzikanti (The Musicians), Suite for narrator and 18 instrumental soloists (1963); poems by František Branislav
- Šalamít (Shulamith), Song Cycle for medium voice and piano, or organ, or chamber ensemble (1963); words translated by Jaroslav Seifert from the Song of Songs
- Příběhy jedné kapely (Stories of a Band) for narrator and chamber ensemble (1968); words by the composer
- Verba sancta for soprano and harpsichord or chamber orchestra (2006)

Choral

- Maryka, Cantata on Silesian Folk Lyrics for soprano, mixed chorus and orchestra (1948); texts adapted from Silesian folk nursery rhymes
- Sbory o matkách (Choruses About Mothers), 3 Mixed Choruses to Folk Poetry Texts (1955)
- Vyhřátá mez (On the Sunny Balk; Am sonnigen Rain), Cycle for children's (girl's) chorus and piano (1955); words by Jan Čarek
- Noé (Noah), Oratorio for tenor, mixed chorus and orchestra (1959); Biblical text
- Dětská terzetta (Children's Trios) for 3 children's voices, flute, harp and double bass (1962); words by František Branislav
- Červnová noc (June Night; Juninacht), Cycle of Duets for children's (girl's) chorus and piano (1965); folk poetry texts
- Vánočńí Pastorela (Christmas Pastorella; Weihnachtspastorella) for children's chorus and chamber ensemble (1965)
- Tři dcery (Three Daughters; Drei Töchter), Small Cantata for children's (girl's) chorus (1960); folk poetry texts
- Ezop (Aesop), Suita di cantate for mixed chorus and orchestra (1964); words by Pavel Jurkoviď after Aesop's Fables
- Scény pro dětský sbor (Scenes) for children's chorus (1971); words by Václav Fischer and the composer
- Ozvěna (Echo), Chamber Cantata for soloists, female chorus, chamber string orchestras, oboe and piano (1982); words by the composer
- Sezónní madrigaly (Seasonal Madrigals) for mixed chamber chorus and instrumental ensemble (1982); words by the composer
- Rozhovory matky s děckem (Conversations between Mother and Child), Children's Choruses (1984); folk texts and by the composer
- Kapr, blecha a tak dále (The Carp, the Flea and Others), Ditties for children's chorus and piano (1985); words by the composer
- Voda voděnka (Water, Little Water) for children's chorus (1985); words by Václav Fischer
- Missa Vinea Crucis for children's (or female) chorus and orchestra (or organ) (1991)
- Letnice (Pentecost) for children's chorus (2002); folk poetry and Biblical texts
