= Poruba (Ostrava) =

- City district of Ostrava
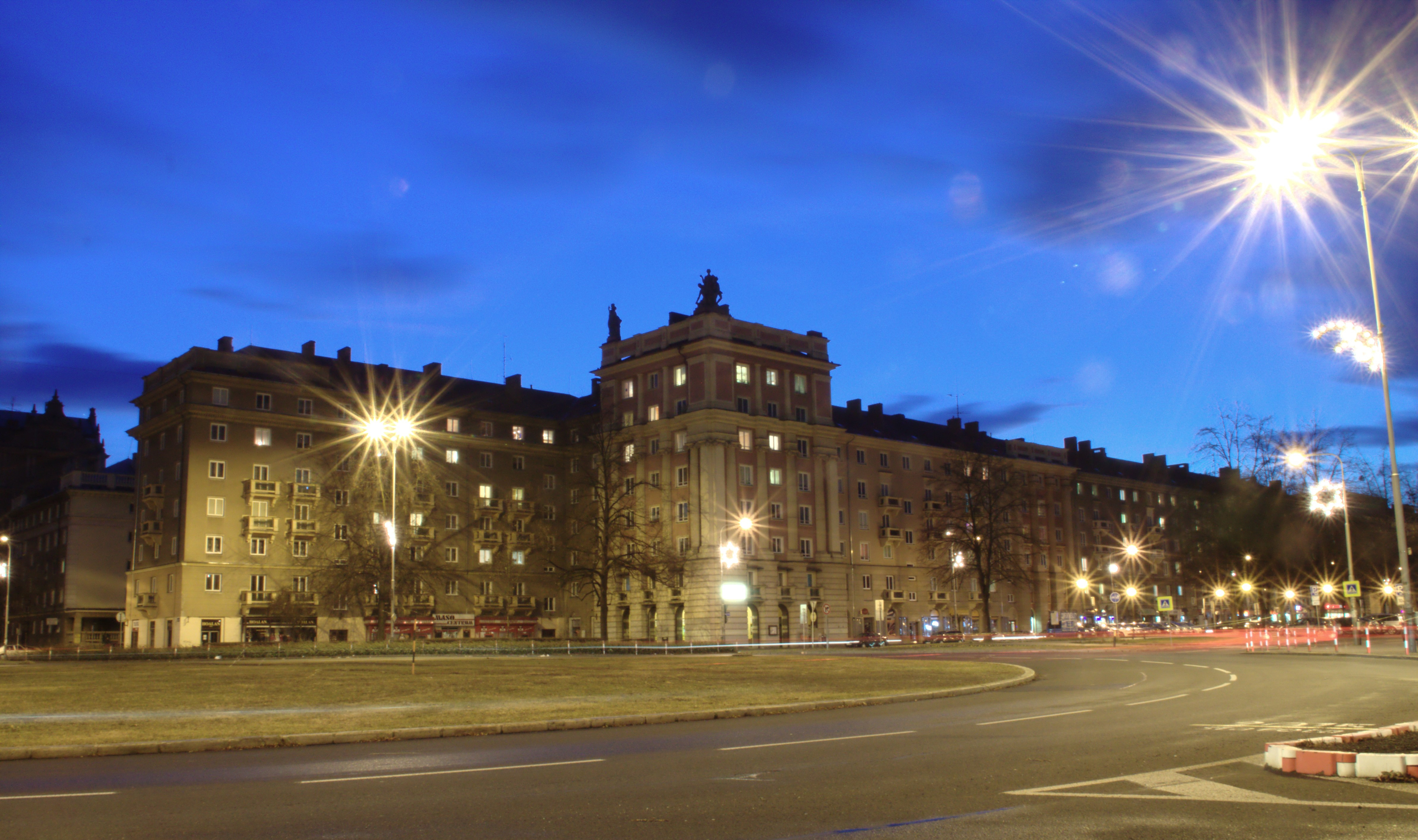
- Poruba in the evening

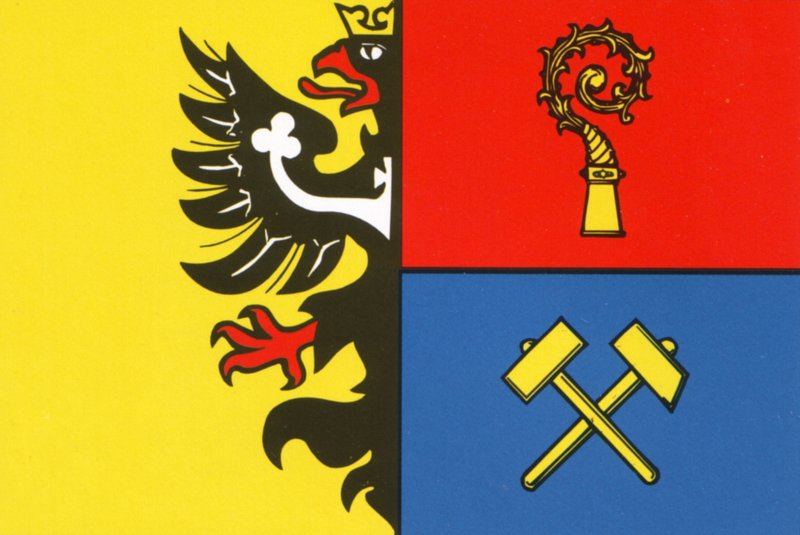
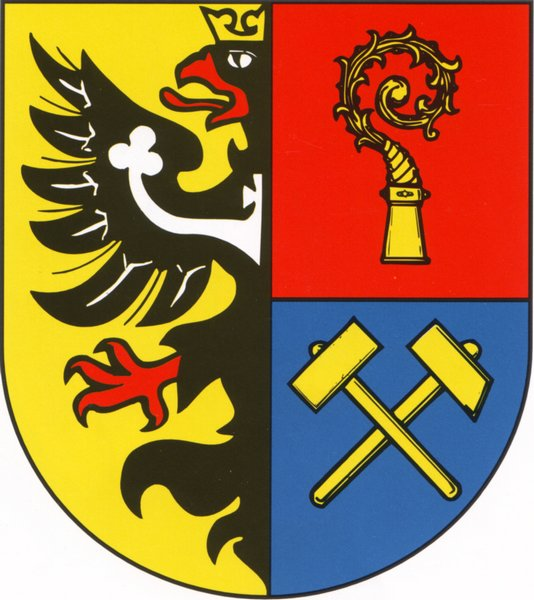
- Flag Coat of arms

- Location of Poruba in Ostrava
- Coordinates: 49°49′44″N 18°10′01″E
- Country: Czech Republic
- Region: Moravian-Silesian Region
- City: Ostrava

Government
  - Mayor: Lucie Baránková (ANO)

Area
  - Total: 13.18 km^{2} (5.09 sq mi)

Population (2021)
  - Total: 61,939
  - Density: 4,699/km^{2} (12,170/sq mi)
- Time zone: UTC+1 (CET)
  - Summer (DST): UTC+2 (CEST)
- Postal code: 708 00
- Website: https://poruba.ostrava.cz/cs

Poruba is a city district of Ostrava, a city in the Moravian-Silesian Region in the Czech Republic. It lies in the Silesian part of the city.

It lies in the historical region of Silesia and was first mentioned in a written document in 1377.

Heavy industrialization of Ostrava in the second half of the 19th century didn't have major impact on Poruba which retained its agricultural character. Several factories were built here at the beginning of the 20th century.

According to the Austrian census of 1910 the village had 1,403 inhabitants, 1,401 of whom had permanent residence there. Census asked people for their native language, 1,381 (98.6%) were Czech-speaking. Most populous religious group were Roman Catholics with 1,392 (99.2%).

Major event in the history of Poruba was a decision of communist authorities to build here a large complex of apartment buildings which were supposed to house workers who came to Ostrava from various parts of the country in large numbers after World War II. The construction began in the early 1950s. At its peak almost 100,000 people lived in Poruba, today about 61,000 people live there. It is one of the most populous districts of the city and is known for its shopping district.

Poruba was formerly an independent municipality. It became a part of Ostrava in 1957.

Most important cultural landmarks of Poruba are Saint Nicholas Church and Poruba Castle.

== Demographics ==
Historical population

Year	Pop.	±%
1869	674	—
1880	840	+24.6%
1890	911	+8.5%
1900	1,127	+23.7%
1910	1,403	+24.5%

Year	Pop.	±%
1921	1,554	+10.8%
1930	1,880	+21.0%
1950	1,596	−15.1%
1961	42,575	+2567.6%
1970	83,196	+95.4%

Year	Pop.	±%
1980	93,667	+12.6%
1991	83,982	−10.3%
2001	74,980	−10.7%
2011	66,603	−11.2%
2021	61,939	−7.0%

Source: Censuses
