= Matthias Maierhofer =

Austrian organist and church musician (born 1979)

- Born: 8 December 1979 (age 45); Graz, Austria
- Occupation(s): professor for organ music, cathedral organist at Freiburg Minster
- Years active: 2005–present

Matthias Maierhofer (born 8 December 1979 in Graz, Austria) is an Austrian organist and church musician.

== Education ==
Matthias Maierhofer received his primary music education from Karl Schmelzer-Ziringer. Later on, he studied organ and church music at the universities of Graz (Austria), Leipzig (Germany), Freiburg (Germany) and at the Schola Cantorum in Basel (Switzerland). His teachers include Arvid Gast, Andrea Marcon, Kurt Neuhauser and Martin Schmeding. He completed his studies with a soloist's diploma and graduated with honors from the University of Music, Freiburg.

== Awards and Concerts ==
In 2007, Matthias Maierhofer won the international organ competition Pachelbel-Wettbewerb in Nuremberg, Germany. He received awards at the international Franz Schmidt-Orgelwettbewerb in Kitzbühel, Austria, in 2008, the international Bachwettbewerb in Arnstadt, Germany, in 2007, the international Orgelconcours in Nijmegen, Netherlands, in 2006, and the international organ competition M. K. Ciurlionis in Vilnius, Lithuania, in 2003.

His successful concert career has taken him to important music festivals such as the Brucknertage at the St. Florian Monastery in Linz, Austria, the Internationale Orgelwoche Nürnberg in Nuremberg, Germany, the Mendelssohnfesttage in Leipzig, Germany, the Lithuanian Orgelfest, the Bachwoche in Ansbach, Germany, the Birmingham Symphony Hall in Great Britain, the Izumi Hall in Izumi, Osaka, Japan, the Musikfest in Stuttgart, Germany, and the Domkonzerte in Riga, Latvia.

As a soloist as well as an accompanying continuo organist, Matthias Maierhofer has appeared on stage with various ensembles including the Dresdner Kreuzchor, the University Choir Leipzig, the Kantorei Graz and the Staatskapelle Dresden. He has performed for CD productions and publications of Edition Helbling, and recordings of his concerts can be found in several broadcasting corporations and under the label Ambitus.

== Career ==
Between 2005 and 2009 Matthias Maierhofer worked as church musician for the Roman Catholic parish St Albertus Magnus at Freiburg, Germany. During this period he also taught at the Academy for Outstanding Students (Akademie zur Begabtenförderung) as an assistant lecturer of Martin Schmeding at the University of Music, Freiburg. In September 2009 he was appointed to a full-time position as artistic colleague at the University of Music and Theatre "Felix Mendelssohn Bartholdy" at Leipzig, Germany. There, he taught artistic and liturgical organ and improvisation. In 2013, Matthias Maierhofer was appointed as successor of Prof. Dr. Gerre Hancock to the chair of organ and church music at the University of Texas at Austin. He was appointed Dean's Fellow in 2015 for outstanding pedagogical achievements and received the Ducloux Fellowship of the College of Fine Arts.

In 2016 he moved back to Freiburg, Germany, where he accepted the chair of organ music at the University of Music, Freiburg. He was also appointed cathedral organist at the Freiburg Minster.
