= Václav Talich =

Czech conductor, violinist and musical pedagogue (1883–1961)

Václav Talich

Václav Talich (Czech pronunciation: [ˈvaːtslaf ˈtalɪx]; 28 May 1883, Kroměříž – 16 March 1961, Beroun) was a Czech conductor, violinist and later a musical pedagogue. He is remembered today as one of the greatest conductors of the 20th century, the object of countless reissues of his many recordings.

== Life ==
Born in Kroměříž, Moravia, he started his musical career in a student orchestra in Klatovy. From 1897 to 1903 he studied violin with Otakar Ševčík at the Prague Conservatory, and later became the concertmaster of the Berlin Philharmonic for the 1903–04 season; he was so fascinated by the chief conductor Arthur Nikisch that he decided to become a conductor, studying conducting with Nikisch in Leipzig. He first conducted in Tbilisi in 1906, and his first conducting post was in Ljubljana with the Slovenian Philharmonic. He then went to Plzeň, where he conducted opera from 1912 to 1915. From 1915 to 1918 he was the violist of the Bohemian Quartet (later called Czech Quartet).

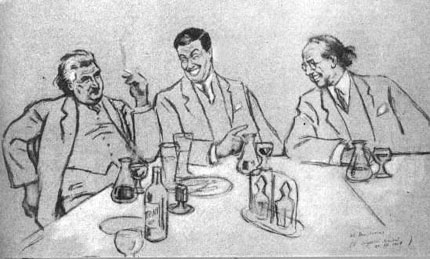
The caricature of Josef Suk, Václav Talich and Vítězslav Novák by Hugo Boettinger

Talich's career with the Czech Philharmonic began on 30 October 1918 when he conducted the premiere of the symphonic poem Zrání (Ripening) by Josef Suk. From 1919 to 1941 he was the orchestra's chief conductor, raising its prestige to world levels, touring widely with it, and recording Czech music for EMI. Concurrently he was chief conductor of the Scottish National Orchestra in the 1926–27 season, and of the Konsertföreningen Orchestra in Stockholm from 1926 to 1936. In 1935 he was appointed chief opera administrator at the National Theatre in Prague, where he promoted works by Leoš Janáček, some of whose works he premiered. In 1944, he was dismissed from that post and the National Theatre was closed by the Nazi regime.

After the war, Talich was arrested by communists and accused of collaboration with the Germans. The accusations were refuted and he resumed his career in 1946, establishing the Czech Chamber Orchestra, with students of the Prague Conservatory. When in 1948 the orchestra was ordered by the regime to choose a different conductor or disband, it chose to disband. Talich then founded the Slovak Philharmonic in Bratislava, conducting it until 1952. He was also allowed to resume his association with the Czech Philharmonic, giving his last public performance with it in November 1954, though he made recordings and broadcasts with it until 1956. In 1957 he became a national artist, the highest distinction in Czechoslovakia.

Particularly noted for his interpretations of Czech composers such as Antonín Dvořák, Bedřich Smetana and Josef Suk, Talich also did much to bring the operas of Leoš Janáček into the standard repertoire. Talich also taught a good deal, with Karel Ančerl, Jaroslav Krombholc, Charles Mackerras, Ladislav Slovák, Ivan Romanoff, and Milan Munclinger among his pupils.

From 1936 Talich lived intermittently in Beroun, where he also died in 1961 at the age of 77. An elementary art school in the town was named in his honor, and the Talich's Beroun music festival, which has been held annually since 1983, is also named after him.

== Sources ==
- Barber, Charles (2001). "Talich, Václav". New Grove Dictionary of Music and Musicians, vol. 25. London: Macmillan Publishers Ltd. ISBN 0-333-60800-3.
- Sláma, František (2001). Z Herálce do Šangrilá a zase nazpátek (in Czech). Říčany: Orego. ISBN 80-86117-61-8.
- Kuna, Milan (1980). Václav Talich (in Czech). Prague.
- Československý hudební slovník osob a institucí, II (Czechoslovak Music Dictionary) (in Czech). Prague: SHV. 1965.
- Holzknecht, Václav (1963). Česká filharmonie, příběh orchestru (Czech Philharmonic. History of the Orchestra) (in Czech). Prague: SHV.
