= Stuttgarter Kammerorchester =

German chamber orchestra

Stuttgart Chamber Orchestra
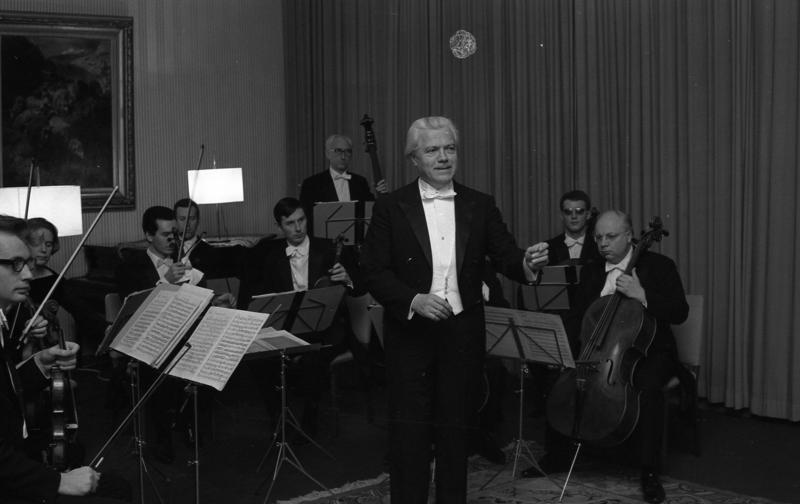
- Fronted by Karl Münchinger
- Founded: 1945
- Location: Stuttgart
- Concert hall: Liederhalle, Stuttgart
- Principal conductor: Thomas Zehetmair
- Website: stuttgarter-kammerorchester.com/index-en

The Stuttgart Chamber Orchestra (Stuttgarter Kammerorchester) is a German chamber orchestra based in Stuttgart. Its principal concert venue is the Liederhalle, Stuttgart.

== History ==
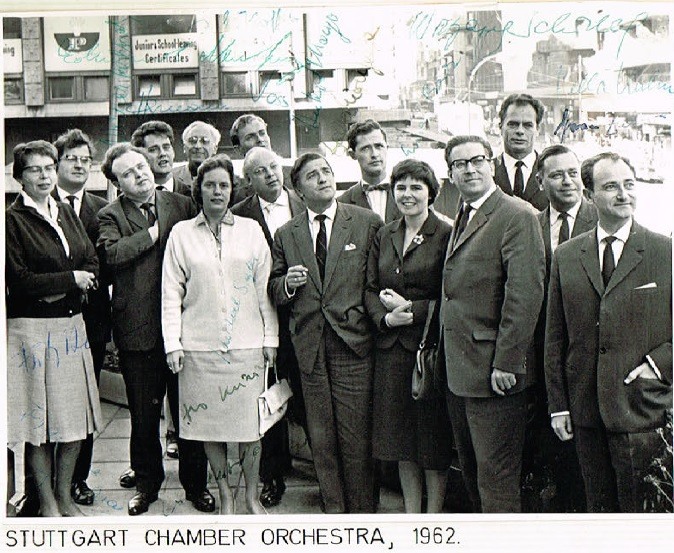
On a 1962 tour of Southern Africa

Karl Münchinger founded the orchestra in 1945, and served as its chief conductor until 1987. With Münchinger, the orchestra made its USA debut in March 1954 in New York City. Martin Sieghart was the orchestras second chief conductor from 1990 to 1995. From 1995 to 2006, Dennis Russell Davies was chief conductor, and his projects with the orchestra included recordings of Haydn symphonies.

Subsequent chief conductors have included Michael Hofstetter (2006–2013) and Matthias Foremny (2013–2019). In October 2017, the orchestra announced the appointment of Thomas Zehetmair as its next chief conductor, effective with the 2019–2020 season, with an initial contract of three years.

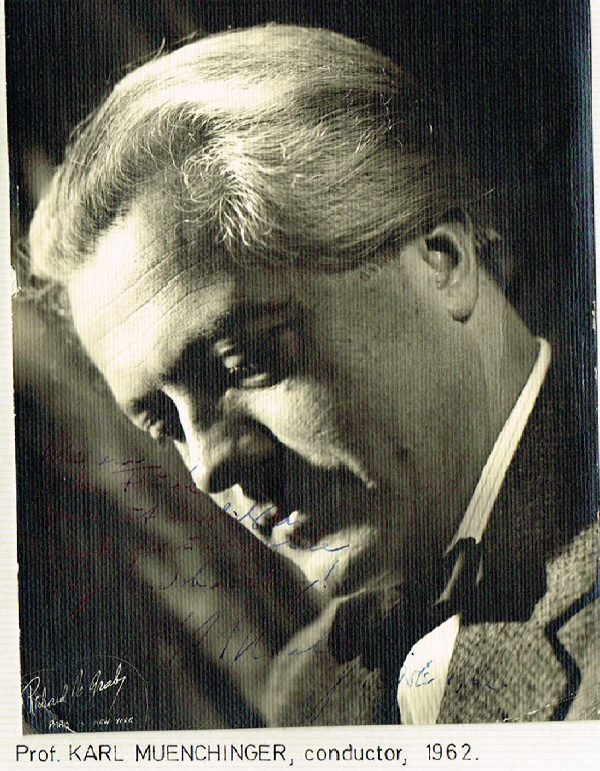
Karl Münchinger, conductor; 1962.

== Chief conductors ==
- Karl Münchinger (1945–1987)
- Martin Sieghart (1990–1995)
- Dennis Russell Davies (1995–2006)
- Michael Hofstetter (2006–2013)
- Matthias Foremny (2013–2019)
- Thomas Zehetmair (2019–present)
