= Milan Munclinger =

Milan Munclinger (3 July 1923 – 30 March 1986) was a Czech flautist, conductor, composer and musical scientist.

== Biography ==
Munclinger was born on 3 July 1923 in Košice, Czechoslovakia. He was the son of Josef Munclinger, an operatic bass and opera-stage manager at the National Theatre in Prague. His mother was an actress at the Slovak National Theatre in Bratislava.

After graduation at the Prague Conservatory in 1948, Munclinger studied conducting (he was a pupil of Václav Talich) and composition at Academy of Performing Arts in Prague. In 1952 he also graduated in musical science, aesthetic, philosophy and oriental studies at Charles University.

He died on 30 March 1986 in Prague.

== Editor and translator ==
Since 1946 he devoted himself to Baroque music. For the first time ever he translated Arnold Dolmetsch's The Interpretation of the Music of the 17th and 18th Centuries Revealed by Contemporary Evidence and several other major HIP works into Czech.

He discovered and edited a large number of archive compositions (he collaborated e.g. with Supraphon Music Publishing, IMC, New York and Bärenreiter-Verlag). He also participated in Musica Antiqua Bohemica series – his František Benda and Franz Xaver Richter flute concerti recordings from 1955 to 1956 were awarded Grand Prix du Disque (Jean-Pierre Rampal - flute, Milan Munclinger – conductor, Prague Chamber Orchestra/Ars Rediviva, Supraphon SUA 190 37, in part reedited in 2002. - See External links: Benda, Stamitz, Rosetti Flute Concertos).

In 1951 he founded the ensemble Ars Rediviva whose performances and recordings played an important role in the revival of Baroque music in Czechoslovakia.

== Other activities ==
He also occupied himself by jazz improvisation and premiered compositions of modern composers (André Jolivet, Ilja Hurník), a number of new works were written for him. He conducted orchestras (e.g. Czech Philharmonic, Prague Radio Orchestra) as well as ensembles focused on early music (Ars Rediviva Orchestra, Prague Chamber Orchestra, Musici de Praga).

He was a co-founder of the Czechoslovak Musical Youth and of the Czech Society for Early Music. Since the 1970s he taught the performance and study of old music at the Conservatoire in Prague.

== Collaboration with Jean-Pierre Rampal ==
With his teacher and friend Jean-Pierre Rampal he collaborated from 1951 till his death in 1986. He was a juror at music performers' competitions (Concours de flûte Jean-Pierre Rampal, 1980 and 1983) and lecturer at performance courses in Bayreuth and Nice (Académie Internationale d'Été Jean-Pierre Rampal). He dedicated to Rampal e.g. his reconstructions of Bach's concerts BWV 1055, 1056 and 1059.

Rampal wrote about Munclinger in his book Musique, ma vie (English: "Music, My Love", Random House, 1989) and dedicated to him his 1986 recording for CBS of C. P. E. Bach flute concertos.
