= Concerto (ballet) =

Ballet created by Kenneth MacMillan

- Choreographer: Kenneth MacMillan
- Music: Dmitri Shostakovich
- Premiere: 30 November 1966; Deutsche Oper Berlin
- Original ballet company: Deutsche Oper Ballet
- Design: Jürgen Rose
- Genre: Neoclassical ballet

Concerto is a one-act ballet in three movements created by Kenneth MacMillan in 1966 for the Deutsche Oper Ballet. The music is Dmitri Shostakovich's Second Piano Concerto (1957). The ballet premiered on 30 November 1966.

== Production ==
External videos
- Concerto - First Movement (Anna Rose O'Sullivan, James Hay; The Royal Ballet), YouTube video
- *Concerto – Second movement pas de deux (Marianela Nuñez, Rupert Pennefather, The Royal Ballet), YouTube video
- Concerto – Final movement (Kenneth MacMillan; The Royal Ballet) , YouTube video

The ballet is plotless and consists of three movements. The first was originated by Didi Carli and Falco Kapuste. The second movement is a pas de deux originated by Lynn Seymour and Rudolf Holz, and was inspired by Seymour's warm up. MacMillan had said that he "decided to incorporate the idea of the barre work into the choreography." The man acts as a "barre" for the female dancer. The third and final movement was intended for a "playful" lead couple, but the male dancer broke his foot prior to the premiere, so MacMillan turned the pas de deux to a female solo, danced by Silvia Kesselheim. The ballet also includes a corps de ballet, that dances in unison, originally 16 women and 8 men. The original design by Jürgen Rose uses a yellow backdrop, and the costumes are in orange, russet and yellow.

== Other companies and revivals ==
Concerto was added to other companies' repertoire. The American Ballet Theatre's co-founder Lucia Chase requested to acquire the ballet immediately after watching the premiere, and the company danced it for the first time in Jacksonville, Florida in 1967, staged by Georgina Parkinson and Wendy Walker. Frederick Ashton also sought to acquire it for Royal Ballet Touring Company (now Birmingham Royal Ballet) , and the company premiered it at the Royal Opera House in 1967. The Royal Ballet debuted Concerto in 1970.

In the 2017, on the 25th anniversary of MacMillan's death, five ballet companies across the UK presented a mixed bill titled Kenneth MacMillan: A National Celebration at the Royal Opera House. Concerto was performed by the Birmingham Royal Ballet, with the lead roles danced by Momoko Hirata, Tzu-Chao Chou, Jenna Roberts, Tyrone Singleton and Delia Mathews.

In June 2020, in the first series of performance since the Royal Opera House's closure due to the 2019-20 coronavirus pandemic, which was broadcast online, The Royal Ballet's Fumi Kaneko and Reece Clarke performed the second movement pas de deux from Concerto.

== Videography ==
A 2010 revival of Concerto danced by the Royal Ballet was filmed and released on a DVD, featuring Yuhui Choe, Steven McRae, Marianela Nuñez, Rupert Pennefather and Helen Crawford. A 2019 performance was relayed in cinemas and was released on a DVD, as a part of a mixed bill. The lead roles were danced by Anna Rose O'Sullivan, James Hay, Yasmine Naghdi, Ryoichi Hirano and Mayara Magri.
