= Didi Carli =

Argentine ballet dancer (born 1943)

Griselda "Didi" Carli (born 5 July 1943) is an Argentine retired ballet dancer.

== Early life and education ==
Carli was born on 5 July 1943 in Ramos Mejía, La Matanza, Buenos Aires Province.

== Career ==
The Russian balletmaster and choreographer Victor Gsovsky had seen Carli dancing at the Teatro Colón in Buenos Aires, and brought her to Europe, where he partnered her with Robert de Warren, to replace Karin von Aroldingen who had left Frankfurt to join John Taras at New York City Ballet. In his biography, Robert de Warren describes her as a "prodigy" capable of dancing the entire role of the Black Swan on a carpet without pointe shoes.

In 1964, Carli appeared as Chloe and Falco Kapuste as Daphnis in the Frankfurt Opera production of Daphnis et Chloé.

In 1966, Carli created the lead female role in Kenneth MacMillan's Concerto at Deutsche Oper Berlin, danced to the music of Dmitri Shostakovich's Second Piano Concerto.

In 1966, Carli also danced the lead in the Deutsche Oper production of Valses nobles et sentimentales with Falco Kapuste.

She retired from dancing at the age of 50 because of hip pain. In her retirement she enjoys painting.

== Recognition ==
In 2021, the Asociación Arte y Cultura awarded her the Premio Olga Ferri.
