= František Brikcius =

Czech cellist

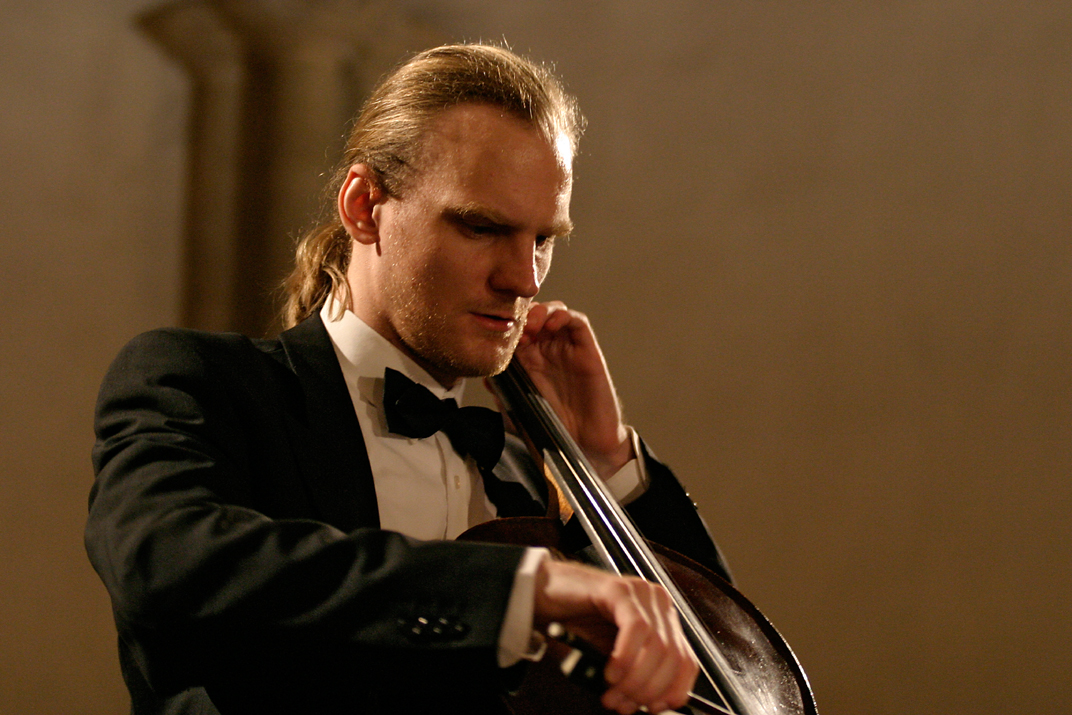
- Czech cellist František Brikcius
- Born: Prague
- Education: Janáček Academy of Music and Performing Arts
- Occupation: Cellist

František Brikcius is a Czech cellist.

== Early life ==
František Brikcius was born in Prague. From early childhood, he began to play the cello and later studied at the Prague Conservatoire under Professor Jaroslav Kulhan. He was accepted into the Janáček Academy of Music and Performing Arts (JAMU) in Brno where he studied cello with Bedřich Havlík. He graduated from JAMU with a MgA degree, under the tutelage of Professor Evžen Rattay, furthered his study at the Toho Gakuen Academy in Japan. and later under the guidance of legendary cellist Professor Anna Shuttleworth (student of Pablo Casals) in the United Kingdom (Eton Cello Master Classes and the University of Leeds).

== Career ==
Brikcius chose to dedicate his life to the interpretation of cello compositions written by composers from the 17th through 21st centuries, with special consideration given to the compositions for cello solo. His favourites are cello suites by Johann Sebastian Bach, Max Reger, Ernest Bloch and Benjamin Britten.

He is particularly involved in researching, studying and performing works by Czech (Antonín Dvořák, Leoš Janáček, Bohuslav Martinů, Josef Suk and Irena Kosíková), Jewish & Terezín (Gideon Klein, Erwin Schulhoff, Zikmund Schul, Jaromír Weinberger, James Simon and David Popper) and contemporary composers (Conrad Beck, Luciano Berio, Pierre Boulez, Benjamin Britten, Henri Dutilleux, Wolfgang Fortner, Alberto Ginastera, Cristobal Halffter, Hans Werner Henze, Heinz Holliger, Klaus Huber and Witold Lutoslawski).

František Brikcius plays a 1904 George Kriwalski cello. With his sister Anna Brikcius, he founded the "Duo Brikcius" which tours in the Czech Republic and abroad in Bosnia and Herzegovina, France, Canada, Germany, Sweden, Turkey, USA and the United Kingdom.

He is artistic director of Festival Brikcius - Chamber Music Concert Series in Prague, Bach Festival Gers in France and Waltham Forest Cello Fest (the 1st London Borough of Culture meets Classical Music) in London.

František works as independent film-maker as well. His first music documentary film MAKANNA (in the cooperation with the Jewish Museum in Prague and under the auspices of Sir Tom Stoppard and Václav Havel) was already screened in the Czech republic, China, Mexico and Portugal. He is currently working on new music documentary film eSACHERe (2022).

As a soloist František has performed at many festivals in Algeria, Austria, Belgium, Bosnia and Herzegovina, Bulgaria, the Czech Republic, France, Germany, Israel, Italy, Japan, Liberland, Pakistan, Poland, Russia, Serbia, Slovakia, Sweden, Turkey, Uzbekistan and the United Kingdom.

František has been teaching cello for many years. He is experienced at taking students at all levels, able to give master classes as well as support beginners. He is giving cello master classes in the United Kingdom, France, Italy and remotely online via Zoom/Skype.

Served as a jury member in various competitions including the Berliner International Music Competition in Germany, the Music and Stars Awards, the Music International Grand Prix, the Sound Espressivo Global Competition, the Palm Beach International Music Awards, the King's Peak International Music Competition and the Baku International Cinema Festival in Azerbaijan.

Brikcius often works with the Talich chamber orchestra, Czech pianist Tomáš Víšek, composer Irena Kosíková and conductor Jan Talich. In 2004 Brikcius and Víšek organized the "Weinberger Tour," celebrating the work of composer Jaromir Weinberger.

== Honors and awards ==
František Brikcius was the winner of the Anglo-Czech Competition in London (1999). He was awarded 2nd prize at The International String Competition London (2000), and 2nd prize at The International String Competition Jihlava (2003). He was a fellow of The Czech Music Foundation (ČHF) in the 2001 and 2002 for the interpretation of contemporary Czech composers. He has also been supported by a number of other international scholarships and fellowships.
