= Guitar Hero World Tour =

2008 video game

- Developer: Neversoft (Note: Ported to PlayStation 2 by Budcat Creations, ported to Wii by Vicarious Visions and ported to Windows and Mac by Aspyr)
- Publisher: Activision (Note: Published to Windows and Mac by Aspyr)
- Series: Guitar Hero
- Platforms: Wii, Xbox 360, PlayStation 3, PlayStation 2, Microsoft Windows, Mac OS X, N-Gage 2.0, J2ME, BlackBerry OS, Android
- Release: Wii, Xbox 360: NA: October 26, 2008; EU: November 7, 2008; AU: November 12, 2008; PlayStation 3: NA: October 26, 2008; AU: November 12, 2008; EU: November 14, 2008; PlayStation 2: NA: October 26, 2008; AU: November 12, 2008; EU: November 21, 2008; Microsoft Windows, Mac OS X: NA: July 26, 2009; N-Gage 2.0: WW: 18 September 2009
- Genre: Rhythm
- Modes: Single-player, multiplayer

Guitar Hero World Tour is a 2008 rhythm game developed by Neversoft and published by Activision. It is the fourth main installment and the sixth overall installment in the Guitar Hero series. The game was launched in North America in October 2008 for the PlayStation 2, PlayStation 3, Wii, and Xbox 360 consoles, and a month later for Europe and Australia. A version of World Tour for Microsoft Windows and Mac OS X was published by Aspyr in July 2009. A mobile version developed by Hands-On Mobile was released for BlackBerry, Android, Java, and the N-Gage platform.

While the game continues to feature the use of a guitar-shaped controller to simulate the playing of rock music, Guitar Hero World Tour is the first game in the Guitar Hero series to feature drum and microphone controllers for percussion and vocal parts. This is in many ways similar to the competing Rock Band series of games. The game allows users to create new songs through the "Music Studio" mode, which can then be uploaded and shared through a service known as "GHTunes". Due to hardware limitations, the PlayStation 2 version uses pre-rendered venues combined with real-time character models.

World Tour received generally positive reviews, with critics responding positively to the quality of the instrument controllers, the customization abilities, and improvements in the game's difficulty compared with the previous Guitar Hero III: Legends of Rock (2007).

== Gameplay ==
Guitar Hero World Tour builds on the gameplay from previous Guitar Hero games, in which players attempt to simulate the playing of rock music using special guitar-shaped controllers. World Tour expands beyond the core guitar-based gameplay by introducing the ability to play drums and sing vocals, and supports the ability for up to four players to play together in a virtual band through these different instruments. Successfully hitting notes increases the player's or band's score, as well as increase the "Rock Meter" that represents the song's performance. Missed notes are not scored and negatively affect the Rock Meter. If the Rock Meter drops too low, the song ends prematurely, with the virtual audience booing the band off stage. Completing a consecutive series of notes successfully will increase a scoring multiplier for that player up to 4x. This multiplier is doubled when the player activates star power. Similar to Rock Band, the band shares a common score, scoring multiplier and band performance meter while each player has their own performance metric; the band also shares the same "Star Power" meter, though any player may activate it at any time. A player that performs poorly and reduces their performance meter to zero can still continue to play, but they drain the overall performance meter for the band, requiring the other players to make up for this. Successfully completing a song garners a three to five-star rating based on the accumulated score, and rewards such as in-game money that can be used to buy new guitars and outfits for characters.

The guitar interface remains relatively unchanged in World Tour. As with previous Guitar Hero titles, the guitar and bass player must hold down the correct fret button(s) on the controller while strumming in time with the notes as they scroll on-screen. One addition to the guitar gameplay is the ability to play notes while holding a sustained note. Additionally, the bass guitar player is required to play notes representing an open E string, which is shown on-screen as a solid line across their note track. To play these notes, the bass guitar player strums the controller without pressing any fret button keys. The drum interface is similar to the guitar's interface, with each on-screen note track equivalent to a colored drum head on the controller, with the bass drum indicated by a line across the note track. The drum player only needs to hit the correct drum pads simultaneously to the note gems to successfully play their track. There are also marked sections indicating drum fills wherein the player may play any notes they wish in a 'solo' to gain points. The vocal track requires the player to match the pitch of the notes in a manner similar to Karaoke Revolution to be successful. Special sections of each player's note track are marked with glowing notes, which, if completed successfully, builds up Star Power. Once enough Star Power is accumulated, it can be released via various means to double the band's current score multiplier. For guitar and bass, this is done by lifting the guitar controller vertically or (though not in bass) by pressing a button on the guitar face; for drums, by striking both cymbal pads on the controller at the same time; for vocals, by tapping the microphone or making a similarly quick sound. Star Power's use has been modified over previous Guitar Hero entries in that Star Power can now be accumulated even when Star Power is in use by successfully completing additional Star Power phrases, which extends the Star Power's duration.

In addition to the standard four difficulty levels (Easy, Medium, Hard, and Expert) for each song and instrument, a new Beginner level has been added in World Tour. This difficulty is aimed for younger and unskilled players; notes are generally simple straight lines in time with bass drum beats, and allowing any or no fret button to be held while the note is strummed (for lead and bass guitar), any drum to be hit (for drums), or any sound to be made (for vocals).

=== Game modes ===
The primary single-player game mode is Career mode, which can be played on the lead guitar, bass guitar, drums, or vocals. Career mode has been slightly altered from previous Guitar Hero games. After creating a band, selecting or creating an avatar, and then selecting an instrument, the player is then presented with one of several gigs containing two to five songs each. Most gigs end with an encore song that is not revealed until the other songs are completed. Two of the lead guitar gigs feature "boss challenges" with Zakk Wylde and Ted Nugent; these boss challenges, featuring original songs by Wylde and Nugent, are different from Guitar Hero III: Legends of Rock's boss battle, removing the focus on attack power-ups and instead featuring a call-and-response mechanic similar to the existing Face-Off mode. The gigs are arranged by difficulty based on the selected instrument. The player is awarded in-game money for each song completed, and completing each gig can also award additional money for meeting certain criteria, such as never letting the Rock Meter drop below a certain level or playing the first several notes of a song perfectly. Completing a gig can also unlock one or more gigs with more difficult songs to complete. Additional awards, such as customization items, are also awarded for completing gigs. The player's accumulated earnings across any of the single player Career Modes are tracked and used to rank the player's overall performance level.

Gameplay of a whole band playing Billy Idol's "Rebel Yell". On top is vocalist, bottom from left to right: Guitar, Drums, Bass.

Band Career mode is similar to the solo Career mode, with the game songs presented as several gigs to be completed. A band must have at least two players to proceed. The second player may be either a local player or one over the network. Players may be at different levels of progression in the game, but still gain benefits for successfully completing songs when playing together. The in-game interface features vocals along the top of the screen, and three tracks underneath, for bass, drums, and guitar; only tracks for active players are shown. Full four-player bands can compete with other bands online in a Battle of the Bands mode.

Both single players and bands can play a setlist of up to six songs in Quickplay mode, still earning in-game money rewards for their performances. Existing competitive modes from the series, including the Battle Mode from Guitar Hero III, are also present in the game.

The Wii version of the game features a special "Mii Freestyle" mode that allows players to use their Miis as their characters as they improvise songs via the guitar and drum controllers or using the Wii Remote and Nunchuk.

=== Characters and customization ===
Players are able to alter aspects of existing characters or customize their own character and instrument within Guitar Hero World Tour.

Players are able to use the Create-a-Rocker mode which is based on the Create-a-Skater mode in Neversoft's Tony Hawk series and the advanced character creation scheme from the Tiger Woods PGA Tour series. Players can change their character's poise, clothing, tattoos, makeup, and age. Selected characters from previous Guitar Hero games are available as templates for creating a rocker. Previous games featured Gibson Guitars, but as a result of a lawsuit with Gibson Guitars, branded guitars are not featured; instead, the player can create a customized guitar from various components, such as bodies, fretboards, and headstocks. The player's in-game drum set and microphone can also be similarly customized. The 14 starting characters of the game can be customized too; however, their customization is limited to clothing and accessories only. Activision had formed partnerships with several instrument equipment manufactures to be featured in the game, including Ampeg, Audio-Technica, EMG Pickups, Ernie Ball, Evans Drumheads, Guitar Center, Krank Amplification, Mackie, Marshall, Orange County Drum & Percussion, Pork Pie Percussion, Regal Tip, Sabian, Vox and Zildjian.

In addition to the computer- and player-controlled characters, avatars of notable musicians are featured in the game, either with motion capture or the licensing of their image for their character. Such playable artists include Hayley Williams of Paramore, Jimi Hendrix, Ozzy Osbourne, Zakk Wylde, the Smashing Pumpkins' frontman Billy Corgan, Sting, Ted Nugent, and Travis Barker.

New venues in the game include virtual recreations of real arenas, such as Ozzfest, Amoeba Music, Live Nation's House of Blues, Sunset Strip and the San Francisco Giants' stadium, AT&T Park. One venue showcases the trademark art style of Tool and was developed in collaboration with the band. World Tour is the first Activision game on the PlayStation 3 to support dynamic in-game advertising provided by IGA Worldwide; similar advertising for the Xbox 360 version is provided by Massive Incorporated.

=== Instruments ===
==== Guitar and bass guitar ====
"Slider Gems", note gems connected by a semi-transparent colored line, can be played by sliding one's fingers up and down the touch-sensitive pad on the new World Tour guitar controller, or, alternatively, by simply pressing the corresponding fret button like with hammer-ons and pull-offs (albeit without needing to strum at all) if using an older Guitar Hero controller that does not have the touch-pad.

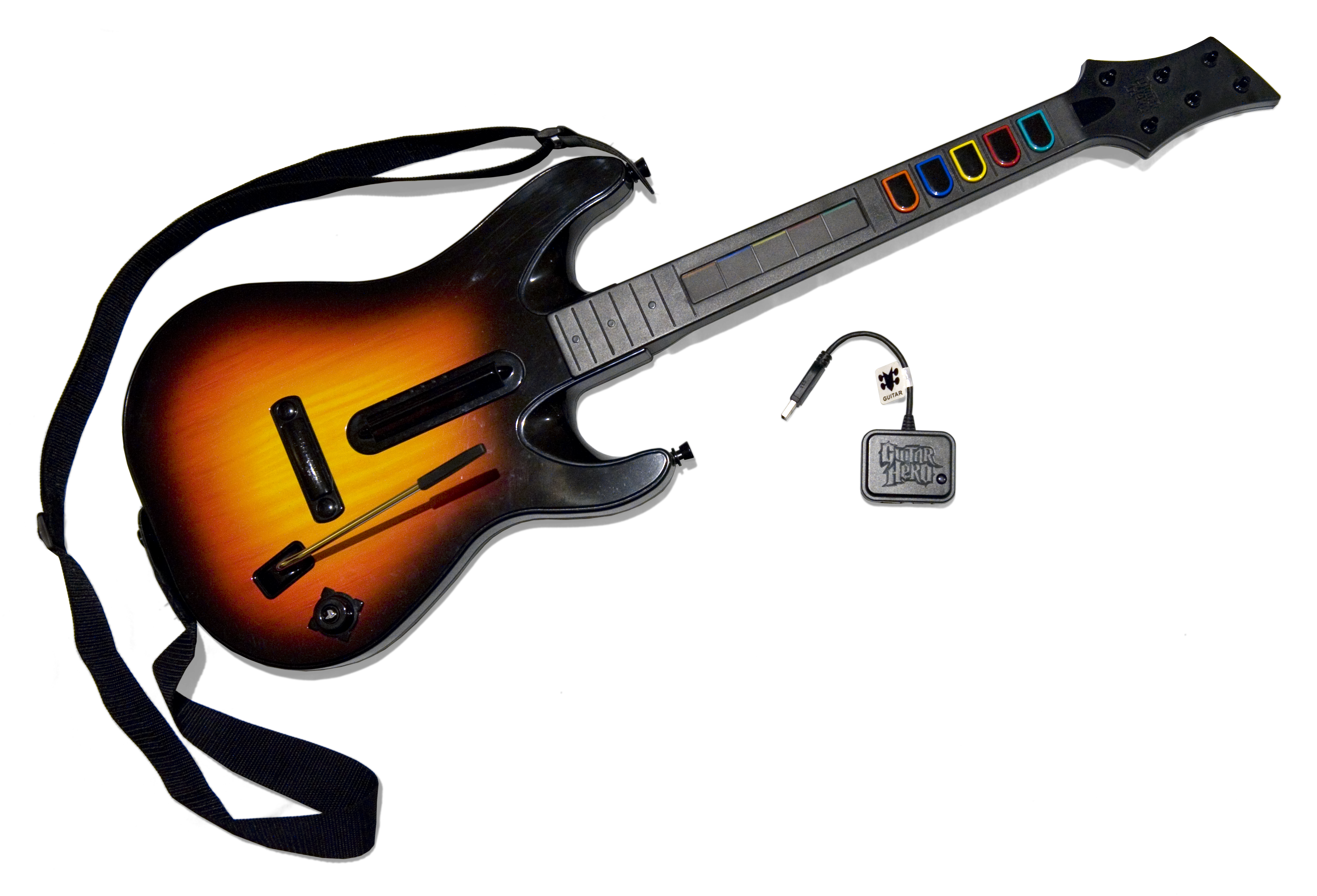
PS3 version of the Guitar Hero World Tour controller

RedOctane developed a new guitar controller for World Tour. The unit is approximately 25% larger than previous controllers, making it closer to the size of a real guitar. The new controller includes a longer whammy bar and places the Star Power button directly below the strum bar, improving the access of these features. The strum bar itself was made quieter and longer. The neck of the guitar is detachable, similar to the Gibson Les Paul controller for Guitar Hero III, but the connector has been hardened to avoid connection issues experienced with the previous unit. The neck of the guitar features a touch-sensitive pad just toward the body end from the normal five fret buttons. The player can use either the fret buttons or the touch pad to play regular notes. The pad also allows the player to play notes via tapping or via "tap strumming" similar to the slap bass method for bass guitar, and to alter the pitch of sustained notes. Guitar tracks feature notes connected by a semi-transparent purple line, (except for the Wii and PlayStation 2 version, in which semi-transparent gems replace this purple line) called "Slider Gems"; the player can play these notes by sliding their fingers up and down the touch pad or by tapping the fret buttons without strumming. The touchpad can also be used for sustained and staccato notes in the music studio feature while recording guitar, and is used for finer control over loops when recording other instruments.

==== Drums ====
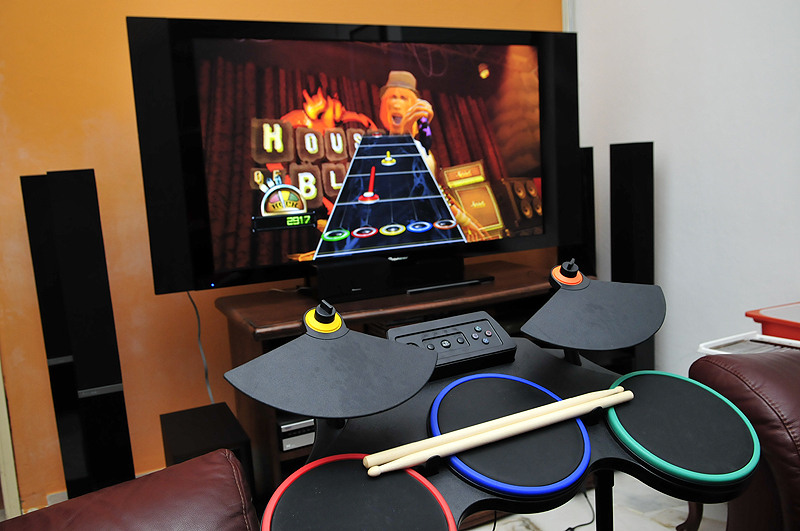
PS3 version of the Guitar Hero World Tour drum kit

World Tour features a wireless six-piece drum kit, with a bass drum pedal and five velocity-sensitive drum pads, which Activision has stated provide the "most realistic drum experience ever in a video game". Generally, the pads represent the snare drum (red), the tom-tom drum (blue), the floor tom (green), the hi-hat cymbal (yellow), and the crash cymbal (orange), however, they can be used for other percussion instruments depending on the song. The bass drum is represented by a purple, horizontal line on the highway, which players must use the drum pedal to hit. The drum kit was designed with help from John Devacka, the developer of MTV Drumscape, and developed key patents used for most modern music games that are now owned by Activision. Special note gems on the drum track, representing accent notes, are "armored", requiring the player to strike the corresponding drum head harder in order to break the armor and score more points. During song creation, the velocity sensitivity feature of the drum pad allows players to alter the sounds made by the drums. The drum set also has a MIDI input port in the back, allowing users to connect a compatible MIDI drum kit to play in the game. The Wii version of the drum controller includes a slot for the Wii Remote to fit into, enabling it to become wireless, much like the guitar controller introduced for the Wii version of Guitar Hero III.

==== Microphone ====
The official microphone used for vocals uses a USB connection. For other consoles, such as the Xbox 360 and PlayStation 3, a headset can also be used as an alternative, but has proven to be less reliable as it tends not to pick up the audio from the player. When playing vocals, a standard game controller, or Wii Remote on the Wii version, is necessary in order to navigate menus, select difficulties and pause. The microphone can also be used as a standard recording device when connected to a casual PC USB port. The computer recognizes the device as a Logitech Recording Device.

Logitech and Activision announced that the former company would produce "premium" instruments to be released later in 2008.

==== Instrument compatibility ====
World Tour works with older Guitar Hero guitar controllers. Activision stated during their E3 2008 press conference that Xbox 360 users would be able to use the existing Rock Band instrument controllers as well as other third party controllers in Guitar Hero World Tour; Rock Band instruments for the PlayStation 3 are not guaranteed to work in World Tour, though Sony is attempting to help make these units compatible. All Rock Band original Harmonix instruments for PlayStation 2 work with World Tour. According to issue 027 of the UK's Official PlayStation Magazine, all Guitar Hero and Rock Band PS3 controllers are cross-compatible with all games (except for Guitar Hero: World Tour drums on Rock Band, however some require patching, which is done automatically when connected to the internet). Wired Xbox 360 and PlayStation 3 instruments also work on the PlayStation 2 versions of World Tour, as well as later Guitar Hero games.

Console makers have helped to ensure instrument compatibility between current and upcoming guitar and band games. Both Sony and Microsoft announced that instruments for World Tour, Rock Band 2, and Konami's Rock Revolution would work between all three games on the PlayStation 3 and Xbox 360. The Wii version of the game only supports guitar controllers from previous Guitar Hero games, and "no compatibility with any other peripherals".

World Tour adjusts the tracks in the game to account for the instrument controller being used. For example, sections of the lead guitar track that are designed to be played on the new World Tour controller's touchpad can be played by tapping the frets on older controllers without strumming. When using Rock Band's drum controller, which has one fewer percussion pad than the World Tour unit and lacks velocity sensitivity, two of the lanes on the "World Tour" drum board merge, reducing the note track to four drum pads and bass pedal, and no armored notes are presented.

== Development ==
The fourth major entry to the Guitar Hero series, at the time named Guitar Hero IV, was officially announced upon the merger of Activision and Vivendi Games in December 2007. "We couldn't have done it without Red Octane's support." says the Guitar Hero Team. The game's new name, Guitar Hero World Tour, was officially announced by Activision in May 2008.

Activision and RedOctane had previously registered for trademarks on "Guitar Villain", "Drum Villain", "Keyboard Hero", "Drum Hero" and "Band Hero". Analysts speculated that future Guitar Hero would need to include additional instrument peripherals in order to compete against former Guitar Hero developer Harmonix's Rock Band. Activision's CEO Bobby Kotick and early previews of the game revealed that Guitar Hero IV would branch out into other instruments and vocals.

According to the Game Informer preview, the addition of drum functionality came from work initially done towards the Drum Hero title. This work was later folded into the Guitar Hero series after Neversoft was chosen as developer of the series. Neversoft's Allen Flores stated that with the addition of the existing drum gameplay, the development of World Tour took under a year, starting development immediately after the release of Guitar Hero III. The drum instrument controller was designed to be more realistic, with input from Chad Smith (of Red Hot Chili Peppers), Stewart Copeland (of The Police) and Travis Barker (of Blink-182), all of whom requested the elevated cymbal pads. The ability to open-strum the guitar was a feature that was planned for Guitar Hero III but was removed before release, finding that it was too difficult on the guitar tracks. However, they built this feature in from the start of World Tour development for the bass guitar tracks.

Bright describes the development of the note track for a given song once it has been licensed for the game as a parallel effort, a process that they have found to be more efficient than their previous work on the Tony Hawk games. Once the song was mixed for use by the development team, a "tempo map" was created by one developer; this map denotes the beats in the music which then can be used by the rest of the development team. Once the tempo map was complete, the song was then distributed to the various teams, such as the specific instrument teams or to the animators, to complete the song. Note-for-note tracking from the song was then performed, and in some cases, changes were made to account for sections that cannot be replicated on the game controllers; the final track represented the note track for the Expert difficulty of the song. Note tracks were then reduced and adjusted to create the note tracks for the lower difficulties in the game. A difficulty assessment was made using the final note tracks to determine where the songs were to be placed in the soundtrack progression. The difficulty model is based on that from Guitar Hero: Aerosmith, which was adjusted from the Guitar Hero III model after the team received negative feedback from players regarding a "brick wall" in the difficulty progression in that game.

The song list for World Tour started as the list of songs that Neversoft wanted to include in Guitar Hero III, but had failed to get into the game or as downloadable content; the list was eventually expanded to over 500 songs. The song list was then prioritized based on what the team thought would be best in the game, and then going after the music that would take the longest time to license, as was the case for the Jimi Hendrix songs. While songs were selected to make sure that guitar, bass, and drums all had great parts, they also opted for songs that would be strong for one single instrument as to make the game still appealing for those playing the single player modes. Some songs were also suggested through the licensing efforts by Activision for inclusion in the game. Flores stated that the inclusion of caricatures of recording artists in the game was either due to the team seeking that specific artist for the game, or the artist approaching the development team and requesting to be part of it. The band Tool, which hasn't licensed its music since 1996, allowed for the inclusion of three of its songs in World Tour as long they were involved with the artwork and tracking of the songs for the game, leading to the creation of the art-like Tool venue.

Bright noted that they had support for "epic drum solos", in which the band animation would focus on the drummer, but removed this feature from the game's final release due to its complexity. They also had to remove the "Jam Over" mode planned for the game's music creation section that would have allowed players to start with one of the game's songs and play over it on their instruments; this feature was removed in order to keep the final product polished and on-time.

The custom song creation feature was inspired by the current "hacking environment" that has arisen from the first two Guitar Hero games, where players would create new tracks and share them with others.

Hands-On Mobile has secured the worldwide rights to create a mobile phone version of the game to be released later in 2008. A version of the game has been rated by the ESRB for Microsoft Windows computers, though Activision has not officially confirmed this version.

A PC version of Guitar Hero World Tour was confirmed by Intel on February 27, 2009 and displayed at CeBIT on March 3–8, 2009 in Hannover, Germany.

=== Bundling and promotion ===
World Tour is available in several bundle packages, as well as the stand-alone game. In addition to a game bundle that includes a wireless guitar for each platform, the game can be bought in one of two bundles that include the guitar, drums, and microphone controller. The second bundle, only available through RedOctane's store, also includes a T-shirt, keychain, and a recharging kit. Players in the United Kingdom who pre-order the full band bundle also received a second guitar controller for bass players. The bass guitar is the Les Paul guitar, the same model as bundled with Guitar Hero III: Legends of Rock. During the Christmas season of 2008, Some retailers, such as Target, sold in-store a dual guitar bundle which included two identical wireless Les Paul styled guitars from previous game versions and did not include the new guitar with the tapping area.

Activision created a series of television advertisements directed by Brett Ratner based on the famous scene from Risky Business where Tom Cruise dances to Bob Seger's "Old Time Rock and Roll" in a shirt and underwear, each featuring a different set of celebrities lip synching to the lyrics while using the new instrument controllers. The first ad included athletes Kobe Bryant, Tony Hawk, Alex Rodriguez, and Michael Phelps. Another ad spot featured model Heidi Klum; two versions of Klum's ad exist, one a "director's cut" where she is wearing less clothing. A subsequent commercial featuring model Marisa Miller was banned from airing as too racy.

A YouTube viral video entitled "Bike Hero" showed what appeared to be a teenager riding a bike along a route marked with symbols similar in appearance to the in-game note tracks with LED lights on the handlebars blinking in time to the notes to the song "Prisoner of Society" by The Living End. The video was later determined to be the work of a viral marketing company Droga5 in cooperation with Activision to promote the Guitar Hero games. The viral advertisement was considered a success, with about 3.5 million views since its release.

== Soundtrack ==
All of the 86 songs in the game are master recordings, a first for the series. Project director Brian Bright claims that they have "a pretty even split between the '80s, '90s, and classic rock" with a "good amount of emerging bands". Some of the songs from the disc are exportable to both Guitar Hero 5 and Band Hero for a small fee, with music licensing rights limiting which songs can be exported.

=== Custom songs ===
Guitar Hero World Tour allows for players to create their own songs note-by-note or in real-time.

Guitar Hero World Tour allows players to create their own songs through the "Music Studio" and share them with others through the Xbox Live, PlayStation Network, and Nintendo Wi-Fi Connection internet capabilities. The Studio is similar to Apple's GarageBand software. The player can create the tracks for each song by playing it in real or slowed time, with the game quantizing offbeat notes to the nearest beat as set by the player, or tracks can be constructed one note at a time. The notes played by the user are the default "Expert" difficulty track, and the lower difficulty versions are generated by the game.

Players can create the tracks for lead, rhythm, and bass guitars and for drums, selecting from a number of different sounds and kits for each instrument. Distortion and other effects can be added to these tracks through Line 6 amplifiers in the "GHMix" mode. Players cannot record vocals directly, but can create a hum-along vocal line in the Studio. PlayStation 3 users with MIDI-compatible computers are also able to connect their computer to the console and use it for song composition; a similar feature is sought for Xbox 360 owners. Eurogamer reported that a crew at Activision was able to successfully create a "perfectly respectable cover" version of the first verse of "Smells Like Teen Spirit" by Nirvana.

Custom songs can be uploaded to the "GH Tunes" service, allowing other players to rate songs and search and download songs by these ratings. A Showcase service provides some of the best user works alongside new songs from popular artists for players to download. Players can only upload five songs to the service at the start, but players that have highly rated songs gain the ability to upload more. Bright stated that uploaded songs would be actively monitored, and that covers of copyrighted songs would be removed from the service while also taking down any other requests made by copyright owners. The PlayStation 2 version of the game features custom song creation, but does not support the uploading service.

=== Downloadable content ===
In addition to custom songs, players of the Xbox 360, PlayStation 3, and Wii versions were able to download new licensed songs for the game. However, on March 31, 2014, Activision removed this content from being downloadable and there is no evidence it will become available again.

This is the first game in the Guitar Hero series that supported download functionality on the Wii. Wii users are able to store downloaded songs on either the Wii's internal memory or on an SD card in a "Rock Archive", and then were able to add songs to playlists from this. When playing tracks stored on an SD card, each song was automatically copied to a "content cache" on the Wii's flash memory for play and then deleted after the song is finished. This required about 200 free memory blocks on the Wii.

Neversoft and Activision expressed intentions to release downloadable content more frequently, but this has yet to materialize since the game was released in 2008. Downloadable content was available through the in-game store and includes full album downloads and more regular releases compared to Guitar Hero III. Most existing downloadable content for Guitar Hero III is not playable in World Tour, due to the lack of having tracks for all four instruments for the latter game. However, with the release of Metallica's Death Magnetic, the developers were able to prepare the tracks in Guitar Hero III to have the required portions needed for World Tour, and thus these tracks are forward-compatible. Activision has also stated that they are considering a monthly subscription service to deliver downloadable content to users for future games. Most of the downloadable content (152 of 158 songs as of early August 2009) is exportable to both Guitar Hero 5 and Band Hero, updated to include new features introduced in those games. However, Guitar Hero 5 downloadable content is not playable in World Tour.

== Technical issues ==
Users encountered several technical issues with the instrument controllers upon release of the game. Most often cited was the drum controller failing to register drum hits by the player. Some users have also found that, despite the assurance of instrument compatibility, the PlayStation 3 World Tour drum kit does not work with Rock Band 2, however the 1.1 patch for Rock Band 2 on PS3 has fixed this issue. Users have also noted that the wireless guitar strum bar may fail after a few hours of playing. Activision has acknowledged that drum sets from earlier manufacturing processes may be prone to these errors, and have set up several support threads on their Guitar Hero forums to address the issue and assist users in equipment replacement.

== Reception ==
Reviews

Aggregate scores
| Aggregator | Score |
|---|---|
| GameRankings | 85% (X360/PS3); 87% (Wii); 81% (PS2) |
| Metacritic | 85/100 (X360); 86/100 (Wii); 84/100 (PS3) |

Review scores
| Publication | Score |
|---|---|
| 1Up.com | A− |
| Eurogamer | 9.0/10 |
| Game Informer | 9.25/10 (X360/PS3) |
| GameSpot | 8.0/10 (X360/PS3); 8.0/10 (Wii) |
| GameSpy | 9.0/10 |
| IGN | 7.9/10 (X360/PS3); 8.8/10 (Wii) |
| Official Nintendo Magazine | 92% |
| X-Play | 4/5 |
| Wired | 8/10 |

Guitar Hero World Tour has received generally positive reviews from critics, many making comparisons between it and the Rock Band series. 1UP noted that while World Tour is not as good a "party game" as Rock Band, the game still provides "great peripherals and fun-to-play music" and delivers what the player should expect. GameTrailers stated that "another viable challenger has stepped onto the stage." IGN's review was lukewarm, noting that "A number of things it tries to accomplish were already done better in Rock Band", but stated that the game would be a good "stepping point" for the next iteration of the series.

While reviewers were satisfied with the single player modes of the game, the Band tour mode was considered weaker than Rock Band's Tour mode. The interface for a full band, despite being similar to Rock Band, was found to be confusing, making it difficult to determine if a fellow bandmember was about to fail or identifying how much Star Power the band had accumulated. The Band tour was found to be little different from the single player modes, and lacked the additional incentives and challenges that Rock Band had. The note charts and the game's difficulty curve were found to be significantly easier than the more punishing ones in Guitar Hero III. Critics did observe poor note charting, stating that some of the song charts "simply don't match the music" and that "you'll be asked to hit notes where there are none, or not hit notes that are there." The soundtrack was generally praised for containing all master recordings. However, critics found that the setlist contains very few standout hits, and that the inclusion of a number of foreign-language and difficult-to-recognize songs weakened the overall list. Reviews also commented on the number of songs that overlapped with Rock Band 2's set list.

Reviews of the instrument peripherals for World Tour were mixed. The new touchpad on the guitar controller was found to be imprecise to make it difficult to use during difficult song sections and would sometimes fail to register taps or slides; some of these issues were attributed to initial manufacturing problems. The drum kit has been praised for the ease of setup, the drum pad layout, and the response of the drums, though the lack of a means to fix the location of bass drum pedal was seen as a drawback when compared to the Rock Band drum kit.

The music creation feature of the game, while seen as a useful addition to the game, was found to be difficult to use, suffered from on-screen lag that could interfere with song creation, and the quality of the resulting songs were compared to ring tones for cell phones. The character customization in World Tour was generally seen as an improvement over the limitations of Rock Band. However, reviewers noted that the use of the real-life celebrities against the cartoon-like visuals, along with the emphasis on the band and not individual players, made their presence "anachronistic".

The Wii version received additional praise from reviewers, mostly from the changes in the Wii operation to accommodate the game's Music Store and online play features. The Mii Freestyle Mode was also found to be a good addition, allowing the game to be accessible for younger players. IGN noted that most of the credit for the Wii version is due to Vicarious Visions, as that "the only real aspects that hold the game back from being truly amazing overall are - oddly enough - the ones implemented by Neversoft's core design". It was awarded Best Music/Rhythm Game on the Wii by IGN in its 2008 video game awards. IGN also nominated it for several other Wii-specific awards, including Best Family Game, Best Online Multiplayer Game, and Game of the Year. During the 12th Annual Interactive Achievement Awards, the Academy of Interactive Arts & Sciences nominated World Tour for "Outstanding Achievement in Soundtrack". In 2009, Official Nintendo Magazine remarked "It rocks!", placing the game 42nd on a list of greatest Nintendo games.

World Tour sold more than 534,000 units during its first week of release, less than half of the sales of Guitar Hero III during the same period, with the Wii version selling the most with 183,000 units. During the month of November 2008, 978,000 units were sold, with 475,000 being for the Wii platform. The Wii version was the fifth best-selling game of December 2008 in the United States, selling in excess of 850,000 copies. The PlayStation 2 version was the 17th best-selling game and best-selling PlayStation 2 game of the same month in that region. The Xbox 360 and PlayStation 3 versions did not rank, but ranked the sixth and fifth best-selling games respectively for their respective systems. World Tour sold 3.4 million copies across all platforms in North America during 2008. Full band bundles represented 41% of all unit sales of World Tour through January 2009, equating to 61% of the game's revenue, while 35% of unit sales and 27% of total revenues came from the guitar and game bundle. In a March 2011 list, the NPG Group placed World Tour as the 7th highest-grossing game in the United States since 1995.

=== Awards ===
- IGN Best of 2008:
  - Best Music/Rhythm Game (Wii)
- Game Informer: Included in "The Top 50 Games of 2008".
- Kids Choice Award (2009) Favorite Video Game.

== Guitar Hero World Tour - Definitive Edition ==
Custom character models such as Kratos, Carl Johnson and Snow White are a popular form of modification in World Tour Definitive Edition, allowing fans to come up with their own humorous fictional crossovers.

Guitar Hero: World Tour - Definitive Edition (or GHWTDE for short) is a community-made mod of the PC version of World Tour. It not only contains every song from the base game, but players can add additional songs backported from previous and future Guitar Hero games along with their animations, as well as community-made characters, instruments and venues released on Nexus Mods. The game also contains a debug menu, additional practice speeds, additional content for the in-game character creator, and customization of the game's graphics, loading screen, gem theme, and more. The mod is still in active development and has been continuously updated since its launch in December 2021.

== See also ==
- Clone Hero
- Frets on Fire X
- JamLegend
- Ultimate Band
