= Josef František Munclinger =

Czech operatic bass and opera stage director

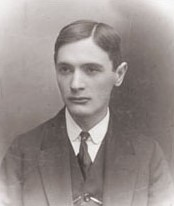
Josef František Munclingr before 1928

Josef František Munclinger, also Josef František Munclingr (13 September 1888 in Nítkovice, Austria-Hungary – 31 October 1954 in Mariánské Lázně, Czechoslovakia) was a Czech operatic bass and opera stage director who had an active international career from the 1910s through the 1950s. His voice is preserved on a number of recordings made for the Ultraphon and Supraphon labels.

== Biography ==
At the age of six he lost both his parents and grew up in Lemberg (then Poland) where his uncle played in the theatre orchestra. He simultaneously studied at the philosophy faculty of the University of Lemberg and at the Lemberg Conservatory (singing and composition with Stanisław Niewiadomski and Mieczysław Sołtys). In 1911 he made his professional opera debut at the Lviv Opera as Colline in Giacomo Puccini's La bohème. In the season 1913-1914 he sang at the Great Theatre in Poznań. During the 1916-1919 he was the member of Studio Piotrowsky, Teatr Stołeczny and Teatr Wielki in Warsaw. In 1915 he made also his opera directing debut with an expressionistic performance of The Tales of Hoffmann by Jacques Offenbach.

In 1921 Munclinger left Poland to join the Slovak National Theatre in Bratislava where he was committed until 1924. At this theatre he staged numerous premieres, among them the famous Slovak premiere of Káťa Kabanová in 1923 in the presence of Leoš Janáček who appreciated Munclinger's performance as the best at that time. During his engagement in Bratislava Munclinger married the actress Lenka Honty.

After his Vienna tour in 1925 Josef František Munclinger was engaged as a soloist at the Vienna State Opera. He signed already the contract but shortly after signing he preferred the offer of cooperation by the new Opera chief at the National Theatre in Prague Otakar Ostrčil and became for more than 25 years (between 1925 and 1951) a significant opera stage director and singer of this prominent Czech stage. He sang the Magician in the world premiere of Jaromír Weinberger's Schwanda the Bagpiper on 27 April 1927 as well as the role of the second apprentice in the Czech premiere of Alban Berg's Wozzeck on 11 November 1926. In 1942 he starred in the world premiere of František Škroup's Columbus (composed in 1855). Among the other roles he performed Basilio in The Barber of Seville, Beneš in Dalibor, Chrudoš in Libuše, Gian Francesci in La Juive, the Grand Inquisitor in Don Carlos, Herrmann in Tannhäuser, Kecal in The Bartered Bride, Malina in The Secret, Marbuel in The Devil and Kate, Mephistopheles in Faust, Ramfis in Aida, Scarpia in Tosca, Tonio in Pagliacci, Vodník in Rusalka, and Volfram Olbramovič in The Brandenburgers in Bohemia.

Since the 1920s Munclinger worked as a guest artist at the opera houses and concert stages in Budapest, Vienna, Berlin, Paris, Poznaň and Warsaw. After his retirement from the National Theatre in Prague in 1951 he was also active as a teacher at the Janáček Academy of Music and Performing Arts in Brno where he stimulated and helped to establish the first opera directing department. He tutored numerous Czech and Slovak opera directors.

Josef Munclinger also wrote books on dramatic art (e.g. Hercova tvář a maska), translated and wrote opera librettos, worked as scenic designer and upgraded the Czech stage directing with technical news like projected scene or sound amplifiers.

Having never retired from the stage, Munclinger died in Mariánské Lázně in 1954 at the age of 66. His son Milan Munclinger was an important conductor, flutist and musicologist and his brother-in-law Tibor Honty was a notable Czech photographer.

== Sources ==
- Munclingr, Josef František (1940). Hercova tvář a maska (Actor's face and mask) (in Czech). Prague.
- Československý hudební slovník osob a institucí, II (Czechoslovak Music Dictionary) (in Czech). Prague: Státní hudební vydavatelství (State Music Publishers). 1965.
- Sláma, František (2001). Z Herálce do Šangrilá a zase nazpátek (From Herálec to Shangri-La) (in Czech). Říčany: Orego. ISBN 80-86117-61-8.
