= Waltham Forest Cello Fest =

The Waltham Forest Cello Fest is a cello festival based in the London Borough of Waltham Forest, north-east London.

== History ==
Festival was created in 2019 as a cello celebration of the communities in Waltham Forest the first ever Mayor's London Borough of Culture. The WFCF was supported by Make It Happen - London Borough of Waltham Forest.

=== 2019 ===
The 1st Waltham Forest Cello Fest commemorated the 334th anniversary of the birth of Johann Sebastian Bach, the 327th anniversary of the birth if Italian baroque composer Giuseppe Tartini, the 200th anniversary of the birth of German - French composer and cellist Jacques Offenbach, the 100th anniversary of the birth of Jewish composer Gideon Klein - Gideon Klein Centenary, the 100th anniversary of the birth of American Jazz Cellist Fred Katz - Fred Katz Centenary, the 60th anniversary of the death of Swiss-born American composer Ernest Bloch and London's first ever Borough of Culture in 2019!

=== 2020 ===
The 2nd Waltham Forest Cello Fest scheduled many cello events to commemorate the 335th anniversary of the birth of Johann Sebastian Bach, the 250th anniversary of the birth of Ludwig van Beethoven, the 250th anniversary of the death of Italian baroque composer Giuseppe Tartini, the 175th anniversary of the birth of French composer Gabriel Fauré, the 140th anniversary of the birth of Swiss - American composer Ernest Bloch, the 140th anniversary of the death of French - German composer Jacques Offenbach, the 140th anniversary of the birth of Jewish composer James Simon, the 100th anniversary of the birth of Armenian composer Alexander Arutjunjan, Make Music Day 2020 and St David's Day.

=== 2021 ===
The 3rd Waltham Forest Cello fest in London was held mainly online, featuring WFCF Cello Concerts, Underground Lunchtime Recitals (in the historic Victoria Line carriage), Cello Weekend, Make Music Day and Cello Academy. In 2021 festival commemorated the 121st anniversary of the birth of Jiří Weil (1900 - 1959), 211th anniversary of the birth of poet Karel Hynek Mácha (1810 - 1836) and the 336th anniversary of the birth of Johann Sebastian Bach. The WFCF 2021 featured cellists and young promising cello talents from Belgium, China, the Czech Republic, France, Israel, Italy, the UK and the USA.

== Artists ==
Musicians who have appeared include cellists Anna Brikciusová, František Brikcius, Yiqi Chen, Mira Kardan, Stijn Kuppens, Anna Shuttleworth (1927-2021), Duo Brikcius and George Wolfe-McGuire. Together with cellist, Cello Museum founder and curator Brenda Neece, cellist, researcher and guest curator Erica Lessie, conductor and composer Peter Askim, percussionist Brecht Claesen, violinist and philosopher Hugh Desmond, organist and composer Irena Kosíková, violinist and conductor Jan Talich, Talich Chamber Orchestra, soprano Nofar Yacobi and narrator Jan Židlický.

== Venues ==
Concerts were held in The London Borough of Waltham Forest

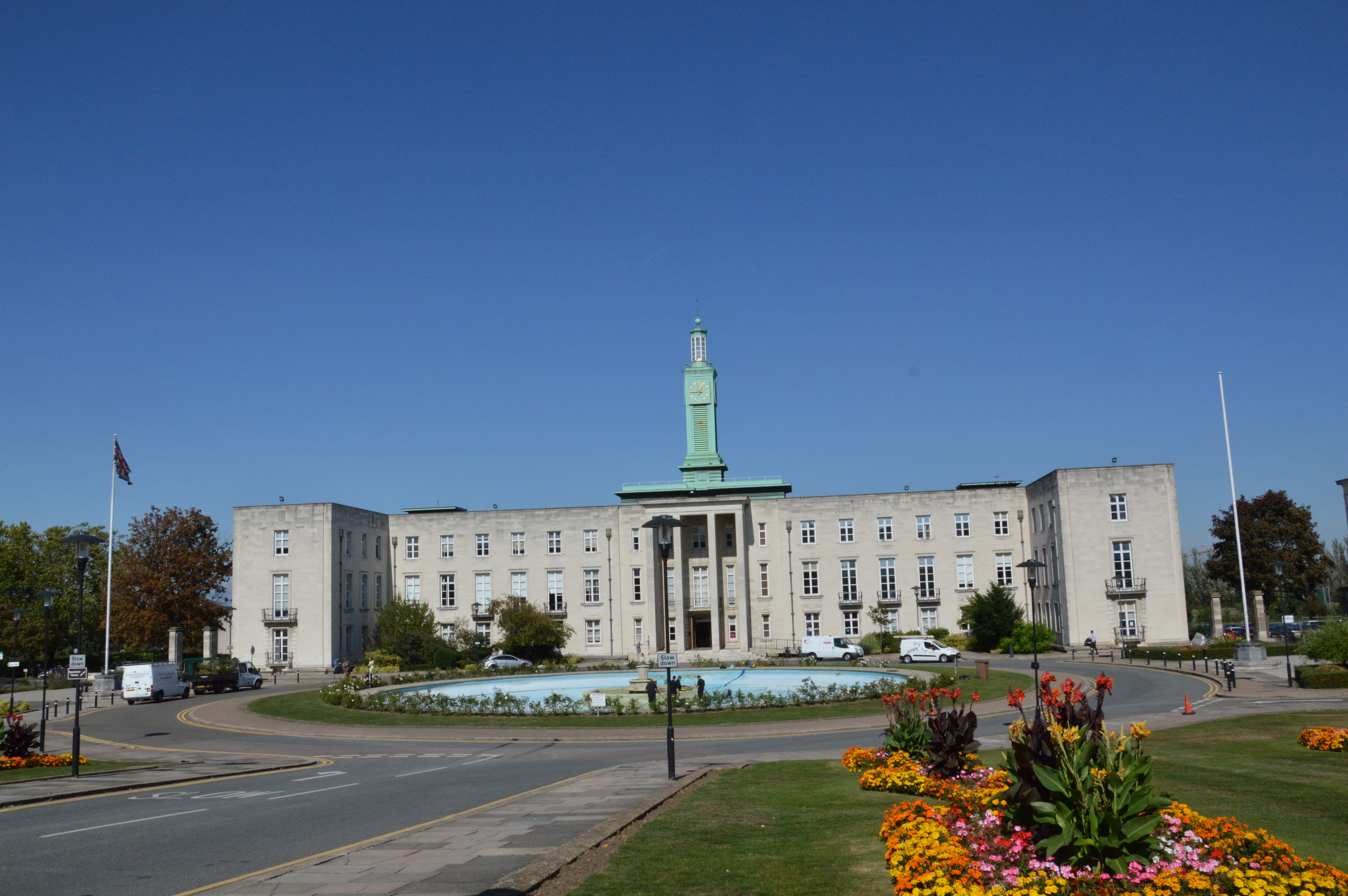
Waltham Forest Town Hall

- the Engine House - Walthamstow Wetlands
- historic Victoria Line Carriage - Walthamstow Pumphouse Museum
- One Hoe Street in Walthamstow
- Church of St John the Baptist in Leytonstone
- Church of St Michael and All Angels in Walthamstow
- the Parish Church of Ss Peter and Paul in Chingford
- and online.
