= Wallenstein (Weinberger) =

Opera by Jaromir Weinberger

Valdštejn is a Czech-language opera in six scenes by Jaromir Weinberger to a libretto by Miloš Kareš after Friedrich Schiller's Wallensteins Lager. The libretto was translated back into German by Max Brod for 1937 performance in Vienna. The opera was performed in Vienna at the new Modernes Theater on the Schwarzenbergplatz, a year before the Anschluss and the composer's escape to America.

== Recordings ==
- Wallenstein Roman Trekel, Dagmar Schellenberger, Martina Welschenbach, Ralf Lukas, Daniel Kirch, ORF Symphonie Orchester, Cornelius Meister 2012 CPO 2017
