= Under the Spreading Chestnut Tree =

Under the Spreading Chestnut Tree is a set of variations, with fugue, for orchestra composed in 1939 by Jaromír Weinberger. It premiered under the direction of Sir John Barbirolli in New York City on October 12, 1939. The work is based on an English popular song of the period, which Weinberger is said to have mistaken for a folk song, and opens with the theme presented without preliminaries. Seven variations follow:

- Her Majesty's Virginal
- The Madrigalists
- The Dark Lady
- The Highlanders
- Pastorale
- Mr. Weller, Senior, Discusses Widows With His Son, Samuel Weller, Esquire
- Sarabande

The fugue, which ends the work, has an eight-bar subject which finally joins contrapuntally with the original theme of the piece.

There are contemporary recordings of the work by The Cleveland Symphony Orchestra under Artur Rodzinski on Columbia (CBS) and by the London Philharmonic Orchestra under Constant Lambert (HMV, issued in the USA by Victor).

== Notes and references ==
- David Ewen, Encyclopedia of Concert Music. New York; Hill and Wang, 1959.
- Anne G. Gilchrist, "'Under the Spreading Chestnut Tree': The Adventures of a Tune." The Musical Times, Vol. 81 (March 1940), pp. 112–113.
