= Jaromír Weinberger =

Czechoslovak-American composer (1896–1967)

Jaromir Weinberger in 1960

Jaromír Weinberger (8 January 1896 – August 8, 1967) was a Bohemian-born Jewish subject of the Austrian Empire, who became a naturalized American composer.

== Biography ==
Weinberger was born in Prague, Austria-Hungary, into a family of Jewish origin. He heard Czech folksongs from time spent at his grandparents' farm as a youth. He started playing the piano aged five, and composing and conducting aged ten. He began musical studies with Jaroslav Křička, and later teachers included Václav Talich and Rudolf Karel. He became a student at the Prague Conservatory at age 14, as a second-year student, where he studied composition with Vítězslav Novák and Karel Hoffmeister. Later, at Leipzig, he studied with Max Reger, who influenced Weinberger on the use of counterpoint. In September 1922, Weinberger moved to the United States where he took up a position as an instructor at Cornell University. Between 1922 and 1926 he was professor of composition at the Ithaca Conservatory (now the music school of Ithaca College), New York.

When he returned to Czechoslovakia he was appointed director of the National Theater in Bratislava, and later received appointments in Eger, Hungary, and Prague. In 1926 Weinberger completed Schwanda the Bagpiper (Švanda Dudák), which became highly successful, with thousands of performances in hundreds of theatres including the Metropolitan Opera in New York City. His operetta Frühlingsstürme was first performed at the Theatre in Admiralspalast in Berlin on January 19, 1933, with Jarmila Novotná and Richard Tauber in the leading roles. Mary Losseff took over from Novotná in February, but the show was closed down by the Nazi government in March. His subsequent European works include the Passacaglia for orchestra and organ, Six Bohemian Dances for violin and piano, the opera The Outcasts of Poker Flat and a grand oratorio Christmas, though none of them matched the success of Schwanda the Bagpiper.

In 1939, after extensive travels to the United States, Bratislava and Vienna, he left Czechoslovakia to escape the Nazis and settled in New York state, teaching there and in Ohio. He wrote a number of works on commission from American orchestras. He became an American citizen in 1948.

In January 1949, Weinberger moved to St. Petersburg, Florida. In later life, he developed cancer of the brain. This, together with money worries and the neglect of his music, prompted him to take a lethal sedative overdose in August 1967. His wife, Jane Lemberger Weinberger (also known as Hansi), died on July 31, 1968.

In 2004 Czech pianist Tomáš Víšek and cellist František Brikcius organized a tour celebrating Weinberger's work.

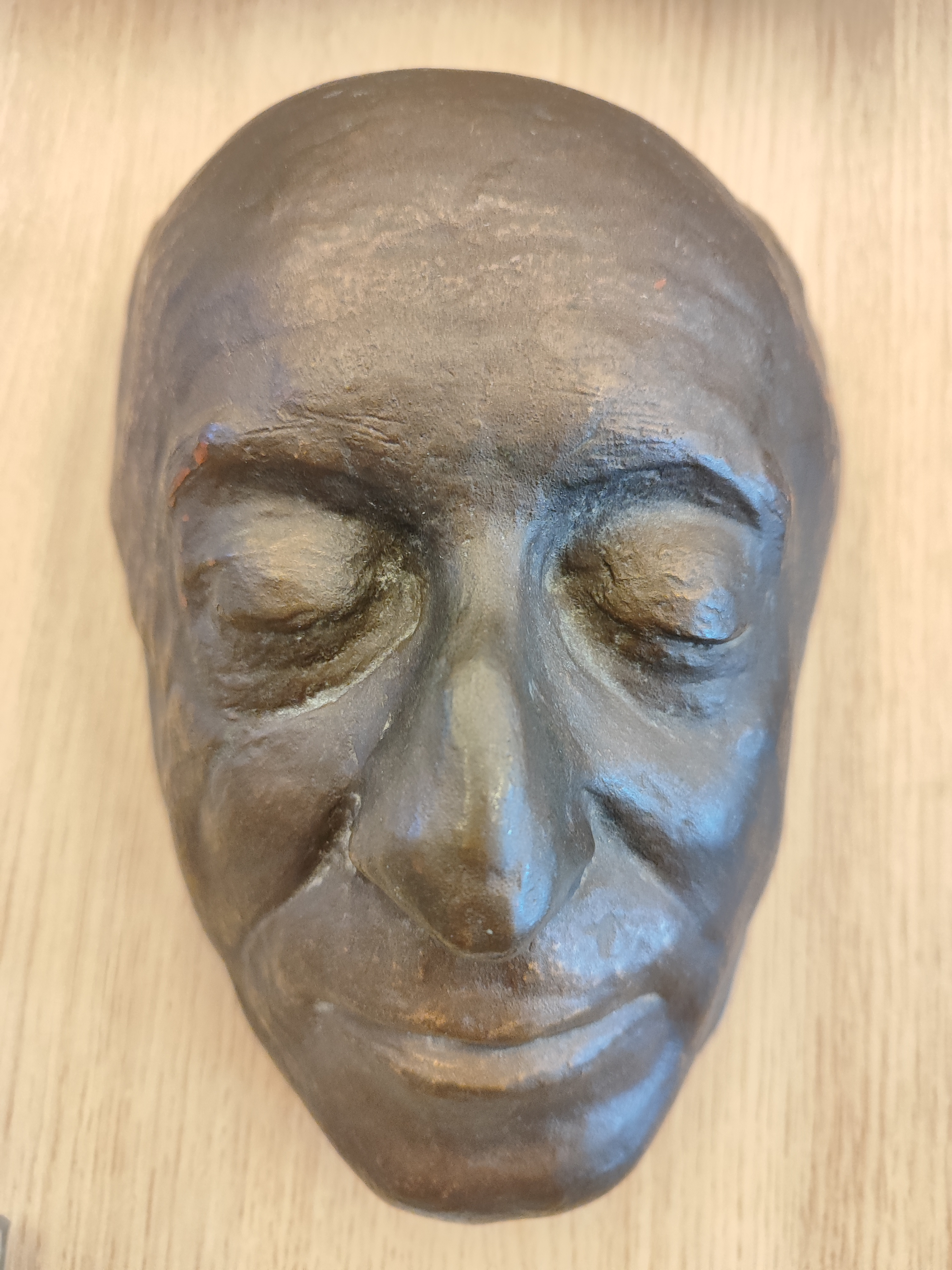
Weinberger's death mask in the National Library of Israel

== Major works ==
Weinberger composed over 100 works, including operas, operettas, choral works, and works for orchestra. Until recently, the only one which remained even on the fringe of the repertoire was the opera Schwanda the Bagpiper (Švanda dudák), a worldwide success after its première in 1927. The opera is still performed occasionally, and the Polka and Fugue from it is often heard in a concert version. The artists of the Walt Disney studio considered making it into a segment for Fantasia 2000, but instead chose Shostakovich's Piano Concerto No. 2 in F major, in the form of Hans Christian Andersen's "The Steadfast Tin Soldier". Recent revivals of Frühlingsstürme (2019, Berlin Komische Oper and DVD/Blu-ray) and Wallenstein (2012, Wiener Konzerthaus and CD) indicate a renewed interest in his distinctive work.

Weinberger used a varied musical language. His studies in Prague and Leipzig stressed formal control and contrapuntal mastery; following the example of his teachers, Křička, Novák and Reger, Weinberger's works exhibit control, but are also playful. This combination received both praise and criticism.

== List of works ==
Opera and operetta

- Švanda dudák (Schwanda the Bagpiper), Opera in 2 acts (1926); libretto by Miloš Kareš after Josef Kajetán Tyl
- Milovaný hlas (The Beloved Voice; Die Geliebte Stimme), Opera in 3 acts (1930); libretto by the composer after the 1928 novel by Robert Michel
- Lidé z Pokerflatu (The Outcasts of Poker Flat), Opera (1932); libretto by Miloš Kareš after the 1869 short story by Bret Harte
- Jarní bouře (Spring Storms; Frühlingsstürme), Operetta in 3 acts (1933); libretto by Gustav Beer
- Na růžích ustláno (A Bed of Roses), Operetta (1933); libretto by Bohumír Polách and Jiří Žalman
- Apropó, co dělá Andula? (By the Way, What Is Andula Doing?), Operetta (1934); libretto by Bohumír Polách and Jiří Žalman
- Císař pán na třešních (The Emperor Lord of Cherries), Operetta (1936); libretto by Bohumír Polách and Jiří Žalman
- Valdštejn (Wallenstein), Musical Tragedy (Opera) in 6 scenes (1937); libretto by Miloš Kareš after Friedrich Schiller; German translation by Max Brod

Stage

- Únos Evelynion (The Abduction of Evelyne; Die Entführung der Evelyne), Pantomime in 1 act (1915); libretto by František Langer
- Kocourkov (Schilda), Puppet Show (1926); libretto by František Smažík
- Saratoga, Ballet (1941); libretto by the composer

Orchestral

- Lustspiel (Veseloherní ouvertura), Overture (1914); with popular song "Pepíku, Pepíku" as the main theme
- Three pieces for small orchestra (Tři kusy pro malý orchestr) (1916)
- Don Quijote (1918)
- Scherzo giocoso (1920)
- Kocourkov (1923–1924)
- Overture to a Marionette Play (Puppenspiel Ouverture; Předehra k loutkové hře) (1924)
- Polka and Fugue (Polka a fuga z opery Švanda dudák) from the opera Schwanda the Bagpiper (1926, published 1928)
- Furiant (Furiant z opery Švanda dudák) from the opera Schwanda the Bagpiper (1926, published 1931)
- White Mountain Ouverture (Předehra k Bílé hoře) (piano arrangement 1926)
- Dance rondo (Taneční rondo, 1927)
- Vánoce (Christmas; Weihnachten) for orchestra and organ (1929)
- Neckerei for chamber orchestra (1929); also for piano
- 6 Czech Songs and Dances (České písně a tance) (1929); also for violin and piano
- Overture to a Chivalrous Play (Ouverture zum einen ritterlichen Spiel; Předehra k rytířské komedii) (1931)
- Passacaglia for orchestra and organ (UE 1932)
- Chant hébraïque (Canto ebraico; Neima Ivrit; Hebrejský zpěv) (piano reduction 1936)
- Valdštejn (Wallenstein), Suite from the opera (1937)
- Under the Spreading Chestnut Tree (Pod košatým kaštanem), Variations and Fugue on an Old English Tune (1939, revised 1941)
- Legend of Sleepy Hollow, 4 Movements from Washington Irving's Sketch Book (1940)
- Song of the High Seas for chamber orchestra and organ (1940)
- Prelude and Fugue on a Southern Folktune (1940); also known as Prelude and Fugue on "Dixie"
- A Bird's Opera, Symphonic Suite (1940)
- Česká rapsódie (Czech Rhapsody) (1941)
- Lincolnova symfonie (The Lincoln Symphony) (1941)
- Préludes Réligieux et Profanes (1952); composed in 8 parts, part 4 is titled Hymne an St. Wenzeslaus
- Aus Tirol, Folkdance and Fugue (1959)
- A Waltz Overture (1960)

Concert band

- Homage to the Pioneers, Triumphant March (1940)
- Mississippi Rhapsody (1940)
- Prelude to the Festival, Concert March (1941)
- Afternoon in the Village (1951)

Concertante

- The Devil on the Belfry for violin and orchestra
- Concerto for Timpani with 4 trumpets and 4 trombones (or 4 trumpets, 3 trombones and tuba) (1939)
- Concerto for alto saxophone and orchestra (1940)
- The Raven for cello, bass clarinet, harp and string orchestra (published 1942)

Chamber music

- String Quartet
- Colloque sentimental, Prelude after the Poem by Paul Verlaine for violin and piano (1920)
- Une cantilène jalouse (Žárlivá kantiléna) for violin and piano (1920)
- 3 Pieces (Tři skladby) for violin and piano (1924)

1. Banjos
2. Cowboy's Christmas (Cowboyovy Vánoce)
3. To Nelly Gray (Na Nelly Gray)

- 6 Czech Songs and Dances (České písně a tance) violin and piano (1929); also for orchestra
- 10 Characteristic Solos for snare drum with piano (1939–1941)
- Sonatina for bassoon and piano (1940)
- Sonatina for clarinet and piano (1940)
- Sonatina for flute and piano (1940)
- Sonatina for oboe and piano (1940)
- Der Rabe for cello and piano

Organ

- Bible Poems (1939)
- Sonata (1941)
- 6 Religious Preludes (1946)
- Meditations, 3 Preludes (1953)
- Dedications, 5 Preludes (1954)

Piano

- Sonatina (1908)
- Sonata, Op.4 (1915)
- Étude in G major on a Polish Chorale "Z dymem pożarów" (1924; included in the 1942 collaborative album Homage to Paderewski)
- Rytiny (Engravings; Gravures), 5 Preludes and Fugues (UE 1924)
- Drei Klavierstücke (Tři klavírní kusy) (1924)
- Spinett-Sonate (Spinet Sonata) (UE 1925)
- Neckerei (1929); also for orchestra
- Dupák, Folk Tune (1941)
- Five-Eighths, Etude (1941)

Vocal

- Hatikvah for voice and piano (1919)
- Písně s průvodem klavíru (Songs with Piano Accompaniment) for low voice and piano (1924)

1. Má první láska byla Olympia (My First Beloved Was Olympia); words by Miloš Kareš
2. Rozhovor (Conversation); words by Miloš Kareš
3. Námořnická; words by the composer

- Psalm 150 for high voice and organ (1940); Biblical text
- The Way to Emmaus for high voice and organ (1940); Biblical text
- Ecclesiastes, Cantata for soprano, baritone, mixed chorus, organ and bells (1946), premiered May 13, 1947 by the John Harms Chorus in New York's Town Hall.
- Of Divine Work, Anthem for mixed chorus (1946); Biblical text from Ecclesiastes
- Five Songs from Des Knaben Wunderhorn for soprano and piano (1962)
- Ave, Rhapsody for chorus and orchestra (1962)
- Tři písně (3 Songs) for children's chorus and piano
- Volnost for 4 voices; words by Josef Václav Sládek
- Dvě písně (2 Songs) for voice and piano

1. Pan Vrchní; words by Pavel Maternov
2. U Vrátek; words by Josef Václav Sládek
