= Ivan Sviták =

Czech politician, poet, philosopher (1925–1994)

- Born: 10 October 1925; Hranice, Czechoslovakia
- Died: 20 October 1994 (aged 69); Prague, Czech Republic

Philosophical work
- Era: 20th-century philosophy
- Region: Western Philosophers
- School: Marxism, Marxist humanism
- Main interests: Social philosophy, aesthetics, politics

Ivan Sviták (10 October 1925 – 20 October 1994) was a Czech philosopher, critic, and poet who ranked among Europe's most prominent proponents of Marxist humanism.

== Career ==
In a vast oeuvre of essays, Sviták addressed questions of democracy and socialism, of art in bureaucratic and consumer societies, and of the "unbearable burden" of political catastrophe in Czech history. In addition, Sviták wrote an extensive body of fiction and poetry, in which he "sought a unity of philosophy, literature, and politics, a unity of engagement, wisdom, and poetry." In this, Sviták consciously followed in the footsteps of the surrealist movement that he admired and critically defended on numerous occasions. These essays often self-published by Svitak were collected by Joseph Grim Feinberg and published in book form as “The Windmills of Humanity” by Charles H. Kerr Publishing Company in Chicago.

In the 1960s, Sviták was one of Czechoslovakia's most vocal advocates of democratic socialism (a distinction he shared with Karel Kosík, Czechoslovakia's other prominent Marxist humanist philosopher). After the Warsaw Pact invasion of Czechoslovakia in August 1968, Sviták was stripped of his citizenship and sentenced to a lengthy jail term. Instead of serving the jail term, he chose to emigrate, first to New York City and in 1970 to Chico, California, where he was offered an academic position. Sviták worked at Cal State Chico until 1990, when he returned to Czechoslovakia after the end of Communist Party rule. In the early 1990s Sviták remained a staunch proponent of democratic socialism, turning his critical pen to the new, post-Communist regime. He died in Prague in 1994.

== Selected publications in English ==
- Man and his World: A Marxian View, New York: Dell Pub. Co., 1970 (translation of Lidský smysl kultury, including a slightly different selection of essays).
- The Czechoslovak Experiment, 1968–1969, New York, Columbia U. Press, 1971.
- “Illusions of Czech Socialist Democracy” Telos, 22 (Winter 1974–75). New York: Telos Press.
- The Unbearable Burden of History: The Sovietization of Czechoslovakia, Academia, 1990.
- The Windmills of Humanity, edited and introduced by Joseph Grim Feinberg, Chicago: Charles H Kerr, 2014.

== Selected publications in Czech ==
- Lidský smysl kultury : eseje ("The Human Meaning of Culture," translated as "Man and His World"), Prague 1968
- Dialektika moci ("The Dialectic of Power"), Cologne, 1973
- Děvčátko s červenou mašlí : povídky a pohádky ("The Girl with the Red Ribbon: Stories and Fairy Tales"), Zürich, 1975
- Nevědecká antropologie : dialectica modo bohemico demonstrata ("Unscientific Anthropology"), Chico, California, 1984
- Národ na křižovatce : dialektika dějin ("The Nation at a Crossroads: The Dialectic of History"), Prague, 1989
- Budoucnost bez komunismu ("The Future without Communism"), Prague, 1990
- Kulatý čtverec : dialektika demokratizace : úvahy a statě, članky z let 1968-1969 ("Squaring the Circle: The Dialectic of Democratization: Reflections and Articles from 1968-1969"), Prague, 1990
- Ztracené iluze : výroční zpráva o sametové revoluci ("Lost Illusions: An Anniversary Message about the Velvet Revolution"), Prague, 1990
- Cesta odnikud nikam ("The Road from Nowhere to Nowhere"), Prague, 1991
- Devět životů : konkrétní dialektika ("Nine Lives: Concrete Dialectics"), Prague, 1992
