= Jenna Roberts =

Australian ballet dancer

Jenna Roberts is a retired Australian ballet dancer, formerly a principal dancer with Birmingham Royal Ballet (BRB)

== Biography ==
Roberts was born in Newcastle, New South Wales, and trained at the Marie Walton-Mahon Dance Academy in Newcastle, Australia, and the Royal Ballet Upper School. Joining Birmingham Royal Ballet in 2003, she quickly rose through the company. In 2006 she starred as Juliet for the "Ballet Hoo!" project, a collaboration between BRB, Channel 4, the charity Youth at Risk and local authorities. She suffered a setback after a severe injury in 2007, returning to achieve a promotion to company principal at the end of the 2011–12 season. Roberts has been acclaimed as a masterful Balanchine interpreter, credited for combining ethereal elegance with outstanding stamina to craft leading roles. After her younger sister Callie Roberts joined the company the two siblings performed together in works including Cinderella.

Roberts has recently created roles in a number of short ballets, working with the contemporary American choreographer Jessica Lang in Lyric Pieces, and dancing as the Fairy in Michael Corder's Le Baiser de la fée. In 2014 The Observer reported that an "incandescent Jenna Roberts steals the show" in Alexander Whitley's new ballet Kin.

Having retired from dancing, she now teaches Pilates, and she and husband Joseph Caley relocated to Australia in 2022, where Caley has become a principal artist with The Australian Ballet

== General repertory ==
Ballet	Role	Choreographer
Agon	Principal couple	George Balanchine
Allegri diversi		David Bintley
Apollo	Terpsichore	George Balanchine
Beauty and the Beast	Belle	David Bintley
Checkmate		Ninette de Valois
Cinderella	Summer	David Bintley
Concerto pas de deux		Kenneth MacMillan
Coppélia	Swanilda's Friends and Prayer	Peter Wright
The Dance House		David Bintley
Dante Sonata		Frederick Ashton
Daphnis and Chloë	Chloë	Frederick Ashton
Dumbarton Oaks		Michael Kopisnki
E=mc²	Mass	David Bintley
Elite Syncopations	Bethena Concert Waltz	Kenneth MacMillan
La Fille mal gardée	Lise's Friends	Frederick Ashton
Five Tangos		Hans van Manen
The Four Seasons		Oliver Hindle
Giselle	Harvest pas de deux	David Bintley
Hobson's Choice	Salvation Army	David Bintley
Kin		Alexander Whitley
The Lady and the Fool		John Cranko
Lyric Pieces		Jessica Lang
Monotones II		Frederick Ashton
The Nutcracker	Sugar Plum Fairy, Snow Fairy	Peter Wright
The Nutcracker Sweeties	Chinoiserie	David Bintley
The Orpheus Suite		David Bintley
The Rite of Spring		Millicent Hodson and Kenneth Archer (reconstruction)
Romeo and Juliet	Juliet	Kenneth MacMillan
Scènes de ballet		Frederick Ashton
The Shakespeare Suite	Juliet	David Bintley
Solitaire	Girl	Kenneth MacMillan
The Sleeping Beauty	Princess Aurora	Peter Wright
The Sons of Horus		David Bintley
Symphonic Variations		Frederick Ashton
Symphony in Three Movements		George Balanchine
The Two Pigeons		Frederick Ashton
Western Symphony	First movement	George Balanchine
