= Karel Kosík =

Czech philosopher, literary theorist and university educator (1926-2003)

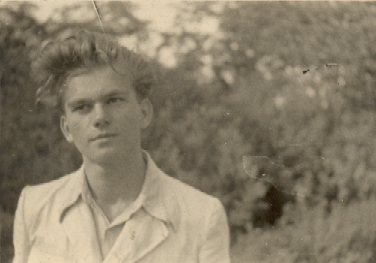
- Born: 26 June 1926; Prague, Czechoslovakia
- Died: 21 February 2003 (aged 76); Prague, Czech Republic

Education
- Education: Charles University in Prague (PhD, 1950); Leningrad University (no degree); Moscow State University (no degree)
- Academic advisor: Jan Patočka

Philosophical work
- Era: 20th-century philosophy
- Region: Western philosophy
- School: Continental philosophy Marxist humanism
- Institutions: Charles University in Prague
- Main interests: Social philosophy, politics, ethics, aesthetics
- Notable ideas: Dialectics of the concrete

Karel Kosík (Czech: [ˈkosiːk]; 26 June 1926 – 21 February 2003) was a Czech Marxist philosopher. In his most famous philosophical work, Dialectics of the Concrete (1963), Kosík presents an original reinterpretation of the ideas of Karl Marx in light of Martin Heidegger's phenomenology. His later essays can be called a sharp critique of the modern society from a leftist but not strictly Marxist position.

== Biography ==
Karel Kosík was born on 26 June 1926 in Prague.

From 1 September 1943 until his arrest by the Gestapo on 17 November 1944, he was a member of an illegal anti-Nazi communist resistance group Předvoj (The Vanguard) and a chief editor of an illegal journal Boj mladých (The Fight of Youth). After his seizure Kosík was accused of high treason and repeatedly questioned. From 30 January to 5 May 1945 he was imprisoned in Theresienstadt concentration camp.

From 1945 to 1947, Kosík studied philosophy and sociology at the Charles University in Prague. In the years 1947–1949, he also attended courses at the Leningrad University and the Moscow State University in the USSR. He graduated in 1950 in Prague at the Charles University. In this part of his life he met his future wife Růžena Grebeníčková (later laureate of Herder Prize), from this marriage came three children (Antonín Kosík, Irena Kosíková and Štěpán Kosík). In 1963, he published his magnum opus, Dialectics of the Concrete, a re-working of Marxian categories in terms of humanist phenomenology, which earned him an international reputation as a leading philosopher of humanist Marxism. During the "Prague Spring" of 1968, Kosík became a leading voice for democratic socialism (a distinction he shared with other prominent Marxist humanists like Ivan Sviták and Robert Kalivoda). This political engagement led to Kosík's dismissal from university work in 1970, after the period of democratization had ended. He remained unemployed until 1990, when he returned to public intellectual life as one of Central Europe's few prominent leftist social critics.

== Legacy ==
Spanish-Mexican Marxist Adolfo Sánchez Vázquez wrote in the prologue for the Mexican edition that he considered Dialectics of the Concrete to be "one of the richest in thinking, [one of the] most charming and attractive works as we know it in Marxist literature". French-Brazilian Marxist Michael Löwy and Argentine historian Horacio Tarcus wrote for Le Monde:

Karel Kosik is not only one of the most important philosophers of the second half of the twentieth century, but also one of those who best embodied the spirit of resistance of critical thinking. He is also one of the few who have fought in succession the three major forces of oppression of modern history: Fascism in the 1940s, the Stalinist bureaucratic regime in 1956, and the dictatorship of market since 1989. At a time when so many thinkers have abdicated their autonomy to serve the powerful of this world, or turned away from the historical reality to engage in academic language games, Kosik appears as a standing man who refuses to bow down, and who does not hesitate to think, against the current, [about] the major problems of the time.

The Institute of Philosophy of the Czech Academy of Sciences (CAS) held a conference on Kosík's œuvre between 4 and 6 June 2014 in Prague. Organized by Ivan Landa, Jan Mervart, and Joseph Grim Feinberg, it had people from around the world discussing the impact of Kosík's thought on "issues that are still relevant today". Landa and Mervat are working on a "critical edition" of "everything Kosík had ever published or written for print during his lifetime", including books, essays and short notes. To be published in Czech, it is planned to have seven volumes, out of which three are complete as of September 2016: one of essays on political activities and on the Czech radical democrats of 1848; a volume of essays on culture and politics from the period of 1956–1967; and a re-edition of Dialectics of the Concrete and philosophical essays the same time period. Also, with funding from the CAS Landa and Mervart are translating texts to be published in "a comprehensive English volume" on Kosík'.

== Works ==
Books

- Čeští radikální demokraté, Praha 1958
- Dialektika konkrétního, Praha 1963, 1965, 1966
  - English translation: Dialectics of the Concrete, Dordrecht 1976
- Moral und Gesellschaft, Frankfurt am Main 1968, 1970
- La nostra crisi attuale, Roma 1969, Barcelona 1971
- Století Markéty Samsové, 1993, 1995
- Jinoch a smrt, Praha 1995
- Předpotopní úvahy, Praha 1997 (In English: Antediluvian Thoughts)
- Poslední eseje, Praha 2004

Articles

- "Dialectic of the Concrete Totality". Telos 2 (Fall 1968). New York: Telos Press.
