= Tomáš Víšek =

Czech pianist

Tomáš Víšek (born 1957) is a Czech pianist.

== Early life ==
Víšek began study of the piano at eight years of age under professor Pavel Svoboda. During the years 1972–1976, he studied at the Prague Conservatory under professor Valentina Kameníková and then later under professor Zdeněk Kozina. During the years 1976–1984, he studied at Prague Academy of Performing Arts, at first under professor Josef Páleníček and then under professor Zdeněk Jílek, with whom he continued post-graduate studies in the years 1990–1993. In 2017, he finished his Ph.D. studies at the Pedagogical Faculty of the Charles University in Prague (dissertation "Attraction and Problems of the Antonín Dvořák´s Piano Works").

== Career ==
During his studies, Víšek became a many-time laureate in domestic competitions including Ústi nad Labem, Hradec Králové and Mariánské Lázně. He gained prizes at many international competitions (see lower). He performed in the Czech Republic, Slovakia, Poland, Egypt, Japan, USA, Hungary, Russia, Bulgaria, Slovenia, Germany, France, Holland, Italy, Finland, Switzerland and Austria. He repeatedly gave performances in the Vienna Musikverein as a soloist in Grieg's Piano Concerto. Radio France arranged a separate recital for him. Visek recorded also for Czech and Polish Radio, Czech television and on CD recordings (his last CDs are "Dvořák Unreleased" and "Franz Liszt and Czech Music"). His piano recital at the Prague International Spring Festival in May 1997 was highly acclaimed, as well as his performances there in 2002, 2003, 2006 and 2014. Other successes include the unique festival "Music of extended duration" on Prague Castle where he played the works of John Cage, the festival "Musica Iudaica" where he performed the work of Jewish composers including Gershwin, Mendelssohn-Bartholdy and E.W. Korngold. In 1997, he performed Gershwin's Rhapsody in Blue several times with orchestra in the Dvorak Hall of Prague Rudolfinum, which he repeated in 1998, and at St. Wenceslas Festival in 2003, Piano Festival of Rudolf Firkušný in 2017, etc.

An interview with Tomáš Víšek in Czech Music described him as, "An explosive type of an artist who is always fully absorbed in the play. It is almost with an obsession and devilish attitude that he enjoys every twist and turn in the plot of the play. With a unique touch, he moves it into convincing levels with deep absorption. He is unveiling various secrets of the manuscript and he has proved to keep the audience in suspense for a long duration." (Hudební rozhledy, 2/98). In 2007 Víšek and cellist František Brikcius organized the "Weinberger Tour", celebrating the music of Czech composer Jaromír Weinberger, in 1999 created (with other 4 pianists) the special concert programme "Classic Piano Jike(r)s".

== Awards and honors ==
In international events, Víšek acquired awards in the Chopin competition in Warsaw, 1975 (Janina Nawrocka Special Prize) and the Smetana competition in Hradec Kralove, 1978 (2nd prize plus an award for Smetana interpretation). During the nineties, he followed this success by winning the Second Prize in international competitions in Vienna (1992), the 2nd Prize + Bach-Award at Sicilian Ragusa (1994), 5th Prize in the "Concours Milosz Magin" in Paris, 1995. In the 21st century, he gained prizes at the "Concours Musical de France" in Paris, 2013 (1st Prize + CMF-Prix), "Music Without Limits" in Druskininkai, 2015 (1st Prize), video-competition "Grand Prize Virtuoso", 2015 (1st Prize) and "International Music Competition for Piano Teachers" in Warsaw, 2016 (1st Prize and again in 2023), video-competition "Golden Classical Music Awards", 2021 (1st Prize, with the performance at the Carnegie Hall), video-competition "Grand Prize Virtuoso", 2022 (1st Prize, with the performance at Concertgebouw), the American competition "Global Music Awards", 2024 (Silver Medal) and the prestigious "World´s Best Musicians Competition", 2024 (1st Prize at the category CD Album).
