= Růžena Grebeníčková =

Czech literary theorist and translator (1925–1997)

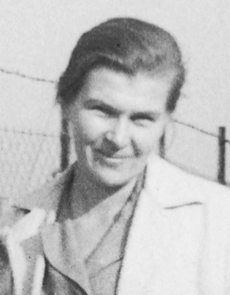
- Born: 1 November 1925; Sušice, Czechoslovakia
- Died: 21 July 1997 (aged 71); Prague, Czech Republic
- Spouse: Karel Kosík
- Children: 3, including Irena Kosíková

Růžena Grebeníčková (1 November 1925 – 21 July 1997) was a leading Czech literary historian and theorist, and translator.

She was married to the philosopher Karel Kosík with whom she had three children, Antonín (1952), Irena and Štěpán.

== Work ==
- Růžena Grebeníčková, List of records
