= Superpowerless =

English singer-songwriter and record producer

- Also known as: Oliver Hindle, Oliver Age 24
- Born: 17 November 1988 (age 37)
- Origin: Leeds, England
- Genres: Pop/rock, electronic rock, electropop, chiptune, Nintendocore
- Years active: 2006–2013
- Label: Pixel Punk
- Members: Oliver Hindle; Callum Whittall; Circuit Ben
- Website: www.superpowerless.co.uk

Superpowerless was music act led by Oliver Hindle from 2006 to around 2013. Superpowerless was best known in chiptune and video game culture for playing chaotic live shows and for embracing a do it yourself ethic, self-producing his recordings and self-distributing them through online social networking channels.

== Accolades ==
Superpowerless was the winner of the 2009 MTV / Vodafone Fast Track competition, As part of the Fast Track prize, Superpowerless re-recorded his winning single "Wasted My Time" with Grammy-Nominated producer and DJ Andy Chatterley and an accompanying video with director Luc Janin (Stereophonics, The Fratellis, Boy Kill Boy and Lethal Bizzle). The resulting music video featured on MTV in 29 countries and YouTube.

== History ==
Oliver Hindle played in multiple bands around the Leeds area during his teen years before starting his solo career in 2006. Upon releasing several free promotional EPs and Albums for download, Superpowerless topped the Myspace UK Music Charts. In 2009 Superpowerless songs were featured on the web-based Guitar Hero clone JamLegend, accumulating over a million plays and topping the charts.

== Releases ==
Superpowerless released his first official single "We Throw Shapes" in May 2011. and also published in IDN Magazine. Following the death of Michael Jackson, Superpowerless released an 8-bit tribute EP called "Moonwalker". The Superpowerless Debut LP, Monsters was released on 17 November 2011. It features 14 original songs and original artwork by Oliver Hindle. The album was entirely self-recorded and self-produced.

None of the Superpowerless recordings have featured in any of the UK mainstream charts.
