= Schwanda the Bagpiper =

Opera by Jaromír Weinberger

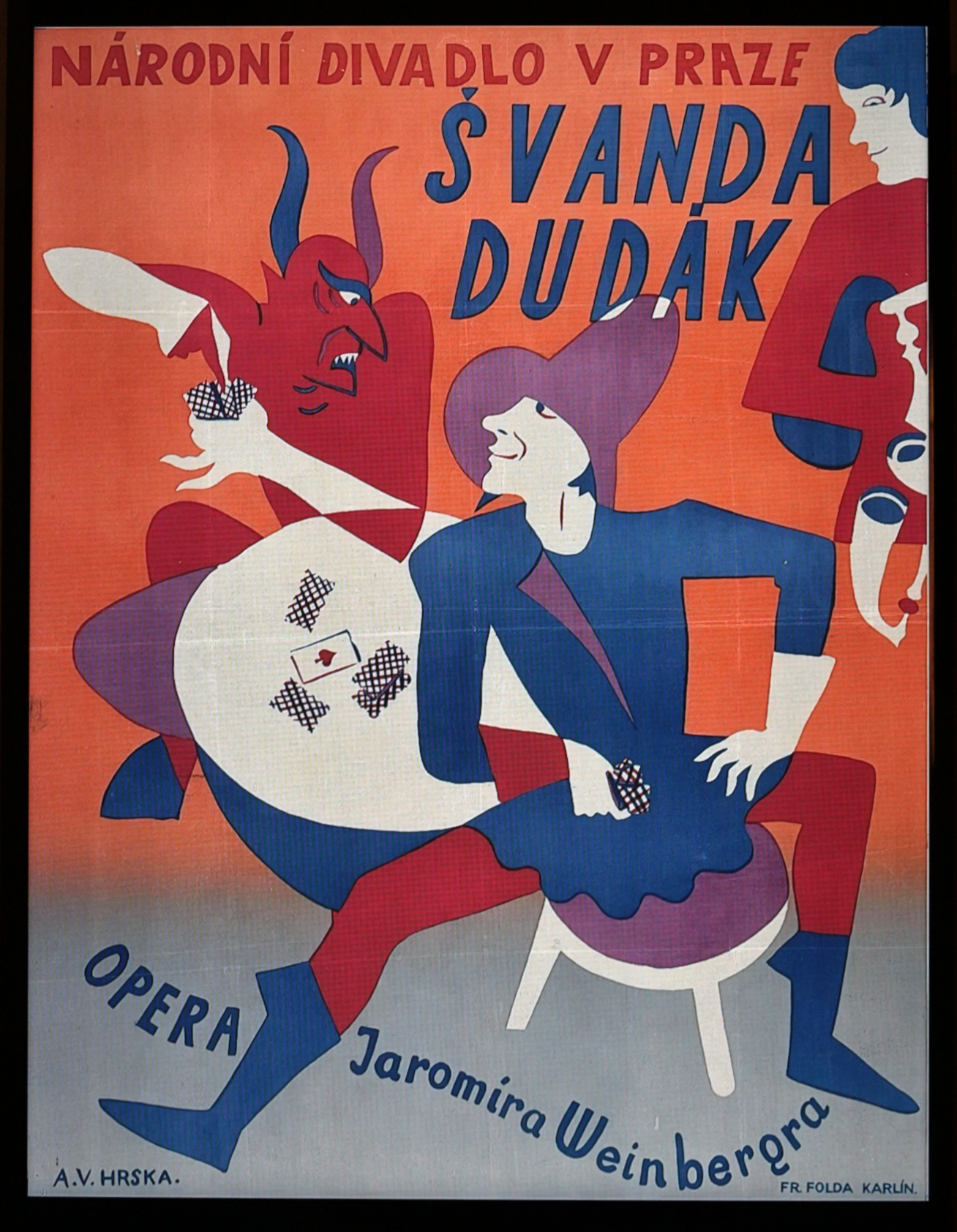
Poster, 1927

Schwanda the Bagpiper (Czech: Švanda dudák), written in 1926, is an opera in two acts and five scenes, with music by Jaromír Weinberger to a Czech libretto by Miloš Kareš, based on the drama Strakonický dudák aneb Hody divých žen (The Bagpiper of Strakonice) by Josef Kajetán Tyl.

== Performance history ==
Its first performance was in Prague at the Czech National Opera on 27 April 1927; and the first German production followed (in the translation by Max Brod as Schwanda der Dudelsackpfeifer), at Breslau on 16 December 1928. After that success, German-language productions proliferated around the world, with over 2000 performances taking place during the next decade. Aside from those in Germany and Austria, these included:

- Ljubljana, 5 October 1929 (in Slovenian translation)
- Riga, 6 December 1930 (in Latvian translation)
- Sofia, 6 November 1931 (in Bulgarian translation)
- Metropolitan Opera, New York City, 7 November 1931 (the American premiere, conducted by Artur Bodanzky, with Friedrich Schorr in the title role)
- Covent Garden, London, 11 May 1934

At the time the opera, with its occasional use of Czech folk material, enjoyed considerable success, with translations into 17 languages. The opera fell from the repertory when the composer's music was banned by the Nazi regimes of Austria and Germany during the late 1930s; and although it is still revived occasionally, orchestral performances of the "Polka and Fugue" drawn from the opera are more regularly heard in concert and on record.

== Roles ==
Roles, voice types, premiere cast
Role	Voice type	Premiere cast, 27 April 1927 Conductor: Helmut Seidelmann
Švanda	baritone	Václav Novák
Dorotka, his wife	soprano	Nada Kejrová
Babinský, a bandit	tenor	Theodor Schütz
The Queen	mezzo-soprano	Ada Nordenová
The Magician	bass	Josef Munclinger
The Devil	bass	Emil Pollert
The Judge	tenor	Antonín Lebeda
The Executioner	tenor	Karel Hruška
A Familiar	tenor	
Captain of the Devil's Guard	baritone	
Two Foresters (Mercenary Soldiers)	tenor and bass	

== Synopsis ==
It has been a week since Švanda and Dorotka married. The robber Babinský takes refuge in their farmhouse, and immediately falls for Dorotka. Babinský quickly convinces Švanda of the tedium of married life, and persuades him to go off on an adventure. They arrive at the Queen's court, where she is under the power of a wicked Magician. The Queen had made a deal with the Magician where she consented to the death of the Prince, her betrothed, in exchange for a heart of ice (and thus no human feeling) and a diamond scepter, symbolic of her power. Švanda plays his bagpipes, which breaks the spell. The Queen then offers herself to Švanda in marriage. Švanda accepts, kissing her, but then Dorotka appears, which angers the Queen. The Queen, her heart now again of ice, has Švanda and Dorotka imprisoned and Švanda condemned to death.

Babinský helps save Švanda by replacing the executioner's axe with a broom. Švanda plays his bagpipes again, enchanting the crowd gathered for the execution, and escapes with Dorotka. Dorotka herself is now angry at Švanda and questions his fidelity. Švanda retorts that if he ever kissed the Queen, may he go to Hell. Forgetting that he did kiss the Queen, Švanda immediately drops through the earth into Hell. Babinský then tells Dorotka that he loves her, but she makes him promise to rescue Švanda.

In Hell, the Devil asks Švanda to play for him, since he has nothing to do, because no one will play cards with the Devil because he always cheats. Švanda at first refuses, but then Babinský appears and challenges the Devil to a card game. By cheating even more than the Devil, Babinský wins the game and rescues Švanda. (It is at this point that Švanda plays the music that forms the famous Fugue.) At the end, Švanda and Dorotka are reconciled, and Babinský sorrowfully leaves, in search of new adventures.

== Recordings ==
Complete opera

- Schwanda, der Dudelsackpfeifer (sung in German); Karl Schmitt-Walter, Betina Bruckner, Karl Friedrich, Christa Ludwig, Josef Lindlar, Eugen Willmann, Oskar Witasscheck, Wolf Heide, Willy Hofmann, Hans Kasperzyk, Herbert Hess, August Heimpel; Choir and Symphony Orchestra of the Hessian Radio; Winfried Zillig, conductor; recorded at Frankfurt, 1948; Walhall Eternity Series, 2 CDs ADD WLCD 0377, remastered edition 2013
- Schwanda, der Dudelsackpfeifer (sung in German); Hermann Prey, Lucia Popp, Siegfried Jerusalem, Gwendolyn Killebrew, Alexander Malta, Siegmund Nimsgern, Karl Kreile, Albert Gassner, Heinrich Weber, Georg Baumgartner, Anton Rosner, Peter Lika; Bavarian Radio Chorus; Munich Radio Orchestra; Heinz Wallberg, conductor (1981); CBS M2K79344
- Švanda dudák (sung in Czech); Matjaz Robavs, Tatiana Monogarova, Ivan Choupenitch, Larisa Kostyuk, Alexander Teliga, Nicholas Sharratt, Pavel Kozel, Alexander Teliga, Sean Ruane, Pavel Kozel, Vicenç Esteve, Richard Weigold; Wexford Festival Opera Chorus; National Philharmonic Orchestra of Belarus; Julian Reynolds, conductor (2003); Naxos 8.660146-7

Polka and Fugue

- Polka and Fugue, Chicago Symphony Orchestra; Fritz Reiner, conductor; RCA Living Stereo 82876-663762 (SACD)
- Polka and Fugue, Pro Arte Orchestra; Sir Charles Mackerras, conductor; EMI Encore 5099923572027
- Polka and Fugue, Dallas Wind Symphony; Frederick Fennell, conductor; Reference Recordings B00000159M
- Polka, Philharmonia Orchestra; Herbert von Karajan, conductor; EMI The Karajan Collection 0724347690020
- Polka and Fugue, Philadelphia Orchestra; Eugene Ormandy, conductor; Sony Essential Classics
