= Anna Shuttleworth =

British musician (1927–2021)

Anna Shuttleworth (2 May 1927 – 2 March 2021) was a British cellist. She studied cello with Ivor James and Harvey Phillips at the Royal College of Music and later became a professor at the same college. Her pupils include Alexander Baillie, Martin Johnson, Natalie Clein, František Brikcius, and Kathy Hampson (née Jewell).

== Early life ==
On 2 May 1927, Shuttleworth was born in Bournemouth. Shuttleworth's father was a retired Indian Civil Service officer and her mother was of Polish-Irish heritage.

== Studies ==
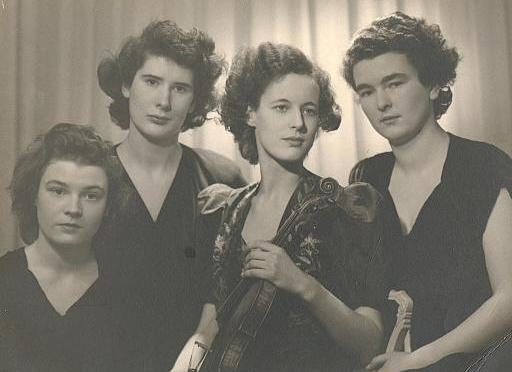
The Vivien Hind Quartet in 1947 - Cynthia is second left

In 1943, Shuttleworth went to study the cello at the Royal College of Music (RCM) as a scholar. There she learned with Ivor James and Harvey Phillips. While at the RCM, Shuttleworth became a founding member of the Vivien Hind String Quartet, an ensemble that she played with for a number of years. Another player in the quartet was Cynthia Midgley (born Freeman, 1925–2021) who played the viola. After leaving the RCM her friend Joan Dickson organised for the cellist Enrico Mainardi to give lessons in London in which Shuttleworth took part. She also continued her studies with Franz Walter in Geneva.

Shortly after leaving college, Shuttleworth was invited to play at the Newbury Festival with the Newbury String Players, both in the orchestra and later as a soloist. This initiated a long friendship with the family of Gerald Finzi and their musical circle, including Ursula and Ralph Vaughan Williams. This period also witnessed a richly varied freelance career, playing in a number of festival orchestras, as a chamber musician and soloist. She was once affectionately referred to as "The Swellest Cellist" by Vaughan Williams.

In 1953, at the recommendation of the composer Herbert Howells, Shuttleworth applied for the Boise scholarship and in 1954 was awarded a substantial sum to further her cello studies. This she used to study with Mainardi in Salzburg and Rome, and with Pablo Casals in Zermatt and Prades.

== Personal life ==
Shuttleworth was married twice. Her first marriage was to Noel Taylor, a fellow cellist, in 1957. Her second marriage was to David Sellen, a biophysics researcher, in 1973. They remained married until her death on 2 March 2021 in Leeds.

== Professional life ==
In the 1960s, Shuttleworth became a member of several ensembles and performed for many BBC broadcasts. In 1964, Novello published 'Learning the cello', which Shuttleworth wrote jointly with Hugo Cole. She had a lesson with Rostropovich who complimented her on her beautiful cello sound and musicianship. This was also the year when she was invited to teach the cello at the Junior Department at the RCM, followed by the appointment to the Senior Department in 1967. In 1968 she was approved as an Associated Board examiner and also bought her very first Renault 4, the car that was to become her habitual transport, travelling around the country.

The 1970s was Shuttleworth's golden period and through the connection with Hilary Finzi, Jacqueline du Pré's sister, she was allowed to play on du Pré's Davidov Stradivarius for two years. She became a cello professor at the RCM and taught many of today's well-known musicians, including Adrian Brendel, Alexander Baillie, Clare Finzi, Elizabeth Wilson and Jonathan del Mar. However, as Shuttleworth felt as though she had neglected her academic career, and partly to better understand David's work at the Leeds University, she took an Open University course 1971-75 and was awarded a BA (Hons) degree in 1975. In 1972 Shuttleworth put Stuart Lowe (a keen amateur cellist) in contact with Sue Jennings (one of Shuttleworth's cello students at the RCM) and later Stuart and Sue married. Later Shuttleworth taught Matthew, Daniel and Tim Lowe at Sue's request. She and Sue developed a longstanding teaching relationship together, and with the Lowe family members and Alexander Baillie, they created "Gathering of the Clans", a long running cello course with teachers such as Baillie and Johannes Goritzki as well as Alexander teachers/cellists Vivien Mackie and Rhuna Martin. Other cellists included Joan Dickson, Amanda Truelove, Sasha Boyarsky, Lowri Blake, Andreas Burzik, Melissa Phelps, Louise Hopkins, and Moray Welsh.

After the 1960s, Shuttleworth performed many successful piano and cello recitals with some of the leading pianists in Britain, including Bernard Roberts, Ian Brown, Martin Roscoe and John Thwaites. After leaving the RCM in the late 1940s Shuttleworth was a member of numerous chamber music ensembles including a string trio with Elisabeth Watson (viola), Georgian String Quartet, Leonardo Trio (first with David Roth, later with Maureen Smith, violin and with Ian Brown, piano), London Harpsichord Ensemble, Glickman Trio and Aulos Ensemble. When in London, she knew Sylvia Cleaver, who in 1964 asked Shuttleworth to become the principal cellist of the Midland Sinfonia Orchestra (later renamed the English Sinfonia). She held this post until she retired from the orchestra in 1996. Apart from this, Shuttleworth worked with many orchestras over the years such as the Alexandra Orchestra (founded by Denys Darlow) which later became the Tilford Bach Orchestra, Chelsea Opera Group, Kalmar Orchestra, Sadler's Wells Opera Orchestra (now English National Opera) and Orchestra d'Amici.

== International career ==
Shuttleworth travelled widely and spent many holidays around the world with a particular fondness for Scandinavia. In the early seventies, at Jacqueline du Pré's suggestion, the Swedish cellist Frans Helmerson stayed at Shuttleworth's house and they became friends. Then while teaching at the Great Missenden Summer course in Berkshire, Shuttleworth met the Swedish musical Frankmar family who brought her over to Sweden for various summer courses. There she met cellists Ludwig Frankmar and Tomas Sterner who came to study with her in London. In 1979, Tomas became her cello student at the RCM and, in 2009, published her memoirs. Tomas and Shuttleworth also helped to organise two string courses in Guernsey in the early 1980s.

In 1985, while on tour with the Associated Board in Malaysia, Shuttleworth met Toya, a Batik artist living in Penang, and his nephew Kia. Shuttleworth helped both of them, firstly by organising exhibitions of Toya's work in England and secondly by sponsoring Kia to study at Leeds University, where he is now on the staff. In 1986 she again worked for the Associated Board, examining in New Zealand.

== Teaching career ==
Shuttleworth's teaching career evolved over the years. From initially teaching at independent schools and later being appointed a professor at the RCM, she eventually took on many teaching positions in England, including Canterbury, Leeds and students from York University, as well as at Leeds Girls High School. She also had many private pupils. In 1994, Shuttleworth's teaching became more widely known when her pupil, Natalie Clein, won both the UK and European Young Musician of the Year competitions. Although this was at a time when Shuttleworth was near retirement, she was now very much a sought-after teacher. Much later, she taught the Czech cellist Frantisek Brikcius, who came to Leeds University as an Erasmus scholar. Anna also taught at Canterbury Christ Church University and spent a great deal of time travelling between her home in Leeds and her home in Tankerton. In her memoirs she notes teaching Max Cheng, Emma Coleman and Sarah Montague in Canterbury.

In retirement, Shuttleworth slowed down but did not stop. She made her final cello and piano duo recitals in 2003 and played the Treble and Bass Viols and sang early music. She taught the cello if requested.

In 2008, Shuttleworth was awarded an Honorary Membership of the Royal College of Music from Prince Charles. This followed a number of years when she supported the RCM and also created a cello prize in her own name.

== Publications ==
Shuttleworth co-wrote a cello method for young cellists aged 10 and upwards, and her memoirs were published in July 2009.

== Recordings ==
Shuttleworth made several recordings with Alfred Deller (counter-tenor). For example, Purcell's Ode for St. Cecilia's Day and Purcell's Te Deum and Jubilate Deo.
