= Nítkovice =

- Municipality
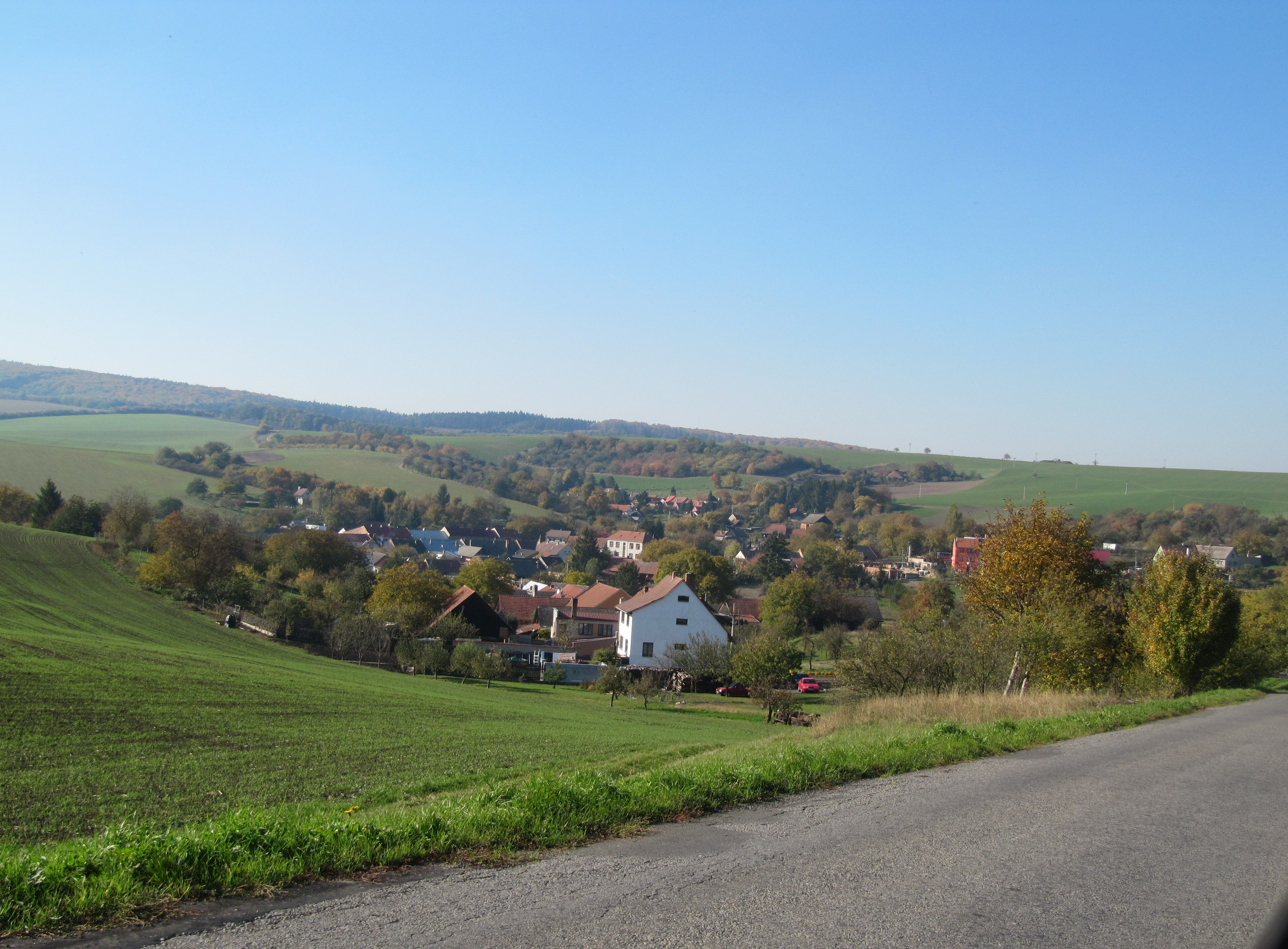
- General view

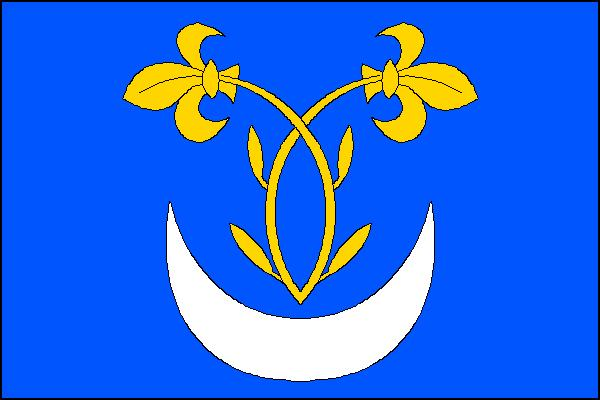
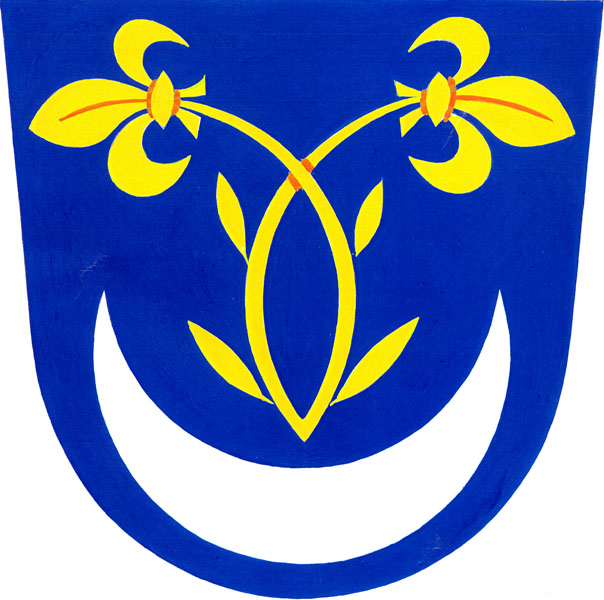
- Flag Coat of arms

- Location in the Czech Republic
- Coordinates: 49°12′13″N 17°9′57″E
- Country: Czech Republic
- Region: Zlín
- District: Kroměříž
- First mentioned: 1349

Area
  - Total: 9.13 km^{2} (3.53 sq mi)
- Elevation: 300 m (980 ft)

Population (2026-01-01)
  - Total: 224
  - Density: 24.5/km^{2} (63.5/sq mi)
- Time zone: UTC+1 (CET)
  - Summer (DST): UTC+2 (CEST)
- Postal code: 768 13
- Website: www.nitkovice.cz

Nítkovice is a municipality and village in Kroměříž District in the Zlín Region of the Czech Republic. It has about 200 inhabitants.

Nítkovice lies approximately 20 kilometres (12 mi) south-west of Kroměříž, 37 km (23 mi) west of Zlín, and 221 km (137 mi) south-east of Prague.

== Demographics ==
Historical population
Year	Pop.	±%
1869	458	—
1880	517	+12.9%
1890	537	+3.9%
1900	535	−0.4%
1910	552	+3.2%
1921	547	−0.9%
1930	556	+1.6%
1950	407	−26.8%
1961	407	+0.0%
1970	345	−15.2%
1980	285	−17.4%
1991	283	−0.7%
2001	283	+0.0%
2011	235	−17.0%
2021	217	−7.7%
Source: Censuses

== Notable people ==
- Josef František Munclinger (1888–1954), opera singer
