= MTV Drumscape =

Arcade drum simulation game

MTV Drumscape (or Drumscape) is an arcade drum simulation made by Devecka Enterprises. First introduced in 1997, Drumscape resembles Karaoke for drums. Production of Drumscape stopped in 2001.

A number of celebrity drummers and musicians are pictured on the Drumscape website either playing the game or posing with its creators.

== Gameplay ==
The player sits in a booth before an array of electronic drum simulation pads. After selecting a song, the player hits the pads with a pair of drumsticks while a time meter counts down. The manufacturers recommend that arcade machines be set to a 2-minute and 15 second play-period costing $1. Unlike other music games, the player's actions are not dictated by a set rhythm displayed onscreen, but rather the player plays as he sees fit. Additionally, Drumscape lacks a scoring system to indicate success or failure of a player. As the player drums, stage lights and crowd cheers are triggered to create a more realistic experience.

== Design ==
Drumscape uses off the shelf components including a DTX drumset, amplifier, a standard computer (running the Drumscape menu software on its OS), a standard audio music player (such as CD system), and a standard VCR (not utilized in the final product). As claimed in its patent, it does not provide any cues for drumming.

== Reception ==
Drumscape lacks a scoring system to indicate success or failure making it comparable to DDR DVD Game. For this reason, compared to drumming games like DrumMania it has seen comparatively lackluster success. While Drumscape claimed to be the only drum simulation game in North America (due to the U.S. patent, which extends into Canada), many arcades have imported DrumMania to much success. This put strong pressure on arcades insisting on treading the more legally safe path.

== Patents ==
Devecka Enterprises has claimed that its patents cover not only drumming games but all music games (including but not limited to Guitar Freaks, Guitar Hero, Rock Band, and Dance Dance Revolution); however because its concept is very basic and prior non-patented MIDI drumsets have been used as training tools and as input, the patent's validity has been called into question. Outside of the United States, Devecka's patents have been successfully challenged due to these claims. Neither Devecka nor MTV, for example, have challenged Konami or other music game companies (such as Harmonix for its Rock Band series or Namco for its Taiko no Tatsujin drumming game).

Within the United States, Devecka Enterprises has attempted to bar the legal licensing of DrumMania, a competitive and similar product that is more in line with traditional arcade games due to its ability to assign a score for player performance. Devecka's claim relies on its holding of the drum simulation game patent in the United States.

Devecka Enterprises president, John Devecka, is a consultant for Red Octane and Activision which now owns all of Devecka Enterprises' US and international patents and produces the Guitar Hero series.
