= Ryoichi Hirano =

Japanese ballet dancer

Ryoichi Hirano 平野 亮一
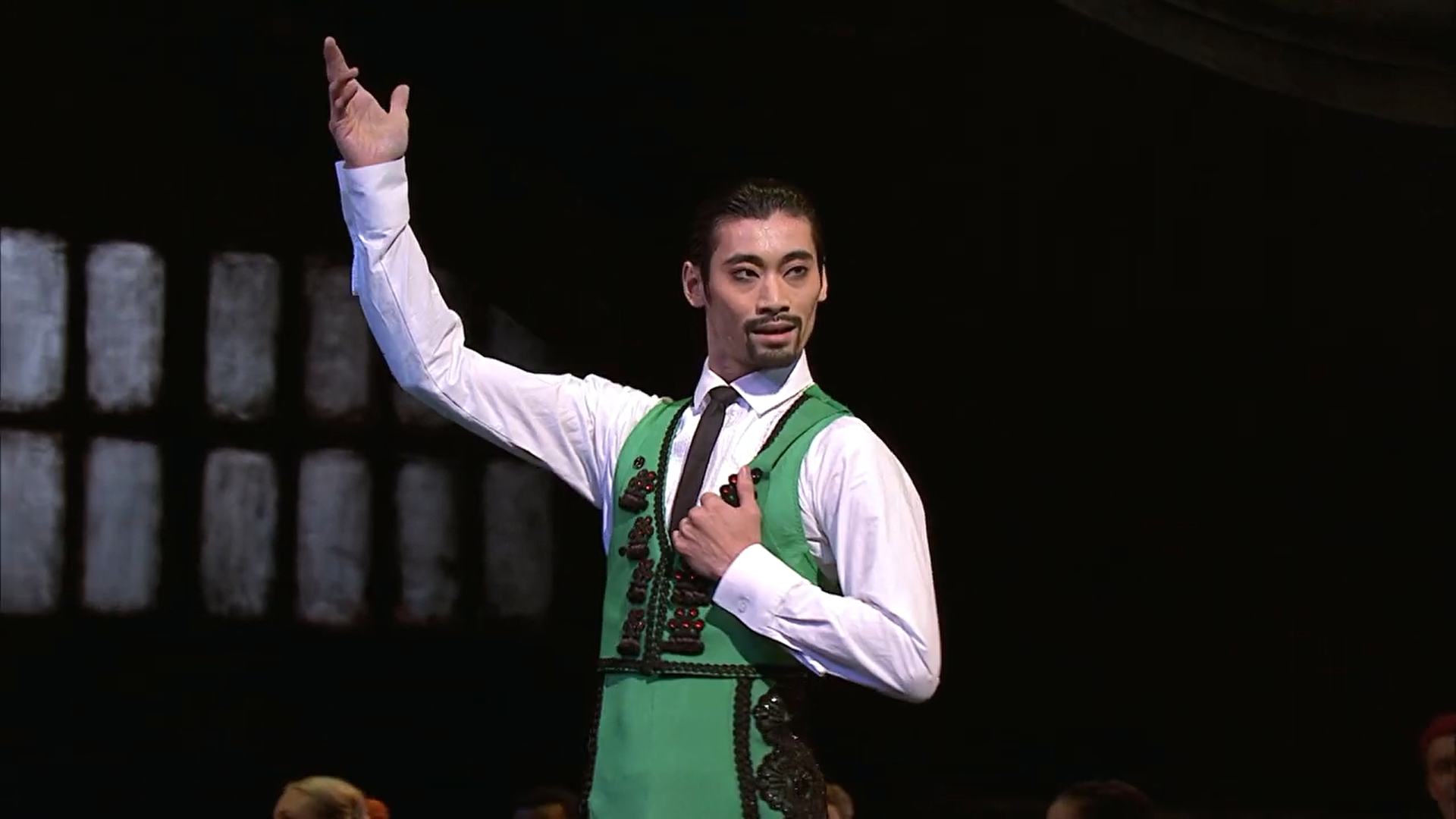
- Hirano as Don Quixote, 2021
- Born: 1983 or 1984 (age 40–41); Osaka, Japan
- Occupation: ballet dancer
- Years active: 2001-present
- Career
- Current group: The Royal Ballet

Ryoichi Hirano (平野 亮一, born 1983/84) is a Japanese ballet dancer who is a principal dancer with the Royal Ballet in London.

== Early life ==
Hirano was born in Osaka. He had his ballet training at his mother's dance school. His brother was a dancer with the National Ballet of Canada.

== Career ==
In 2001, after Hirano competed at the Prix de Lausanne, he became an apprentice with The Royal Ballet in London. He made his stage debut as a corps dancer in the third act of Cranko's Onegin. He joined the company as an Artist in 2002, then became a First Artist in 2007, Soloist in 2008 and First Soloist in 2012. In 2016, at age 32, Hirano was promoted to Principal Dancer. He and Akane Takada, who was promoted the same year, are the third and fourth Japanese principal dancers in the company, after Tetsuya Kumakawa and Miyako Yoshida.

== Critical reviews ==
In an October 2018 review in The Guardian, Luke Jennings called Hirano "a dashing dancer and fine actor", but that he and Natalia Osipova were "uneasy bedfellows" in MacMillan’s Mayerling.

In a February 2019 review of Hirano's performance as Espada the Matador in Don Quixote, Laura Freeman in The Spectator wrote, "Ryoichi Hirano is the Mata-phwoar. The corps de ballet swoon and flutter. He is sexy, even caddish. I was a Hirano doubter, but this was a magnificent performance: athletic power matched by classical control. A bullfighter one moment, ballerino the next."
