= Amanda Truelove =

British cellist

Amanda Truelove (born 1961) is a cellist from the United Kingdom. She studied with Joan Dickson and Amaryllis Fleming at the Royal College of Music and later became a professor at the same college.

Truelove was a scholarship student of Joan Dickson at the Royal College of Music and later studied with Johannes Goritzki in Düsseldorf. Among other major influences on her work, she lists cellists Anner Bylsma, Jacqueline du Pré and Bruno Guiranna.

Amanda Truelove has three children.
