= Irena Kosíková =

Czech organist and composer

Irena Kosíková is a Czech organist and composer.

Irena Kosíková was born in Prague the daughter of the banned philosopher Karel Kosík and the literary historian Růžena Grebeníčková. She began her organ studies with Prof. Jan Hora, together with piano lessons given by Prof. Eliška Kleinová and Prof. Arnoštka Grünfeldová. Irena Kosíková studied organ performance (Prof. Jaroslava Potměšilová) and conducting (with Prof. Karel Fiala) at Ježek's Conservatory. She was refused further studies for political reasons. She took private composition lessons with Prof. Miroslav Raichl. Finally after the Velvet Revolution she was accepted at the Janáček Academy of Music (JAMU) in Brno into the organ class of Prof. Alena Veselá and Prof. Kamila Klugarová. She graduated at the Academy of Music (HAMU) in Prague, under the guidance of Prof. Josef Popelka. Irena Kosíková now gives organ concerts and is also intensively composing. Her works have been performed in the Czech Republic, Algeria, Bosnia and Herzegovina, Belgium, Bulgaria, France, Germany, Israel, Poland, Russia, Turkey, Sweden and the United Kingdom. As an organist she specialises in the interpretation of organ works written by Johann Sebastian Bach: including performances of the complete Organ Toccatas, Voluntaries, Leipzig Chorals, The Art of Fugue, Organ Mass. On the occasion of the 110th anniversary commemoration of the birth of Jewish writer Jiří Weil (1900 - 1959), Irena Kosíková was commissioned to create ballet "MAKANNA" for voice, cello and orchestra, its concert performance was held under the auspices of Sir Tom Stoppard and Václav Havel.
