= Falco Kapuste =

German former ballet dancer and choreographer

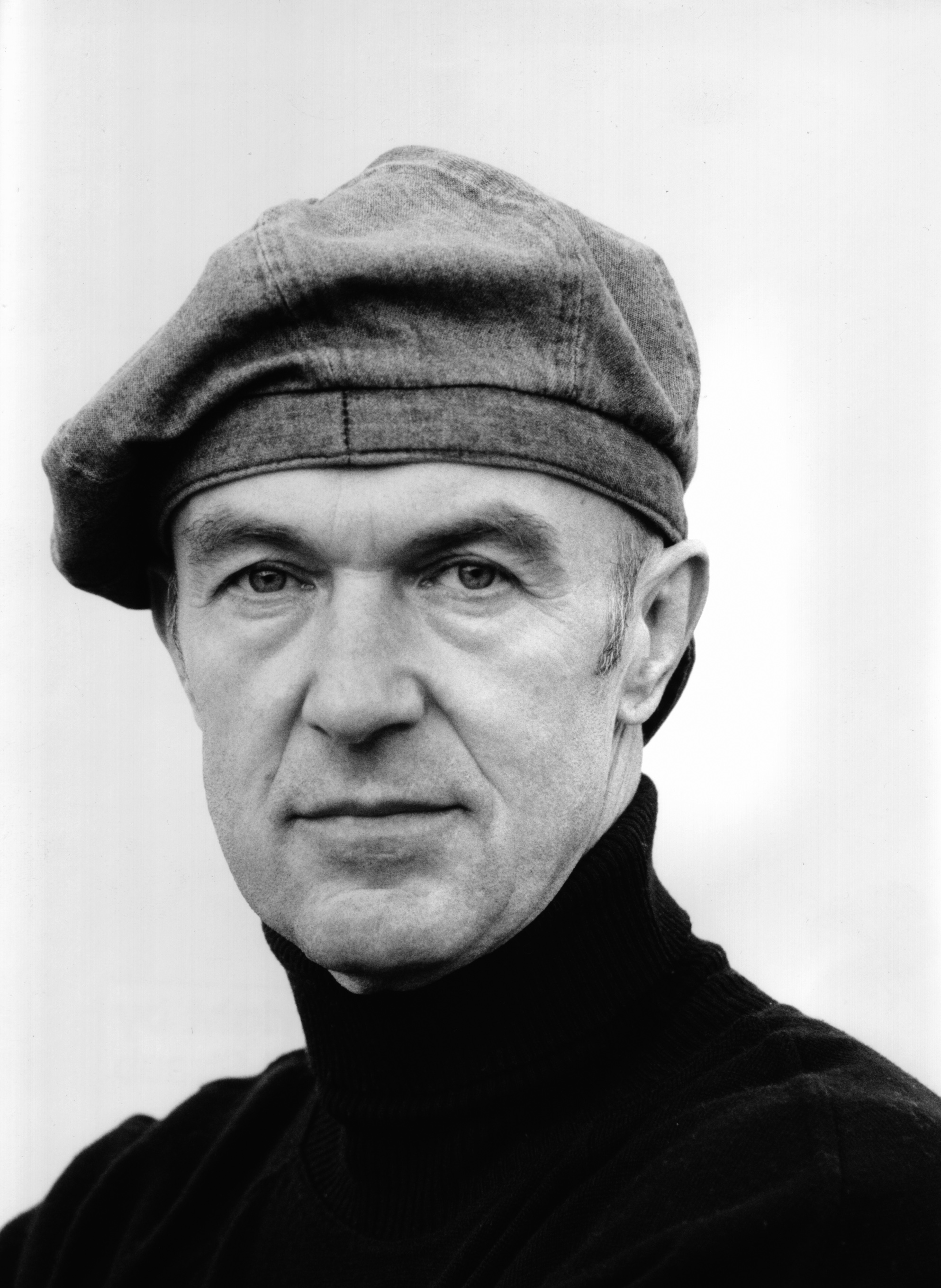
Falco Kapuste

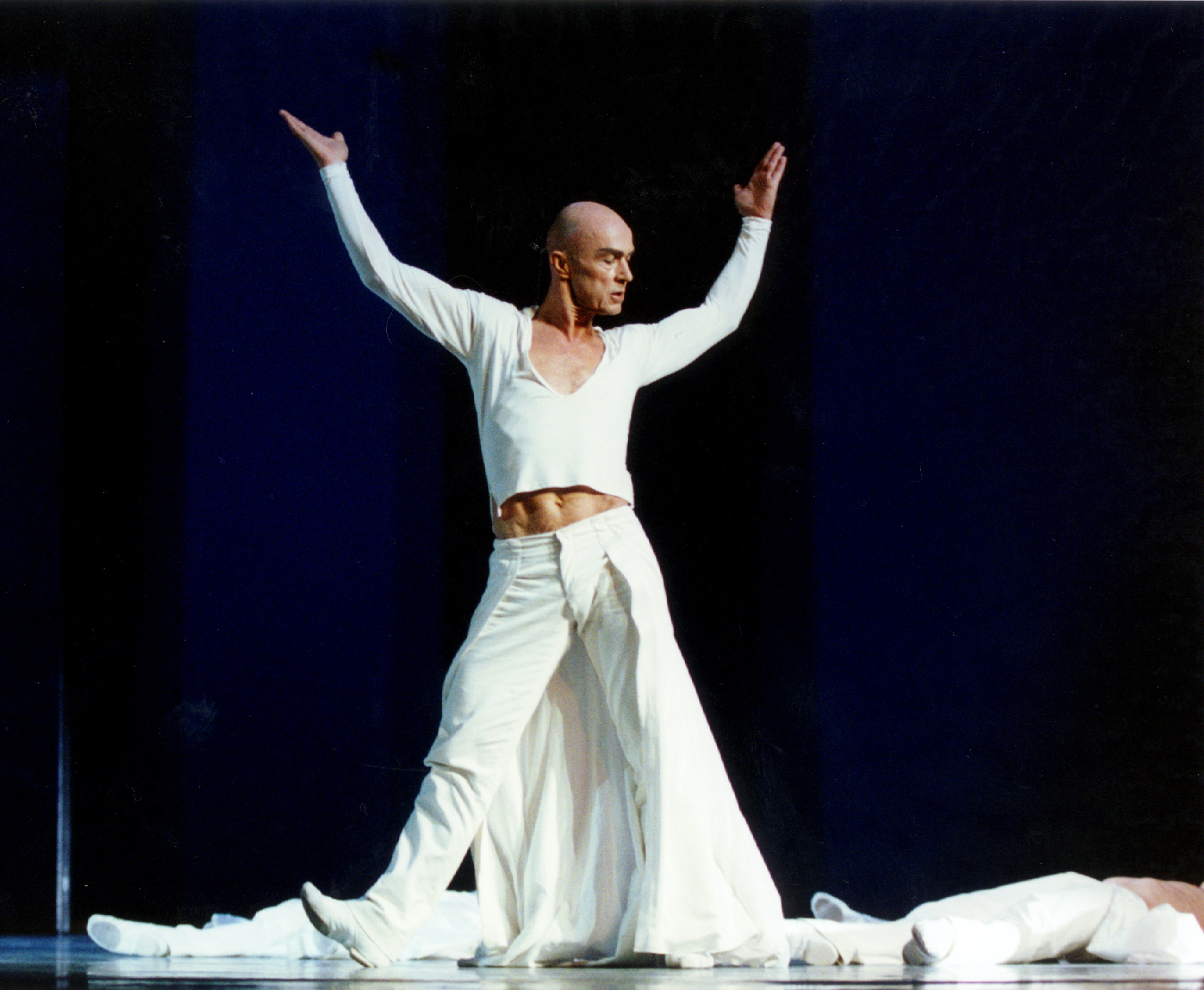
Kapuste as Phädra

Falco Kapuste (born 1943) is a German former ballet dancer and choreographer.

Kapuste was educated at the University of Music and Theatre in Hanover.

Kapuste has danced with Hamburg State Opera, Deutsche Oper Berlin, and Rhine Opera from 1970.
