= JamLegend =

- Developer: Foobrew
- Final release: 1.2.50 / 1 November 2011
- Operating system: Internet: website
- Type: Music video game
- License: Proprietary
- Website: www.jamlegend.com

JamLegend was an online, browser-based music video game, similar to Guitar Hero, developed by American studio Foobrew.

As of April 29, 2011, JamLegend ceased all of its activity and closed the site. A list of the artists that contributed was kept on the front page of the website until the domain registration expired.

== History ==
JamLegend was created by Andrew Lee, Arjun Lall, and Ryan Wilson in 2008. The company participated in the LaunchBox Digital 2008 summer cycle. The game was in private beta from August 2008 to December 2008 when the players needed invitations to access the game. On December 4, 2008, JamLegend became open-beta so players no longer needed invitations to register.

In March 2009, JamLegend reached 5 million plays. In July 2009, JamLegend reached Version 1, releasing new features.

== Closure ==
On 29 April 2011, FooBrew announced that JamLegend will be closing to "move on to new ventures". From 18 April 2011, VIP memberships could no longer be purchased, and on April 28 all user data was deleted. Users with leftover JamCash or months of VIP membership past May 27, 2011 may be eligible for a refund due to the closure. To find out more and to see if they qualify for a refund, gamers could go to the refund section of the website, which however currently just links back to the homepage.

== Features ==
Playing "Open Your Eyes" by Your Favorite Enemies in GuitarJam mode, Legendary Difficulty

- Ability to play on most computers that have internet access. The only requirement is to have the Adobe Flash plug-in installed.
- Two instruments to play: guitar and drums ("BeatJam").
- Multiple styles of gameplay: Guitar Tap and Guitar Strum. Guitar Strum requires the player to strum the note (which makes 2-, 3- and 4-note chords possible) and Guitar Tap does not need strumming.
- Four song difficulties: Normal, Skilled, Insane and Legendary. In Normal, only three keys are used (1-3), then four in Skilled, and five for Insane and Legendary.
- Single- and multi-playing: there are three modes : Solo, Duels (player against player) and Showdowns (real-time multiplayer).
- Upload and play songs: (Song Uploader) Users can upload any song by any artist that they own from their computers. Players upload an mp3 and a track they create for the song to make a playable track on JamLegend. Free accounts can upload five songs maximum (100 for Pro, and 500 for Pro Plus), though self-uploaded songs are only playable in BeatJam, unless a track has been made for the song.

== Account types ==
In Version 1.0, features such as "Pro" and "Pro Plus" Accounts were introduced.

	Free account	Pro account	Pro Plus account
Uploads	5 songs	100 songs	500 songs
Advertisements	Yes	No	No
Removing possible	No	Yes	Yes
Badge	No	Yes	Yes
Price	Free	$4.99US per month, (1st month is $1.99US) $29.99 per year	$9.99US per month, (1st month is $1.99) $49.99 per year

== Available music ==
More than 1620 songs were available to play, as at June 2010. Some of these songs were automatically tracked by a computer program (this is the case for the BeatJam tracks), but most of the popular songs were tracked by trackers/producers.

== Services used ==
- The game is programmed in Java and Flex.
- The front-end pages are displaying the game with the Adobe Flash Player.
- Amazon Web Services are used for data storage.
- The Get Satisfaction platform provides technical support, help and to receive suggestions and feedback.

== Awards ==
JamLegend won the CNET WebWare 100 Winner: Audio and Music in 2009.

== Response after closure ==
After a lot of comments and frustration asking to bring JamLegend back, two software engineers started a project about creating another game base on the same game play of JamLegend.

Some other users tried to replicate JamLegend and made available copies of offline versions, such as JamProject, which packed several dozens of song packs mostly contributed by trackers and producers who contributed greatly to JamLegend. Due to timing issues, lack of profit to keep a site and professional staff to work on the project stagnated the progress, however the project left everyone a modified copy of JamLegend's flash software that can be used for offline playing for entertainment purposes.

JamProject was created by Luna, frequent player, moderator and producer at JamLegend before it closed, and Chuck, who was brought to the project by Luna and was responsible for creating an offline version of the game. Luna and Chuck are Portuguese and both worked together on JamProject. The third member was Puchyy, a contributor from Argentina who had joined the group later.
