= Piano Concerto No. 2 (Shostakovich) =

1957 concerto by Dmitri Shostakovich

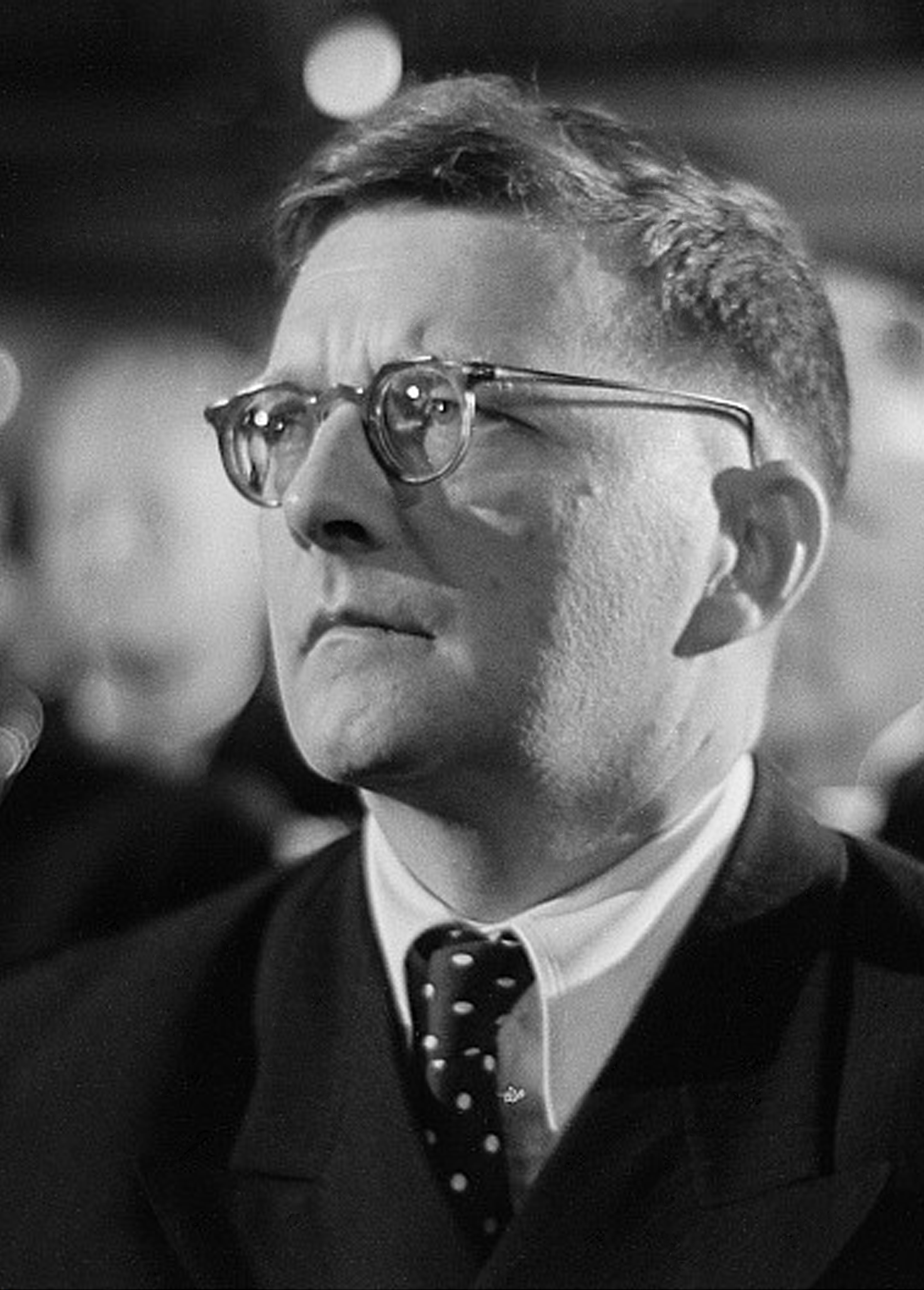
Dmitri Shostakovich in 1950

The Piano Concerto No. 2 in F major, Op. 102, by Dmitri Shostakovich was composed in 1957 for the 19th birthday of his son Maxim, who premiered the piece on 10 May 1957 during his graduation concert at the Moscow Conservatory. It contains many similar elements to Shostakovich's Concertino for Two Pianos: both works were written to be accessible for developing young pianists. It is an uncharacteristically cheerful piece for Shostakovich.

== Music ==
The work is scored for solo piano, two flutes, piccolo, two oboes, two clarinets, two bassoons, four horns, timpani, snare drum, and strings.

The concerto lasts around 20 minutes and has three movements, with the last played attacca: "attached" to the second (i.e. to be played without any gap or pause between the end of the second movement and the start of the third).

1. Allegro
2. Andante
3. Allegro

The first movement is in sonata form. The main theme of the first movement is played first by the bassoon, then soon accompanied by the clarinets and oboes. The piano answers with its own theme, played as single notes in both hands an octave apart. This develops into a march-like theme. A new theme in D minor is then introduced, with unisons two octaves apart on the piano, winding down to nothing. Then, an abrupt blast from the orchestra leads into tumultuous and low jumping octaves on the lower piano, while the orchestra plays a variation on the original piano melody fortissimo. The piano builds in a triplet pattern to introduce the D-minor theme (now in B♭ major) in an augmentation in a triumphant tutti. At the climax, the piano comes in with a contrapuntal solo. After a minute of the fugato, the orchestra returns, playing the melody in the high winds. The orchestra builds on the main melody while the piano plays scales and tremolos, which lead into a few lines of chords and octaves by the piano, with the main theme finally resurfacing and bringing the movement to a close.

The second movement presents two different themes that are in variation form. Strings start gently in C minor, with a short introduction before the piano comes in with a triplet theme in C major. Although it remains slow throughout, and works within a comparatively small range, it is marked by the recurrence of two- or four-on-three rhythms.

The finale is a dance in duple time, making much use of pentatonic scales and modes. Soon, the second theme is introduced, in 7/8 time, with the piano accompanied by balalaika-like pizzicato strings. This carries on for a short time before a new motif arrives in "Hanon" exercise mode, with scales in sixths and semiquaver runs, this being the joke for Maxim's graduation. These three themes are then developed and interwoven before a final statement of the 7/8 theme and finally a virtuoso coda in F major.

== Reception ==
In a letter to Edison Denisov in mid-February 1957, barely a week after he had finished work on it, the composer himself wrote that the work had "no redeeming artistic merits". It has been suggested that Shostakovich wanted to pre-empt criticism by deprecating the work himself (having been the victim of official censure numerous times), and that the comment was actually meant to be tongue-in-cheek. In April 1957, he and his son performed a two piano arrangement of the work for the Ministry of Culture, and then it was later premiered for the public at the Moscow Conservatory.

Despite the apparently simple nature of this concerto, the public has always regarded it warmly, and it stands as one of Shostakovich's most popular pieces. In 2017, the concerto was voted 19th in the Classic FM Hall of Fame. In 2024, it was 9th.

== Recordings ==
Despite his dismissal of the concerto, the composer performed it himself on a number of occasions, and recorded it along with his first concerto. Both are played with fast tempi. His playing in his third and last recording evinces the onset of the progressive neuro-muscular disorder that ended his pianistic career. In his recordings of the second movement, Shostakovich presents slight variations in some passages that are not written in the score. Some examples include a repeated chord Shostakovich plays from bar 33 that is from the first beat of bar 34 is written as a tie in the score.

Maxim's own son, Dmitri Maximovich Shostakovich, also recorded the piece, with his father conducting I Musici de Montreal. Dmitri the younger approaches his grandfather's tempi and phrasing.

Other recordings include those by Leonard Bernstein as soloist and conductor for Columbia Records, Marc-André Hamelin for Hyperion Records, and Dmitri Alexeev with Jerzy Maksymiuk conducting the English Chamber Orchestra. There has been a recording of this concerto by the Mariinsky Orchestra with soloist, Denis Matsuev and Valery Gergiev as conductor.

== Ballet ==
The concerto is used in two different ballets:

- Kenneth MacMillan's Concerto premiered on 30 November 1966 at the Deutsche Oper Berlin; it then became a part of The Royal Ballet's repertoire.
- Alexei Ratmansky created Concerto DSCH for the New York City Ballet, and premiered in 2008. It (in whole or in part) has been performed by NYCB in other seasons subsequently, including as part of Wendy Whelan's farewell performance, and as a videoed tribute during the COVID-19 pandemic.

== Sources ==
- Bostan, Maria Cristina (2014). "Concerto in F Major, Op. 102 for Piano and Orchestra by Dmitri Sostakovici". Bulletin of the Transilvania University of Braşov, Series VIII: Performing Arts. 7 (2): 33–42.
- Moshevich, Sofia (2004). Dmitri Shostakovich, Pianist. Montreal: McGill-Queen's University Press. ISBN 0-7735-2581-5.
