= Richard Armstrong (conductor) =

British conductor (born 1943)

Sir Richard Armstrong CBE (born 7 January 1943, in Leicester, England) is an English conductor. He was educated at Wyggeston Grammar School for Boys and Corpus Christi College, Cambridge, where he was an organ scholar.

== Overview ==
From 1973 until 1986 Armstrong was musical director of the Welsh National Opera. In this period he worked in collaboration with many leading European directors, including Peter Stein, Joachim Herz, Lucian Pintilie, and Harry Kupfer, conducting a wide repertoire of Verdi, Wagner, Janáček, Strauss, Berg and Britten and, in 1986, performances of the complete Ring Cycle. He has returned regularly to WNO as a guest conductor, notably for the world première of Peter Maxwell Davies’s The Doctor of Myddfai, and for Peter Stein’s 1988 production of Falstaff, which he also conducted in New York, Milan, Paris and Tokyo.

He was Music Director of Scottish Opera from 1993 to 2005. During this time he conducted operas including Jenůfa, From the House of the Dead, I due Foscari, Salome, Fidelio, Mary Stuart, Káťa Kabanová, Peter Grimes, Tristan und Isolde, La forza del destino, The Jacobin, La traviata, Il trovatore, the world première of James MacMillan's Inês de Castro (a revival of which was broadcast by BBC television), The Cunning Little Vixen, Turandot, Hansel and Gretel, La bohème, The Queen of Spades, Dalibor, Der Rosenkavalier, Macbeth, Parsifal, Don Giovanni, Erwartung, Bluebeard's Castle and The Knot Garden. He conducted five complete performances of Scottish Opera’s acclaimed production of the Ring Cycle, which opened at the 2003 Edinburgh International Festival and was subsequently seen at the Theatre Royal Glasgow, and The Lowry, Salford. He led Scottish Opera on a number of visits abroad: to Lisbon in 1994, to the 2000 Vienna Festival, where the Company performed its highly praised production of Macbeth, and to Porto in 2001, where he conducted the European première of MacMillan’s Inês de Castro.

After Cambridge, Richard Armstrong joined the music staff of the Royal Opera, Covent Garden, where he worked with Georg Solti on the Ring, with Carlo Maria Giulini on La traviata, with Otto Klemperer on Fidelio and with Rafael Kubelík on Jenůfa.

In the UK he has conducted Billy Budd, Andrea Chénier, Un ballo in maschera and Don Carlos for Royal Opera, Covent Garden, and Aida, Wozzeck, The Makropoulos Affair, and (in a co-production with Scottish Opera) the UK premières of Schnittke’s Life with an Idiot for English National Opera. His opera work abroad includes engagements in Frankfurt (where he was, for two seasons, Principal Guest Conductor), Geneva, Paris, Munich, Amsterdam, Rome, Lisbon, Brussels, Nice, Canada, Australia, Stuttgart, Berlin, Toulouse and Los Angeles.

In 1978 he won the Janáček Medal in recognition of the pioneering Janáček cycle produced in collaboration with David Pountney for Welsh National Opera and Scottish Opera. In 2004 he conducted Káťa Kabanová for the Janáček Festival in the composer’s native Brno to celebrate the 150th anniversary of the composer's birth.

Richard Armstrong made his BBC Proms début in 1979, and has worked with many leading British orchestras, including the London Philharmonic, Philharmonia, BBC Symphony Orchestra, BBC National Orchestra of Wales, Hallé, Bournemouth Symphony Orchestra, Royal Philharmonic Orchestra, Scottish Chamber Orchestra, the Royal Scottish National Orchestra, and the City of Birmingham Symphony Orchestra.

He has recorded CDs with Roberto Alagna, Angela Gheorghiu, Deborah Voigt and Thomas Hampson with the LPO, Orchestra of the Royal Opera House, Covent Garden, the Bavarian Radio Symphony Orchestra, and the Orchestra of the Age of Enlightenment.

== Honours and awards ==
In 1993 Richard Armstrong was made Commander of the Order of the British Empire (CBE) for Services to Music, and was also knighted in the 2004 New Year’s honours. In 1997, he was awarded the United Kingdom Conductor of the Year by the Royal Philharmonic Music Society. He is an Honorary Fellow of Corpus Christi College, Cambridge, an Honorary Member of the Royal Academy of Music, and holds honorary doctorates in Music from Glasgow, Aberdeen and St Andrews universities.
