= František Neumann =

Czech conductor and composer

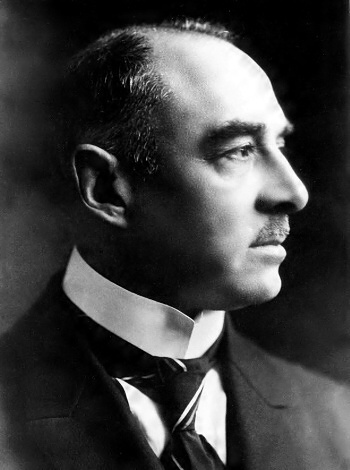
František Neumann (1874–1929)

František Neumann (16 June 1874 – 25 February 1929) was a Czech conductor and composer. He was particularly associated with the National Theatre in Brno, and the composer Leoš Janáček, the premieres of many of whose operas he conducted.

== Biography ==
František Neumann was born in Přerov, Moravia in 1874. He attended school in Prostějov and Chrudim, then went to work in Prague while studying music under K. Sebor. He spent a year in voluntary military service at Olomouc, then joined his father's smoked meat business.

His serious music studies commenced in 1896 at the Leipzig Conservatory under Carl Reinecke and Salomon Jadassohn, and continued under Felix Mottl in Karlsruhe, where he worked as chorus master at the local theatre. Further posts were at Hamburg, Ratisbon, Linz, Liberec, Teplice and Frankfurt, where he remained until 1919.

He returned to Czechoslovakia and became Chief Conductor at the National Theatre in Brno, becoming its director in 1925. In his first season 1919-20 he introduced regular subscription concerts, and he brought a much needed discipline to the fledgling organisation. There, among other achievements, he premiered four of Leoš Janáček's operas:

- Káťa Kabanová (1921)
- The Cunning Little Vixen (1924)
- Šárka (Janáček's first opera, composed 1887 but not performed until his 70th birthday in 1925)
- The Makropulos Affair (1926).

Neumann was also the first to conduct Janáček's orchestral rhapsody Taras Bulba. He also conducted the first performance in Czechoslovakia of Debussy's opera Pelléas et Mélisande, and new works by Vítězslav Novák and Otakar Ostrčil.

He also taught conducting at the Brno Conservatory from its founding in 1919 until his death in 1929, aged 54. His students included Zdeněk Chalabala and Břetislav Bakala, who conducted the premiere of From the House of the Dead in 1930, after Neumann's death.

== Compositions ==
Neumann's own works include eleven operas, two ballets, two cantatas, a Moravian Rhapsody, a Piano Trio, an Octet, and many other works.

== External sources ==
- The Concise Oxford Dictionary of Music
- Encyklopedie Brna
