= Sinfonietta (Janáček) =

Composition for orchestra by Leoš Janáček

- "Military Sinfonietta" "Sokol Festival"
- by Leoš Janáček
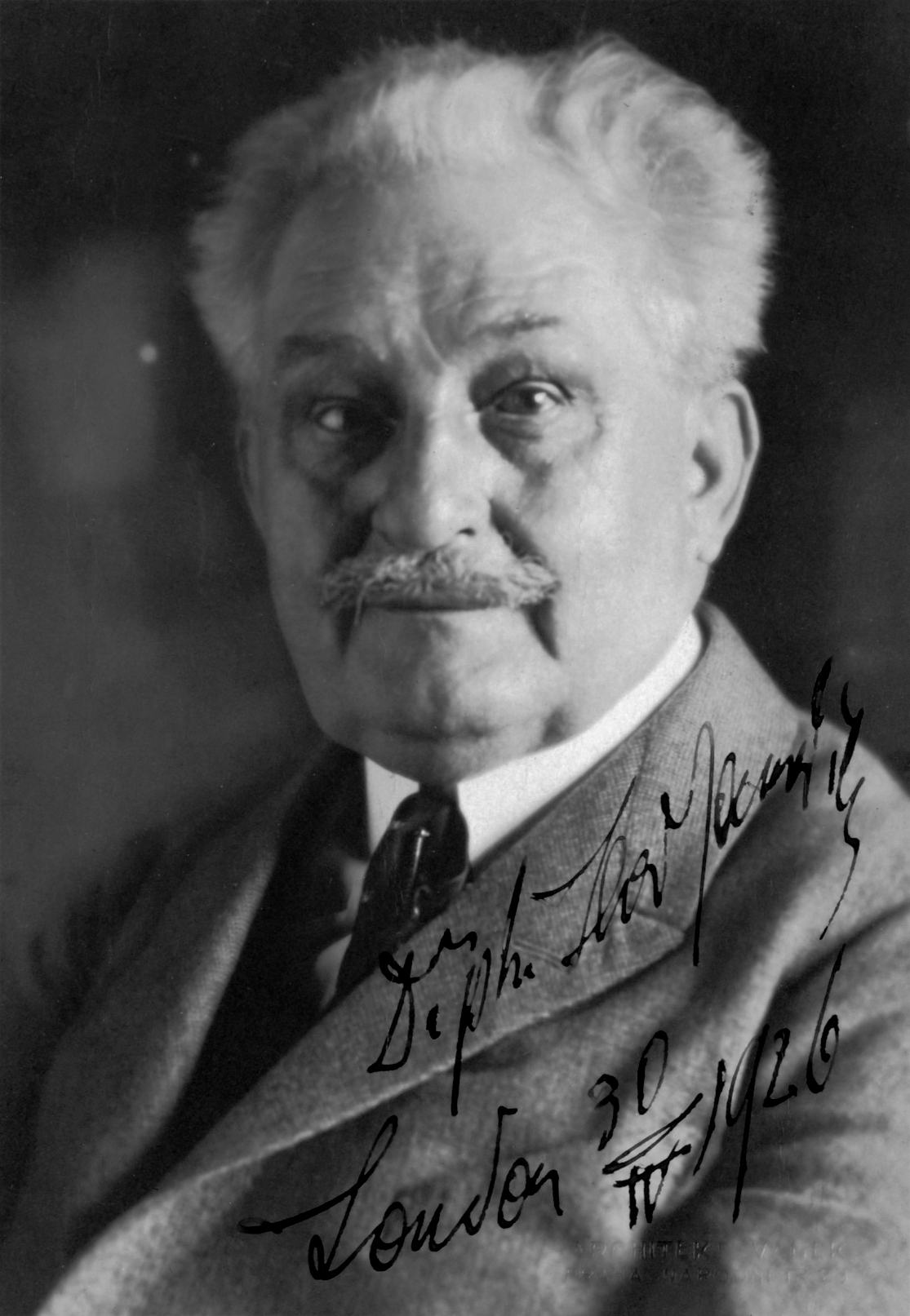
- Leos Janácek in 1926
- Period: Post-romanticism
- Composed: 1926
- Dedication: To the Czechoslovak Army
- Duration: 20–25 minutes
- Movements: Five

Premiere
- Date: 26 June 1926
- Location: Prague
- Conductor: Václav Talich

The Sinfonietta (subtitled "Military Sinfonietta" or "Sokol Festival") from 1926 is a late work for large orchestra (of which 25 are brass players) by the Czech composer Leoš Janáček. It is dedicated "To the Czechoslovak Army" and Janáček said it was intended to express "contemporary free man, his spiritual beauty and joy, his strength, courage and determination to fight for victory". It started by Janáček listening to a brass band, becoming inspired to write some fanfares of his own. When the organisers of the Sokol Gymnastic Festival approached him for a commission, he developed the material into the Sinfonietta. He later dropped the word military. The first performance was in Prague on 26 June 1926 under Václav Talich.

The typical performance duration is 20–25 minutes.

== Structure ==
Sinfonietta is typical of Janáček's tight construction in that the material of each movement derives from the opening motif. It features several variants based on Janáček's original fanfare.

The piece is in five movements, all of which have descriptive subtitles:

1. Allegretto — Allegro maestoso (Fanfare)
2. Andante — Allegretto (The Castle, Brno)
3. Moderato (The Queen's Monastery, Brno)
4. Allegretto (The Street Leading to the Castle)
5. Andante con moto (The Town Hall, Brno)

The first movement is scored only for brass and percussion. The second movement begins with a rapid ostinato from the winds but later has a more lyrical episode. The third begins quietly in the strings but is interrupted by a stern figure in the trombones, leading to another fast dance-like passage. In the fourth movement, Janáček celebrates the newly liberated Czechoslovakia with a joyous trumpet fanfare. The finale begins in the key of E♭ minor with a calm retrograde version of the opening melody. However, this quickly moves into a triumphant finale, the return of the opening fanfare decorated with swirling figures in the strings and wind.

== Instrumentation ==
The score calls for the following orchestra with expanded brass section:

Woodwinds
Piccolo, alternating Flute 4.
3 Flutes
2 Oboes, 2nd alternating English horn
2 Clarinets in B♭, one alternating Clarinet in E♭
Bass clarinet
2 Bassoons

Brass
4 Horns in F
9 Trumpets in C*
3 Trumpets in F
2 Bass trumpets*

4 Trombones
2 Euphoniums (as "Tenor Tubas")*
Tuba

Percussion (2 players)
Timpani*
Cymbals
Chimes

Strings
Harp

Violins I, II
Violas
Violoncellos
Double basses

*) The nine C trumpets, bass trumpets, tenor tubas and the timpani are heard only in the first and last movements; the first three C trumpets are present in the second.

== Arrangements ==
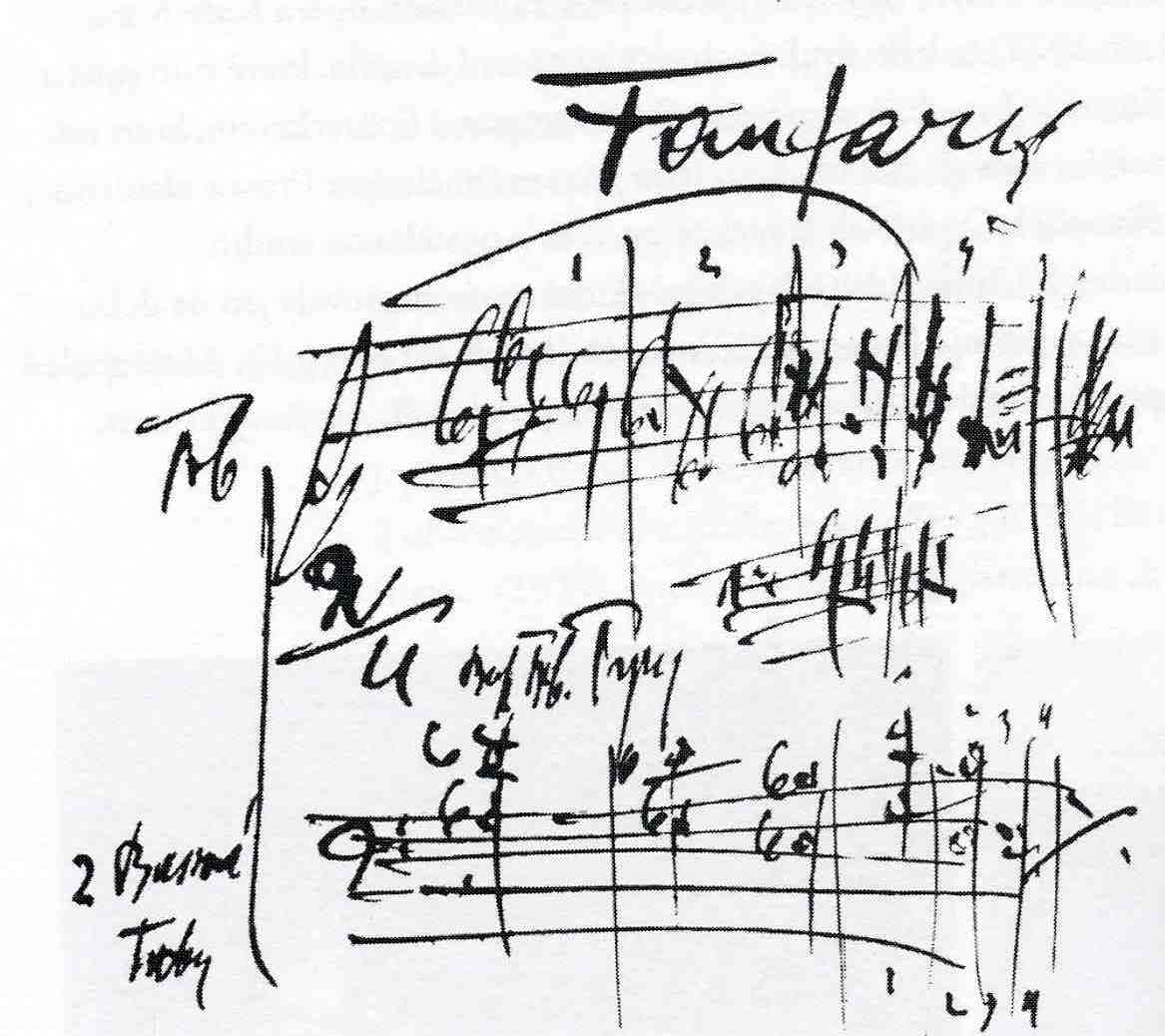
Fanfares of the Sinfonietta, Janáček's autograph score

The work was transcribed for wind ensemble by Don Patterson in 1994 and by Merlin Patterson 1996, the latter being recorded by the University of Houston Wind Ensemble, conducted by Eddie Green, the following year. This work was also used by the progressive rock band Emerson, Lake & Palmer for their piece entitled "Knife-Edge" on their eponymous album.

1. Arrangement suitable for: orchestra
  - arrangement for: brass ensemble
  - arrangement by: Rolf Smedwig
  - performed by: Empire Brass
2. Arrangement suitable for: orchestra
  - arrangement for: brass band
  - arrangement by: Steven Hamstra
  - performed by: Brass Band De Wâldsang, conductor Rieks van der Velde
3. Arrangement suitable for: orchestra
  - arrangement for: brass sextet
  - arrangement by: František Jílek
  - performed by: Brno Czech Brass Sextet
4. Arrangement suitable for: orchestra
  - arrangement for: wind orchestra
  - arrangement by: Karel Bělohoubek
  - performed by: Czech Army Central Band, conductor Vladimír Válek
5. Arrangement suitable for: orchestra
  - arrangement for: wind orchestra
  - arrangement by: Hynek Sluka
  - performed by: Prague Castle Guard and Police Wind Orchestra, conductor Miroslav Hanzal
6. Arrangement suitable for: orchestra
  - arrangement for: wind ensemble
  - arrangement by: Merlin Patterson
  - performed by: University of Houston Wind Ensemble, conductor Eddie Green
7. Arrangement suitable for: orchestra
  - arrangement for: organ
  - arrangement by: Josh Perschbacher
  - performed by: org Josh Perschbacher
8. Arrangement suitable for: orchestra
  - arrangement for: symphonic wind band
  - arrangement by: Simon Scheiwiller
  - performed by: Banda Municipal de Barcelona, conductor Salvador Brotons
9. Arrangement suitable for: orchestra
  - arrangement for: wind ensemble
  - arrangement by: Donald Patterson
  - performed by: "The President's Own" United States Marine Band
  - also performed by: The United States Coast Guard Band

== Selected recordings ==
- Břetislav Bakala/Czech Philharmonic: Supraphon 1203-V (1950)
- George Szell/Cleveland Orchestra: Sony 88697 58952 2
- Karel Ančerl/Czech Philharmonic: Supraphon 3684
- Simon Rattle/Philharmonia Orchestra: EMI 5-66980-2
- Sir Charles Mackerras/Vienna Philharmonic: London 410138-2
- André Previn/Los Angeles Philharmonic: Telarc CD-80174
- František Jílek/Brno Philharmonic: Supraphon 110282-2
- Libor Pešek/Philharmonia Orchestra: Virgin VC791506-2
- José Serebrier/Brno Philharmonic: Reference Recordings HCDC

== Media ==
Sinfonietta: II. Andante (The Castle) (sound sample)
Organ arrangement: Josh Perschbacher

=== Appearances and references in other work ===
A rearrangement of the opening of the Sinfonietta was used by the progressive rock band Emerson, Lake & Palmer for their song "Knife-Edge" on their debut album.

The opening of the fourth movement (usually no more than about 40 seconds of it) was used as the theme tune for the UK Granada Television series Crown Court during the 1970s and 1980s, although it was never heard in full in any episode. It would be during this opening that the court reporter, Peter Wheeler, would, as a voice-over, either set the scene for the episode or else describe plot events that had occurred in previous episodes.

The third movement, Moderato (The Queen's Monastery), was the inspiration and soundtrack for the animated film The Queen's Monastery by Emma Calder.

Haruki Murakami's novel 1Q84 begins with the Sinfonietta playing on a taxi's radio. The work then appears several times later in the novel as a recurring theme connecting the two main characters. The popularity of the novel has led to an increase in sales of recordings of the Sinfonietta in Japan.
