= Šárka (Janáček) =

1925 opera by Leoš Janáček

- Opera by Leoš Janáček
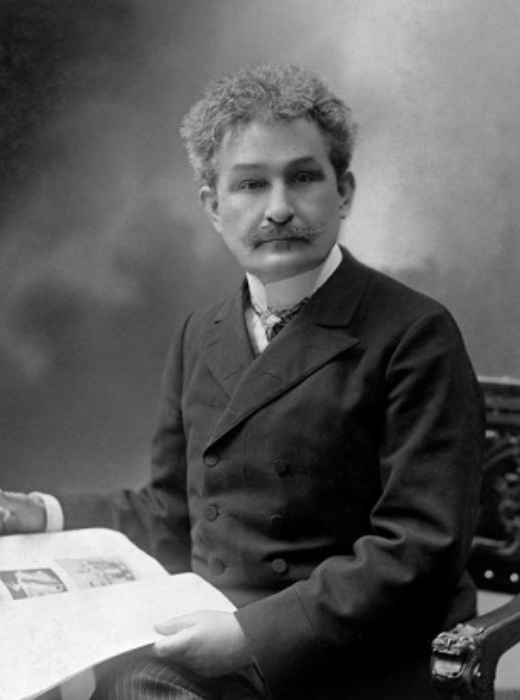
- Janáček in 1904
- Librettist: Julius Zeyer
- Language: Czech
- Based on: Bohemian legends of Šárka
- Premiere: 11 November 1925; Divadlo na Hradbách, Brno

Šárka is an opera in three acts by Leoš Janáček to a Czech libretto by Julius Zeyer, based on Bohemian legends of Šárka in Dalimil's Chronicle. Written in 1887, the opera lay unproduced for many years and was first performed at the Divadlo na Hradbách (today's Mahen Theatre) in Brno on 11 November 1925 in honour of Janáček's 71st birthday.

== Performance history ==
The premiere of the Ur-version (1887) of Šárka took place on 26 November 2010 at the Reduta Studio Theatre Brno as part of the Janáček Biennale, conducted from the piano by Ondrej Olos, with Lucie Kašparová in the title role. This first version (of which 30% of the music is retained in the score generally performed today) was sent to Dvořák for comment, but rested in the Janáček archive until 2010; the final version, with fewer motives and longer set-pieces, presages his mature works.

The composer had never completed the work, but, after the success of his later operas, Šárka was revised and the orchestration completed by his pupil Osvald Chlubna who had been given the task in preparation for the opera's eventual publication.

In 2000, Jiří Zahrádka edited a new edition of the score. A recording was made later that year based on this edition, with Sir Charles Mackerras conducting the Czech Philharmonic and with Eva Urbanová in the title role; it was issued the following year (Supraphon SU 3485-2-631).

A staged piano version was performed at the 2026 Janáček Festival Brno with pianist Julius Drake and broadcast on OperaVision.

The premiere stage setting was designed by the architect and painter Vlastislav Hofman.

== Roles ==
Roles, voice types, premiere cast
Role	Voice type	Premiere cast, 11 November 1925 Conductor: František Neumann
Častava	contralto	
Ctirad	tenor	Emil Olšovský
Hosta	contralto	
Libina	soprano	
Mlada	soprano	
Přemysl	baritone	Arnold Flögl
Radka	mezzo-soprano	
Šárka	soprano	Hana Pírková
Svatava	soprano	
Lumir	tenor	Valentin Šindler
Vlasta	mezzo-soprano	

== Synopsis ==
Time: Mythological
Place:

Before the opera begins, during Libuše's reign, women experienced a golden age and the female population had become the privileged members of society, but after her death this was not the case, causing a revolt that produced a female army, of whom Šárka was the fiercest warrior.

As the opera opens, the morale of the male troops is flagging, yet is restored by the young Ctirad, who guards Libuše's tomb. The women enter the sepulchre, but are scared by the appearance of Ctirad, and swear vengeance. Šárka plans to trap the young male warrior, and the maidens tie her to a tree, apparently open and helpless. Ctirad finds her, takes pity and unties her, falling in love with Šárka, but she also falls in love with him. As they sleep in each other's arms, Šárka remembers her resolve and uses her horn to call for the maidens to come and kill Ctirad and his warriors. In Act 3, Lumir brings the body of Ctirad to Vyšehrad, and during the funeral Šárka, grief-stricken, throws herself onto his pyre and dies in the flames as the chorus sings a lament for the lovers.

== Other musical depictions of Šárka ==
Czech Bedřich Smetana composed the tone poem Šárka in 1875 as the third part of his cycle Má vlast, which does not contain the final suicide narrated in the opera.

Zdeněk Fibich composed an opera Šárka to a libretto by Anežka Schulzová in 1896–1897 that remains popular in the Czech Republic.
