= Břetislav Bakala =

Czech conductor, pianist and composer

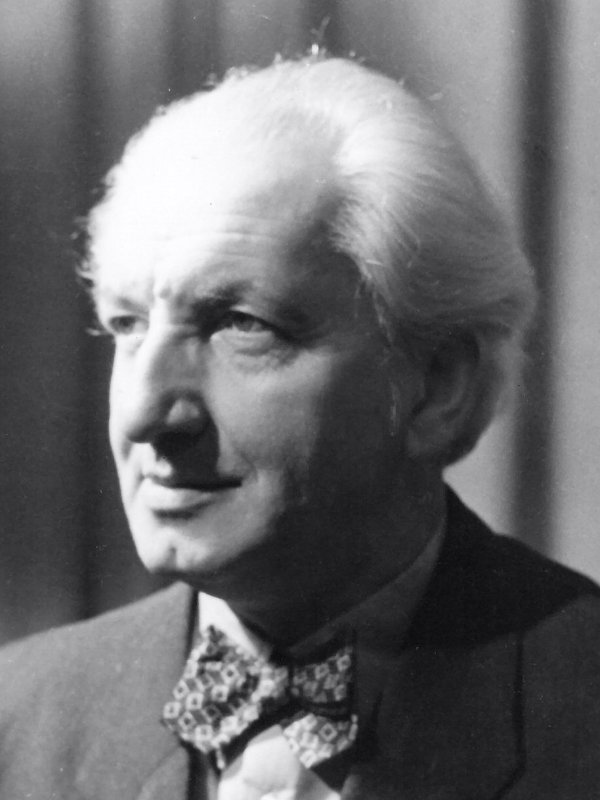
- Born: 12 February 1897; Fryšták, Moravia, Austria-Hungary
- Died: 1 April 1958 (aged 61); Brno, Czechoslovakia
- Education: Brno Conservatory
- Occupations: Conductor, pianist, composer

Břetislav Bakala (12 February 1897 – 1 April 1958) was a Czech conductor, pianist, and composer. His career was centred on Brno and he was particularly associated with the music of Leoš Janáček.

== Life and career ==
Bakala was born at Fryšták, Moravia, Austria-Hungary. He studied conducting at the Brno Conservatory with František Neumann, and composition with Leoš Janáček at the organ school. In 1922 he continued his studies at the Master school at the Conservatory with Vilém Kurz. From 1920 to 1925 and from 1929 to 1931 he worked as a conductor of the National Theatre in Brno, making his conducting debut in Orfeo ed Euridice.

Bakala discovered Janáček The Diary of One Who Disappeared in the composer's trunk in 1921 and first performed it (taking the piano part) in April that year.

On 31 January 1925 he conducted the premiere of Bohuslav Martinů's ballet Kdo je na světě nejmocnější? (Who is the Most Powerful in the World?) in Brno. From 1925 to 1926 he worked for a short time as an organist in Philadelphia in the United States, acting also as accompanist to Hans Kindler, with whom he had already successfully toured in Europe.

From 1926 he became a pianist and conductor of the Czech Radio Orchestra in Brno, and on the death of Neumann in 1929 became principal conductor of the Brno Opera. In 1936 Bakala was appointed conductor of the Vach Choir of Moravian Women Teachers. He took the Brno Radio Symphony Orchestra on tour to Russia and Latvia in 1937.

In 1951 he began teaching at the newly founded Janáček Academy of Music and Performing Arts in Brno. He was appointed as director and chief conductor of the Brno Philharmonic Orchestra in 1956. During the mid-1950s Bakala became one of the few conductors to champion Martinů's music in his homeland.

Bakala's main interest was concentrated on the works of Janáček. In 1921 he staged the premiere of The Diary of One Who Disappeared, in 1930 he conducted the premiere of the opera Z mrtvého domu in Brno. He revised this opera in co-operation with Osvald Chlubna. He also studied Janáček's seldom performed operas The Beginning of a Romance (1931) and Osud (1934). He made the piano reductions of his works including the 2nd movement of the Piano Sonata 1.X.1905. He edited the arrangements of Moravian folk songs. His wife, soprano Marie Bakalová-Šíšová was a member of the Brno Opera as well as a concert singer.

Charles Mackerras described Bakala's conducting of Janáček's music as "a great milestone" in the history of interpretation of the composer, citing in particular an unissued Brno Radio broadcast of The Makropoulos Case.

== Recordings ==
His recordings include the Glagolitic Mass, Sinfonietta and Lachian Dances by Janáček as well as Igor Stravinsky's Feu d'artifice, Cyrano de Bergerac by Josef Bohuslav Foerster, and Otakar Ostrčil's symphonic poem Summer. During a visit of the Brno State Philharmonic Orchestra to Warsaw in 1956 Polski Nagrania made the first LP recording of Martinů's 3rd Symphony with Bakala conducting. With the Vach Women's Choir he recorded Kašpar Rucký, while his wife Marie Bakalová features in Dvořák's The Cunning Peasant and in Říkadla. Among rarer examples of 20th century music, Bakala set down recordings of Novák's Serenade in D, Petrželka's Pastoral Sinfonietta, Václav Kaprál's Lullabies, Vítězslava Kaprálová's Military Sinfonietta and the ballet suite The Spectre's Bride by Jan Novák. The Brno Radio Archive contains further examples of Bakala's work.

== Compositions ==
Břetislav Bakala's small number of compositions are influenced by Vítězslav Novák and Janáček. They include a cello sonata, string quartet, Scherzo for orchestra, Christmas Lullaby, as well as arrangements of Janáček mentioned above.
