= Mahen Theatre =

- Mahenovo divadlo
- Deutsches Stadttheater
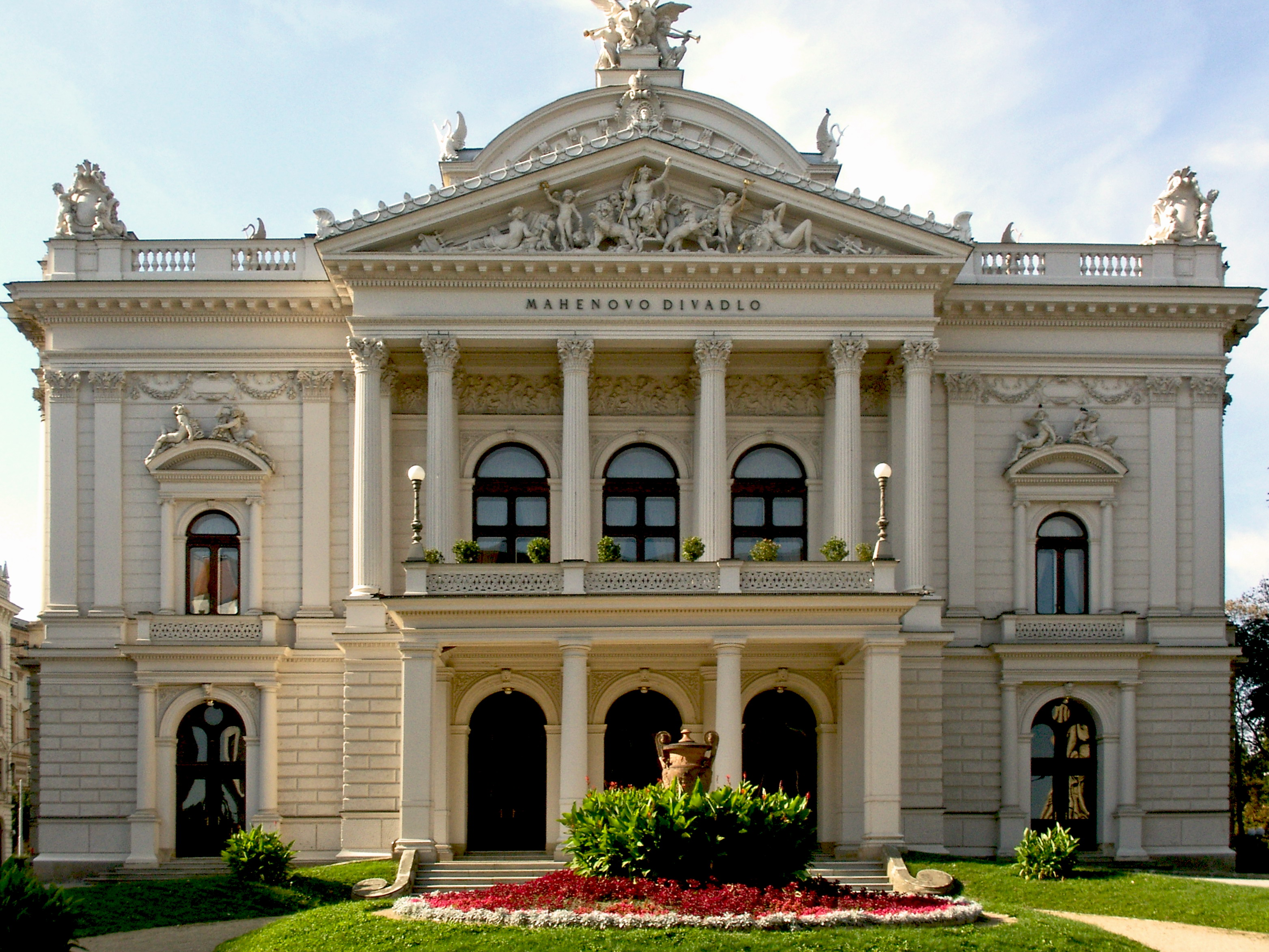
- Façade of the theatre
- Interactive map of Mahen Theatre
- Address: Malinovského náměstí 1 Brno; Czech Republic
- Coordinates: 49°11′47″N 16°36′47″E

Construction
- Opened: 1882

Website
- Official website

Mahen Theatre (Czech: Mahenovo divadlo) is a Czech theatre situated in the city of Brno. Mahen Theatre, built as German Deutsches Stadttheater in 1882, was one of the first public buildings in the world lit entirely by electric light. It was built in a combination of Neo-Renaissance, Neo-Baroque and Neoclassical architectural styles.

== History ==
The city theatre Reduta in Brno burned down in 1870, and the city council decided to build a new theatre building within a short time period. Thanks to the efforts of then mayor Gustav Winterholler, the decision was taken to build a bigger and better theatre at the place of Obstplatz (today's Malinovský square). The commission was assigned to the renowned Vienna architectural studio Fellner and Helmer. The studio was specialized in projects of theatre buildings. Around 1880, their modern type of theatre building was considered a model.

The founding stone was laid on 18 July 1881. The construction went smoothly, taking only 16 months from start to opening of the theatre. During the construction it was necessary to change the building's inner disposition several times. The main reason for this was the devastating fires which were affecting European theatres at the time. In March 1881, a fire in the Théâtre Royal in Nice killed almost 200 people. In August 1881, a fire destroyed the copper dome, the auditorium and stage of the National Theatre in Prague. The same year, another fire in Ringtheater in Vienna killed at least 384. The builders of the new theatre in Brno decided to take action in order to avoid similar incidents. New exits and additional side stairways were included in the plans. However, the most important decision was to replace the proposed gas lighting with a new invention: the electric light. In the middle of 1881, Brno city council negotiated a contract with the Edison Electric Light Company. The plans were designed by Thomas Edison himself, and the project was constructed by French and Austrian manufacturers, under the supervision of Edison's assistant Francis Jehl. The power station had to be built in a distant place, almost 300m away from the theatre, to ensure noise minimization. Amongst other things, the equipment of the power station consisted of four large dynamos imported from New York.

Thomas Edison wasn't present at the installation of the device, he visited Brno only 25 years later.

The theatre was opened on 14 November 1882 with the festive overture Consecration of the House by Ludwig van Beethoven. The opening celebration continued with the play "U paní Bruny", written by the German director of the theatre, Adolf Franckel, and ended with Goethe's Egmont.

Initially, Mahen Theatre was a German opera house, and it was called Deutsches Stadttheater (German City Theatre). In 1918, following World War I, it passed into the hands of the newly founded Czechoslovak state. It was renamed Divadlo na Hradbách (Theatre on the City Walls) and the first dramatical adviser became the novelist and playwright Jiří Mahen, after whom the theatre has been named since 1965.

In 1936, the theatre was largely reconstructed by the company Kolben - Daněk. Thanks to the reconstruction, it became one of the most modern theatre buildings in Czechoslovakia.

Today's Mahen Theatre served mainly as an opera house, until the building of Janáček Theatre in 1965. Five of the late operas by Leoš Janáček were premiered here, as well as the ballet Romeo and Juliet by Sergei Prokofiev. Since 1965, the theatre has served as the home stage of the dramatical ensemble of the National Theatre in Brno.

Parts of the original wiring are displayed in the foyer of the theatre (as of 2009). Mahen Theatre was proclaimed as one of the National Technical Monuments of the Czech Republic.

== Notable premieres ==
- Káťa Kabanová (Leoš Janáček) (1922)
- The Cunning Little Vixen (Leoš Janáček) (1924)
- The Makropulos Affair (Leoš Janáček) (1926)
- From the House of the Dead (Leoš Janáček) (1930)
- Romeo and Juliet (Sergei Prokofiev) (1938)
- Destiny (Leoš Janáček) (1958)
