= Taras Bulba (rhapsody) =

Composition by Leoš Janáček

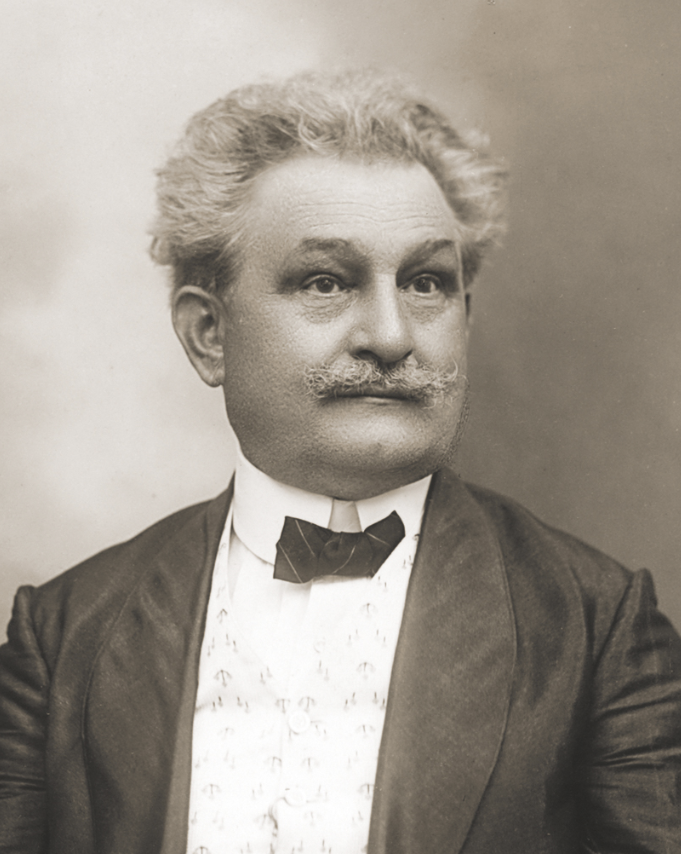
Leoš Janáček in 1914

Taras Bulba is a rhapsody for orchestra by the Czech composer Leoš Janáček. It was composed between 1915 and 1918 and is one of the most famous of Janáček's works. It is based on the novel by Nikolai Gogol.

The first version of the work was finished on 2 July 1915, but Janáček later revised it and made substantial changes. The second, almost complete, version was finished on 29 March 1918. Taras Bulba was premiered at the National Theatre in Brno on 9 October 1921, conducted by František Neumann. The composition was dedicated to "our army, the armed protector of our nation". It was published by Hudební matice in 1924 in piano duet arrangement made by Břetislav Bakala. In 1927 the full score was published with further changes. Janáček described the piece as a "rhapsody" and chose three episodes from Gogol's story to portray in this programmatic work.

== Music ==
The music is scored for piccolo (doubling 3rd flute), 2 flutes, 2 oboes, cor anglais, 2 clarinets (1st doubling E♭ clarinet), 2 bassoons, contrabassoon (doubling 3rd bassoon), 4 horns, 3 trumpets, 3 trombones, tuba, percussion (timpani, snare drum, suspended cymbal played with snare drum sticks, triangle, and bells), harp, organ, and strings.

The music is in three movements:

1. The Death of Andrei
2. The Death of Ostap
3. The Prophecy and Death of Taras Bulba

The first movement, The Death of Andrei, focuses on the Cossack Taras Bulba's younger son, who falls in love with the daughter of a Polish general. The opening is a passionate episode between the lovers with solos by English horn, violin, and oboe. There are occasional hints of darkness throughout, and eventually the music grows more turbulent, showing a battle between the two armies: angry trombone barks, tolling bells, and triumphant trumpet calls. Andrei fights on the side of the Poles, but when his father nears him in the battle, he realizes his treachery, and lowers his head to be killed by Taras Bulba himself. In the end, there is a brief reminiscence of the love music.

The second movement, The Death of Ostap, focuses on Taras Bulba's older son, who is overcome with grief by Andrei's death. He is captured by the Poles during the battle and hauled off to Warsaw for torture and execution. Taras Bulba sneaks into Warsaw in disguise, and at the moment of Ostap's death, he forgets where he is and calls out to his son. Much of the music is taken up with a kind of inexorable, limping march. In the end there is a wild mazurka as the Poles dance in triumph. Taras Bulba is personified by dark trombone statements, and Ostap's last anguished cry is played by high clarinet. (There are clear parallels to two earlier orchestral execution scenes: in Berlioz's Symphonie fantastique and Richard Strauss's Till Eulenspiegel's Merry Pranks.)

In the final movement, The Prophecy and Death of Taras Bulba, the Cossacks fight madly throughout Poland to avenge Ostap. Taras Bulba is eventually captured in a battle on the Dnieper River, but before he is burned to death by the Polish army, he issues a defiant prophecy: "Do you think that there is anything in the world that a Cossack fears? Wait; the time will come when you shall learn what the orthodox Russian faith is! Already the people sense it far and near. A Tsar shall arise from Russian soil, and there shall not be a power in the world which shall not submit to him!" The opening music is filled with battle music and war-cries by Taras Bulba—the trombones again—until a quiet passage depicting his capture. The prophecy itself is a stirring passage for brass and organ, culminating in the ringing of bells and a triumphant epilogue. Just before the bells enter, there is a Moravian cadence at bar 169.
