= The Cunning Little Vixen =

Opera by Leoš Janáček

- Opera by Leoš Janáček
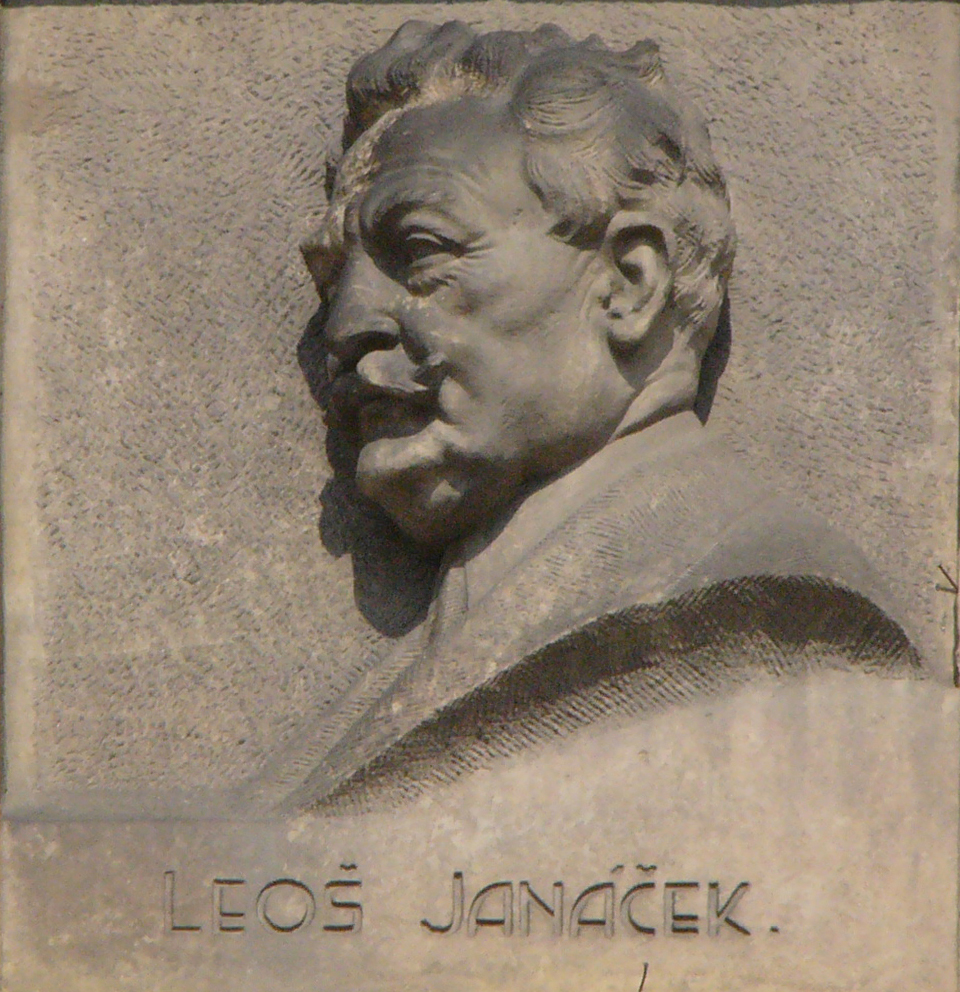
- Relief of the composer by Julius Pelikán
- Native title: Czech: Příhody lišky Bystroušky
- Librettist: Leoš Janáček
- Language: Czech
- Based on: serialized novella by Rudolf Těsnohlídek and Stanislav Lolek
- Premiere: 6 November 1924; National Theatre Brno

The Cunning Little Vixen (original title Příhody lišky Bystroušky or Tales of Vixen Sharp-Ears in English) is a three-act Czech-language opera by Leoš Janáček completed in 1923 to a libretto the composer himself adapted from a novella by Rudolf Těsnohlídek.

== Name ==
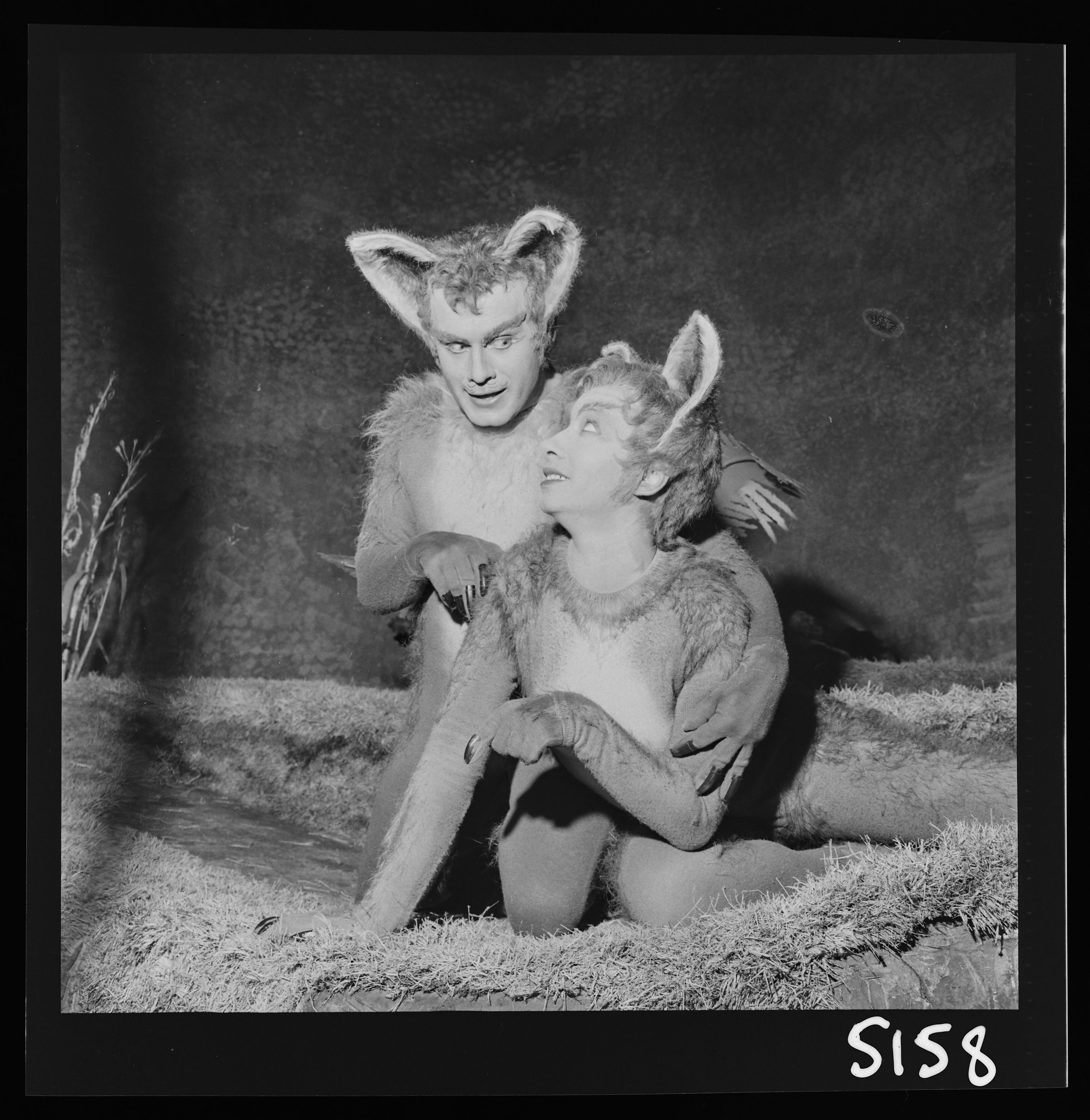
Scene from a 1957 production in Paris

The opera's libretto was adapted by the composer from a 1920 serialized novella, Liška Bystrouška, by Rudolf Těsnohlídek, which was first published in the newspaper Lidové noviny (with illustrations by Stanislav Lolek). For the title of the opera, Příhody means tales; lišky is the genitive of vixen. Bystroušky, still genitive, is the pun sharp, having the double meaning of pointed, like fox ears, and clever. The opera first became familiar outside Czechoslovakia in a 1927 German adaptation by Max Brod who provided the new name Das schlaue Füchslein, by which Germans still know it and which in English means The Cunning Little Vixen.

== Composition ==
When Janáček discovered Těsnohlídek's comic-strip-inspired story and decided to turn it into an opera, in 1921, he began work by meeting with the author and studying the animals. With this understanding of the characters involved, his own 70 years of life experience, and an undying, unrequited love for the much younger, married Kamila Stösslová, he began work on the opera. He transformed the originally comedic cartoon into a philosophical reflection on the cycle of life by ending with the death of the titular Vixen; as with other operas by elderly composers, this one depicts life leading to a return to simplicity. Work was completed in 1923 and the first edition was published the next year in Vienna by Universal Edition. The premiere took place on 6 November 1924 in National Theatre Brno conducted by František Neumann, with Ota Zítek as director and Eduard Milén as stage designer.

The opera incorporates Moravian folk music and rhythms as it recounts the life of a clever (alternative reading: sharp-eared) fox and accompanying wildlife, as well as a few humans, and their small adventures while traversing their lifecycles. Described as a comic opera, it has nonetheless been noted to contain a serious theme. Interpretations of the work remain varied, ranging from children's entertainment to tragedy.

== Performance history ==
The first non-Czech performance took place in Mainz, Germany, in 1927 in an adaptation by Max Brod under the title Das schlaue Füchslein. Brod described the opera as a "dream of the eternity of nature and love-lust", but his version substantially changed the story-line. It was not successful. In 1956 Walter Felsenstein created a performing version closer to the original, which was successfully performed at the Komische Oper in Berlin. In 1965, Felsenstein made this a Deutscher Fernsehfunk movie with Irmgard Arnold in the title role, but retaining Brod's Das schlaue Füchslein title.

The opera received its Italian premiere at La Scala in 1958 with Mariella Adani in the title role. The work was first staged in England in 1961 by the Sadler's Wells Opera Company (now the English National Opera) with June Bronhill in the title, albeit with a tenor Fox (Kevin Miller); the director was Colin Graham, with conductor Colin Davis, and scenery and costume designs by Barry Kay. A production by David Pountney was mounted by the three UK national companies in the 1980s, first being seen with Scottish Opera at the 1980 Edinburgh Festival, then Welsh National Opera in London the following year and finally with English National Opera in June 1988; nearly 40 years on Pountney supervised a revival by Welsh National Opera in Cardiff and on tour. In 1981, the New York City Opera mounted a production in English based on images created by Maurice Sendak and conducted by Michael Tilson Thomas in his company debut. It starred soprano Gianna Rolandi as Vixen Sharp-Ears and baritone Richard Cross as the Forester. Glyndebourne Festival Opera staged it in 2012, directed by Melly Still, and a revival was included in the Glyndebourne Festival for 2016 with Christopher Purves as the Forester and Elena Tsallagova as the Vixen, conductor Jakub Hrůša and the London Philharmonic Orchestra. In May 2014 the Cleveland Orchestra, conducted by Franz Welser-Möst, performed an innovative version directed by Yuval Sharon. This production returned the opera to its roots by utilizing animation and hand drawn video sets by the artists Bill Barminski and Christopher Louie of Walter Robot Studios. The production featured the use of hole-in-the-wall carnival cutouts to place the singers' heads on the animated bodies of the animal characters. Cleveland Orchestra's production was shown again at Detroit Opera as their 2023–2024 season closer, directed by Yuval Sharon and conducted by Roberto Kalb.

In 2023, the opera was staged in São Paulo, directed by Ira Levin and production by André Heller-Lopes, taking a surrealistic approach.

== Roles ==
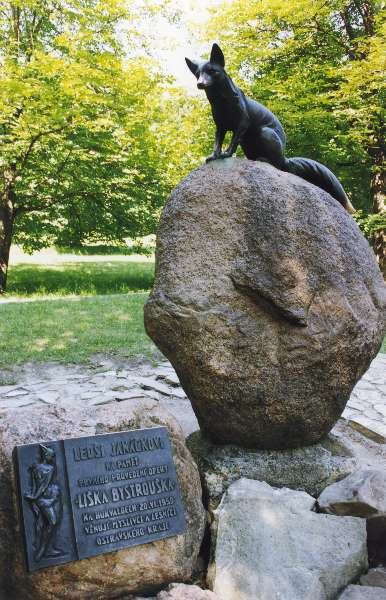
Monument of Bystrouška, Janáček's opera The Cunning Little Vixen at Hukvaldy, Janáček's hometown

Role	Voice type	Premiere cast, 6 November 1924 (Conductor: František Neumann)
Sharp-Ears (Bystrouška) the Vixen	soprano	Hana Hrdličková-Zavřelová
Gold-Stripe (Zlatohřbítek) the Fox	soprano or mezzo-soprano	Božena Snopková
Forester (Revírník)	baritone	Arnold Flögl
Parson	bass	
Schoolmaster	tenor	Antonín Pelc
Harašta, a poultry dealer	bass	Ferdinand Pour
Supporting roles:
Forester's wife	contralto	
Lapák, a dog	mezzo-soprano	Marta Dobruská
Chocholka, a hen	soprano	Vlasta Kubiková
Rooster	soprano	
Bit roles:
Pepík, Forester's grandson	soprano	Božena Polaková
Frantík, Pepík's friend	soprano	Milada Rabasová
Pásek, an innkeeper	tenor	Bedřich Zavadil
Mrs. Páskova, Pásek's wife	soprano	Jelena Jezicová
Young Vixen Bystrouška	child soprano	
Cricket	child soprano	
Young Frog (Skokánek)	child soprano	
Grasshopper	child soprano	
Jay	soprano	
Owl	contralto	
Woodpecker	contralto	
Mosquito	tenor	
Badger	bass	
Chorus roles:
Hens	women's chorus (SA)	
Forest Creatures	women's chorus (SA)	
Voice of the Forest	mixed chorus (SAATTBB)	
Fox Cubs	[children's] chorus	
Ballet roles:
Blue Dragonfly, Midges, Apparition of the Vixen as a girl, Hedgehog, Squirrels, a Young Vixen, Forest Creatures

According to instructions in the score, four pairs of roles may be performed by the same singer: Parson/Badger, Schoolmaster/Mosquito, Forester's Wife/Owl, and Rooster/Jay. Janáček later required that Lapák, Rooster, and Chocholka be sung by "girls approximately fifteen years old."

== Synopsis ==
=== Act 1 ===
In the forest, the animals and insects are playing and dancing. The forester enters and lies down against a tree for a nap. A curious vixen cub (often sung by a young girl), inquisitively chases a frog right into the lap of the surprised forester who forcibly takes the vixen home as a pet. Time passes (in the form of an orchestral interlude) and we see the vixen, now grown up into a young adult (now a soprano) tied up in the forester's yard with the conservative old dachshund. Fed up with life in confinement, the vixen chews through her rope, attacks the rooster and hen, kills the other chickens, jumps over the fence and runs off to freedom.

=== Act 2 ===
The vixen takes over a badger's home and kicks him out. At the inn, the parson, the forester, and the schoolmaster drink and talk about their mutual infatuation with the gypsy girl Terynka. The drunken schoolmaster leaves the inn and mistakes a sunflower behind which the vixen is hiding for Terynka, professing his devotion to her. The forester, also on his way home, sees the vixen and fires two shots at her, sending her running. Later, the vixen, coming into her adulthood, meets a charming male fox (sung by a woman), and they retire to the badger's home. An unexpected pregnancy and a forest full of gossipy creatures necessitate their marriage.

=== Act 3 ===
The poacher Harašta is engaged to Terynka and is out hunting in preparation for their marriage. He sets a fox trap, which the numerous fox and vixen cubs mock. Harašta, watching from a distance, shoots and kills the vixen, sending her children running. At Harašta's wedding, the forester sees the vixen's fur, which Harašta gave to Terynka as a wedding present, and flees to the forest to reflect. He returns to the place where he met the vixen, and sits at the tree, grieving the loss of both the vixen and Terynka. His grief grows until, just as in the beginning of the opera, a frog unexpectedly jumps in his lap, the grandson of the one who did so in Act 1. This reassurance of the cycle of death bringing new life gives his heart a deep peace.

== Music ==
Apart from The Excursions of Mr. Brouček, this is Janáček's lightest opera, and, despite the titular vixen's death at the end of the work, it stands in contrast to the often brutally serious nature of operas such as Jenůfa and Káťa Kabanová. In The Cunning Little Vixen, the composer moved away from the more conversational style of previous and subsequent operas in favor of a more folk-like style, and wove into its fabric some of his most experimental opera concepts (ballet, mime, and orchestral interludes).

Janáček based The Cunning Little Vixen's tonality on modes (similarly to much output during his last decade), expanding the music's harmonic range through the utilisation of the seventh and ninth chords. The composition makes frequent use of folk-influenced rhythms and "sčasovka" (personally-coined term for a short motif), while it has been noted to contain similarities to the music of French composer Claude Debussy.

At Janáček's request, the final scene from The Cunning Little Vixen was performed at his funeral in 1928.

== Recordings ==
- 1970: Prague National Theatre Chorus and Orchestra/Bohumil Gregor (Supraphon SU 3071-2612, OCLC 49985895)
- 1981: Wiener Staatsopernchor & Philharmoniker/Charles Mackerras, recorded 1981 (Decca 417 129–2)
- 1991: Royal Opera House Chorus and Orchestra/Simon Rattle, recorded 1991 (Chandos 3101(2), sung in English)
- 1995: Orchestre de Paris/Charles Mackerras, video recorded 1995 (Kultur D4544, OCLC 698051148; Medici Arts, OCLC 698051148)
- 2009 (video): Orchestra and Chorus of the Maggio Musicale/Seiji Ozawa (Arthaus Musik, OCLC 881636114)
- 2020: London Symphony Orchestra/Simon Rattle, 2020 (LSO Live, LSO0850)

== Arrangements ==
- Orchestral suite of the opera by Václav Talich, performed by Czech Philharmonic Orchestra, conductor Václav Talich
- Orchestral suite of the opera by Václav Talich, performed by Boston Symphony Orchestra, conductor Erich Leinsdorf
- Orchestral suite of the opera by Václav Talich, performed by Czech Philharmonic Orchestra, conductor Charles Mackerras
- Entr'actes from the opera, arrangement by František Jílek, performed by Brno Philharmonic Orchestra, conductor Jakub Hrůša
- Music from the opera for brass quintet, arrangement by František Jílek, performed by Brno Brass Quintet, ar Vlastimil Bialas
- Cut version of the opera for an animated film, arrangement by Kent Nagano, in English, texted Geoff Dunbar, performed by soloists, Berlin German Symphony Orchestra, conductor Kent Nagano

== Films ==
- In 1965, Walter Felsenstein directed a filmed version in German (Das schlaue Füchslein).
- In 1990, the BBC broadcast the opera from the Royal Opera House, conducted by Simon Rattle with Lillian Watson as the vixen, Diana Montague as the fox and Thomas Allen as the forester. The broadcast was directed by Barrie Gavin.
- Certain elements were taken from the 1991 Polish-German film Lisiczka, which was mainly an adaptation of Těsnohlídek's original novella.
- In 2003, an animated version was produced by the BBC.

== Adaptations ==
Ursula Dubosarsky's 2018 novel for children, Brindabella, is based on Rudolf Těsnohlídek's Vixen Sharp Ears, the source story of the Cunning Little Vixen, relocated in the Australian bush, with the role of the Vixen played by a kangaroo.
