= From the House of the Dead =

Opera by Leoš Janáček

- Opera by Leoš Janáček
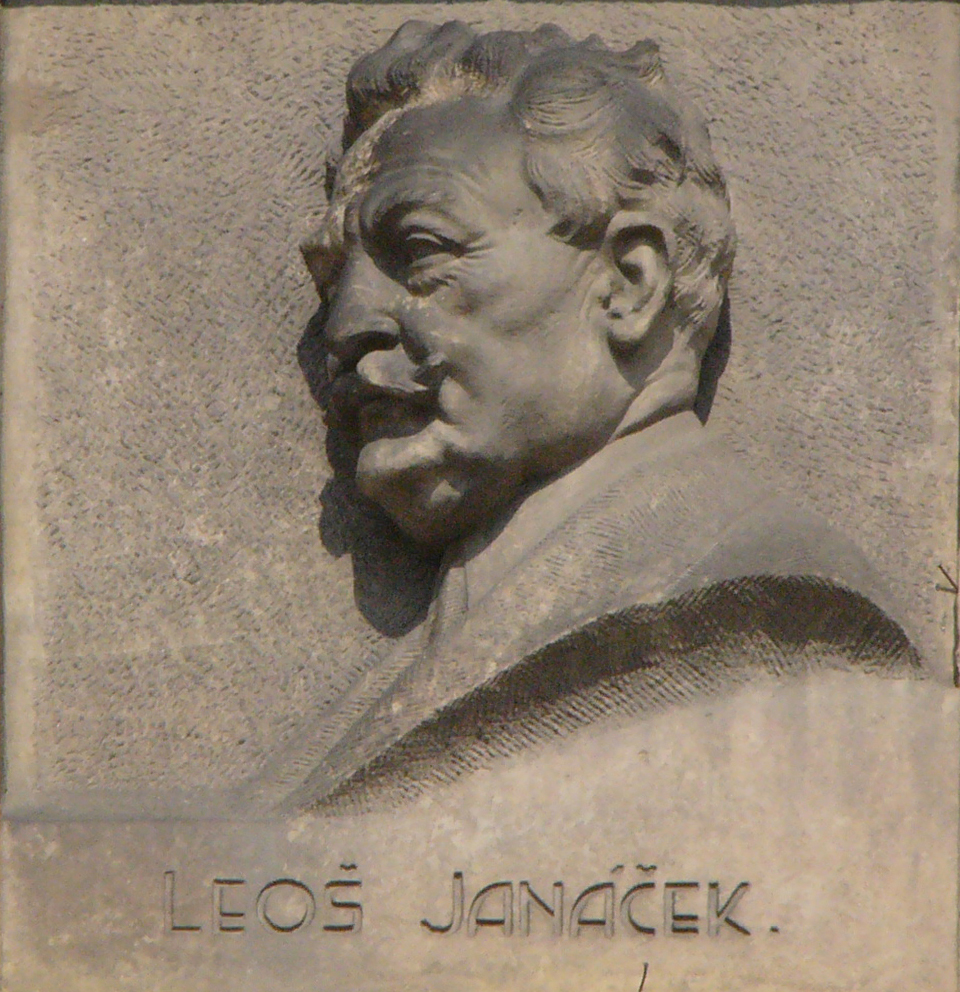
- Relief portrait of the composer by Julius Pelikán
- Native title: Z mrtvého domu
- Librettist: Leoš Janáček
- Language: Czech
- Based on: The House of the Dead by Fyodor Dostoevsky
- Premiere: 12 April 1930; National Theatre Brno

From the House of the Dead (Czech: Z mrtvého domu) is an opera in three acts by Leoš Janáček. The libretto was translated and adapted by the composer from the 1862 novel by Fyodor Dostoevsky. It was the composer's last opera, premiered on 12 April 1930 at the National Theatre Brno, two years after his death. The United States stage premiere of the work took place at Lincoln Center in 1989 when the New York City Opera mounted a production led by conductor Christopher Keene with a cast starring Harlan Foss as Alexandr Petrovič Gorjančikov, John Absalom as Filka Morozov, Jon Garrison as Skuratov, and John Lankston as Šapkin.

== Composition history ==
Janáček worked on this opera from February 1927 to 8 June 1928, knowing that it would be his last, and for it he broke away from the habit he had developed of creating characters modeled on his love interest Kamila Stösslová, although the themes of loneliness and isolation can clearly be seen as a response to her indifference to his feelings. There is only one female character, and the setting, a Siberian prison, presents a large ensemble cast instead of one or several prominent leads. There is no narrative to the work as a whole, but individual characters narrate episodes in their lives, and there is a play-within-a-play in act 2.

From the House of the Dead was virtually finished when Janáček died. Two of his students, believing the orchestration was incomplete, "filled out" large portions of the score and adapted the ending to be more optimistic in tone. In addition to the work of Břetislav Bakala and Osvald Chlubna, Otakar Zítek made changes to the text and sequence of events in the opera. Decades later, a version closer to the composer's intentions superseded that version, and it is the one most often heard today. Some productions, however, still use the earlier version's ending to lessen the bleakness of the story.

The opera requires a vast orchestra, including chains as a percussion instrument to evoke the sound of the prisoners. The words of prisoners' songs from the Dostoevsky novel are used in full or in part by Janáček.

An arrangement in the form of a suite of the opera by conductor František Jílek has been performed by the Brno Philharmonic.

One critic has suggested that by pursuing extreme high and low sonorities in this opera, Janáček was cutting out its heart, the orchestral mid range, in an attempt to convey human heartlessness.

== Roles ==
Roles, voice types, premiere cast
Role	Voice type	Premiere cast, 12 April 1930 (Conductor: Břetislav Bakala)
Alexandr Petrovič Gorjančikov	baritone	Vlastimil Šíma
Aljeja, a young Tartar	mezzo-soprano	Božena Žlábková
Luka Kuzmič (Filka Morozov)	tenor	Emil Olšovský
Skuratov	tenor	Antonín Pelz / Pelc
Šiškov	baritone	Géza Fischer / Fišer
Prison Governor	baritone	Leonid Pribytkov
Big Prisoner/Nikita	tenor	
Small Prisoner	baritone	Jaroslav Čihák
Prisoner with the eagle	tenor	Václav Šindler
First Guard	tenor	
Second Guard	baritone	
Elderly Prisoner	tenor	Josef Žižka
Voice (offstage)	tenor	
Cook (a prisoner)	baritone	Vladimír Jedenáctík
Priest	baritone	Adolf Brunner
Čekunov	bass	Vladimír Jedenáctík
Drunk Prisoner	tenor	Antonín Pelz / Pelc
Šapkin	tenor	Valentin Šindler
Blacksmith (a prisoner)	baritone	Václav Fiala
Prisoner/Kedril	tenor	Jaroslav Suchánek
Prisoner/Don Juan/The Brahmin	bass	Pavel Jerner / Ježek
Young Prisoner	tenor	Vladimír Skalický
Prostitute	mezzo-soprano	Jožka Mattesová
Čerevin	tenor	
Male chorus: prisoners (taking silent parts in act 2 plays); guests, prison guards (silent)

== Synopsis ==
=== Act 1 ===
A Siberian prison camp on a winter morning

The prisoners get up, two get into a dispute, as the rumour is spread that a nobleman will be the new arrival ("Přivednou dnes pána"). He is Alexandr Petrovitch Goryantchikov, a political prisoner. The prison governor interrogates him and orders him to be flogged ("Jak tě nazývají"). The prisoners have found a wounded eagle and tease the bird until the guards order them to their work ("Zvíře! Nedá se!"). The prisoners lament their fate ("Neuvidí oko již"); one of them, Skuratov, recalls his previous life in Moscow ("Já mlada na hodech byla"). Another, Luka Kuzmitch, tells how he incited a rebellion and killed an officer in his first prison camp ("Aljeja, podávej nitku"). Just as he describes his own flogging, Goryantchikov is dragged in, half dead ("Aljeja! Niti!").

=== Act 2 ===
Six months later, at the Irtysh river

Goryantchikov has befriended the young Tartar Alyeya, asks him about his family and offers to teach him to read and write ("Milý, milý Aljeja"). The prisoners finish work as a holiday begins and a priest blesses the food and the river ("Alexandr Petrovič, bude prazdnik"). Skuratov tells his story: He loved a German girl, Luisa, but when she was to be married to an old relative, Skuratov shot the groom ("Jaj, já pustý zbytečný člověk" – "Přešel den, druhý, třetí"). For the holiday, the prisoners stage a play about Don Juan and Kedril ("Dnes bude můj poslední den") and the pantomime about a beautiful, but unfaithful miller's wife ("Pantomima o pěkné mlynářce"). After the play, a prisoner tries to provoke Goryantchikov, as the nobleman has the means to drink tea even in prison ("Pěkně hráli, co?"). Alyeya gets injured.

=== Act 3 ===
The prison hospital

Goryantchikov looks after Alyeya, who is happy that he now knows how to read and write ("Isak, prorok boží"). Luka lies dying of tuberculosis and insults Tchekunov for his servile mannerism towards Goryantchikov. Shapkin tells the story of his arrest as a vagrant and how an officer pulled his ear ("Ó, bratři! Ta bolest, to nic!"). Skuratov has gone mad. During the night, Shishkov tells his story, interrupted by the impatient questions of Tcherevin ("Má dět'átka milá"). A rich merchant had a daughter, Akulka, whom a friend of Shishkov's, one Filka Morozov, claimed to have dishonoured ("Ty, pravil Filka" – "A Filka křičí"). She was married to Shishkov who found out that she was a virgin ("A já byl, bratříčku, až do do svatby zpit"). When he discovered that she still loved Filka, Shishkov killed her ("Na druhý den"). Just then, Luka dies and Shishkov recognises him as Filka. A guard fetches Goryantchikov.

Second scene. A drunk prison governor apologises to Goryantchikov for the whipping and tells him that he has been pardoned and is free ("Petrovičí, já jsem tě urazil"). The prisoners release the healed eagle before the guard orders them back to work.

== Recordings ==
- Supraphon, 1964: Václav Bednár, Jaroslav Horácek, Ivo Žídek, Beno Blachut, Přemysl Kočí; Prague National Theatre Orchestra & Chorus, Bohumil Gregor, conductor
- Decca, 1979: Dalibor Jedlicka, Jiří Zahradníček, Ivo Žídek, Václav Zitek, Vienna Philharmonic; Sir Charles Mackerras, conductor (recording of original version)
- Supraphon, 1979: Richard Novák, Vilém Přibyl, Jaroslav Horácek, Ivo Žídek, Jaroslav Soucek; Czech Philharmonic Chorus and Orchestra; Václav Neumann, conductor
- Deutsche Grammophon (DVD), 2007: Olaf Bär, Štefan Margita, John Mark Ainsley, Gerd Grochowski; Arnold Schoenberg Choir; Mahler Chamber Orchestra; Pierre Boulez, conductor; Patrice Chéreau, stage director
