= Bohumil Gregor =

Czech conductor (1926–2005)

Bohumil Gregor (Prague, 14 July 1926 – 4 November 2005) was a Czech conductor.

Gregor studied double bass at the Prague Conservatory. He made his conducting debut on October 26, 1947, at the Divadlo 5. května (Theatre of the Fifth of May, now the Prague State Opera). He conducted at the State Theatre in Brno (1949–1951), the National Theatre in Prague (1955–1958 and 1962–1966), the State Theatre in Ostrava (1958–1962), the Royal Swedish Opera in Stockholm (1966–1969), the State Opera in Hamburg (1969–1972), De Nederlandse Opera in Amsterdam (from 1972), and also in San Francisco, Philadelphia and Washington. In 1999, he returned to the Prague State Opera where he worked as musical director until 2002.

Gregor died in the city of his birth, where he had conducted his last performances of The Cunning Little Vixen.

== Selected discography ==
- Leoš Janáček: From the House of the Dead; Supraphon Music (1964)
- Leoš Janáček: The Makropulos Affair; Supraphon (1966)
- Josef Bayer: Královna Loutek (The fairy doll, ballet); Supraphon (1968)
- Leoš Janáček: Jenůfa highlights; Supraphon (1969)
- Leoš Janáček: Příhody lišky Bystroušky (Tales of Vixen Sharp-Ears); Supraphon (1972)
- Antonín Dvořák: Rusalka (1976), issued by Bella Voce in 1998
- Dittersdorf: 6 Sinfonies Exprimant - Les Metamorphoses d'Ovide, Prague Chamber Orchestra, recorded 1986–87; Supraphon
- Zemlinsky: Lyrische Symphonie (with Karan Armstrong, Ivan Kusnjer, Czech Philharmonic Orchestra), Supraphon, recorded December 1987 and April 1988
- Pavel Vranický: Two symphonies, in D major and C minor; Dvořák Chamber Orchestra: Supraphon (recorded 1988 and 1990)
- Antonín Dvořák: 3 Slavonic Rhapsodies, My Home, Symphonic Variations, A Hero's Song, Scherzo capriccioso; Czech Philharmonic, Supraphon 11 0378-2 (1989)
- George Frideric Handel: Water Music; Supraphon (1993)
- Leoš Janáček: The Cunning Little Vixen; Prague National Theatre Chorus and Orchestra, Supraphon SU 3071-2612 (2003)
- Antonín Dvořák: The Devil and Kate (2003) non-commercial live recording
