= The Diary of One Who Disappeared =

Song cycle written by Leoš Janáček

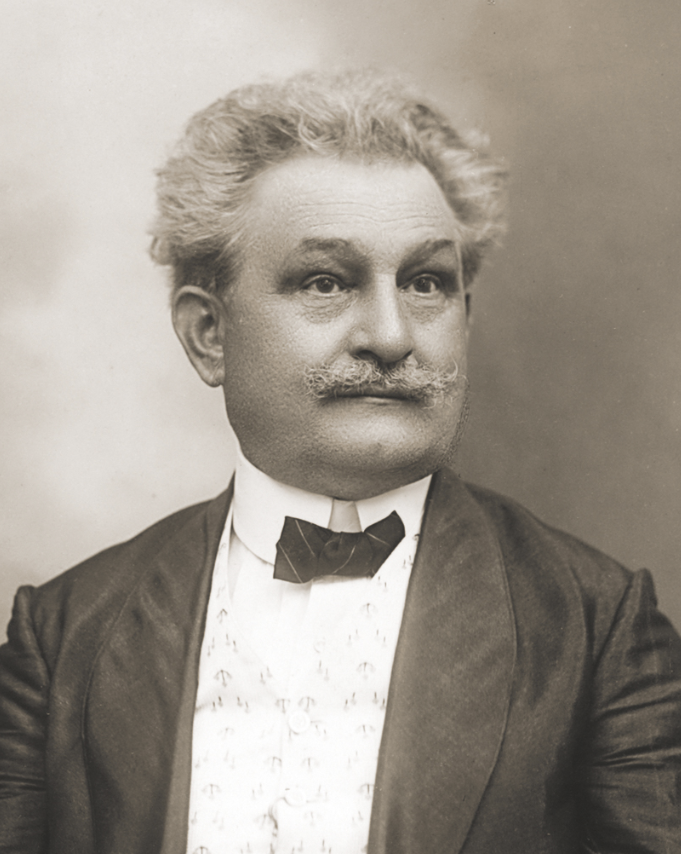
Leoš Janáček in 1914

Zápisník zmizelého, or (The) Diary of One Who Disappeared, is a half-hour Czech-language quasi-operatic song cycle for tenor, alto, three other women's voices and piano completed in 1919 by Leoš Janáček. Of its 22 sections, 18 are for tenor and piano alone; midway through, three sections involve the women, and these are followed by a commenting one for piano solo: an intermezzo erotico. The song cycle was premiered at the Reduta Theatre in Brno in 1921.

== Background ==
On May 14, 1916, the Lidové noviny newspaper published verses titled From the Pen of a Self-Taught Writer. This diary-in-poems tells the story of an unnamed village boy who falls in love with the "black gipsy girl" Zefka (Žofka) and decides to leave his family and village with her. The diary made a deep impression on Leoš Janáček, a cooperator on Lidové noviny at that time, and he decided to rework it into a song cycle.

== Text ==
The author of From the Pen of a Self-Taught Writer was unknown for decades, but in 1998 Dr. Jan Mikeska identified him as the Wallachian writer Ozef Kalda.

== Composition ==
Janáček created a song cycle in twenty-two brief sections with scenic demands. He worked on it in August 1917 and June 1919, completing it then. Modifications were made in December 1920. The composer created the work simultaneously with other compositions. Janáček was inspired by his own friend and late love Kamila Stösslová. He expressed his inclinations in letters to her, telling her about the character Zefka (Žofka): "And the black gipsy girl in my Diary of One Who Disappeared — she was you. That's why there's so much emotional fire in the work. So much fire that if we both caught on, we'd be turned into ashes. … And all through the work I thought of you! You were my Žofka. Žofka with a child in her arms, and he runs after her!"

== Premiere ==
The song cycle received its first performance in the small Reduta Theatre in the Moravian capital Brno on 18 April 1921 under the title Diary of One Who Disappeared and Was Never Heard of Again. This title would later be shortened by Janáček. The tenor part was performed by Karel Zavřel, the alto by Ludmila Kvapilová-Kudláčková, and the pianist was Janáček student Břetislav Bakala, also a conductor.

== Structure ==
The main female part was at first written for soprano and then lowered by the composer for alto. The piano part bears some Impressionistic features. The twenty-two brief sections are marked musically as follows:

- 1. Andante
- 2. Con moto
- 3. Andante
- 4. Andante
- 5. Adagio
- 6. Allegro
- 7. Con moto
- 8. Andante
- 9.
- 10. Un poco più mosso
- 11. Con moto
- 12.
- 13. Andante
- 14. Adagio
- 15. Allegro
- 16. Adagio
- 17. Recitativo
- 18. L'istesso tempo
- 19. Andante
- 20. Con moto
- 21. Meno mosso
- 22. Andante

== Arrangements ==
In 1943 the work was orchestrated by Ota Zítek and Václav Sedláček for a staged performance in Plzeň. A recording of this orchestration was made in 1987 by Philip Langridge, Brigitte Balleys and the Berlin Philharmonic under Claudio Abbado: DG 427 313–2. Otherwise there are these:

1. Arrangement suitable for: tenor, alto, three female voices and piano
  - arrangement for: an instrumental ensemble
  - arrangement by: Geert van Keulen
  - performed by: Soloists, Schönberg Ensemble, co Reinbert de Leeuw
2. Arrangement suitable for: tenor, alto, three female voices and piano
  - arrangement for: a chamber opera
  - arrangement by: Claude Berset
  - performed by: Soloists, pno Mireille Bellenot
3. Arrangement suitable for: tenor, alto, three female voices and piano
  - arrangement for: guitar
  - arrangement by: Steve Howe
  - performed by: Excerpts, gui Steve Howe

== Manuscript of Section XIII, the Piano Solo ==
In 2012 the German pianist Lars David Kellner recorded the first version of the piano solo (XIII), based on the composer's manuscript: LC 05699 CD.
