= Gabriela Beňačková =

Slovak lyric soprano

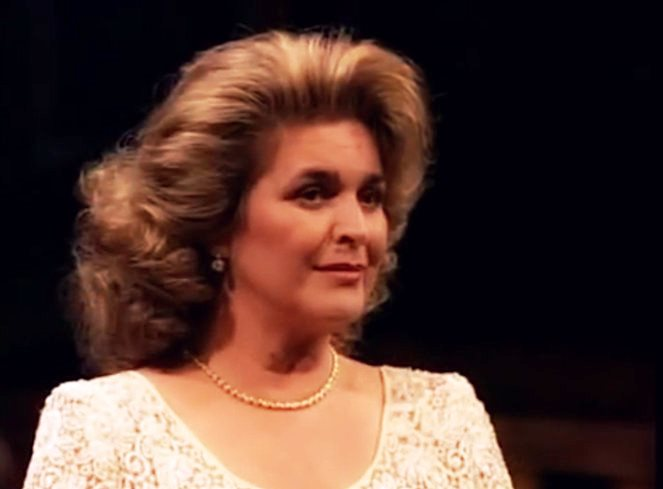
- Gabriela Beňačková at the Met gala, 1996
- Born: Bratislava, Czechoslovakia
- Occupation: Operatic soprano
- Years active: 1970–present

Gabriela Beňačková also Gabriela Beňačková-Čápová (born 25 March 1944 or 1947) is a Slovak lyric soprano.

== Life and career ==
Beňačková was born in Bratislava on 25 March in either 1944 or 1947. Her father Antonín was a lawyer, and her mother Elena was a housewife. She is the younger sister of television presenter Nora Beňačková. In her young age she had been involved in ballet lessons, children's choir of Czechoslovak Radio, and learned singing and piano at school.

Beňačková specializes in the music of her Slovak compatriots, particularly Eugen Suchoň, as well as Czech composers, notably Bedřich Smetana, Antonín Dvořák and Leoš Janáček. She is considered to be one of the greatest 'Jenůfa's' in Janáček's opera of the same name. Her Carnegie Hall performance, and subsequent Metropolitan Opera run with Leonie Rysanek, are considered to be legendary.

In 1981, Czechoslovak Television starred Ms Beňačková in a definitive version of Prodaná nevěsta (The Bartered Bride) by Bedřich Smetana, which has since become a popular DVD recording available in an all-regions format (2006). That recording teamed her with the tenor (fellow Slovak) Peter Dvorský as Jeník, and with bass Richard Novák as Kecal, and other popular singers. She completed her farewell recital tour in 2008.

She has made a number of recordings (including a beautiful recording in the title role of Rusalka by Dvořák, conducted by Václav Neumann), and has appeared in several filmed operas on DVD, as well as the feature film The Divine Emma, where she supplied the singing voice of the famous Czech soprano Emmy Destinn. Her voice can also be heard in the movie Driving Miss Daisy singing title role in Rusalka by Antonín Dvořák, and in Copycat singing Puccini's aria Vissi d'arte from the opera Tosca by Giacomo Puccini.

She appeared as Marguerite in the Vienna State Opera's production of Charles Gounod's Faust (1985), as well as Fidelio/Leonore in the Royal Opera House production of Fidelio by Ludwig van Beethoven (1991). Between 1991 and 1999 she had 39 appearances in New York's Metropolitan Opera, the last one as Desdemona in Otello by Giuseppe Verdi together with Plácido Domingo. In 2012, she sang the difficult role of the Comtesse de la Roche, in Die Soldaten, at the Salzburg Festival, a production now on DVD.

== Fraud indictment ==
In March 2026, Czech state prosecutors charged Beňačková with attempted fraud in connection with the estate of the late actress Slávka Budínová. According to the indictment, she and another woman induced an elderly and seriously ill heiress to make a 2019 will that disinherited the woman's sons. That will was later voided by a Czech court. If convicted, Beňačková faces up to ten years in prison.

== Recordings ==
- Leoš Janáček: Jenůfa - Gabriela Beňačková with Naděžda Kniplová, Vilém Přibyl, Vladimír Krejčík, Janáček Theatre in Brno, orchestra and chorus conducted by František Jílek (1977–1978) Supraphon CD SU 3869-2.
- Bedřich Smetana: The Bartered Bride - Gabriela Beňačková with Peter Dvorský (Jeník), Richard Novák (Kecal), Miroslav Kopp, Marie Veselá, Czech Philharmonic conducted by Zdeněk Košler, Supraphon DVD.
- Gabriela Beňačková From the Heart: Mikuláš Schneider-Trnavský Songs about Mother: If Only They Knew; Mother; If I Knew; Little Flower: Far and Wide; The Nightingale; A Lovely Dream; Student Period Songs: The Settler; The Bowed Rose; Your Shy Eyes; The Girl Is Being Married; From My Heart: The Withering Tree; The Cuckoo; Roses.

== Videography ==
- Boito, Mefistofele, Gabriela Beňačková (Margherita, Elena), Samuel Ramey (Mefistofele), Maurizio Arena (conductor), San Francisco Opera, Recorded in 1989, Arthaus Blu-Ray and DVD.
- James Levine's 25th Anniversary Metropolitan Opera Gala (1996), Deutsche Grammophon DVD, B0004602-09
