= Jenůfa =

Opera by Leoš Janáček

- Opera by Leoš Janáček
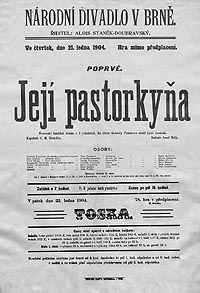
- Poster for the premiere, 1904
- Native title: Její pastorkyňa (Her Stepdaughter)
- Librettist: Janáček
- Language: Czech
- Based on: Její pastorkyňa by Gabriela Preissová
- Premiere: 21 January 1904; National Theatre, Brno

Její pastorkyňa (Her Stepdaughter; commonly known as Jenůfa) is an opera in three acts by Leoš Janáček to a Czech libretto by the composer, based on the play Její pastorkyňa by Gabriela Preissová. It was first performed at the National Theatre, Brno on 21 January 1904. Composed between 1896 and 1902, it is among the first operas written in prose.

The first of Janáček's operas in which his distinctive voice can clearly be heard, it is a grim story of infanticide and redemption. Like the playwright's original work, it is known for its unsentimental realism. While today it is heard in the composer's original version, Jenůfa's early popularity was due to a revised version by Karel Kovařovic, altering what was considered its eccentric style and orchestration. Thus altered, it was well-received, first in Prague, and particularly after its Vienna première also worldwide. More than 70 years passed before audiences again heard it in Janáček's original version.

Janáček wrote an overture to the opera, but decided not to use it. It was partly based on a song called Žárlivec (The jealous man). It is now performed as a concert piece under the title Žárlivost (Jealousy), JW 6/10.

The composer dedicated the work to the memory of his daughter Olga (d. 1903), as he did his choral composition the Elegy on the Death of Daughter Olga.

== Roles ==
| Role | Voice type | Premiere Cast, 21 January 1904 (Conductor: Cyril Metoděj Hrazdira) |
|---|---|---|
| Jenůfa | Soprano | Marie Kabeláčová |
| Laca Klemeň | Tenor | Alois Staněk-Doubravský |
| Števa Buryja | Tenor | Bohdan Procházka |
| Kostelnička Buryjovka | Soprano | Leopoldina Hanusová-Svobodová |
| Grandmother Buryjovka | Contralto | Věra Pivoňková |
| Stárek, the Mill foreman | Baritone | Karel Benýško |
| Mayor | bass | Alois Pivoňka |
| Mayor's wife | Mezzo-soprano | Ema Kučerová |
| Karolka | Mezzo-soprano | Růžena Kasperová |
Chorus:Recruits, servants, girls, villagers, musicians

== Synopsis ==
Place: A Moravian village
Time: the nineteenth century

The plot depends on a tangled set of village relationships. Before the opera begins, the mill-owner Grandmother Buryja had two sons. The elder married the widow of a man named Klemeň, became stepfather to her son Laca, and had a son of his own with her, Števa. The younger married twice, and had a daughter, Jenůfa, with his first wife. When the opera opens, Grandmother Buryja's sons and their wives have died, except for the Kostelnička (the sacristan or sextoness of the village church), the younger son's second wife and Jenůfa's stepmother. Custom dictates that Števa alone, as the elder son's only child, will inherit the mill, leaving his half-brother Laca and cousin Jenůfa to earn their livings.

=== Act 1 ===
Jenůfa, Laca, and Grandmother Buryja wait for Števa to return home. Jenůfa, in love with Števa and secretly pregnant with his child, worries that he may have been drafted into the army. Laca, in love with Jenůfa, expresses bitterness against his half-brother's favored position at home. As he complains he plays with a knife and, finding it blunt, gives it to the mill foreman to be sharpened.

The foreman informs the family that Števa has not been drafted, to Jenůfa's relief and Laca's increased frustration. The others leave, and Jenůfa waits to greet Števa. He appears with a group of soldiers, drunk and boasting of his prowess with the girls. He calls for music and drags the miserable Jenůfa into dancing with him.

The Kostelnička steps into this rowdy scene, silences the musicians and, shocked by Števa's behavior, forbids him to marry Jenůfa until he can stay sober for one full year. The soldiers and the family leave Števa and Jenůfa alone, and she begs him to love her, but he, unaware of her pregnancy, gives her casual answers and leaves.

Laca returns, as bitter as ever. He attempts to goad Jenůfa into criticizing Števa, but she takes her lover's side despite everything. Laca rages that Števa would never even look at her if it weren't for her rosy cheeks, then slashes her across the cheek with his knife.

=== Act 2 ===
Months later, it is winter. The baby has been born, but Števa has not yet come to visit his child. Jenůfa's face is still disfigured, but she is happy in her love for the baby. While Jenůfa sleeps, the Kostelnička summons Števa and demands that he take responsibility. He answers that while he will provide money in secret, no one must know the baby is his. His love for Jenůfa died when Laca spoiled her beauty, and he is now engaged to marry Karolka, the mayor's pretty daughter.

Števa leaves, and Laca enters. He still doesn't know the truth about the baby, and when the Kostelnička tells him, his first reaction is disgust at the thought of taking Števa's child under his wing. Fearful that Jenůfa will be left with no one to marry, Kostelnička hastily lies that the baby is dead. Laca leaves, and the Kostelnička is faced with the necessity of making the lie true. She wraps the baby in a shawl and leaves the house.

Jenůfa wakes up and says a prayer for her child's future, but the Kostelnička, returning, tells her that the baby died while she slept. Laca appears and comforts Jenůfa gently, asking that they spend the rest of their lives together. Seeing the tenderness of the couple, the Kostelnička tries to convince herself that she has acted for the best.

=== Act 3 ===
It is now spring, and Laca and Jenůfa's wedding day. All seems right again, except that the Kostelnička is a nervous wreck. Števa and Karolka visit, and a chorus of village girls sings a wedding song. Just then, screams are heard. The body of the baby has been discovered in the mill-stream under the melting ice. Jenůfa immediately says that the baby is hers, and in her grief appears guilty of the murder. The village is ready to exact immediate justice against Jenůfa, but the Kostelnička calms them and says that the crime is hers. Hearing the whole story, Jenůfa forgives her stepmother. The crowd takes the Kostelnička off to jail. Jenůfa and Laca are left alone. Jenůfa asks Laca to leave her, as she cannot expect him to marry her now. He replies that he will not leave her, and that he wishes to spend the rest of his life with her.

== Noted arias ==
- "In a moment" [Co chvíla] (Kostelnička)
- Jenůfa's prayer (Jenůfa)
- Finale [Odesli] (Jenůfa, Laca)

== Recordings ==
- 1951: Stepanka Jelinkova, Marta Krásová, Beno Blachut, Ivo Žídek, Miloslava Fidlerova, Milada Čadikovičová, Karel Kalaš, Marie Musilova, Vladimir Jedenactik, Milada Šubrtová, Prague National Theatre Chorus, Prague National Theatre Orchestra, conducted by Jaroslav Vogel. Label: Supraphon, recorded at the Dvořák Hall of the Rudolfinum, Prague 2 CDs
- 1969: Libuše Domaninskayá, Naděžda Kniplová, Vilém Přibyl, Ivo Žídek, Marie Mrázová, Jindřich Jindrák, Marta Bohácová, Prague National Theatre Chorus, Prague National Theatre Orchestra, conducted by Bohumil Gregor, Supraphon, recorded Zofin Hall, Prague, June 1969. Label: HMV; EMI CD reissue 2011
- 1974: Grace Bumbry, Magda Olivero, Renato Cioni, Jeda Valtriani, Nicola Zaccaria, Margherita Benetti, Giuseppe Morresi, Maria Grazia Allegri, Nella Verri, Silvana Zanolli, Jerzy Semkow (Conductor); La Scala Orchestra and Chorus. Recorded at the Teatro alla Scala, Milano, 1974 (sung in Italian). Label: Myto
- 1977: Gabriela Beňačková, Nadĕžda Kniplová, Vilém Přibyl, Vladimír Krejčík, Anna Barová, Karel Berman and others; Brno Janáček Opera Chorus, Brno Janáček Opera Orchestra, conducted by František Jílek. Recorded at the Janáček Opera House, Brno, 1977/78. Label: Supraphon 10 2751-2 612, 2CDs
- 1980: Elisabeth Söderström, Sena Jurinac, Allen Cathcart, William Lewis, Soňa Červená, Willard White, John del Carlo, Gwendolyn Jones, Sara Ganz, Susan Quittmeyer, Pamela South; San Francisco Opera Orchestra and Chorus, conducted by Albert Rosen. Recorded at the War Memorial Opera House, San Francisco, October 1, 1980 (as on the accompanying material, but possibly the performance of October 10, which was broadcast). Label: Gala
- 1983: Elisabeth Söderström, Eva Randová, Wieslaw Ochman, Peter Dvorský, Václav Zítek, Dalibor Jedlička, Ivana Mixová, Lucia Popp, Marie Mrazová; Vienna Philharmonic Orchestra, Vienna State Opera Chorus, conducted by Charles Mackerras, recorded Sofiensaal, Vienna, April 1982. Label: Decca
- 1988: Gabriela Benackova, Leonie Rysanek, Wieslaw Ochman, Peter Kazaras; Opera Orchestra of New York, conducted by Eve Queler. Recorded at Carnegie Hall, March 30, 1988. Label: BIS.
- 2002: Karita Mattila, Anja Silja, Jorma Silvasti, Jerry Hadley, Eva Randová; Orchestra of the Royal Opera House, Covent Garden, conducted by Bernard Haitink, recorded at the Royal Opera House, London, 10–18 October 2001. Label: Erato Records
- 2003: Janice Watson, Dame Josephine Barstow, Nigel Robson, Peter Wedd, Elizabeth Vaughan; Chorus and Orchestra of Welsh National Opera, conducted by Sir Charles Mackerras. Recorded at Brangwyn Hall, Swansea, United Kingdom, July 2003 (sung in English). Label: Chandos
- 2009: Amanda Roocroft, Deborah Polaski, Miroslav Dvorský, Nikolai Schukoff, Mette Ejsing, Károly Szemerédy, Miguel Sola, Marta Mathéu, Marta Ubieta, Elena Poesina; Teatro Real Orchestra and Chorus, conducted by Ivor Bolton; Stage Director: Stéphane Braunschweig. Recorded at the Teatro Real, Madrid, 2009. Label: Opus Arte (DVD)
- 2014: Gal James, Iris Vermillion, Aleš Briscein, Taylan Reinhard, Dunja Vejzović; Choir and Singschul' of the Graz Opera, Graz Philharmonic Orchestra, Dirk Kaftan, conductor, recorded live during staged performances at Graz Opera, Austria, 7, 17, 21 – 22 May 2014; Oehms Classics OC 962; 2 CDs
- 2024: Agneta Eichenholz, Katarina Karnéus, Aleš Briscein, Nicky Spence, Jan Martiník, Carole Wilson; London Symphony Orchestra & Chorus, Simon Rattle, recorded live at the Barbican in January 2024; Label: LSO Live; 2 SACDs
