= Jaroslav Vogel =

Czech musician (1894–1970)

Jaroslav Vogel (11 January 1894 – 2 February 1970) was a Czech conductor, composer and writer. He was principal conductor of the Brno Philharmonic Orchestra from 1959 to 1962.

He was a conductor in his native Plzeň from 1914 to 1915 and in Ostrava 1919 to 1923, returning as chief conductor from 1927 to 1943. He conducted in Prague from 1923 to 1927. He was renowned for conducted operas by Janáček, Smetana, and Novák. He was the author of 4 operas.

Vogel knew Janáček in his later years, and produced what was for many years the standard biography of Janáček in 1958. It first appeared in German translation, and in the Czech original in 1963. The first English translation came out in 1962, it was then re-issued in a version revised by Karel Janovický in 1981. Charles Mackerras regarded it as his "Janáček bible".

Vogel died in Prague in 1970.
