= Brno Philharmonic =

Czech symphonic orchestra

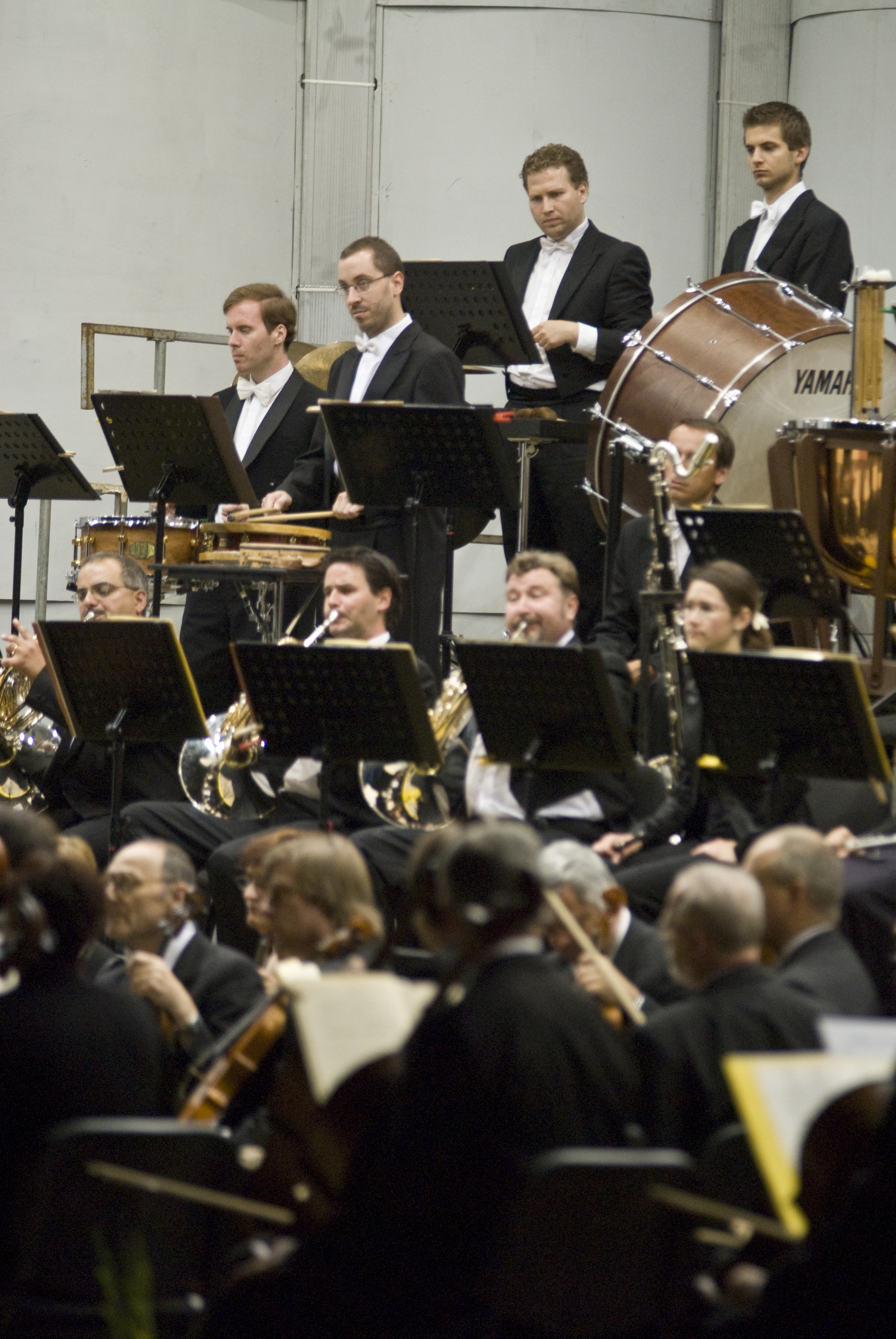
Brno Philharmonic during the 2010 Špilberk festival.

The Brno Philharmonic (Czech: Filharmonie Brno) is a symphonic orchestra based in Brno, the Czech Republic. Its principal concert venue in Brno is the Besední dům. The orchestra also performs regularly in the Janáček Theatre in Brno. The orchestra receives public support from the City of Brno, the Ministry of Culture of the Czech Republic and the South Moravian Region (Jihomoravský kraj). The orchestra's current managing director is Marie Kučerová.

The orchestra was founded in 1956 through the merger of the Brno Radio and Regional orchestras, and since then it has ranked among the top Czech orchestras in both size and significance. Břetislav Bakala, a pupil of Leoš Janáček, was its first chief conductor. The orchestra is based in and performs at the neo-Renaissance Besední dům designed by the Viennese architect Theophil von Hansen. Until the construction of the Janáčkovo kulturní centrum ('Janáček Cultural Center') with an up-to-date concert hall is completed, the orchestra regularly performs in full ensemble at the Janáček Theatre. On its tours, the Brno Philharmonic has given countless concerts in Europe, the United States, Latin America, and the Far and Near East. It is a regular guest at both international and Czech festivals, often collaborating artistically with the Czech Philharmonic Choir Brno.

The current chief is American conductor Dennis Russel Davies (since 2018).

== Principal conductors ==
- Břetislav Bakala (1956–1958)
- Jaroslav Vogel (1959–1962)
- Jiří Waldhans (1962–1978)
- František Jílek (1978–1983)
- Petr Vronský (1983–1991)
- Leoš Svárovský (1991–1995)
- Otakar Trhlík (1995–1997)
- Aldo Ceccato (1997–2000)
- Petr Altrichter (2002–2009)
- Aleksandar Marković (2009–2015)
- Dennis Russell Davies (2018–)

== Conductors laureate ==
- Caspar Richter (2002–2023)
- Sir Charles Mackerras (2007–2010)

== Venues ==
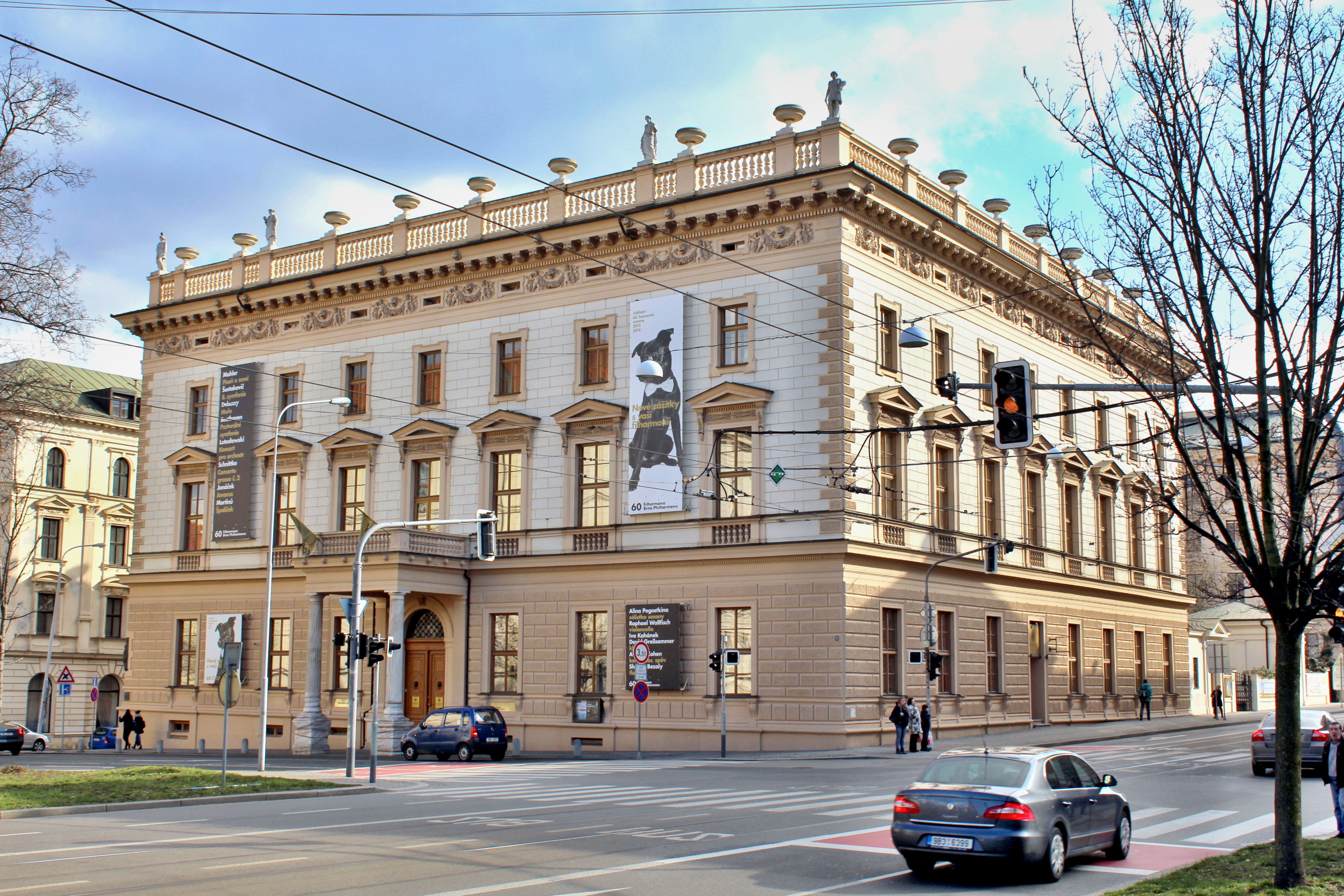
Besední dům

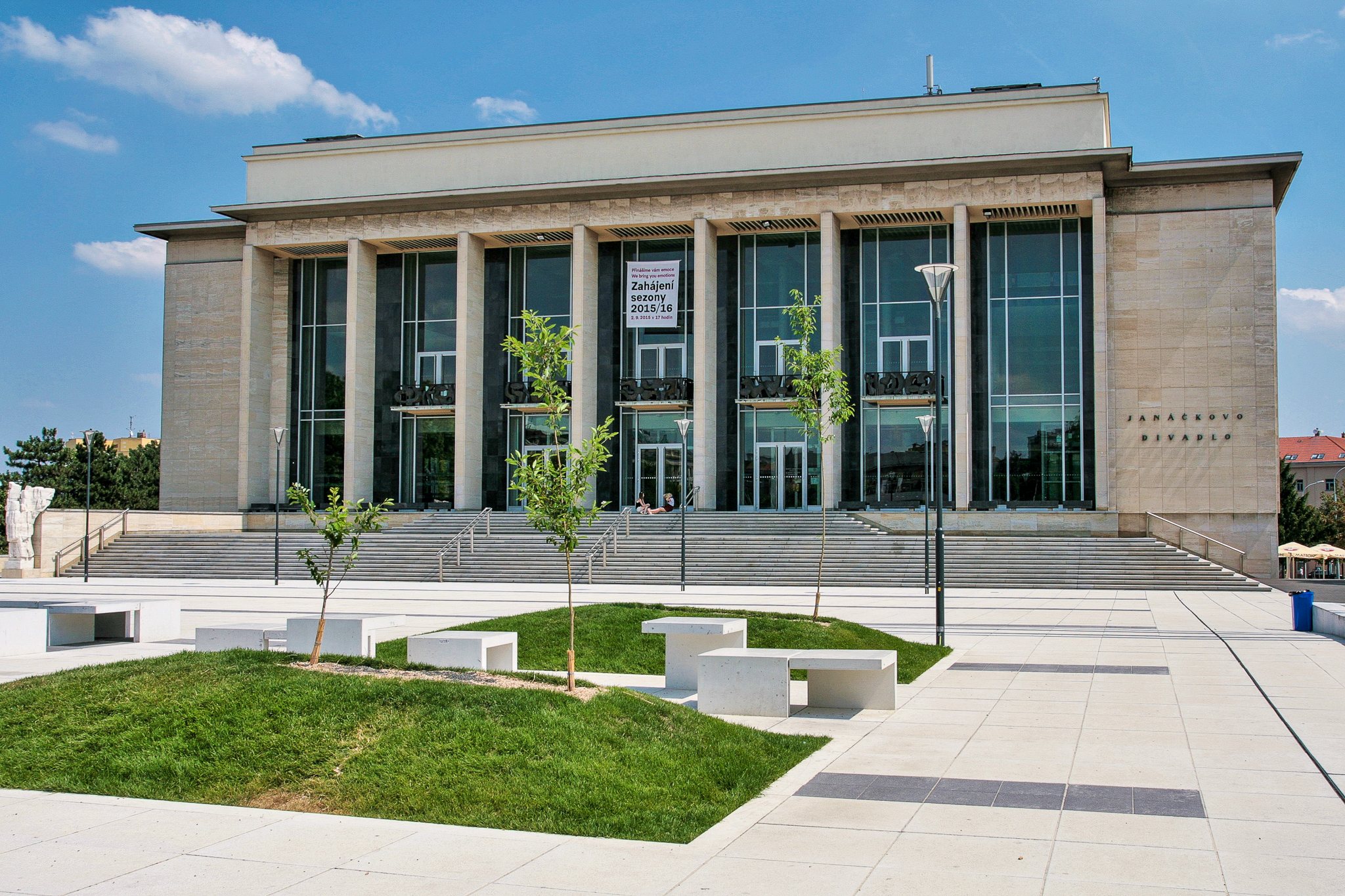
Janáček Theatre
