= Káťa Kabanová =

Opera by Leoš Janáček

- Opera by Leoš Janáček
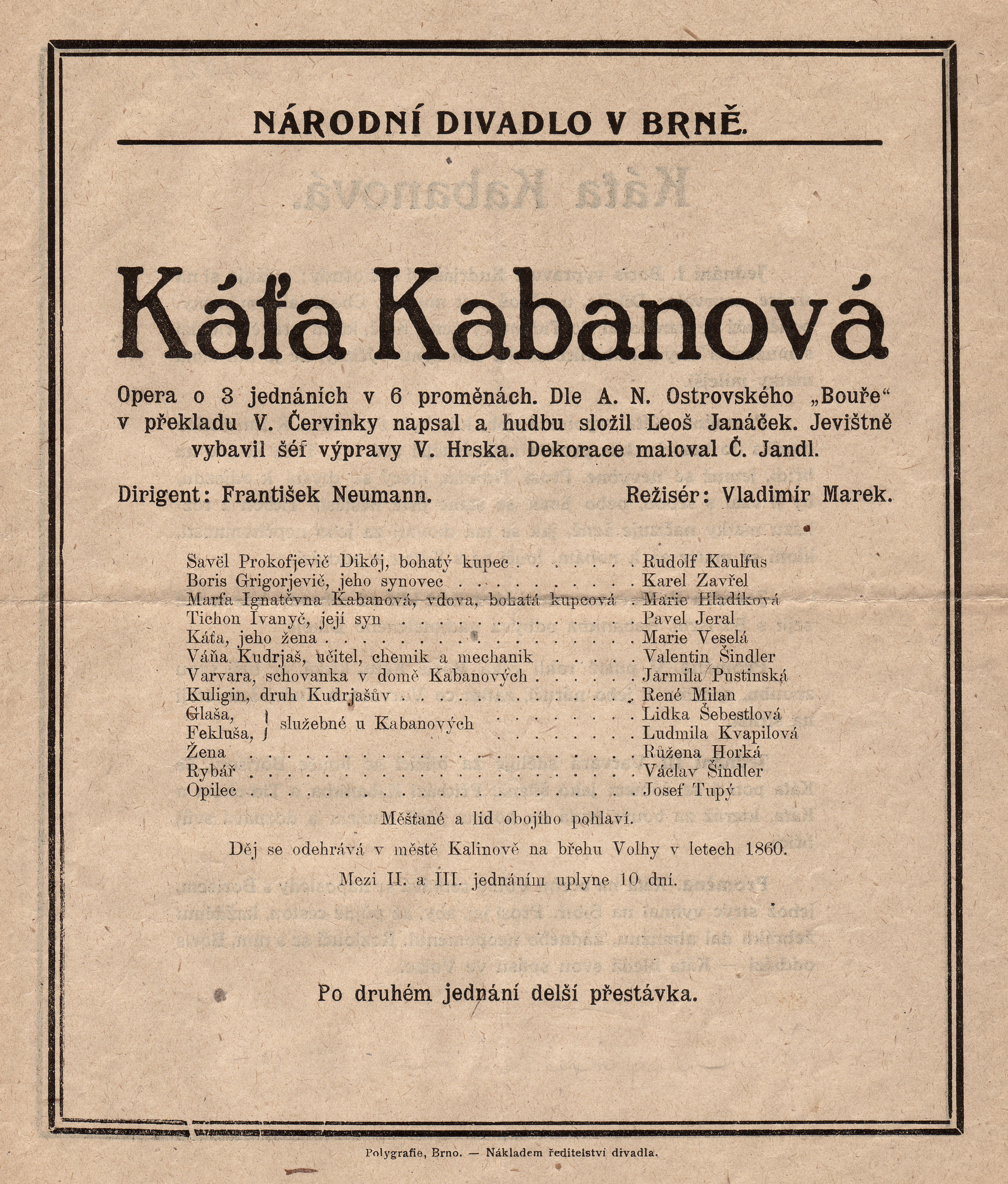
- Poster for the premiere
- Librettist: Vincenc Červinka
- Language: Czech
- Based on: The Storm by Alexander Ostrovsky
- Premiere: 23 November 1921; National Theatre Brno

Káťa Kabanová (also known in various spellings including Katia, Katja, Katya, and Kabanowa) is an opera in three acts, with music by Leoš Janáček to a libretto by the composer based on The Storm, a play by Alexander Ostrovsky, translated by Vincenc Červinka. The opera was also largely inspired by Janáček's love for Kamila Stösslová. Although he was 67 when it was premiered, Káťa Kabanová is a clear response to Janáček's feelings for Kamila, and the work is dedicated to her. The first performance was at the National Theatre Brno on 23 November 1921.

The opera has had a complex publication history. František Neumann, the conductor of the opera's first performance, made changes that were incorporated into the first publication of the score in 1922 by Universal Edition. Conductor Václav Talich later produced a "re-orchestrated" version of the score. In 1992, Sir Charles Mackerras published a critical edition of the opera.

== Roles ==
Note: The name of the opera and the main character is usually transliterated in English as Káta, Kata or Katya because of the Czech diacritics.

Roles, voice types, premiere cast
Role	Voice type	Premiere cast, 23 November 1921 Conductor: František Neumann
Savël Prokofjevic Dikój, a merchant	bass	Rudolf Kaulfus
Boris Grigorjevič, Dikój's nephew	tenor	Karel Zavřel
Marfa Ignatěvna Kabanová (Kabanicha), widow of a rich merchant	contralto	Marie Hladíková
Tichon Ivanyč Kabanov, her son	tenor	Pavel Jeral
Káťa (Katerina), Tichon's wife	soprano	Marie Veselá
Váňa Kudrjaš, a schoolteacher	tenor	Valentin Šindler
Varvara, a foundling	mezzo-soprano	Jarmila Pustinská
Kuligin, friend of Vána Kudrjaš	baritone	René Milan
Glaša, a servant	mezzo-soprano	Lidka Šebestlová
Fekluša, a servant	mezzo-soprano	Ludmila Kvapilová(-Kudláčková)
Žena (Woman)		Ružena Horká
Rybář (Fisherman)		Václav Šindler
Opilec (Drunkard)		Josef Tupý
Male and female citizens

== Synopsis ==
Place: The Russian town of Kalinov on the shores of the Volga River
Time: The 1860s

=== Act 1 ===
Váňa Kudrjáš admires the view of the Volga River, which amuses the more literal-minded housekeeper of the adjoining Kabanov estate. Two men approach, Dikoj and his nephew, Boris Grigorjevič, where Dikoj is berating Boris. Dikoj learns that Kabanicha, the Kabanov family matriarch, is not at home. Dikoj leaves, and Boris explains to Váňa Kudrjáš why he tolerates the abuse: his parents are dead, and to be able to collect his inheritance, he must respect his uncle no matter what his uncle says to him. Boris also tells Váňa Kudrjáš that he is secretly in love with Káťa, the young wife of Tichon. Káťa appears and Kabanicha reproaches her son Tichon – Kaťa's husband – for his inattentiveness. Tichon and Káťa try to calm her down, but Kabanicha will have none of it, telling Tichon that he spoils Káťa. Tichon complains to Varvara, the family's foster daughter, who rebukes him for retreating into drinking more than defending Káťa.

In the house, Káťa tells Varvara of her happy childhood, and dreams of having a man who truly loves her. Tichon enters to say good-bye, as he is journeying to Kazan on business, for Kabanicha. Káťa asks to accompany him or for him not to go, but he insists. Káťa then asks him to make her swear an oath to speak to no strangers during his absence, which puzzles Tichon. Kabanicha announces that Tichon must go, but not before instructing Káťa how to behave in his absence. Tichon dutifully says that Káťa must treat Kabanicha like her own mother and always act properly. He bows to Kabanicha and kisses her and Kát'a before he departs.

=== Act 2 ===
The women are working on embroidery. Kabanicha criticizes Káťa for not appearing more sorrowful at Tichon's absence. After Kabanicha leaves, Varvara shows Káťa the key to the far part of the garden. Varvara intends to meet Váňa, her lover, there. She hints at the same suggestion for Káťa, and puts the key in her hand. Káťa is hesitant, but then surrenders to fate and will meet Boris. She steps outside as evening comes on. Kabanicha reappears with Dikoj, who is drunk and complaining that people take advantage of his softhearted nature. However, Kabanicha chastises him.

Váňa Kudrjás is waiting for Varvara in the garden. Boris then unexpectedly appears, after receiving a message to go there. Varvara arrives, and she and Váňa go for a walk by the river. Káťa then appears, and Boris declares his love for her. She is at first worried about social ruin, but finally she reciprocates, confessing her secret feelings for him. They embrace and they too leave for a walk. Váňa and Varvara return, as she explains her precautions should Kabanicha suddenly appear. Káťa and Boris are heard in wordless, ecstatic duet as Váňa and Varvara say that it is time to return home.

=== Act 3 ===
Ten days later

Váňa Kudrjáš and Kuligin are strolling near the river when an approaching storm causes them to take shelter in a ruined building. Other people join them, including Dikoj. Váňa tries to calm Dikoj with scientific explanations about a new invention, the lightning rod. However, this only angers Dikoj, who insists that lightning is not caused by electricity but is the punishment from God. The rain dies down, and people start to leave the shelter. Váňa meets Boris and Varvara. Varvara says that Tichon has returned, and Káťa is very agitated. Kabanicha arrives with Tichon and Káťa. The storm returns, and people assume initially that this is what upsets Káťa. However, she confesses to Tichon in front of everyone her assignation with Boris during her husband's absence. Then she runs out into the storm.

Evening approaches after the storm has ended. Tichon and a search party are looking for Káťa. At first among the party, Varvara and Váňa then decide to leave the village for Moscow and start a new life. They leave, and as the searchers continue, Káťa appears. She knows that her confession has dishonoured her and humiliated Boris. She feels tormented and wants to meet Boris one more time. Boris appears and sees her, and the two embrace. Boris says that his uncle is sending him away to another town, but asks her what will become of her. As her sanity deteriorates, she first begs him to be allowed to accompany him, then insists that she could not and bids him farewell; he leaves in sorrow. After thinking of how nature will continue to flourish over her grave, Káťa throws herself into the river. Kuligin sees this from the far bank and calls for help. Tichon appears, followed by Kabanicha. Tichon tries to help Káťa but is restrained by Kabanicha; he blames her for Káťa's suicide. Dikoj appears with Káťa's body and lays her on the ground. Tichon cries over the body as, without any emotion, Kabanicha thanks the bystanders—or, as often done, the audience—for their help.

== Recordings ==
=== Audio ===
- 1979/2006: Decca Classics 475 7518 (2006 CD reissue of the 1979 recording, also available as download); Elisabeth Söderström, Petr Dvorský, Dalibor Jedlička, Naděžda Kniplová; Vladimír Krejčík, Zdenĕk Švehla, Libuše Márová, Jaroslav Souček, Jitka Pavlová, Gertrude Jahn, Adolf Tomaschek, Hedwig Drechsler; Vienna Philharmonic; Chorus of the Vienna State Opera; Sir Charles Mackerras, conductor
- 1994: Supraphon 10 8016-2 612: Drahomíra Tikalová, Ludmila Komancová, Beno Blachut, Viktor Kočí, Zdeněk Kroupa; Prague National Theatre Orchestra and Chorus; Jaroslav Krombholc, conductor
- 1997: Supraphon SU 3291-2 632: Gabriela Beňačková, Dagmar Pecková, Erika Bauerová, Dana Burešová, Eva Randová, Miroslav Kopp, Jozef Kundlák, Peter Straka, Zdeněk Harvánek; Czech Philharmonic; Prague National Theatre Chorus; Sir Charles Mackerras, conductor
- 2007: Chandos B00119PUQS: Cheryl Barker, Jane Henschel, Robert Brubaker; Chorus and Orchestra Welsh National Opera; Carlo Rizzi, conductor
- 2024: LSO Live LSO0889: Amanda Majeski (Katya), Simon O'Neill (Boris), Katarina Dalayman (Kabanicha), Andrew Staples (Tichon), Ladislav Elgr (Kudrjash), Magdalena Kožená (Varvara), Pavlo Hunka (Dikoy), Claire Barnett-Jones (Glasha & Feklusha), Lukáš Zeman (Kuligin), Chorus and Orchestra London Symphony Orchestra; Simon Rattle (conductor).

=== Video ===
- 1998 Salzburg Festival, Czech Philharmonic Orchestra, conducted by Sylvain Cambreling, staged by Christoph Marthaler, with Angela Denoke (Káta Kabanová, Soprano), David Kuebler (Boris), Jane Henschel (Kabanicha), DVD, EuroArts, Kultur, TDK, released 2002.
- 2008 Coro Y Orquesta Titular Del Teatro Real, conducted by Jiří Bělohlávek, staged by Robert Carsen, with Karita Mattila (Káta Kabanová), Miroslav Dvorský (Boris), Dalia Schaechter (Kabanicha), Blu-ray and DVD, FRA Musica, released 2010.
- 2022: Salzburg Festival. Vienna Philharmonic conducted by Jakub Hrůša, with Jens Larsen (Dikoj), David Butt Philip (Boris), Evelyn Herlitzius (Kabanicha), Jaroslav Březina (Tichon), Corinne Winters (Katya), Benjamin Hulett (Kudrjáš), Jarmila Balážová (Varvara), Michael Mofidian (Kuligin), Nicole Chirka (Glaša), Ann-Kathrin Niemczyk (Fekluša). Stage director: Barrie Kosky; video director: Felix Breisach. Recorded live at the Großes Festspielhaus, August 2022. Blu-ray and DVD: Unitel Edition.
