= Osvald Chlubna =

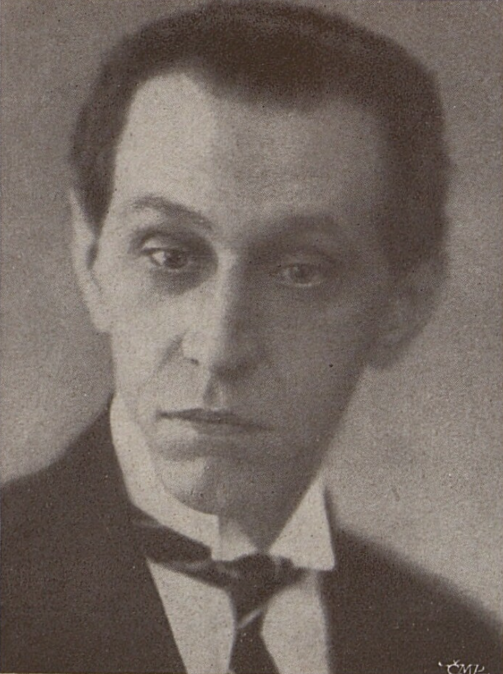
Chlubna in 1927

Osvald Chlubna (22 July 1893 – 30 October 1971) was a Czech composer.

== Life and career ==
Chlubna was born on 22 July 1893 in Brno. Intending originally to study engineering, Chlubna switched his major and from 1914 to 1924, he studied composition with Leoš Janáček. Until 1953, he worked as a clerk. Later, he taught at the Organ School in Brno for many years. He worked in many art organisations in Brno. Chlubna's works can be defined by three distinct periods: Romanticism, Impressionism, all the way to the Modern Constructivism. He delved into Symbolism as well. He used the texts of symbolic Czech poets, such as Otakar Březina, Jaroslav Vrchlický, Jaroslav Durych and others. He wrote several cycles of compositions for piano and organ, as well as instrumental concerts, symphonies, ouvertures and cantatas. He wrote many operas, often using his own librettos, such as The Revenge of Catullus based on the work of Vrchlický (1917), Alladina and Palomid (based on the work of Maeterlinck, 1925), Ňura (1932), How the Death came in the World (1936), Jiří from Kunštát and Poděbrady (based on the work of Alois Jirásek, 1941), Cradle (composed on the work of Jirásek, 1951), Eupyros (1960). He also wrote texts and articles primarily about Janáček.

Chlubna died on 30 October 1971 in Brno, at the age of 78.

== Selected works ==
Opera

- Pomsta Catullova (The Revenge of Catullus), 1 Act (1917); libretto by the composer based on the work of Jaroslav Vrchlický
- Alladina a Palomid (Alladina and Palomid), 3 Acts (1922); libretto by the composer based on the work of Maurice Maeterlinck
- Ňura, 2 Acts (1930); libretto by O. Dymov
- Jak smrt přišla do světa (How Death Came into the World) (1936); libretto by the composer
- Freje pána z Heslova (The Friar of Heslov), 4 Acts (1939–1940); libretto by F. L. Stroupežnichký
- Jiří z Kunštátu a Poděbrad (Jiří from Kunštát and Poděbrady), 3 Acts (1941–1942); libretto by the composer based on the work of Alois Jirásek
- Kolébka (The Cradle), 3 Acts (1951–1952); libretto by the composer based on the work of Alois Jirásek
- Eupyros, 3 Acts (1960–1962); libretto by the composer

Ballet

- Hrátky na drátkách (1955); libretto by the composer

Orchestra

- Karneval podzimu (Winter Carneval), Op.82
- Portály a fresky brněnské
- Symphony No.3 "Osudová" (1960)
- To je má zem (This is My Country), Cycle of Symphonic Poems for Orchestra

Brněnské kašny a fontány, Op.86 (1963)
Propast Macocha, Op.87
Hrad Pernštejn, Op.88
Ej chlapci, hore!, Op.90

- Veseloherní předehra (Comedy Overture)

Band

- Pochod sportovců

Concertante

- Andante for Violin and Small Orchestra
- Fantasie in C Minor for Viola and Orchestra, Op.44 (1936)
- Concerto for Violin and Orchestra, Op.75

Chamber

- Elegie ztracených lidí (Elegy of Lost Peoples) for Cello and Piano (1924)
- Fantasie for violin and viola, Op.71 (1949)
- Invence (Invention) for Viola Solo (1962)
- Sonata for Violin and Cello, Op.22 (1925)
- Sonata for Violin and Piano, Op.66 (1948)
- Sonatina for Viola and Piano, Op.119
- String Quartet in C Major, Op.26
- String Quartet No.3 in E♭, Op.35 (1933)
- String Quartet No.5, Op.114
- Suita instruktivní for Violin and Piano

Piano

- Nokturna (Nocturnes), Cycle of Moods, Op.36 (1933)
- Preludium, toccata a fuga, Op.37
- Sonáta-fantazie, Op.93

Organ

- Allegro feroce
- Passacaglia, Op.41

Choral

- Já, potulný šumař, Cantata
- Je krásná země má, Lyric Cantata for Chorus and Orchestra; text by F. Halas, A. Sova
- Ve jménu života, Cantata for Chorus and Orchestra, Op.94

Vocal

- Melancholické serenády o lásce (Melancholic Serenades of Love) for Voice and Piano, Op.62
