= František Jílek =

Czech conductor (1913–1993)

- Czech conductor František Jílek
- Born: 22 May 1913; Židenice, Moravia, Austria-Hungary
- Died: 16 September 1993 (aged 80)
- Education: Brno Conservatory, Prague Conservatory
- Occupation: conductor
- Known for: interpretation of Leoš Janáček's works
- Notable work: principal conductor of the Janáček Opera in Brno

František Jílek (22 May 1913 – 16 September 1993) was a Czech conductor, known especially for his interpretation of Leoš Janáček's works.

== Life ==
Jílek was born in Židenice, Moravia, Austria-Hungary (today part of Brno, Czech Republic). He began studying piano and composition as a pupil of Jaroslav Kvapil, and later studied conducting under Antonín Balatka and Zdeněk Chalabala at the Brno Conservatory. In 1937, Jílek completed his education at the Prague Conservatory, in the master class of Vítězslav Novák. From 1938 to 1949 he conducted the opera in Ostrava. In 1952, he became the principal conductor of the Janáček Opera in Brno, a position he held for 25 years. During his career Jílek frequently conducted the orchestra of the National Theatre in Prague, the Czech Philharmonic, as well as orchestras abroad. In 1978, he became the conductor of the Brno Philharmonic Orchestra.

== Work ==
He conducted the complete operas of Bedřich Smetana and Leoš Janáček, and also focused on Russian and Italian operatic repertoire. The recordings of his interpretations of Janáček's, Novák's and Martinů's work are available on the Czech label Supraphon. He was awarded the Orphée d'Or de l'Academie National du Disque Lyrique (Prix Arturo Toscanini-Paul Vergnes) for the recording of Janáček's opera Jenůfa in 1980.

== Selected recordings ==
- Fibich: The Bride of Messina CD. 11 1492-2 612 (Supraphon)
- Janáček: The Excursions of Mr. Brouček CD. 11 2153-20612 (Supraphon)
- Janáček: Destiny CD. SU 0045-2 611 (Supraphon)
- Janáček: Jenůfa CD. SU 3869-2 612 (Supraphon)
- Janáček: Orchestral Works I.-III. CD. SU 3886-3888-2 031 (Supraphon)
