= National Theatre Brno =

Opera, ballet and drama company in the Czech Republic

Coordinates: 49°11′48″N 16°36′47″E

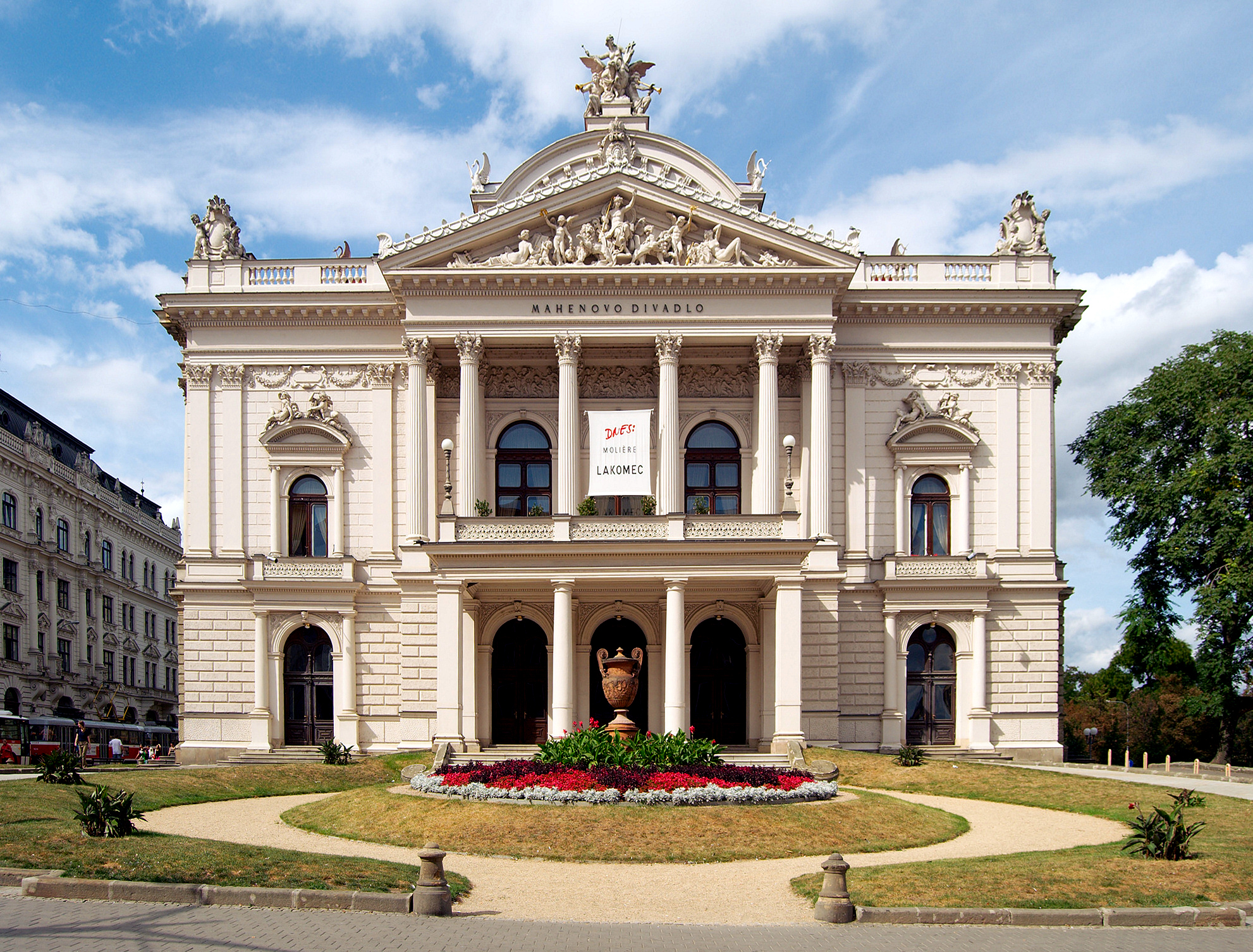
Mahen Theatre

The National Theatre Brno (Czech: Národní divadlo Brno) is an opera, ballet and drama company in Brno, Czech Republic, that nation's second busiest. It was established in 1884 on the model of the National Theatre company in Prague. Today it runs the biennial Janáček Festival, in November, and has three venues:

- Janáček Theatre, the largest, completed in 1965
- Mahen Theatre, originally the German-language Theatre on the Walls, with some 700 seats; finished in 1882; first theatre on the Continent with electric lighting (designed by Thomas Alva Edison himself); site of the premieres of most of Janáček's operas
- Reduta Theatre, the oldest theatre house in Central Europe, recently reconstructed; in December 1767 the twelve-year-old Wolfgang Amadeus Mozart gave a concert there

The opera company has made two visits to Hong Kong; the Arts Festival of 2017 where it gave the first performance in Asia of Janáček's Makropoulos Case, and 2026 where it presented Eugene Onegin.
