= Brno Central Cemetery =

Graveyard in Brno, Czech Republic

- Ústřední hřbitov
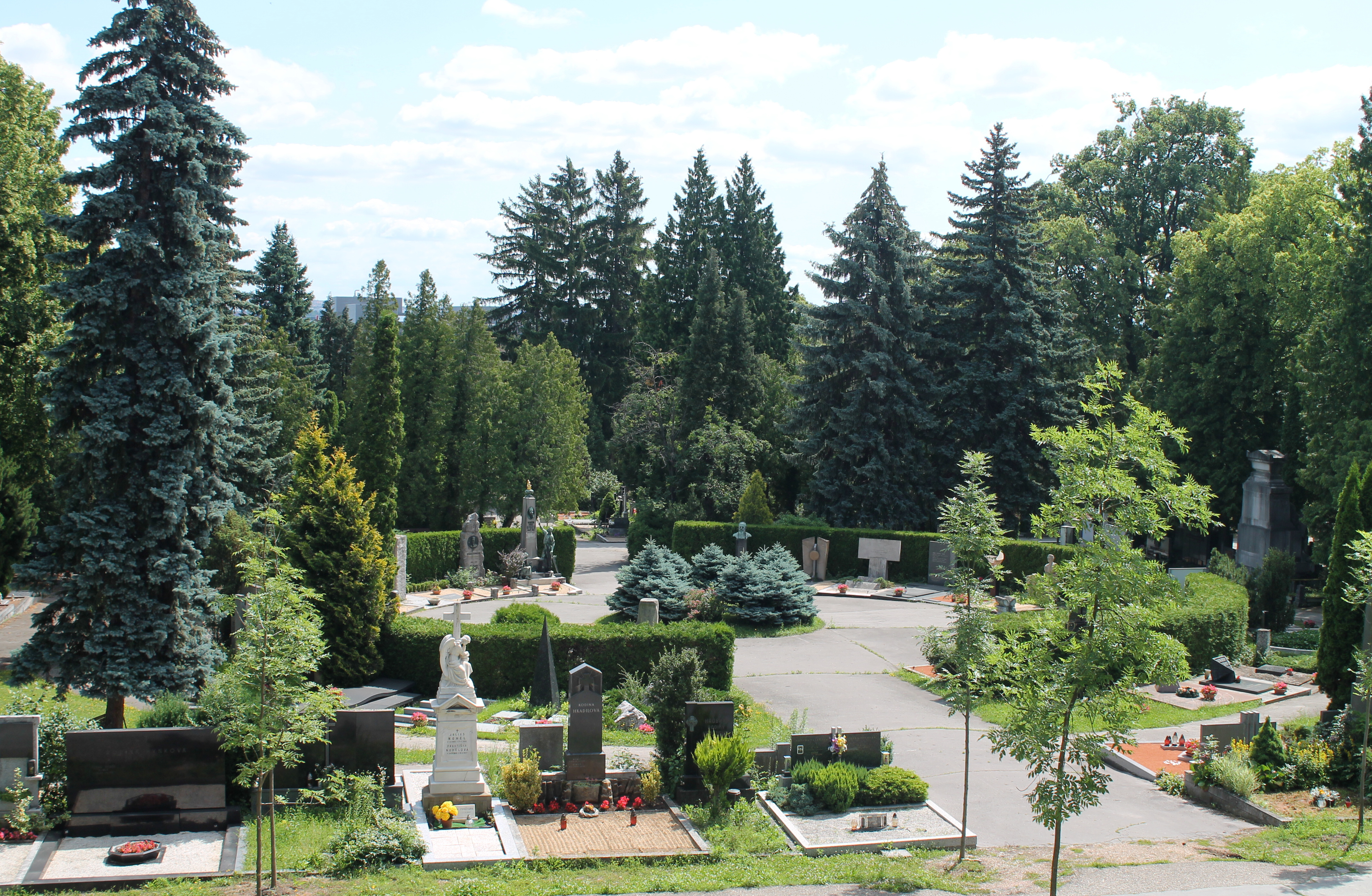
- Circle of Honour
- Interactive map of Brno Central Cemetery

Details
- Established: 1883
- Location: Brno
- Country: Czech Republic
- Coordinates: 49°10′8″N 16°35′40″E
- Type: Public
- Size: 43.34 hectares (107 acres)
- No. of graves: 80,000

Brno Central Cemetery (alternatively called Central Cemetery of Brno; Czech: Ústřední hřbitov (v Brně)) is a graveyard in Brno, Czech Republic. It is the second largest cemetery in the Czech Republic with an area of 43.3 ha (107 acres). It was opened in 1883.

== Location and organisation ==
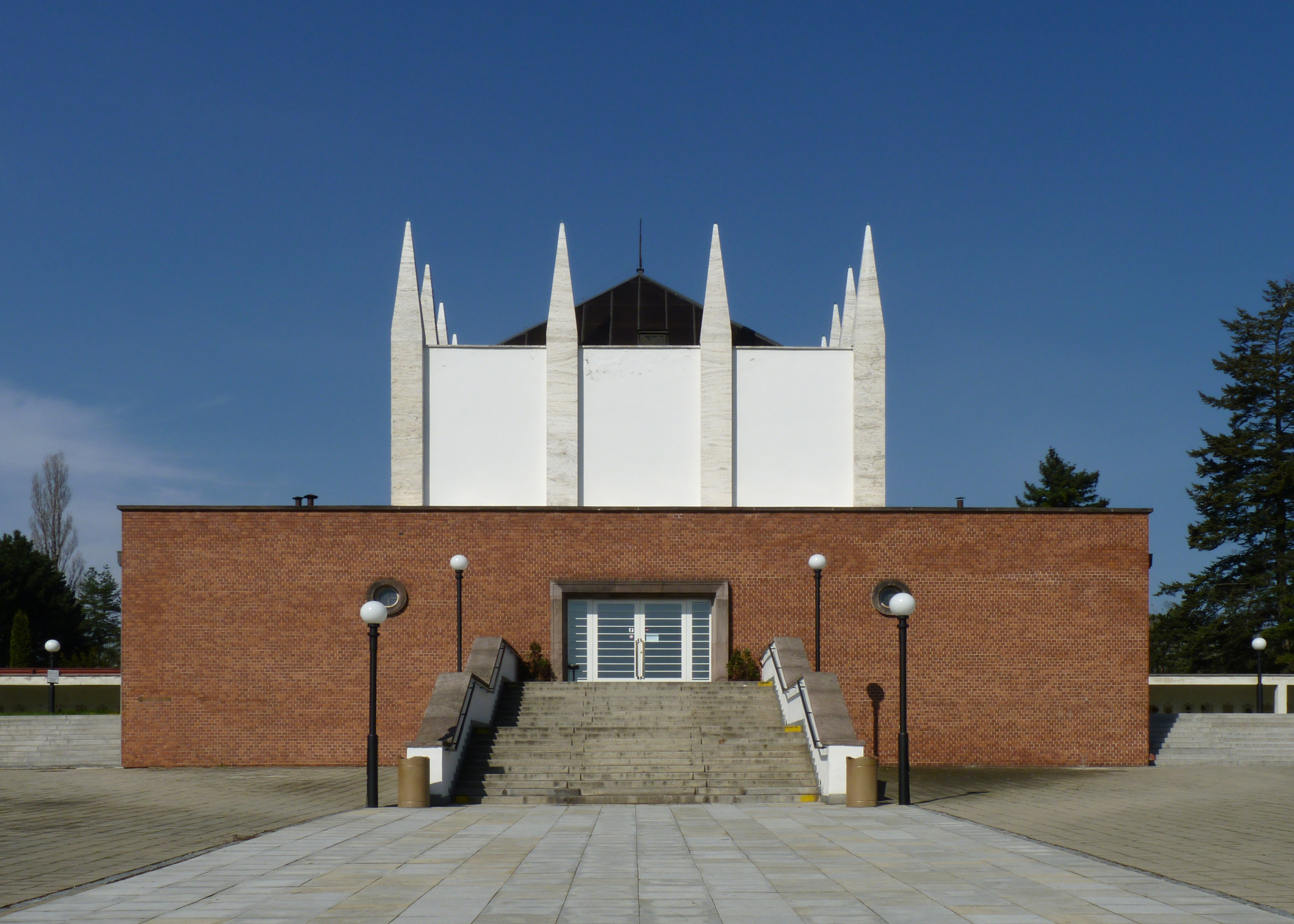
Crematorium

The Brno Central Cemetery has an area of 43.3 ha (107 acres), making it the second largest graveyard in the Czech Republic after Olšany Cemetery in Prague. It is located in the Štýřice district of Brno in the southern part of Brno. The cemetery is divided into 113 sections and also includes the Circle of Honour and the Alley of Honour for the funerals of important figures of the city of Brno, and a military cemetery.

The Brno Central Cemetery consists of about 70,000 grave sites, and about 400,000 deceased are buried there. There are also three scattering meadows.

== History ==
The Brno Central Cemetery was established in 1882–1883 according to the project of the architect Alois Prastorfer, originally on an area of 28 ha (69 acres). The Ceremonial Hall was built according to the design by Bohuslav Fuchs and Josef Polášek in 1926–1927.

Since 1958, the entire cemetery is protected as a cultural monument. Since 1989, the Honorary Burial Place of Allied Troops and Participants in the Domestic Resistance from World War II is protected as a national cultural monument. Since 2017, the crematorium, which was built by Ernst Wiesner in the Functionalist style in 1926–1929, is also protected as a national cultural monument.

== Notable interments ==
Notable people buried at Brno Central Cemetery include:

=== Politics and military ===
- Evžen Erban (1912–1994), politician
- Jan Helcelet (1812–1878), politician, naturalist and journalist
- Josef Hybeš (1850–1921), labour leader, politician and journalist
- Kurt Knispel (1921–1945), German tank commander
- Leopold Lojka (1886–1926), chauffeur and soldier
- Pavel Andreyevich Mironov (1919–1945), Russian soldier
- Carl Friedrich von Pückler-Burghauss (1886–1945), German military officer
- Tomáš Eduard Šilinger (1866–1913), politician and journalist
- Rudolf Singule (1883–1945), military leader
- Josef Urválek (1910–1979), judge and prosecutor
- Zdeňka Wiedermannová-Motyčková (1868–1915), women's rights activist
- František Zach (1807–1892), military leader and military theorist

=== Science and academia ===
- Karel Absolon (1877–1960), archaeologist, paleontologist and speleologist
- Inocenc Arnošt Bláha (1879–1960), sociologist and philosopher
- Otakar Borůvka (1899–1995), mathematician
- Josef Dobrovský (1753–1829), philologist and historian
- Leoš Firkušný (1905–1950), musicologist
- Antonín Fleischer (1850–1934), entomologist and physician
- Václav Holek (1886–1954), firearm engineer
- Albert Kutal (1904–1976), art historian
- Vladimír List (1877–1971), electrical engineer and scientist
- Leopold Melichar (1856–1924), entomologist
- Gregor Mendel (1822–1884), Austrian biologist, meteorologist and mathematician
- Cyril Napp (1792–1867), abbot and scholar
- Arne Novák (1880–1939), literary historian
- František Trávníček (1888–1961), Slavist and Bohemist
- Václav Vondrák (1859–1925), Slavist
- František Vymazal (1841–1917), polyglot and linguist
- Heinrich Wawra von Fernsee (1831–1887), botanist, physician and explorer
- Jan Zavřel (1879–1946), zoologist and entomologist

=== Arts ===
- Jiří Baborovský (1875–1946), physical chemist
- Břetislav Bakala (1897–1958), conductor, pianist and composer
- Josef Berg (1927–1971), composer and musicologist
- Ivan Blatný (1919–1990), poet
- Lev Blatný (1894–1930), poet and writer
- Helena Bochořáková-Dittrichová (1894–1980), illustrator and painter
- Gustav Brom (1921–1995), musician and composer
- Osvald Chlubna (1893–1971), composer
- Vlasta Fialová (1928–1998), actress
- Rudolf Firkušný (1912–1994), pianist
- Vladimír Fischer (1870–1947), architect
- Bohuslav Fuchs (1895–1972), architect
- Bedřich Golombek (1901–1961), journalist and writer
- Miloslav Ištvan (1928–1990), composer
- Leoš Janáček (1854–1928), composer and folklorist
- Hana Janků (1940–1995), opera singer
- František Jílek (1913–1993), conductor
- Václav Kaprál (1889–1947), composer and pianist
- Vítězslava Kaprálová (1915–1940), composer and conductor
- Václav Kosmák (1843–1898), writer, humorist and satirist
- Pavel Křížkovský (1820–1885), choral composer and conductor
- Jiří Kroha (1893–1974), architect, painter and designer
- Milan Kundera (1929–2023), writer and poet
- Jaroslav Kvapil (1892–1958), composer, conductor and pianist
- Jiří Mahen (1882–1939), writer and playwright
- Jan Novák (1921–1984), composer
- Vilém Petrželka (1889–1967), composer and conductor
- Antonín Přidal (1935–2017), translator, writer and journalist
- Antonín Procházka (1882–1945), painter and graphic artist
- Marie Rafajová (1896–1978), writer, journalist and translator
- Zdeněk Řihák (1924–2006), architect
- Zdeněk Rotrekl (1920–2013), poet, literary historian and writer
- Theodor Schaefer (1904–1969), composer and pedagogue
- Jan Skácel (1922–1989), poet
- Vladimír Šťastný (1841–1910), poet
- Františka Stránecká (1839–1888), writer and folklorist
- František Sušil (1804–1868), folk-song collector and translator
- Vilém Tauský (1910–2004), conductor and composer
- Rudolf Těsnohlídek (1882–1928), writer, poet and translator
- Jan Trefulka (1929–2012), writer, translator and publicist
- Josef Zelený (1824–1886), painter

=== Sports and other ===
- Jan Blaha (1938–2012), bishop
- Vlastimil Bubník (1931–2015), ice hockey player and footballer
- Karol Divín (1936–2022), Slovak figure skater
- Vlastimil Moravec (1949–1986), cyclist
- Karel Svoboda (1913–1943), table tennis player and resistance fighter
