= Vymazal =

Vymazal (feminine: Vymazalová) is a Czech surname. Notable people with the surname include:

- František Vymazal (1841–1917), Czech philologist
- Hana Vymazalová (born 1978), Czech Egyptologist
- Lenka Vymazalová (born 1959), Czech field hockey player
- Miroslav Vymazal (1952–2002), Czech cyclist
- Matt Vymazal (1985-), American entrepreneur
