= Martínkov =

- Municipality
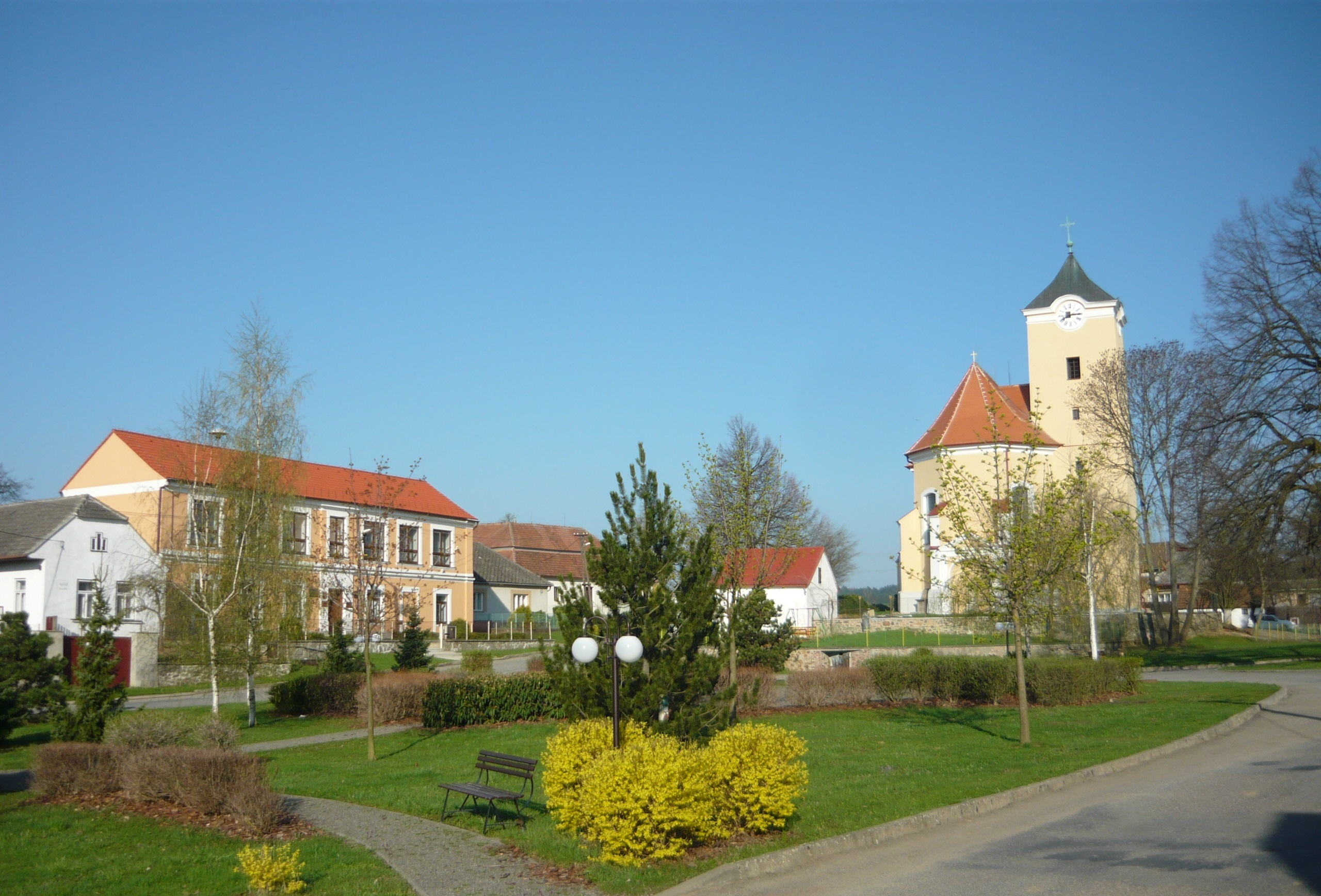
- Centre of Martínkov

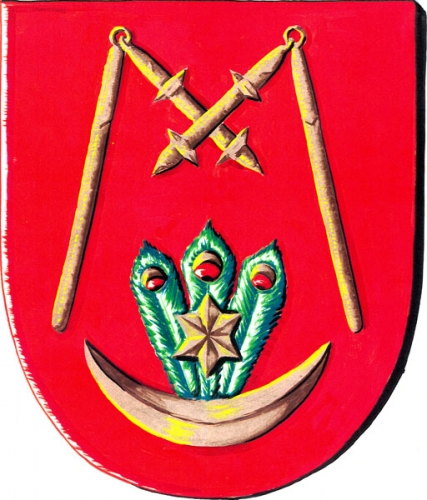
- Flag Coat of arms

- Location in the Czech Republic
- Coordinates: 49°5′48″N 15°42′41″E
- Country: Czech Republic
- Region: Vysočina
- District: Třebíč
- First mentioned: 1320

Area
  - Total: 10.06 km^{2} (3.88 sq mi)
- Elevation: 512 m (1,680 ft)

Population (2026-01-01)
  - Total: 249
  - Density: 24.8/km^{2} (64.1/sq mi)
- Time zone: UTC+1 (CET)
  - Summer (DST): UTC+2 (CEST)
- Postal code: 675 44
- Website: www.martinkov.cz

Martínkov is a municipality and village in Třebíč District in the Vysočina Region of the Czech Republic. It has about 200 inhabitants.

Martínkov lies approximately 18 kilometres (11 mi) south-west of Třebíč, 34 km (21 mi) south of Jihlava, and 144 km (89 mi) south-east of Prague.

== Demographics ==
Historical population
Year	Pop.	±%
1869	670	—
1880	702	+4.8%
1890	715	+1.9%
1900	729	+2.0%
1910	648	−11.1%
1921	635	−2.0%
1930	564	−11.2%
1950	437	−22.5%
1961	440	+0.7%
1970	395	−10.2%
1980	332	−15.9%
1991	302	−9.0%
2001	289	−4.3%
2011	264	−8.7%
2021	227	−14.0%
Source: Censuses

== Notable people ==
- Václav Kosmák (1843–1898), writer and satirist
- Otto Albert Tichý (1890–1973), composer and organist
