= Albert Kutal =

Czech art historian

Albert Kutal (9 January 1904 – 27 December 1976) was a Czech art historian. He established classifying principles of Central European Gothic sculpture as one of the first to study and analyse the medieval art of Bohemia and Moravia, and the influence upon it of Southern European iconography. Kutal were influential in the development of formal analysis in art history in the early 20th century. His magnum opus, still consulted, is Gothic Art in Bohemia and Moravia (published in English translation in 1971).

== Origins and career ==
Kutal was born on 9 January 1904 in Hranice, Moravia, Austria-Hungary. He was born into the family of state geodesist František Kutal. He graduated from secondary school in 1923 and went on to attend the University of Brno (1923–1928), where he was a student of Eugen Dostál and wrote his dissertation on the Romanesque and Gothic sculpture in the arch of the Porta coeli Convent in Tišnov.

He taught at Brno, and briefly lectured in Paris, Brussels, Leuven, Bonn, Vienna and Graz.

Kutal died on 27 December 1976 in Brno. He was buried at the Brno Central Cemetery.

== Works ==
- "Quelques remarques sur la sculpture gothique en Boheme", in Actes du XIX. Congres international d'histoire de l'art (Paris, 1959), pp. 100–104.
- České gotické sochařstvi, 1350–1450 (Prague, 1962)
- "La 'Belle Madone' de Budapest" in Bulletin du Muse'e Hongrois des Beaux-Arts 23 (1963), pp.2I-40.
- Gothic Art in Bohemia and Moravia, translated by Till Gottheiner (London, 1971)
