= Topolany =

- Municipality
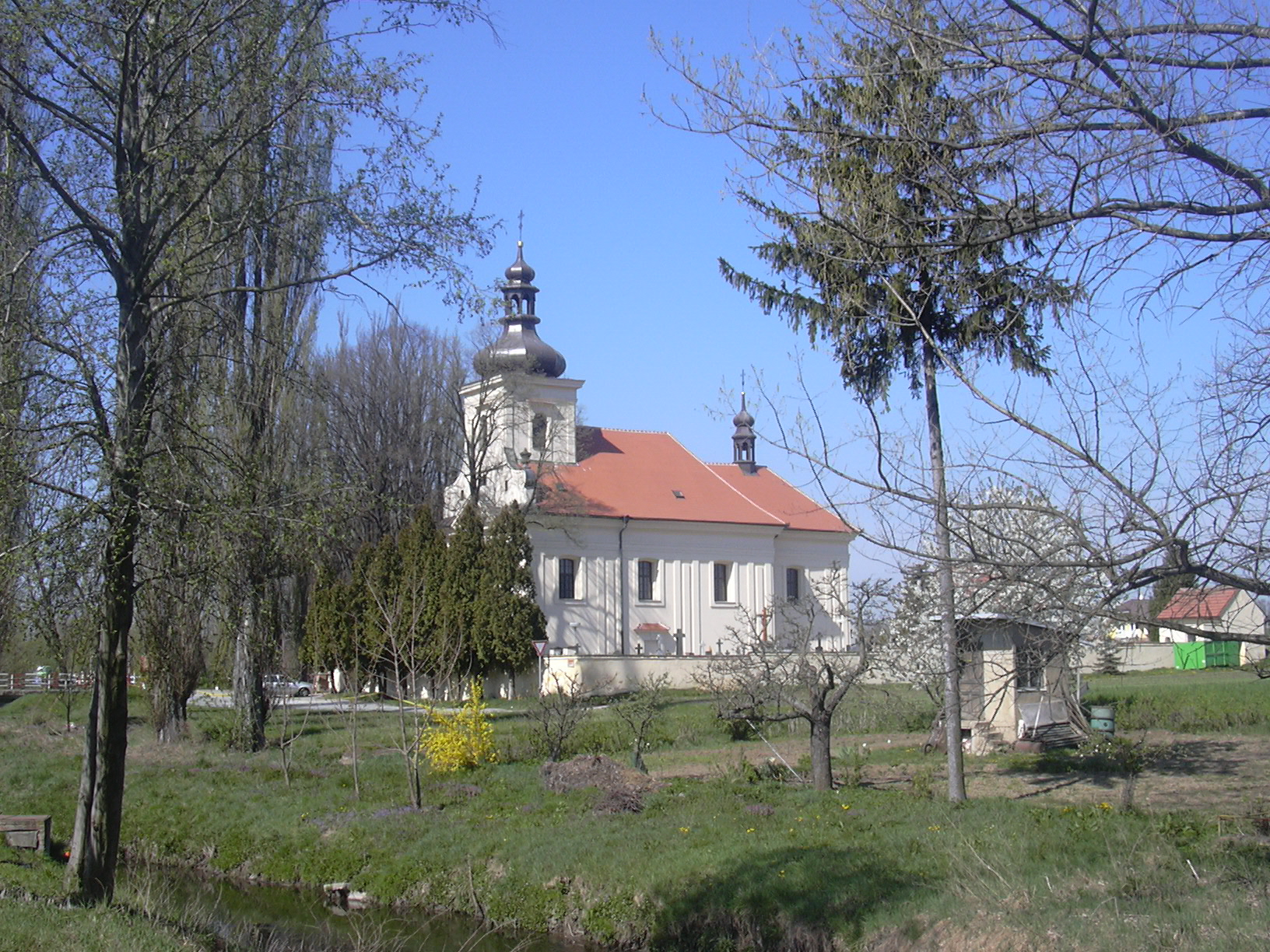
- Church of Saint Nicholas

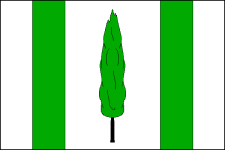
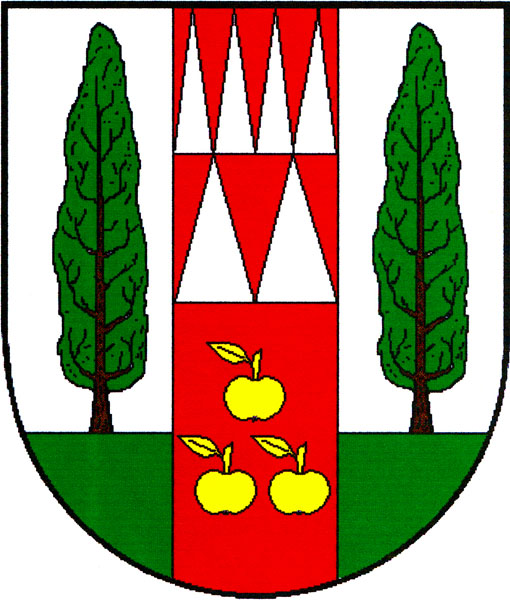
- Flag Coat of arms

- Location in the Czech Republic
- Coordinates: 49°16′39″N 17°2′25″E
- Country: Czech Republic
- Region: South Moravian
- District: Vyškov
- First mentioned: 1349

Area
  - Total: 4.44 km^{2} (1.71 sq mi)
- Elevation: 240 m (790 ft)

Population (2026-01-01)
  - Total: 382
  - Density: 86.0/km^{2} (223/sq mi)
- Time zone: UTC+1 (CET)
  - Summer (DST): UTC+2 (CEST)
- Postal code: 682 01
- Website: www.obectopolany.cz

Topolany is a municipality and village in Vyškov District in the South Moravian Region of the Czech Republic. It has about 400 inhabitants.

Topolany lies approximately 4 kilometres (2 mi) east of Vyškov, 32 km (20 mi) east of Brno, and 210 km (130 mi) south-east of Prague.

== Demographics ==
Historical population
Year	Pop.	±%
1869	338	—
1880	429	+26.9%
1890	395	−7.9%
1900	435	+10.1%
1910	447	+2.8%
1921	460	+2.9%
1930	468	+1.7%
1950	437	−6.6%
1961	424	−3.0%
1970	373	−12.0%
1980	304	−18.5%
1991	274	−9.9%
2001	290	+5.8%
2011	321	+10.7%
2021	342	+6.5%
Source: Censuses

== Notable people ==
- František Vymazal (1841–1917), linguist and writer
