= Vladimír Fischer =

Czech architect

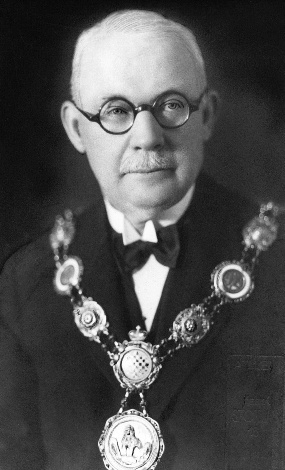
- Born: 4 June 1870; Fryšták, Moravia, Austria-Hungary
- Died: 28 October 1947 (aged 77); Brno, Czechoslovakia
- Education: Czech Technical University in Prague
- Occupation: Architect
- Spouse: Eleonora Osvaldová
- Children: František
- Buildings: New City Hall, Ostrava; Trauma hospital in Ponávka Street, Brno; St. Augustine's Church, Brno; Tišnov Town Hall

Vladimír Fischer (4 June 1870 – 28 October 1947) was a Czech architect, professor and university administrator. He was a major figure in the development of modern architecture in the new state of Czechoslovakia after World War I and trained numerous university architecture students in Brno during the interwar period.

== Early life and training ==
Fischer was born on 4 June 1870 in Fryšták, Moravia, Austria-Hungary. He was the son of Antonín Fischer (1841–1905), who ran a construction company there and later in Holešov, and his wife Františka Rectorová. Vladimír Fischer attended state schools in Brno until 1887, then matriculated to the Czech Technical University in Prague, where he studied engineering construction under prominent Galician-born architect Friedrich Ohmann until 1893. Moving to Vienna, Fischer then studied building technology with the historicist architect Emil Ritter von Förster in 1894–95. Fischer worked as an intern in von Förster's office and later in the 1890s under Hermann Helmer and Ferdinand Fellner in Vienna.

== Career ==
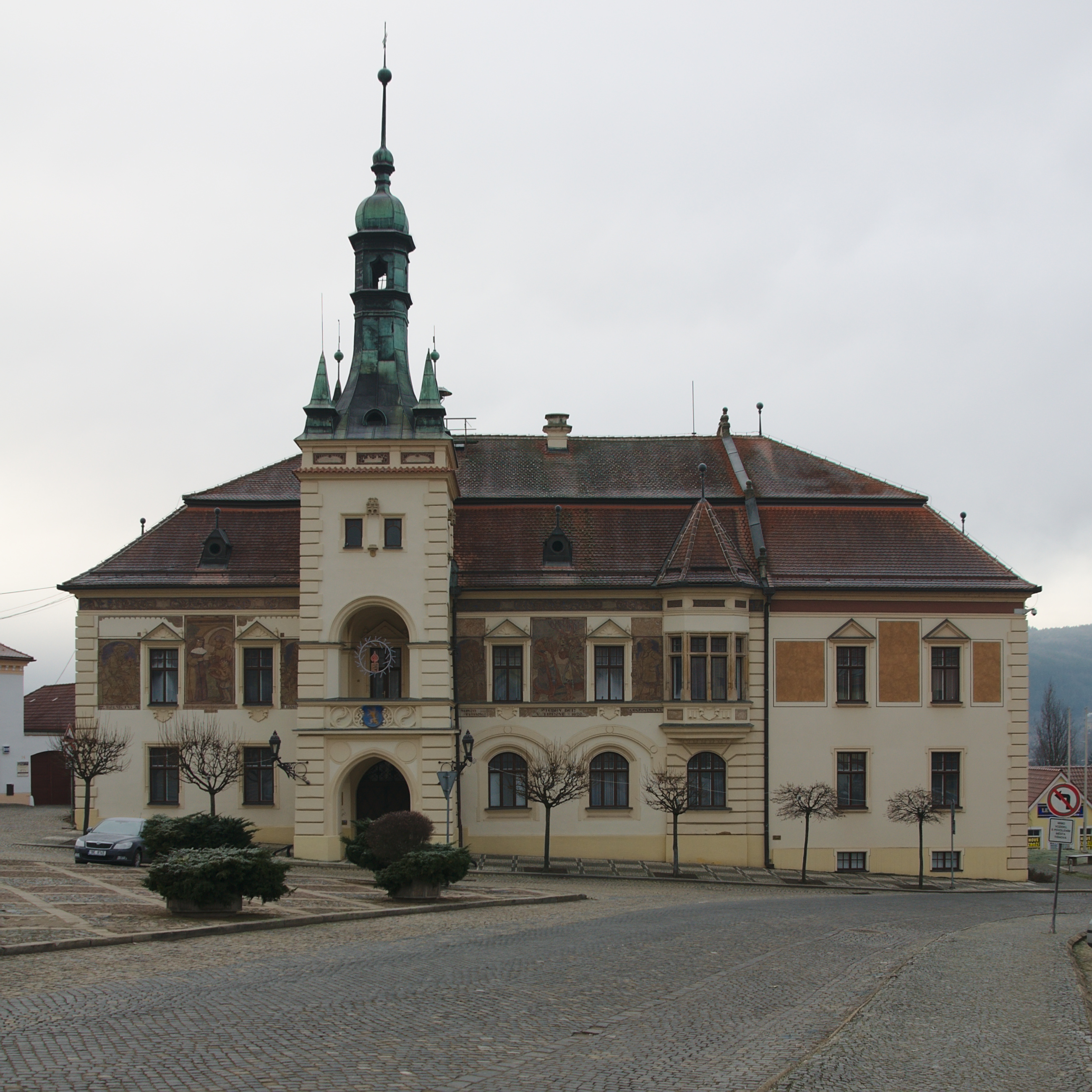
Town hall in Tišnov

In 1899, Fischer returned to South Moravia, where he was commissioned as a civil surveyor in Holešov. He established his own independent architectural practice in Brno soon after the turn of the century, and in 1902 was appointed to the technical department of the Moravian Governorate, initially as a construction adjunct. He was promoted to engineer in 1906, and in 1913 to chief engineer. Fischer soon proved himself a capable and popular designer, garnering commissions for a vast array of different structural types throughout Moravia, beginning with the Fryšták Town Hall (1900–01), followed up with the Tišnov Town Hall (1905–06), and including primary schools, private villas and tenement houses, gymnasiums, churches, vicarages and archbishops' residences, and financial institutions. Probably the most prominent of these was the new headquarters of the Cyrilometodějská zálazna (Cyril and Methodius Credit Union), now the Hotel Grandezza, in Brno, the first Czech financial institution to be based in the city, completed in 1914–15. These works remained strongly historicist and eclectic, with Fischer often choosing from a wide range of well-worn architectural elements, including steeply-hipped roofs, turrets and onion-spired domes reminiscent of central European Baroque architecture.

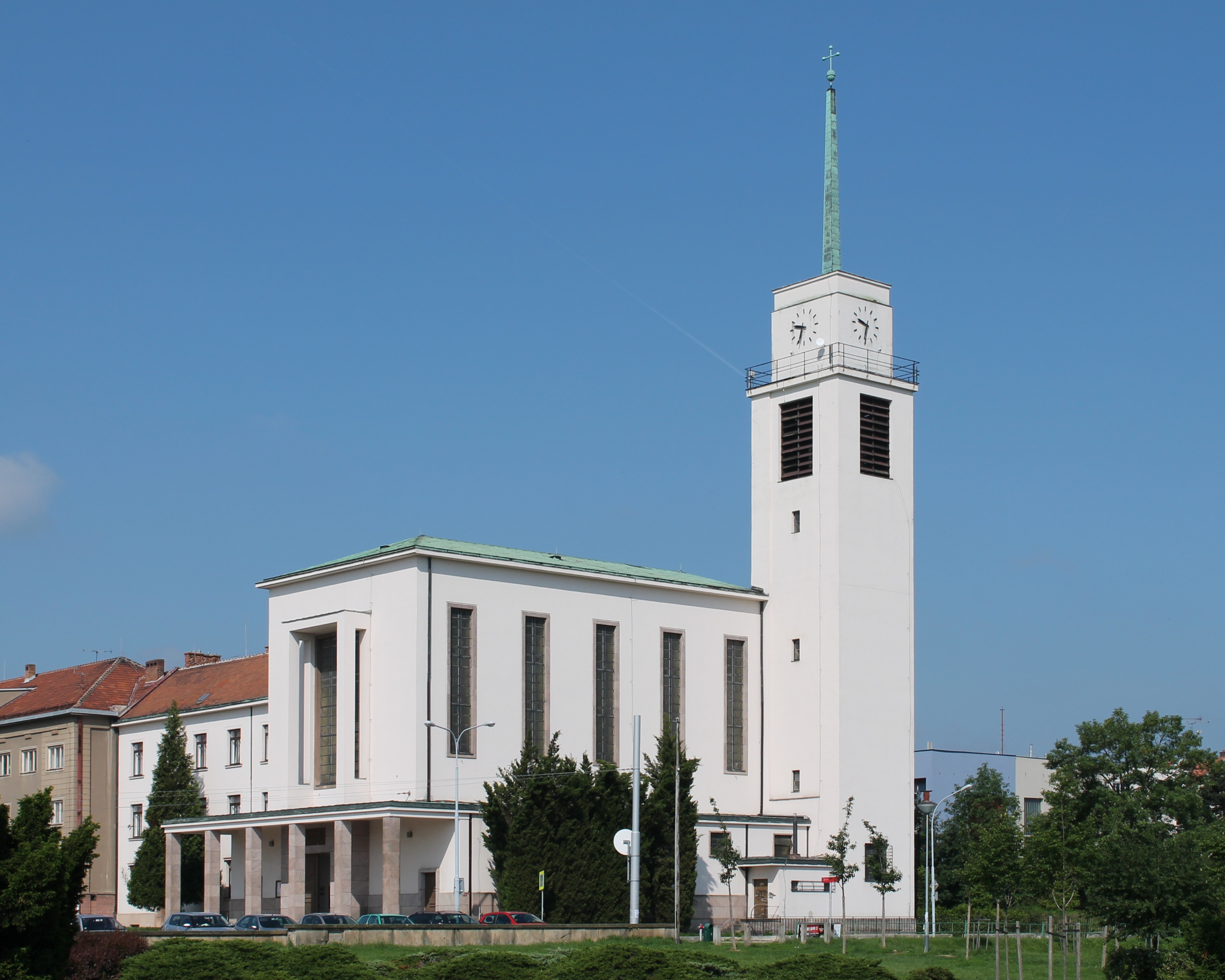
St. Augustine's Church, Brno

During World War I he remained in Brno, becoming the Governorate's chief building commissioner in 1917. Upon the disintegration of Austria-Hungary in November 1918, he became chief building consultant and head of the surface structures department at the provincial political administration in Brno. With the armistice ending World War I, South Moravia became part of the new nation of Czechoslovakia, which Tomas Masaryk had proclaimed in late 1918. The Czech University of Technology (ČVŠT) was established in Brno in 1919, with a department of architecture and civil engineering with cz:Karel Kapka as its first dean. Fischer was appointed to its faculty in 1923, where he served as dean of the faculty of architecture and civil engineering in 1924–25 and 1935–36, eventually becoming the university rector for 1931–32.

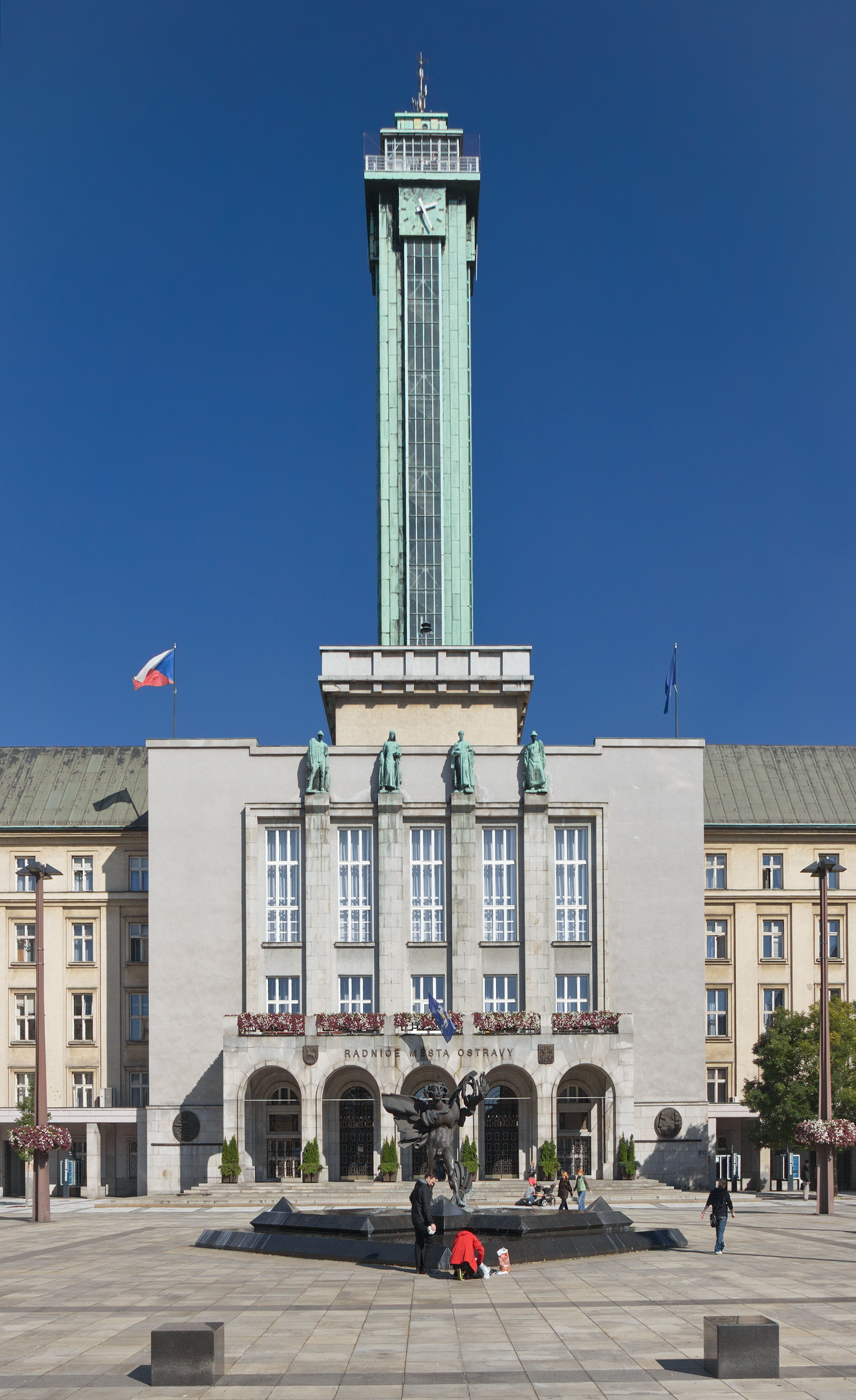
New City Hall, Ostrava, designed by Fischer with Kolář & Rubý

In the second phase of his career during the interwar period, Fischer trained a number of important pupils for the future of Czech architecture. These included Zdeněk Alexa, Vladimir Charous, František Kalivoda, Otakar Oplatek, Josef Kranz, and Bohumil Tureček, among others. Some, such as Alexa, would themselves go on to teaching careers. Beginning in 1919, Fischer also served as the editor of the Czech magazine Architektonický obzor, which later evolved into Architekt SIA, the official periodical of the Society of Czech Engineers and Architects SIA. Fischer also served on several juries for architectural competitions, particularly theatres, including both (1913 and 1937) competitions for the Czech National Theatre in Brno and that for Haná Theatre in Olomouc (1921–22).

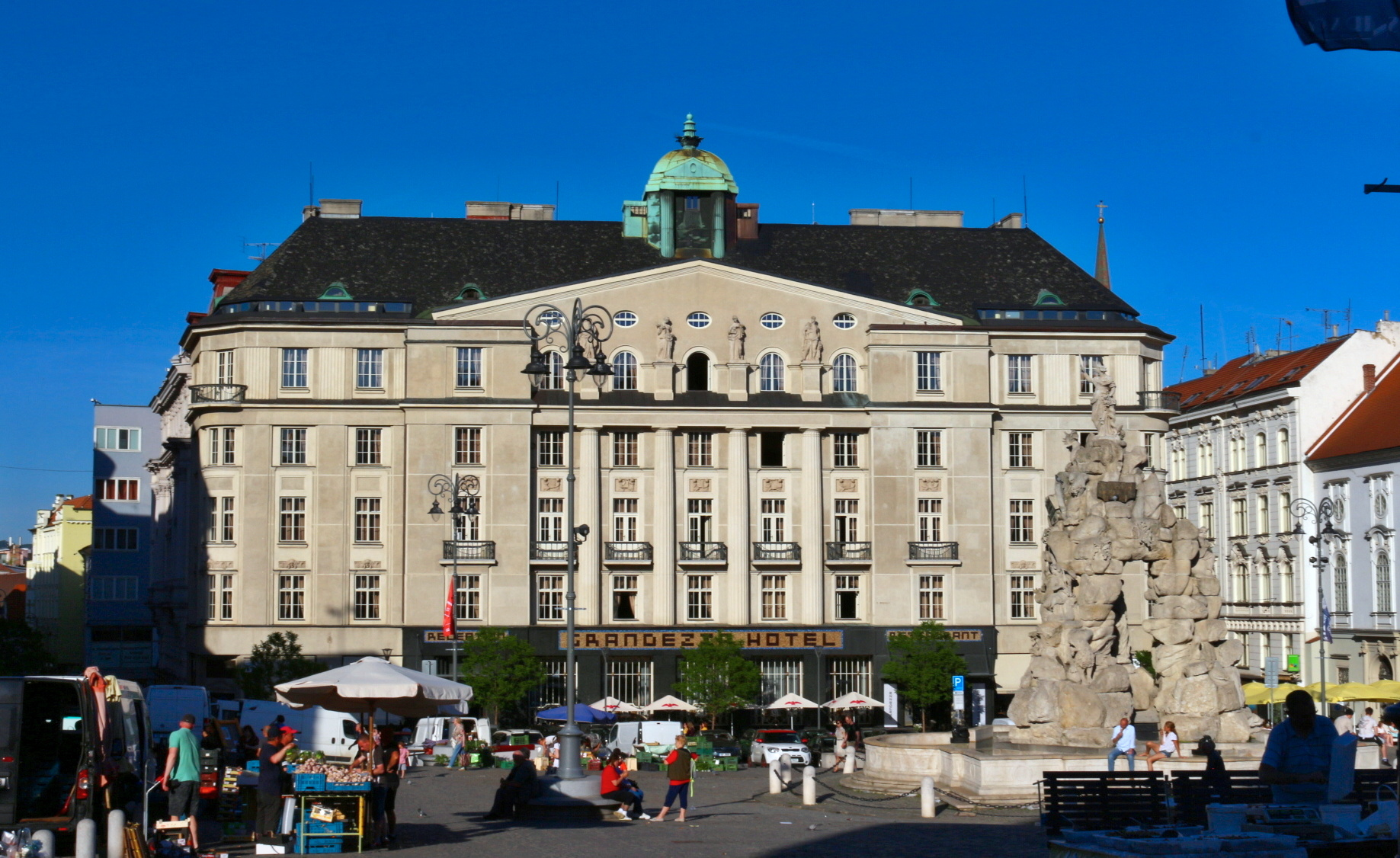
Hotel Grandezza, originally the Cyril and Methodius Credit Union in central Brno (1914–15)

In this period Fischer's own practice also turned decidedly towards the modernist trends then sweeping central Europe, particularly the Functionalist vein of Czech architecture that became popular in the 1920s and 1930s, influenced strongly by the Bauhaus and the brick Expressionist architecture in the Netherlands. This shift began when Fischer won the competition for the new city hall in Ostrava in 1924 but was asked to collaborate with fellow entrants Kolář & Rubý on the final design. The marshy soil underneath the site required a lighter structure than the solid masonry that Fischer had originally intended, and so the finished product used a steel skeleton clad in reinforced concrete, with a copper-and-glass clad clock tower rising from the central pavilion. Fischer's mature modernist designs can be seen in the Trauma Hospital in Brno, designed with Karel Kapka and built from 1930 to 1933; and St. Augustine's Church in Brno (1930–1935), which retains the asymmetry of his earlier works but simplifies them into a minimalist prismatic volume for the sanctuary adjoined by a simple clock tower.

After Czechoslovakia was partitioned by Nazi Germany, between 1939 and 1941, Fischer worked as the conservator of the State Monuments Office in Brno for the Brno-Country District.

== Family and late life ==
Fischer married Eleonora ("Ella") Osvaldová in Smíchov (now Prague) on 2 November 1904. They had one son, František Fischer (born 26 August 1905), who also became an engineer and like his father, faculty of the Czech University of Technology.

Ella Fischerová died in 1930 and was buried at the Brno Central Cemetery, in a grave with a tombstone designed by Fischer. The tombstone contains a richly decorated wrought iron cross from the turn of the 18th and 19th centuries and is protected as a cultural monument. Fischer died in Brno on 28 October 1947, at the age of 77, and was buried at the Brno Central Cemetery with his wife.

== Selected works ==
Fischer's work include:

- Town hall in Fryšták (1900–1901)
- Reconstruction of the castle in Prostějov (1900–1906)
- Gymnasium in Antonínská Street in Brno (1902–1903)
- Augustinian house in Luhačovice (1903–1906)
- Primary school in Tišnov (1903)
- Town hall in Tišnov (1905–1906)
- Hotel U tří králů in Prostějov (1906)
- Archbishop's Palace in Olomouc (1906–1910)
- Primary school in Slavkov u Brna (1907)
- Financial directorate in Olomouc (1908)
- Church of St. Elisabeth of Thuringia in Vnorovy (1908–1909)
- The Swedish House in Smetana Street in Brno (1910)
- School in Veverská Bítýška (1910–1911)
- Villas and tenement houses in Brno in Merhautov, Štefánikov, Smetanov, Botanická, Merhoutová and Cihlářská streets (around 1910)
- Primary school in Holešov (1911)
- Vicarage in Vnorovy (1912)
- Tenement house of J. Stav in Prostějov (1912)
- Church of St. Bartholomew in Rohatec
- Cyril and Methodius Credit Union in Brno (now the, 1913–1915)
- Military chapel of the Sacred Heart of Jesus in Brno (1915)
- Pivovarská banka, Česká street, Brno (1920)
- Reconstruction of the Church of St. Bartholomew, Žebětín district of Brno (1922–1923)
- Church of St. John of Nepomuk, Staré Lískovec district of Brno (1923–1925)
- Girls' dormitory of the Kounice student dormitories, Mučednická street, Brno (1924)
- New City Hall in Ostrava (1924–1930)
- Mechanical-technological pavilion of the Czech Technical University, Veveří Street, Brno (1925–1926)
- Cyrillic monastery with an institution for mentally disabled children and school, Lerchová Street, Brno (1924–1925, 1930)
- Church of the Sacred Heart of God in Vacenovice (1927–1930)
- K. Vágner's department store, Česká Street, Brno (1928)
- Trauma hospital in Ponávka Street in Brno (with Karel Kepka, 1930–1933)
- St. Augustine's Church on Náměstí Míru, Brno (1930–1935)
- Church of Christ the King in Sudoměřice (1930–1932)
- Church of St. Anne in Tvarožná Lhota (1932–1933)
- Oncology hospital (the so-called "House of Comfort") on Žlutý kopec, Brno (with Bedřich Rozehnal, 1931–1934)
- Girls' gymnasium, Lerchova Street, Brno (1935)
