= Prosiměřice =

- Market town
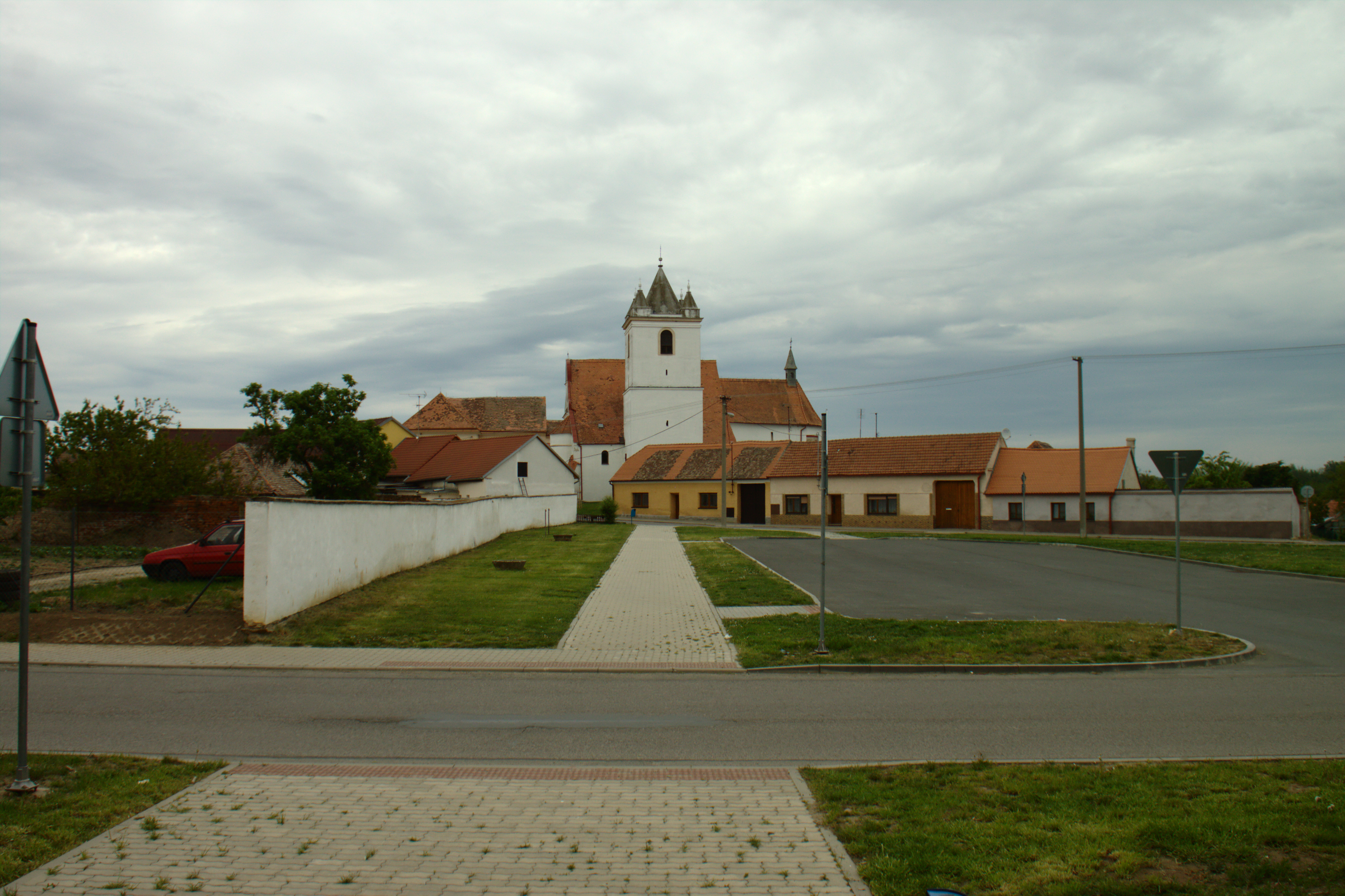
- Centre of Prosiměřice

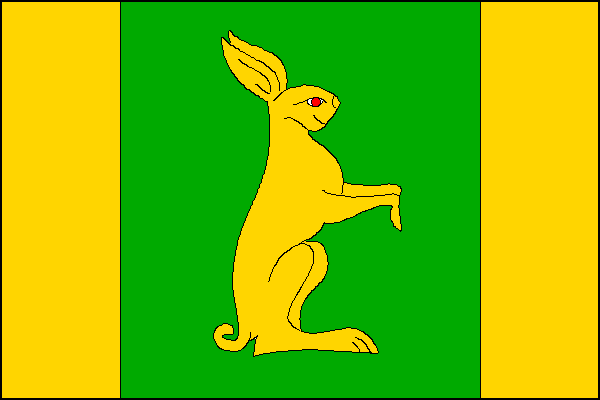
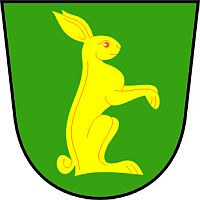
- Flag Coat of arms

- Location in the Czech Republic
- Coordinates: 48°54′10″N 16°11′31″E
- Country: Czech Republic
- Region: South Moravian
- District: Znojmo
- First mentioned: 1226

Area
  - Total: 6.45 km^{2} (2.49 sq mi)
- Elevation: 205 m (673 ft)

Population (2026-01-01)
  - Total: 867
  - Density: 134/km^{2} (348/sq mi)
- Time zone: UTC+1 (CET)
  - Summer (DST): UTC+2 (CEST)
- Postal code: 671 61
- Website: www.prosimerice.cz

Prosiměřice (Czech pronunciation: [ˈprosɪmɲɛr̝ɪtsɛ]; German: Prossmeritz) is a market town in Znojmo District in the South Moravian Region of the Czech Republic. It has about 900 inhabitants.

== Etymology ==
The name was probably derived from the personal name Prosimír.

== Geography ==
Prosiměřice is located about 11 kilometres (7 mi) northeast of Znojmo and 43 km (27 mi) southwest of Brno. It lies in an agricultural landscape in the Dyje–Svratka Valley. The highest point is at 254 m (833 ft) above sea level. The market town is situated on the right bank of the Jevišovka River.

== History ==
The first written mention of Prosiměřice is from 1226, in a document according to which King Ottokar I submitted Prosiměřice to the Louka Monastery in exchange for other village. In 1540, Prosiměřice was promoted to a market town by Emperor Ferdinand I.

== Demographics ==
Historical population

Year	Pop.	±%
1869	753	—
1880	830	+10.2%
1890	796	−4.1%
1900	779	−2.1%
1910	737	−5.4%

Year	Pop.	±%
1921	746	+1.2%
1930	759	+1.7%
1950	504	−33.6%
1961	563	+11.7%
1970	519	−7.8%

Year	Pop.	±%
1980	545	+5.0%
1991	597	+9.5%
2001	737	+23.5%
2011	799	+8.4%
2021	849	+6.3%

Source: Censuses

== Economy ==
Prosiměřice is known for viticulture. It lies in the Znojemská wine subregion.

== Transport ==
There are no railways or major roads passing through the municipality.

== Sights ==
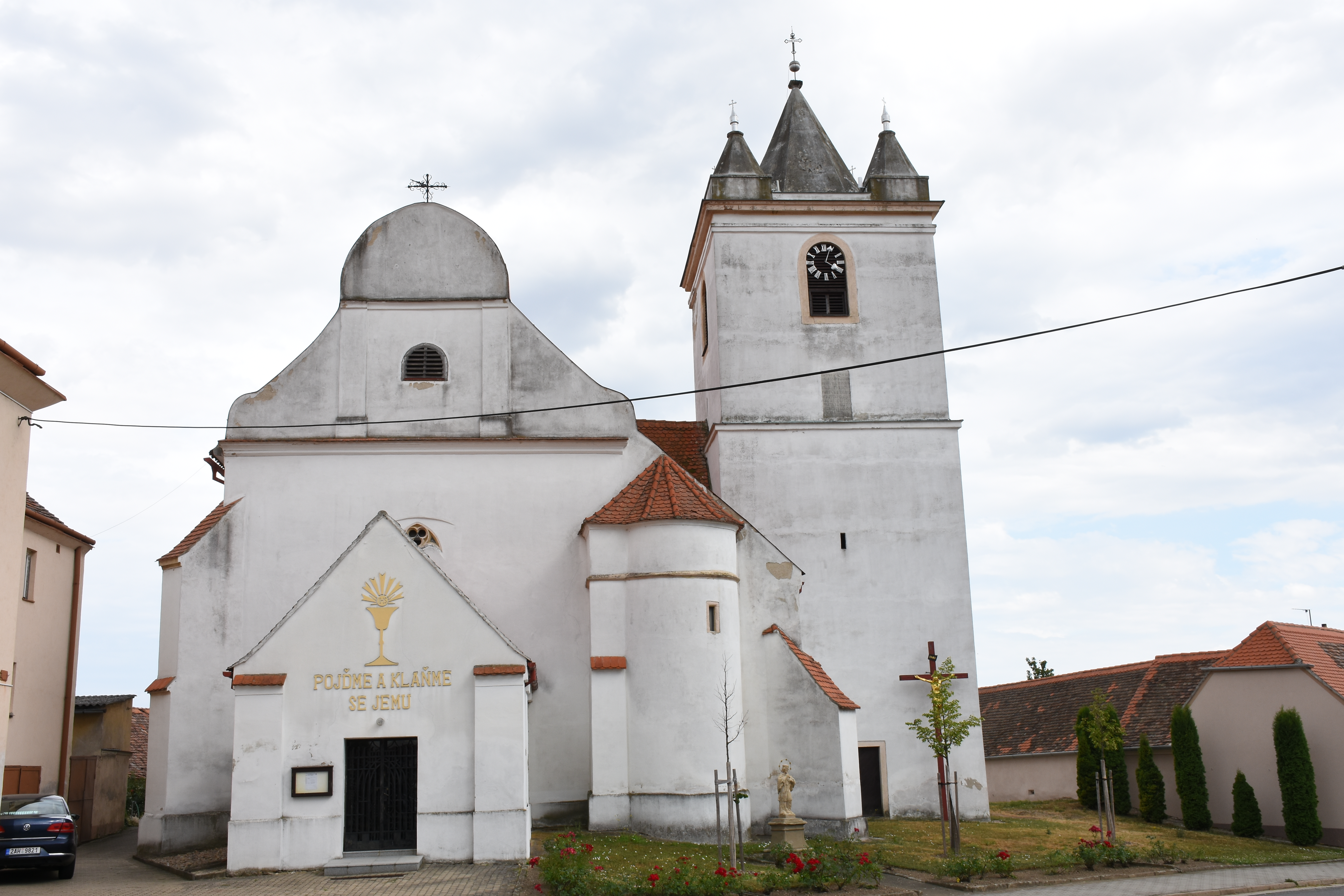
Church of Saint Giles

The main landmark of Prosiměřice is the Church of Saint Giles. It was built in the early Gothic style in the second half of the 13th century. In 1543 and in the 19th century, it was rebuilt into its present form.

== Notable people ==
- Václav Kosmák (1843–1898), writer and satirist; died here
