= List of compositions by Otto Albert Tichý =

The following is a list of compositions by Otto Albert Tichý.

== Chorus ==
=== Cantatas and Mass settings ===
- Kyrie and Gloria (20) for mixed a cappella choir
- Nativité (43)
- The Lord is born (Czech: Narozeni Páně) — Christmas cantata for soli, choir, organ and orchestra
- Mass in honor of St. Aloysius of Gonzaga (Latin: Missa in honorem Sancti Aloisii (44) for four-voice mixed a cappella choir
- Mass in honor of Saint Aloysius of Gonzaga (French: Missa en l'honeur de St. Louis de Gonzague) (46) for four-voice mixed a cappella choir. Issued in Geneva
- Mass in honor of Saint Amadour (Latin: Missa in honorem Sancti Amedei) (48) for four-voice male a cappella choir
- Cantata for first mass (French: Cantate pour premiere messe) (55), for soli, mixed choir, organ
- Saint Vitus (111), for soli, mixed choir, organ (probably motet)
- Kyrie (117) for four-voice mixed choir a capella
- Mass festival in honor of Saint Albertus Magnus (Latin: Missa festival in honorem Sti Alberti Magni) (140), for four-voice mixed a cappella choir
- Mass in honor of Saint Adalbert (Latin: Missa in honorem Sti Adalberti) (152), for four-voice mixed a cappella choir
- Pastoral Mass in honor of the Infant Jesus in Prague (Latin: Missa pastoralis in honorem Jesu Infantis in Praga) (166), for four-voice mixed choir and organ
- Pastoral Mass in honor of the Infant Jesus in Prague (Latin: Missa pastoralis in honorem Jesu Infantis in Praga) (166b) orchestral version (partiture and voices)
- Children Christmas Mass Czech: Dětská vánoční mše) (171b), festive mass for the honour and praise Jesus Christ the King
- Short Mass (Latin: Missa brevis) (201), for four-voice mixed a cappella choir (separate voices)
- Jesus Christ the friend - Saint John the Baptist (Czech: Jezu Kriste příteli – svatý Jene Křtiteli) (204), for four-voice mixed choir and organ
- Mass in C (Latin: Missa de quadragessime) (222), for three to four voice mixed a cappella choir
- Mass without Credo
- Mass in honor of the Blessed Virgin Mary (Latin: Missa in honorem Beatae Mariae Virginae in coelum Assumptae) (225), in the archive of St. Vitus Cathedral in Prague. Festival liturgie in Czech

=== Songs – Czech mass ordinarium (259) ===
- Gloria in excelsis Deo (289), Christmas cantata, pastoral mass for soli, choir, organ and orchestra on the words of F. Rejl
- To the Czech country (314), cantata with two melodramas
- Mixed choirs, song of the Catholic youth (Czech: Smíšené sbory, French: Chant de jeunesse catolique), arrangement for mixed choir with piano
- Saint Wenceslas (Czech: Svatý Václave) (28) for tenor, bass, choir and piano (organ) adaptation of chant from the 13th century

== 1922 ==
- Ave Maria (33b), in F-sharp minor, arrangement for four-voice mixed a cappella choir
- You are Peter (Latin: Tu es Petrus) (35), motet for four-voice mixed a cappella choir
- Under your protection (Latin: Sub tuum praesidium) (36), motet for four-voice mixed a cappella choir
- Only therefore apply to me (Latin: Tantum ergo a Postula a me) (52), arrangement for two four-voice mixed choirs, with organ
- At Notre-Dame du Chêne (French: A Notre-Dame du Chêne) (54), hymn arrangement for mixed choir with soli and organ accompaniment
- From the depths (Latin: De profundis) (56), arrangement for a four-voice mixed a cappella choir
- You are Peter (Latin: Tu es Petrus) (61), motet for four-voice mixed choir with organ
- Rejoice in God (Latin: Jubilate Deo) (64), motet for four-voice mixed a cappella choir (published in Praporci in 1950)
- Little Antoine is dead (French: Petit Antoine est mort) (65), arrangement for soli, choir, and piano
- You are Peter (Latin: Tu es Petrus) (66), motet for four-voice mixed a cappella choir
- Oh how sweet (Latin: O quam suavis) (66), motet for four-voice mixed a cappella choir
- Hymn to Cephas (French: L'hymne a Céphas) (67), arrangement for two soli and a four-voice mixed a cappella choir
- Pange lingua (68), arrangement for four-voice mixed a cappella choir
- Follow in my steps (Latin: Perfice gressus meos) (72), motet for a four-part mixed a cappella choir
- The Prayer to Our Lady (Latin: L'Orayson a Nostre Dame) (82)
- Prayer to the Virgin Mary (Czech: Modlitba k Panně Marii), for soli, mixed choir, and organ
- The Night: Rondeau (French: La Nuit: Rondeau) (90), for four-voice mixed a cappella choir
- Ave Maria (93), for four-voice mixed choir and organ
- Peace be with you (French: La paix soit avec vous) (Czech: Pokoj buď s Vámi (94), arrangement for soli, mixed choir, and organ
- Tantum ergo sacramentum (96), arranement for four-voice mixed choir and organ
- The Priest and the Pope (Latin: Sacerdos et Pontifex) (98), arranagement for a four-voice mixed choir
- Bless the people (Latin: Benedicite gentes) (107), for tenor solo, choir, and organ
- Glor and honor Latin: Gloria et honore) (112)
- Offertory on the feast of St. Wenceslas (Latin: Offertorium in festo Sti Venceslai), motet for four-voice mixed choir and organ
- Salut – IV. Tantum ergo (113), for four-voice mixed a cappella choir
- The heavens are yours (Czech: Tui sunt coeli) (114), motet for Christmas Eve, arrangement for four-voice mixed choir with organ
- Place your trust in the Shepherd (Czech: Vy pastýřové stávéte) (115), Hanácká carol – arrangement for seven-voice mixed a cappella choir
- Three Kings (Czech: Tři Králové) (116), based on an old French carol, arrangement for a four-voice mixed choir
- Hail, most devout soul! (Czech: Ave, anima piisima!) (121), arrangement for four-voice mixed a cappella choir

== 1936 ==
- Hello, Starfish (Czech: Zdrávas, Hvězdo mořská) (109), arrangement for unison choir with organ
- They will be brought (Czech: Přivedeny budou) (128), motet for three female a cappella voices

== 1939 ==
- To the Blessed Zdislava (Czech: K blahoslavené Zdislavě) (125), for four-voice mixed a capella choir
- Beatus vir (129), motet for four-voice choir with organ; co-written with Bedřich Antonín Wiedermann
- Confirm this, God (Latin: Confirma hoc, Deus) (130), motet for four-voice mixed choir and brass quintet
- With joy from the bottom of my heart... (Czech: Radostně již z duše celé...) (133b), Christmas mass arranegment for four-voice mixed choir, small orchestra, and organ
- Ecce sacerdos magnus (137), arrangement for four-voice mixed choir and organ
- As in the holocaust (Latin: Sicut in holocaustis) (138), arrangement for four-voice mixed choir and organ
- Ecce sacerdos magnus (141), arrangement for four-voice mixed a cappella choir
- Rejoice, Queen of Heaven (Czech: Vesel se nebes Královno) (147), antiphon for Easter, arranged for four-voice mixed a cappella choir

== 1940/41 ==
- Hymn to Saint Adalbert (Czech: Povzdech k sv. Vojtěchu) (154), choral arrangement for a female choir composed of three two-part choirs

== 1944 ==
=== Male choirs ===
- Merry Christmas (French: Joyeux Noël) (70), harmony arrangement of a 16th century song, for a four-part male choir
- Traditional Christmases (French: Noëls anciens (70b)
- Three ancient carols (Czech: Tři starodávné koledy), published by Schola Cantorum de Paris
- Lullaby (French: Berceuse) (Czech: Ukolébavka) (76), for soli, choirs, and harmonium
- Leaving mass (French: Sortie de messe) (86), for four-part male a cappella choir
- Ave Maria (87), for four-part male a cappella choir
- Deux "Tantum ergo" (88), arranegmentfor four-part male a cappella choir
- Lament (Latin: Lamento) (89), for four-part male a cappella choir
- Two Moravian motifs (French: Deux motifs moraves) (91), for four-part male a cappella choir
- On high the star is shining, yet I remain an old bachelor (French: La haut l'astre a relui a Moi je reste vieux garcon) (Czech: Tam nahoře zazářila hvězda a Já zůstávám starým chlapcem) (92), for four-part male a cappella choir
- Ave Maria (99), for four-part male a cappella choir
- Give Peace, Lord (Latin: Da Pacem Domine) (101), motet for four-part male a cappella choir
- These lie before the throne of God Latin: Hi sunt ante thronum Dei) (102), motet for four-part male a cappella choir
- O quam suavis (104), motet for four-part male a cappella choir
- You are beautiful, oh, Maria Czech: Všecka jsi krásná, ó, Maria) (110), for four-part male a cappella choir
- Tantum ergo (122), for four-part male a cappella choir
- St. Wenceslas Chorale and Fugue (Czech: Svatováclavský chorál a fuga) (246), for male and children's choir with organ
- Sleep, my golden child (Czech: Spi, mé Dítě zlaté) (291), lullaby from the Christmas Cantata. Arrangement for four-part male a capella choir. Words by F. Rejl.
- Your eyes (Czech: Tvé oči) (309), for four-part male a capella choir; words by F. Rejl
- Maria, lead us (Czech: Maria, veď nás) (311), for four-part male a capella choir

=== Female, children and unison choirs ===
- We flee to Your protection (Czech: Pod ochranu Tvou se utíkáme) (108), for unison choir and organ

== 1946 ==
- Confirm this, God (Latin: Confirma hoc, Deus) (148), motet for four-voice mixed choir and organ
- Prayer to Saint Adalbert (Czech: Prosba k sv. Vojtěchu) (155), for four-voice mixed a cappella choir, from the second collection of male choirs
- Reaper's chant (Czech: Chorál ženců) (156), for four-voice mixed a cappella choir, words by P. Kleta
- Improperium and Song of Saint Joseph (Czech: Improperium a Píseň k sv. Josefu) (160), for four-voice mixed choir and organ
- Six Christmas carols (Czech: Šest vánočních písní) (171), five songs for solo and organ, sixth song for four-part mixed choir and organ
- This is the day which the Lord has made (Latin: Haec dies, quam fecit Dominus) (173), motet for four-part male a cappella choir
- Praise the Lord (Latin: Laudete dominum) (175b), motet for four-part male a cappella choir
- The heavens are yours (Latin: Tui sunt caeli) (198), offertory for the third Mass of the Nativity of the Lord, for four-voice mixed choir and organ
- Panis angelicus (203), motet for four-voice mixed a cappella choir
- 5× Tantum ergo (214)
  - Three Kings Tantum ergo (Czech: Tříkrálové Tantum ergo), for four-part male a cappella choir
  - Tantum ergo to Our Lady of the Angels (Czech: Tantum ergo k Panně Marii Andělské), for four-part mixed a cappella choir
  - Tantum dorické (Lento), for four-part male a cappella choir
  - Tantum ergo (Moderato), for four-part mixed a cappella choir
  - Tantum ergo (Lento), for four-part male a cappella choir
- The right hand of the Lord has done virtuous things (Latin: Dextera Domini fecit virtutem) (215), motet for four-voice mixed a cappella choir
- I. and II. Tantum ergo (217), for four-voice mixed a cappella choir
- To you, Lord, I have lifted (Latin: Ad te Domine, levavi) (227), offertory of the First Sunday of Advent, motet for four-voice mixed a cappella choir
- I continue, God (Latin: Continuo hoc Deus) (228), offertory for the Feast of Pentecost, motet for mixed choir, brass quintet, and organ
- You have blessed your land, oh Lord (Latin: Benedixisti Domine, Terrem tuam) (229), offertory for the third Sunday of Advent, for mixed choir and organ
- God, you have converted us (Latin: Deus, tu convertus) (230), offertory for the second Sunday of Advent, motet for mixed choir and organ
- The sea will dominate (Latin: Dominabitur a mari) in C major (231a), gradual for the Feast of Our Lord Jesus Christ the King, for mixed choir
- The sea will dominate (Latin: Dominabitur a mari) in F-sharp minor (231b), gradual for the Feast of Our Lord Jesus Christ the King, for mixed choir
- Exalt him (Latin: Exaltate eum) (232), Offertory for the Mass for the election of the Holy Pontiff, motet for mixed choir
- Praise the soul (Latin: Lauda anima) (233), for the Sunday after Easter, for a mixed choir
- No duplicated conversation (Latin: Non duplices sermonem) (234), for mixed choir and organ
- Moses is praying (Latin: Precatus est Moyzes) (235), offeratory for the third Sunday after Pentecost, for mixed choir and organ
- Choruses to the Body of God (Czech: Sbory k Božímu tělu) (236), I am the living bread, my flesh, oh how sweet, oh sacred banquet, for mixed choir
- The earth trembles (Latin: Terra tremuit) (237), for mixed choir
- Lord, have mercy on us (Czech: Hospodine, pomiluj ny) (238a), for mixed choir
- Hail, Queen (Czech: Zdrávas královno) (238b), for mixed choir
- Saint Wenceslas (Czech: Svatý Václave) (238c), for mixed choir
- The heavens belong to you (Latin: Tui sunt caeli) (239), in F major, for mixed choir
- On the feast of our Most High Lord Archbishop Joseph Beran (Latin: Ad festum nostri Celsissimi Domini Archiepiscopi Joseph Beran) (242), for four-voice mixed a cappella choir
- He commanded his angels: give (Latin: Angelis suis mandavit dete) (274), motet for mixed a cappella choir
- Let them not partake of holy things (Latin: Non participentur sancta) (278), motet for four-voice mixed a cappella choir
- Invocation (Latin: Invokace) (280), for four-voice mixed a cappella choir
- Four praises of Christ (Czech: Čtyři chvály Krista) (294), for soli, mixed choir and organ. Words by F. Rejl
- You are our eternal King and God (Czech: Tys věčný Král a Bůh náš) (296), for soli, mixed choir and organ. Words by F. Rejl
- To the Czech country (Czech: Pozdravy rodné zemi) (303)
  1. Under Zvičina (Czech: Pod Zvičinou), for solo, with piano accompaniment
  2. Domov, for solo, with piano accompaniment
  3. The ballad of the apple blossom (Czech: Balada o jabloňovém květu), for soli, mixed choir, and piano

== 1947 ==
- It is fitting for man at all times (Latin: Decet huius cunctis horis) (161), for unison choir and organ
- Three Christmas carols (Czech: Tři vánoční písně) (324), for female duet. Published in Praporci in 1949.
- Between the ox and the grey donkey (French: Entre le boef et l'ane gris), women's choir

== 1952 ==
- Improvisation, for grand organ

== 1972 ==
- God made the world (Latin: Deus firmavit orbem terrae) (304), motet for four-voice mixed a cappella choir
- Three Czechoslovak songs (Czech: Trois chansones tchécoslovaques) (307), harmonization for four-voice mixed a cappella choir
- Three songs of Czechoslovak servicewomen (Czech: Trois chansones de soldates tchécoslovaques (308), harmonization for a mixed a cappella choir
- Watch over us from on high, Our Mother (French: Regarde-nous d'en-haut, Notre Mere) (317), for four-voice mixed a cappella choir
- Look upon us, our Mother (Czech: Shlédni na nás, Matko naše) (317), for four-voice mixed a cappella choir
- Evening prayer (Czech: Večerní modlitba) (326), for four-part choir

== Sources ==
- Catalog of Copyright Entries. Third Series. Volume 12, Part 5, Number 1. Music. January–June 1958. Washintgon, D.C.: United States Government Publishing Office. 1959 – via Internet Archive.
- Koob, Lindsay (July 2003). "Tichy: Prague Christ Child Mass; motets; Organ Sonata". American Record Guide. Vol. 66, no. 4. p. 167. ProQuest 223387796.
- Velek, Viktor (2015). "The Saint Wenceslas tradition during the time of the Swastika". Czech Music. Vol. 15, no. 1. pp. 29–39.
