= Otto Albert Tichý =

Czech composer, teacher and organist

- Born: August 14, 1890; Martínkov, Moravia
- Died: October 21, 1973 (aged 83); Prague

Otto Albert Tichý (14 August 1890 – 21 October 1973) was a Czech composer, teacher and organist.

== Early life and education ==
Otto Albert Tichý was born in Martínkov, Moravia, in a Catholic family of a provincial teacher. He studied different instruments and played the organ from an early age. He began composing as a boy. He became a devoted student of Vítězslav Novák at the Prague Conservatory. However, he interrupted his study to work nine years at the most spiritual publisher of this time, Josef Florian, solely for room and board. He joined Florian's Studio in 1908.

In 1919 he resumed his study as a pupil of French composer and teacher Vincent d'Indy at the Schola Cantorum. Tichý initially studied organ, Gregorian chant and composition, then contrapuntalism and concord. At Schola Cantorum he got the opportunity to experience music from the 16th to the 18th centuries in vocal polyphony.

== Career ==
After he successfully finished his study, he lived as a private music teacher and organist. He spent six years in France and after his marriage moved to Lausanne with his family, where he worked as organist in cathedral Notre Dame and as professor of music at Dominican gymnasium.

In 1936 he returned to Czechoslovakia. After ten years he became choirmaster and organist at St. Vitus Cathedral in Prague and worked as a teacher at Prague Conservatory. He taught choir, Gregorian chant, improvisation, organ accompaniment, conducting, Latin and French. During the Communist period, Tichý remained at Prague Conservatory as a teacher thanks to then Conservatory director Václav Holzknecht and to Tichý's knowledge and skills, especially in languages and music for twenty long years. He left Prague Conservatory at age 75. He also resigned as the organist at St. Vitus. Until the end of his life he wrote music and translated books.

Tichý's works include orchestral music, chamber music, piano music and songs.

== Death and legacy ==
Otto Albert Tichý died at 83, close to his organ-loft.

Few of the composer's works are performed regularly today. His best known pieces are the Missa festival in honorem Sti Alberti Magni, Missa pastoralis in honorem Jesu Infantis in Praga or A Notre-Dame du Chene, and Tantum ergo sacramentum, and Ave Maria, and some other vocal compositions and compositions for small chamber brass or string ensembles.

== Works ==
- List of compositions by Otto Albert Tichý

== Sources ==
- "Kniha narozených a pokřtěných" [Book of births and baptisms]. Moravian regional archive (in Czech).
- "Otto Albert Tichý". Union of Czech singing choirs (in Czech). Archived from the original on 2007-05-13.
- Henderson, John (2005). A Directory of Composers for Organ (3rd, revised and enlarged ed.). Swindon, Wiltshire: John Henderson Publishing Ltd. ISBN 0-952-8050-2-2 – via Internet Archive.
- Koob, Lindsay (July 2003). "Tichy: Prague Christ Child Mass; motets; Organ Sonata". American Record Guide. Vol. 66, no. 4. p. 167. ProQuest 223387796.
- Staňková, Vladimíra; Kořínková, Šárka (2018). "Inspirace, spolupráce a polemiky v korespondenci Jakuba Demla a Jaroslava Durycha" [Inspiration, collaboration and polemics in the correspondence of Jakub Deml and Jaroslav Durych]. Česká literatura (in Czech). 66 (3): 359–394. JSTOR 45117673.
