= Fryšták =

- Town
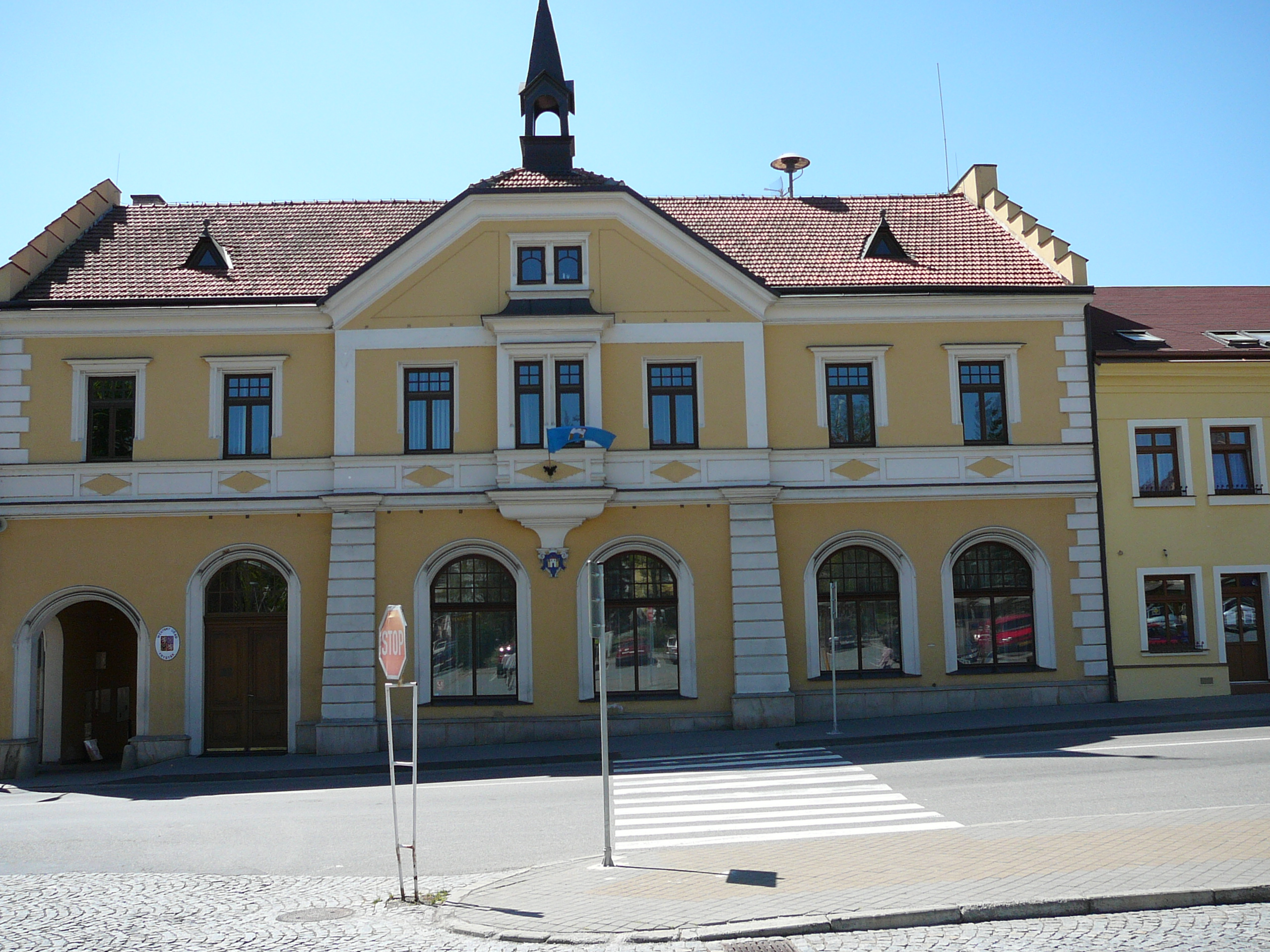
- Town hall

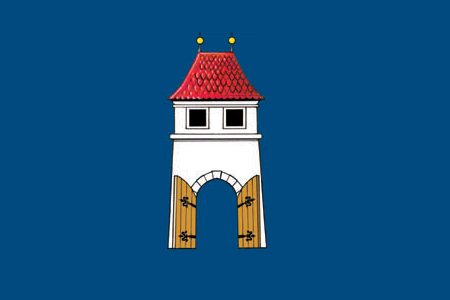
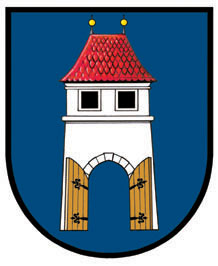
- Flag Coat of arms

- Location in the Czech Republic
- Coordinates: 49°17′6″N 17°41′3″E
- Country: Czech Republic
- Region: Zlín
- District: Zlín
- First mentioned: 1356

Government
  - Mayor: Pavel Gálík

Area
  - Total: 24.17 km^{2} (9.33 sq mi)
- Elevation: 271 m (889 ft)

Population (2026-01-01)
  - Total: 3,826
  - Density: 158.3/km^{2} (410.0/sq mi)
- Time zone: UTC+1 (CET)
  - Summer (DST): UTC+2 (CEST)
- Postal code: 763 16
- Website: www.frystak.cz

Fryšták (Czech pronunciation: [ˈfrɪʃtaːk]; German: Freistadtl) is a town in Zlín District in the Zlín Region of the Czech Republic. It has about 3,800 inhabitants. The town is located on the stream Fryštácký potok, on the border of the Hostýn-Vsetín Mountains and Vizovice Highlands. The historic town centre is well preserved and is protected as an urban monument zone.

== Administrative division ==
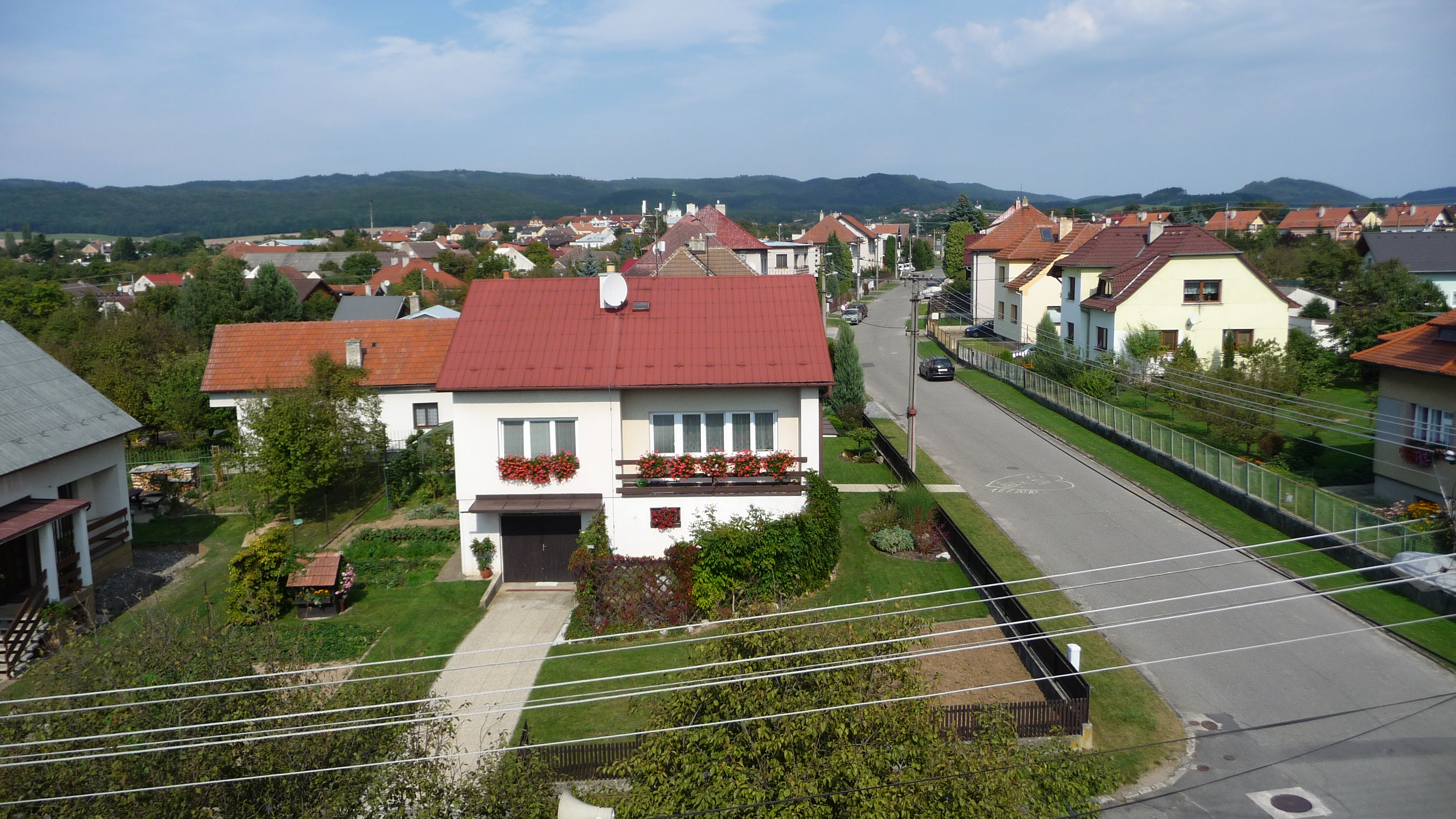
Dolní Ves, part of Fryšták

Fryšták consists of four municipal parts (in brackets population according to the 2021 census):

- Fryšták (1,470)
- Dolní Ves (513)
- Horní Ves (1,403)
- Vítová (275)

== Etymology ==
The name is a Czech transliteration of the German words frei stadt (i.e. 'free town').

== Geography ==
Fryšták is located about 5 kilometres (3 mi) north of Zlín. The northern part of the municipal territory lies in the Hostýn-Vsetín Mountains and rest of the territory lies in the Vizovice Highlands. The highest point is at 566 m (1,857 ft) above sea level. Fryšták lies on the border between the ethnographic regions of Moravian Wallachia and Haná.

The town is situated lies on the stream Fryštácký potok. The Fryšták Reservoir was built on this stream in 1935–1938 as a water source for Zlín. Since 1997, the reservoir has been protected as a cultural monument.

== History ==
The first written mention of Fryšták is from 15 January 1356 under its Latin name Freystat. In 1382, Fryšták was described as a prosperous town with trade, crafts, a slaughterhouse and a spa. The prosperity was interrupted by the Thirty Years' War.

By the 19th century, Fryšták was notable for agriculture and wood production. The fire of 1841 caused Fryšták's traditional wooden buildings to be replaced by more modern buildings. By the latter 20th century a contemporary wave of building with construction of many new houses included the installation of modern infrastructure such as natural gas lines and telephone networks.

== Demographics ==
Historical population

Year	Pop.	±%
1869	2,694	—
1880	2,719	+0.9%
1890	2,750	+1.1%
1900	2,709	−1.5%
1910	2,953	+9.0%

Year	Pop.	±%
1921	2,836	−4.0%
1930	2,881	+1.6%
1950	3,059	+6.2%
1961	3,466	+13.3%
1970	3,390	−2.2%

Year	Pop.	±%
1980	3,446	+1.7%
1991	3,299	−4.3%
2001	3,473	+5.3%
2011	3,693	+6.3%
2021	3,661	−0.9%

Source: Censuses

== Transport ==
There are no railways or major roads passing through the town. The II/490 road connects Fryšták with Zlín and Holešov.

== Sights ==
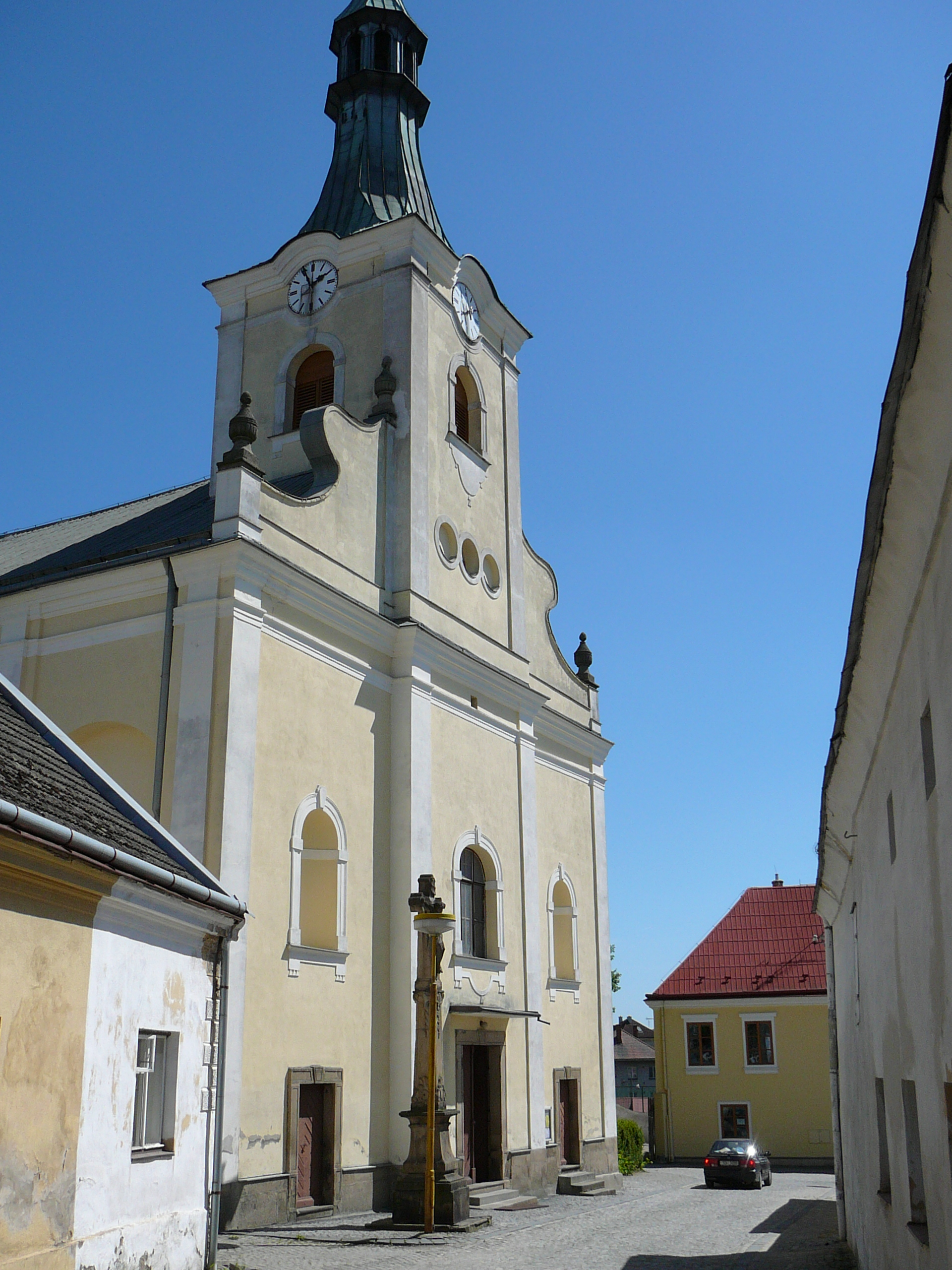
Church of Saint Nicholas

The historic centre of Fryšták is protected as an urban monument zone. The main landmark of the town is the Church of Saint Nicholas. The building is not architecturally clean; it can best be described as a Baroque building. The original part of the church is from the 16th century. In 1820, the building was extended and the bell tower was replaced by a new one. The Baroque stone cross in front of the church dates from 1763.

The first stone town hall was built in Fryšták in 1680. The old building was replaced by a new one in 1900, designed by local native Vladimír Fischer.

== Notable people ==
- Vladimír Fischer (1870–1947), architect
- Jaroslav Kvapil (1892–1958), composer, conductor and pianist
- Břetislav Bakala (1897–1958), conductor, pianist and composer
- Václav Renč (1911–1973), poet, dramatist and translator; lived here
- Dalibor Brázda (1921–2005), Czech-Swiss composer, arranger and conductor

== Twin towns – sister cities ==
Fryšták is twinned with:

- Kanianka, Slovakia
- Muráň, Slovakia
