= Rohatec =

- Municipality
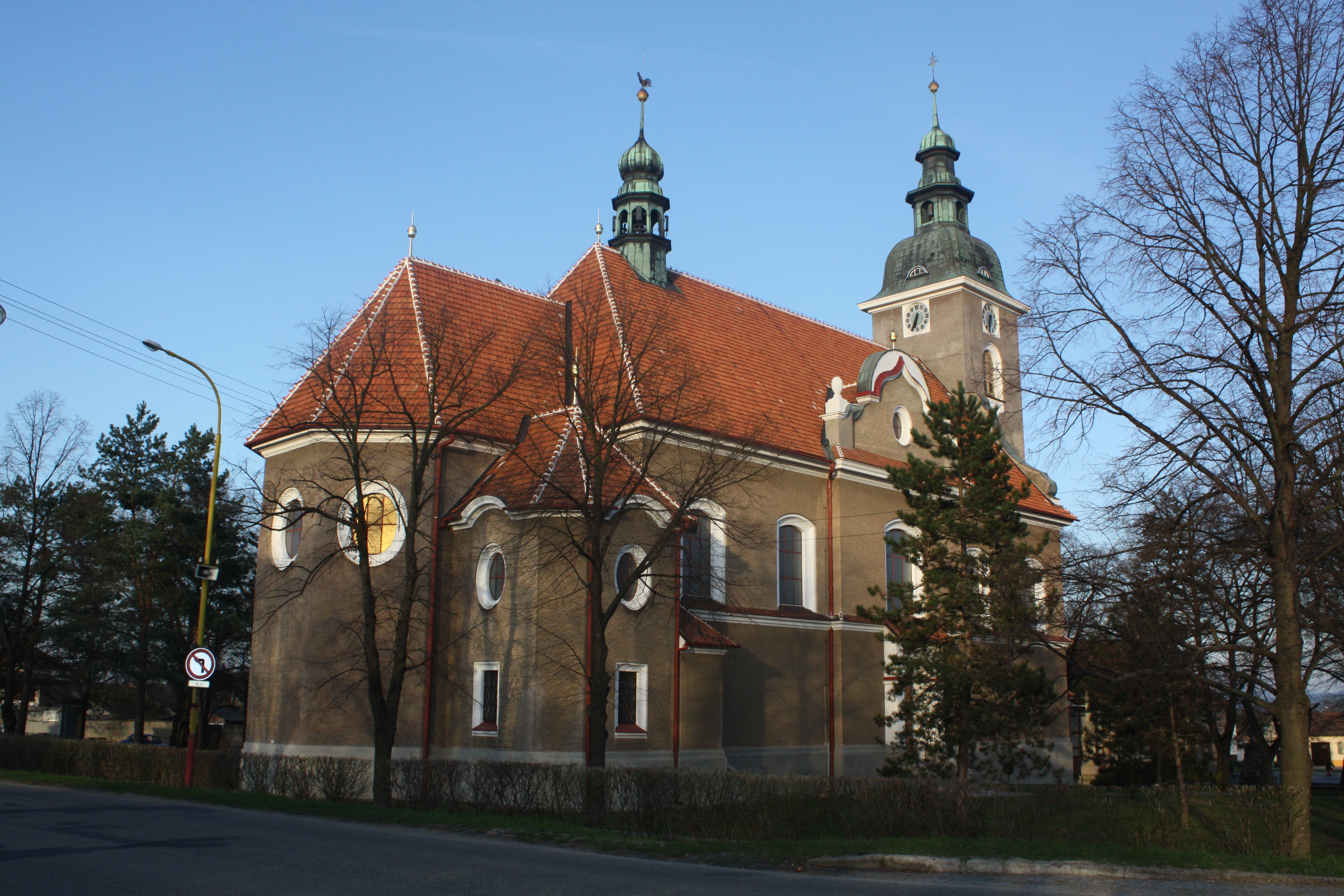
- Church of Saint Bartholomew

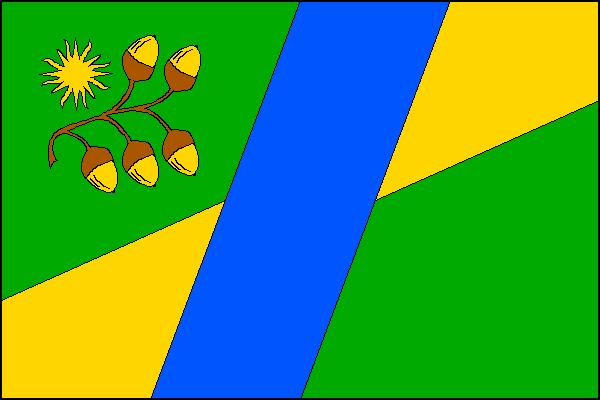
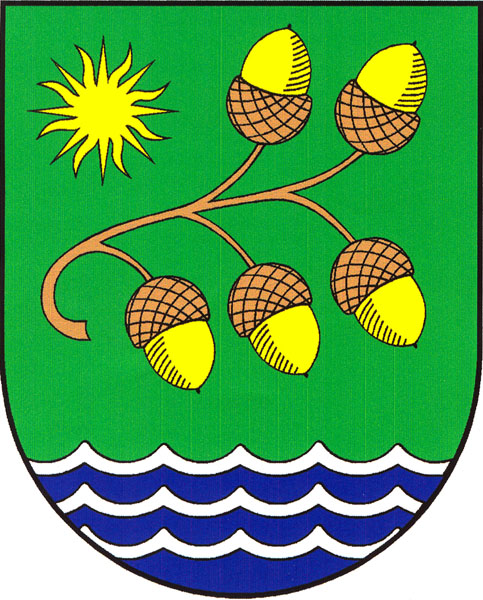
- Flag Coat of arms

- Location in the Czech Republic
- Coordinates: 48°52′49″N 17°11′0″E
- Country: Czech Republic
- Region: South Moravian
- District: Hodonín
- First mentioned: 1270

Area
  - Total: 17.45 km^{2} (6.74 sq mi)
- Elevation: 181 m (594 ft)

Population (2026-01-01)
  - Total: 3,446
  - Density: 197.5/km^{2} (511.5/sq mi)
- Time zone: UTC+1 (CET)
  - Summer (DST): UTC+2 (CEST)
- Postal code: 696 01
- Website: www.rohatec.cz

Rohatec (Czech pronunciation: [ˈroɦatɛts]) is a municipality and village in Hodonín District in the South Moravian Region of the Czech Republic. It has about 3,400 inhabitants.

== Geography ==
Rohatec is located about 6 kilometres (4 mi) northeast of Hodonín and 53 km (33 mi) southeast of Brno, on the border with Slovakia. It lies in a flat landscape in the Lower Morava Valley. The village is situated on the right bank of the Morava River.

== History ==
The first written mention of Rohatec is in a deed of King Ottokar II from 1270. From 1368 until the establishment of an independent municipality in 1848, Rohatec belonged to the Strážnice estate.

== Demographics ==
Historical population

Year	Pop.	±%
1869	1,120	—
1880	1,571	+40.3%
1890	1,663	+5.9%
1900	1,844	+10.9%
1910	2,123	+15.1%

Year	Pop.	±%
1921	2,015	−5.1%
1930	2,233	+10.8%
1950	2,634	+18.0%
1961	3,040	+15.4%
1970	3,041	+0.0%

Year	Pop.	±%
1980	3,203	+5.3%
1991	3,205	+0.1%
2001	3,371	+5.2%
2011	3,475	+3.1%
2021	3,275	−5.8%

Source: Censuses

== Transport ==
The I/55 road from Olomouc to Břeclav runs through the municipality.

Rohatec is located on the railway lines Přerov–Břeclav and Hodonín–Velká nad Veličkou.

== Sights ==
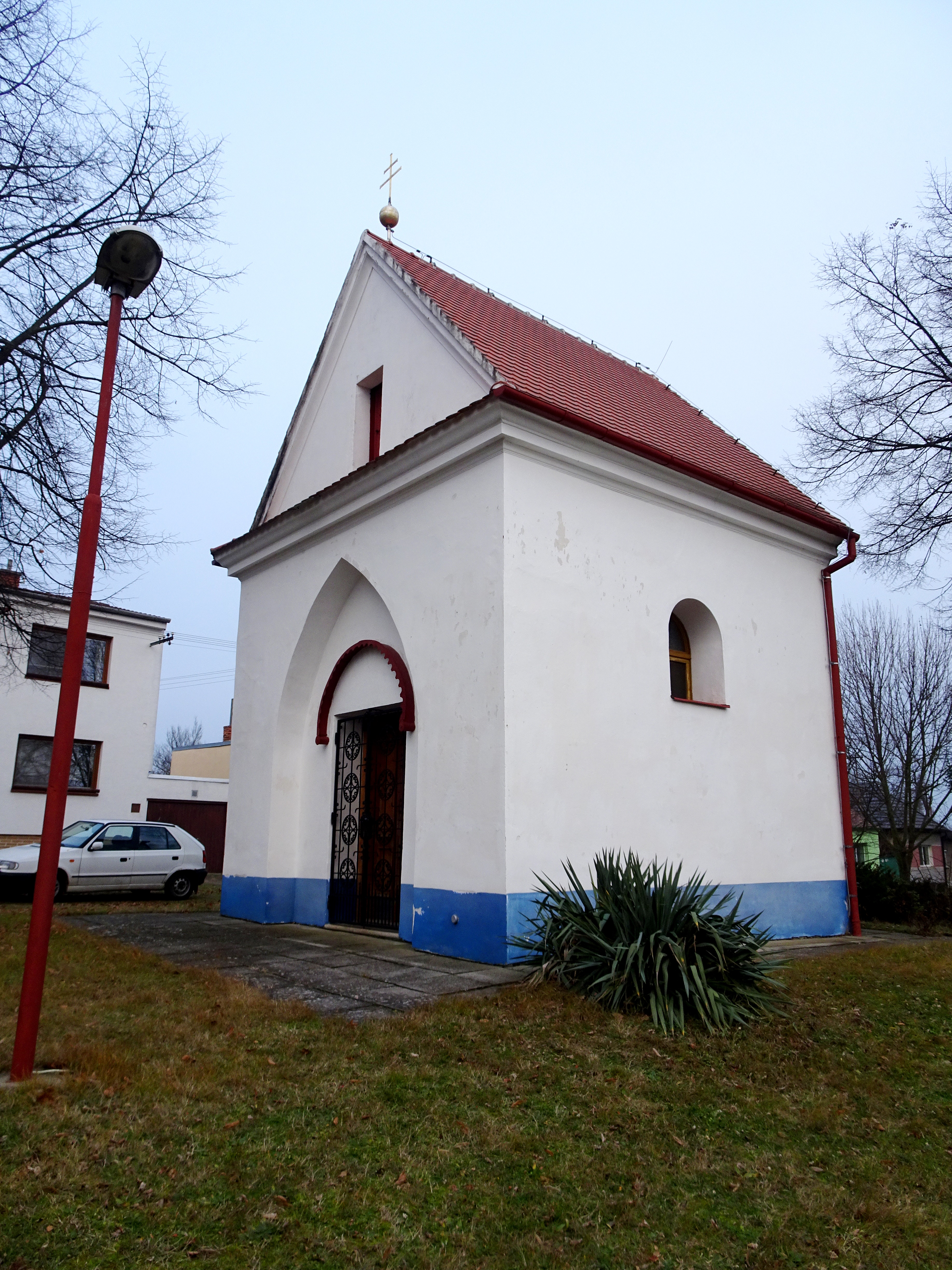
Gothic chapel

The most valuable monument is a chapel that is the chancel of the original Gothic church. It dates from around 1300.

After the old church was demolished in 1903, the Church of Saint Bartholomew was built in 1911 according to the design by the architect Vladimír Fischer. It is the main landmark of Rohatec.

== Notable people ==
- Zdeněk Škromach (born 1956), politician; lives here
- Jakub Kornfeil (born 1993), motorcycle racer; lives here
