= New City Hall, Ostrava =

Town hall complex in Ostrava, Czech Republic

Coordinates: 49°50′30″N 18°17′30″E

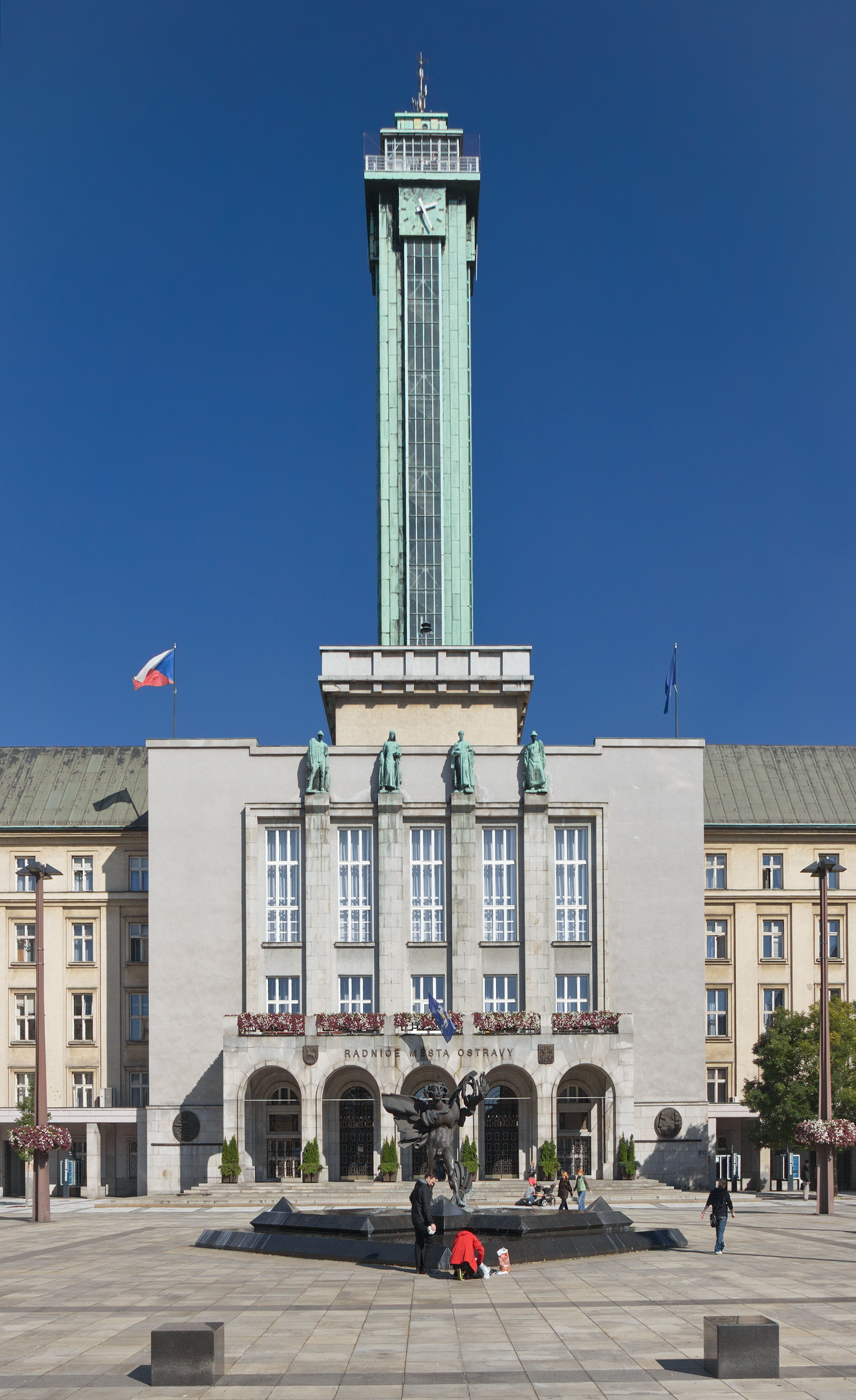
Front view

The New City Hall (Czech: Nová radnice) is a resperentative building in Ostrava in the Czech Republic. It is the most architecturally important and largest town hall complex from the Interwar period in country. It also has a prominent Czech Modernist style clock and observation tower, the tallest from the period. It is located just outside the old town, on the left bank of the Ostravice River, on Sokolská třída.

In 1923, architects Kolář & Rubý took part in the competition for the construction of a new town hall. The jury chose Vladimír Fischer as the best proposal, but suggested that they draw up the final project together. The design changed from more traditional and classical to stylised, illustrating the growing influence of Modernism. Construction work began in November 1924 and the project was completed in 1930. The young architect Karel Kotas was entrusted with the construction management. The building, with a total cost of 52 million CZK, was inaugurated on 28 October 1930 on the occasion of the National Day of the Czechoslovak Republic.

Due to the instability of the subsoil, instead of the planned heavy masonry tower, a lightweight steel structure clad with copper and glass was finally adopted. The tower is 85.6 meters high, the tallest for a town hall in the Czech Republic at the time. Under the tower is placed a unique ribbed reinforced concrete slab. The tower clock weighs more than half a ton, and its dial is 3.5m in diameter. In the tower there is an information centre and a viewing terrace at 73 m. The clock tower terminates the axis of 30. dubna Street.

The new town hall is also the largest town hall complex in the country, with wings on either side enclosing a large square. The north part was to house county administration, with city functions in the south wing. The square has changed its name several times, beginning as Jan Prokes Square, after then mayor of Ostrava, VŘSR Square during the Socialist period, and Prokeš Square again from 1989. A statue to the first President of Czechoslovakia Tomáš Masaryk was originally intended in the centre, but did not eventuate. In 1999 a 3.5m high statue of Icarus was unveiled.

The architecture is stylised classical, with simple vertical piers with a simple copper roof to the flanking three storey wings. The four storey facade of the main section is more elaborate, with an arcaded portico entrance supporting a terrace, with four full height pilasters above, topped by four 3.2 m high bronze statues by Václav Mach which symbolize the four functions of the city: mining, trade, science and metallurgy. There is a passage through the main wing to the riverbank beyond where there is a part open air restaurant.

In the south wing of the building there is a paternoster lift, one of the last in Ostrava. The interior of the public section is lined with marble, mahogany and other rare woods. The vestibule and main staircase is clad in patterned stone, with a brass lighting fixture from the 1970s. On the upper floor there is a large meeting hall, the Council meeting room, and an office for the Mayor of Ostrava, lined with precious timbers, with original modernistic light fittings and furniture.

The New City Hall is one of the most valuable town halls in the country. Since 2024, the building has been protected as a national cultural monument.
