= Pavel Andreyevich Mironov =

Hero of the Soviet Union

- Павел Андреевич Миронов
- Born: 12 December 1919; Russkiye Sarsazy village, Chistopolsky Uyezd, Kazan Governorate, Russian Empire
- Died: 26 April 1945 (aged 25) northwest of Brno, Czechoslovakia
- Military career
- Allegiance: Soviet Union
- Branch: Red Army
- Service years: 1939–1945
- Rank: Junior lieutenant
- Unit: 8th Guards Cavalry Division
- Conflicts: World War II; Bratislava–Brno Offensive †
- Awards: Hero of the Soviet Union; Order of Lenin; Order of the Patriotic War, 2nd class

Pavel Andreyevich Mironov (Russian: Павел Андреевич Миронов; 12 December 1919 – 26 April 1945) was a Red Army Junior Lieutenant and a posthumous Hero of the Soviet Union. Mironov was awarded the title Hero of the Soviet Union and the Order of Lenin for actions during the Bratislava-Brno Offensive.

== Early life ==
Pavel Andreyevich Mironov was born on 12 December 1919 in the village of Russkiye Sarsazy in Chistopolsky Uyezd of Kazan Governorate to a family of peasants. He graduated from seven classes and the factory training school in Chistopol. Mironov worked as an assistant mechanic with the Kama River Shipping Company.

== World War II ==
In October 1939, Mironov was drafted into the Red Army. In 1942, he was in combat and graduated from the junior lieutenant's courses. By April 1945, Mironov was an anti-tank gun platoon commander in the 33rd Guards Cavalry Regiment of the 8th Guards Cavalry Division. He fought in the Bratislava–Brno Offensive. On 26 April 1945, northwest of Brno, his platoon reportedly destroyed a tank, four armored personnel carriers and two artillery pieces. Reportedly, they also killed 50 German soldiers with machine guns. Mironov was killed during this action and was buried in the Brno Central Cemetery. He was awarded the Order of the Patriotic War 2nd class on 23 May. On 15 May 1946, he was awarded the title Hero of the Soviet Union and the Order of Lenin.

== Legacy ==
A street in Chistopol and a ship of the Kama River Shipping Company are named after Mironov.
