= Tučín =

- Municipality
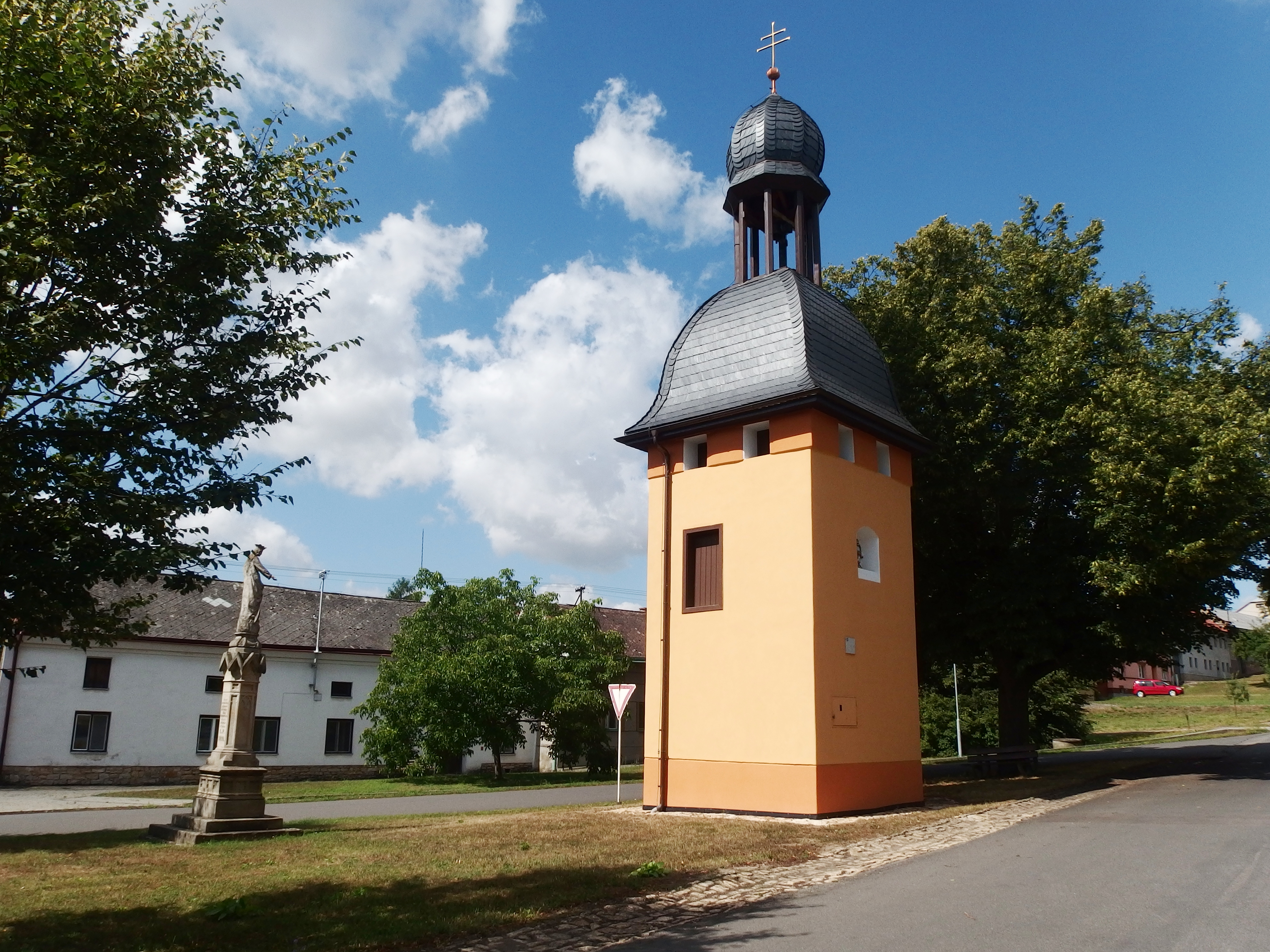
- Centre of Tučín with a statue of the Virgin Mary and a belfry

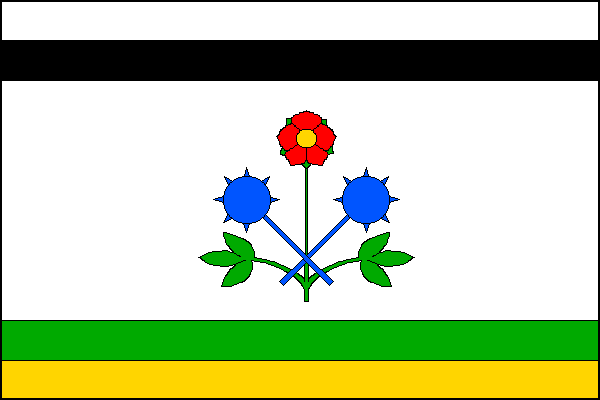
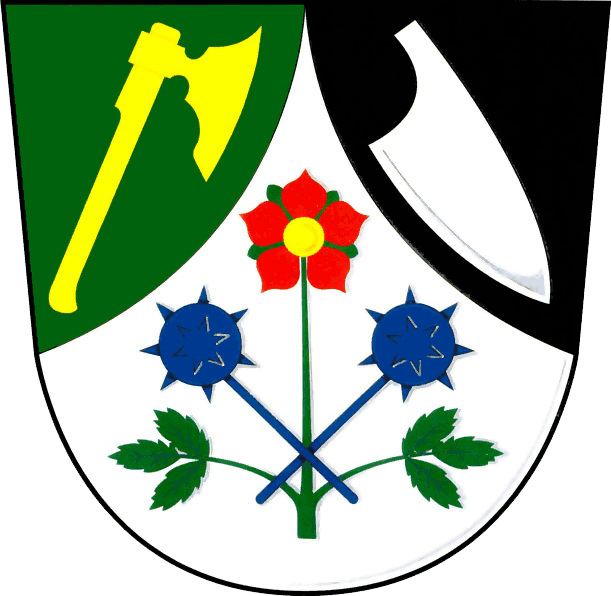
- Flag Coat of arms

- Location in the Czech Republic
- Coordinates: 49°27′14″N 17°30′54″E
- Country: Czech Republic
- Region: Olomouc
- District: Přerov
- First mentioned: 1351

Area
  - Total: 4.87 km^{2} (1.88 sq mi)
- Elevation: 243 m (797 ft)

Population (2026-01-01)
  - Total: 435
  - Density: 89.3/km^{2} (231/sq mi)
- Time zone: UTC+1 (CET)
  - Summer (DST): UTC+2 (CEST)
- Postal code: 751 16
- Website: www.tucin.cz

Tučín is a municipality and village in Přerov District in the Olomouc Region of the Czech Republic. It has about 400 inhabitants.

Tučín lies approximately 5 kilometres (3 mi) east of Přerov, 25 km (16 mi) south-east of Olomouc, and 234 km (145 mi) east of Prague.

== Demographics ==
Historical population
Year	Pop.	±%
1869	394	—
1880	403	+2.3%
1890	480	+19.1%
1900	510	+6.2%
1910	523	+2.5%
1921	590	+12.8%
1930	606	+2.7%
1950	497	−18.0%
1961	515	+3.6%
1970	514	−0.2%
1980	476	−7.4%
1991	456	−4.2%
2001	422	−7.5%
2011	430	+1.9%
2021	424	−1.4%
Source: Censuses

== Notable people ==
- Tomáš Eduard Šilinger (1866–1913), politician and journalist
