= Čestmír Gregor =

Czech composer, theorist and publicist

Čestmír Gregor (14 May 1926 – 2 March 2011) was a Czech composer, theorist and publicist. His career as a composer lasted from 1942 to 2005, and encompassed a variety of styles and formats.

== Life and career ==
Čestmír Gregor was born in Brno, the son of composer and theorist Josef Gregor (1892-1957) and Františka Gregorová Koldová. After graduating from grammar school, he studied composition at the Brno Conservatory with Jaroslav Kvapil and musicology at the Masaryk University in Brno. He then continued studies in studio tracks with Kvapil at the Janáček Academy of Music and Performing Arts, which he eventually completed in 1970.

Gregor settled in Nový Jičín and worked as a composer. He married and had one son, Vit Gregor. He served as secretary of the creative branch of the Union of Czechoslovak Composers. Beginning in October 1959, he moved to Ostrava to work as head of the music broadcast station for Ostrava Czech Radio. In 1968 the arrival of Warsaw Pact troops disrupted his work at the radio station, and in 1972 Gregor was banned from publishing. In 1976 he moved to Prague, where he continued working as a composer.

As a composer, Gregor was initially heavily influenced by 20th century classical music, especially that of Igor Stravinsky, and by jazz. During the 1950s, with their requirements of Socialist realism, he produced songs for the Socialist Youth Movement, and expressed politically correct themes in his symphonic works. In later years, he endorsed the European modernist tradition.

He died in Prague in 2011.

== Selected works ==
=== Musical compositions ===
Gregor produced stage, orchestral and chamber music and also songs and incidental music.

==== Stage ====
- Lazebník sevillský (The Barber of Seville), Incidental Music for the play by Pierre Beaumarchais (1951)
- Krvavé křtiny aneb Drahomíra a její synové (Bloody Baptism, or Drahomír and Her Sons), Incidental Music for the play by Josef Kajetán Tyl (1956)
- Závrať (Vertigo), Ballet version of the Choreographic Symphony (Choreografické symfonie) (1964); libretto by Pavel Šmok
- Profesionální žena (A Professional Woman), Opera (1983); based on the novel by Vladimír Páral
- Horko, aneb jak je důležité umět (v tom) plavat (The Heat, or How Important Is To Know How To Swim), Ballet Comedy in 1 act (1978); libretto by Vladimír Vašut

==== Orchestral ====
- Čekání (Waiting), Symphonic Poem (1942)
- Symfonieta (1942)
- Jazzová symfonie (Jazz Symphony) (1949)
- Symphony No. 1 "O slávě našeho života" (1950)
- Radostná předehra (Joyful Overture; Ouvertura giocosa) (1951)
- Variace na dětské téma (Variations on a Children's Theme) (1952)
- "Kdyby všechny dívky světa" (If All the Girls of the World), Symphonic Picture (1953); original title: "Svazačka" (One of Us)
- Symphony No. 2 "Země a lidé" (Land and People) (1953)
- Výzva, Symphonic Overture (1953)
- Jednou z jara navečer (One Spring Evening), Suite for chamber orchestra (1954)
- Prosím o slovo, Symphonic Overture (1956)
- Tragická suita (Tragic Suite) for chamber orchestra (1957)
- Suita pro smyčcový orchestr (Suite for String Orchestra) (1959)
- Polyfonietta (1961)
- Děti Daidalovy (Daedalus' Children), Symphonic Poem (1961)
- Symphony No. 3 "Choreografická symfonie" (Choreographic Symphony) (1963)
- Kdyby všichni chlapi světa (If All the Guys in the World), Symphonic Overture (1963)
- Symfonie mého města (Symphony of My Town) (1971)
- Symfonietta (1976)
- Pražská noční symfonie (Prague Night Symphony) (1977)
- Já na vojnu se dal (I Joined the Army), Variations on an Old French Ballad (1978)
- Symfonické metamorfózy na bluesové téma (Symphonic Metamorphosis on a Blues Theme) (1986)
- ...odešla po špičkách (...She Left on Tiptoes), Portrait for string orchestra (1998)
- Evropa, hranice tisíciletí (Europe, the Boundaries of the Millennium), Symphony (1998–1999)
- Pražský chodec, dvě nokturna (2 Nocturnes) for string orchestra
- Zlověstná serenada (Sinister Serenade)

==== Concertante ====
- Nikdo není sám (Nobody Is Alone), Rhapsody for piano and orchestra (1955)
- Zlověstná serenáda for trumpet and chamber orchestra (1956)
- Concerto semplice for piano and orchestra (1958)
- Concerto for violin and orchestra (1965)
- Kompliment každodenní hudbě (Compliment to Everyday Music), Concerto for cello and orchestra (1974)
- Concerto da camera for clarinet and string orchestra (1977)
- Valčík (Waltz) for piano and orchestra (1978)
- Concerto giocondo for piano and orchestra (1979)

==== Chamber music ====
- Trio for flute, viola and bass clarinet (1959)
- String Quartet No. 1 (1965)
- Červen (June), Pastorale for clarinet and piano (1975)
- Hry (Games) for 2 accordions (1986)
- Příjemnosti (Amiabilities) for violin and piano (1987)
- Sonata No. 2 for violin and piano (1989)
- Dolce vita, 3 Pieces for viola and piano (1990)
- Důvěrnosti (Confidentiality) for violin and viola (1990)
- Tři generace (Three Generations) for string quartet (1991)
- Sonata No. 1 for violin and piano (1998)
- Sonata for cello and piano (1999)
- Náklonnosti (Affections) for viola and cello (2001)

==== Piano ====
- Olympia, Suite (1946)
- Experiment, Suite (1946)
- Sonata brevis (1946)
- Popelec (Ash Wednesday; Musical Ash Wednesday), Suite (1962)
- Sonata in tre tempi (Sonata in Three Tempos) (1966)
- Tre movimenti (1966)
- Vyhrávanky, Cycle for Children (1968)
- Introdukce a toccata (Introduction and Toccata) for 2 pianos (1976)
- Hudbánky for Young Pianists (1993)
- Sonata in quattro tempi (2002)
- Polehčující okolnosti (Mitigating Circumstances), Suite (2003)
- Expromptu (2005)

==== Choral ====
- Slunečné přístavy (1944)
- Český zpěv (Czech Song), Cantata (1951); words by Marie Pujmanová
- Ty a já for male chorus a cappella (1970); words by the composer
- Děti moře, Folk Cantata for mixed chorus a cappella (1975); words by Saint-Pol-Roux in translation by Karel Čapek

==== Vocal ====
- Dvě rozmarné balady for soprano and piano (1975)
- Písnička pracovních záloh

=== Literary works ===
- Miloslav Klega. Creation 1953-1965 (Ostrava Janáček Philharmonic 1966)
- Břetislav Bakala (Musical Perspectives 5, 1952, No.15)
- What my point. Self Portrait (Opus Musicum 1970)
- Article twenty to Janáček Philharmonic Orchestra (Opus Musicum 1974)
- Reflections on the melody (Opus Musicum 11, 1979, No. 10)
- Serious and fun (Gramorevue 13, 1977, No. 6, p 8)
- Reflections on the evaluation of new songs (Music Reviews XLI, 1988, No. 10, pp. 472–74)
- Emil Quail (Opus Musicum 24, 1992, No. 4-5).
- Search and find. The seventieth nedožitým M. Klegou (Alternative nova Opava, Vol. 2, 1996, No. 7)
- Audience opera (Prague, H & H 1997)
- Approximately 100 radio programs and expert comments
