= Marie Rafajová =

Czech writer (1896–1978)

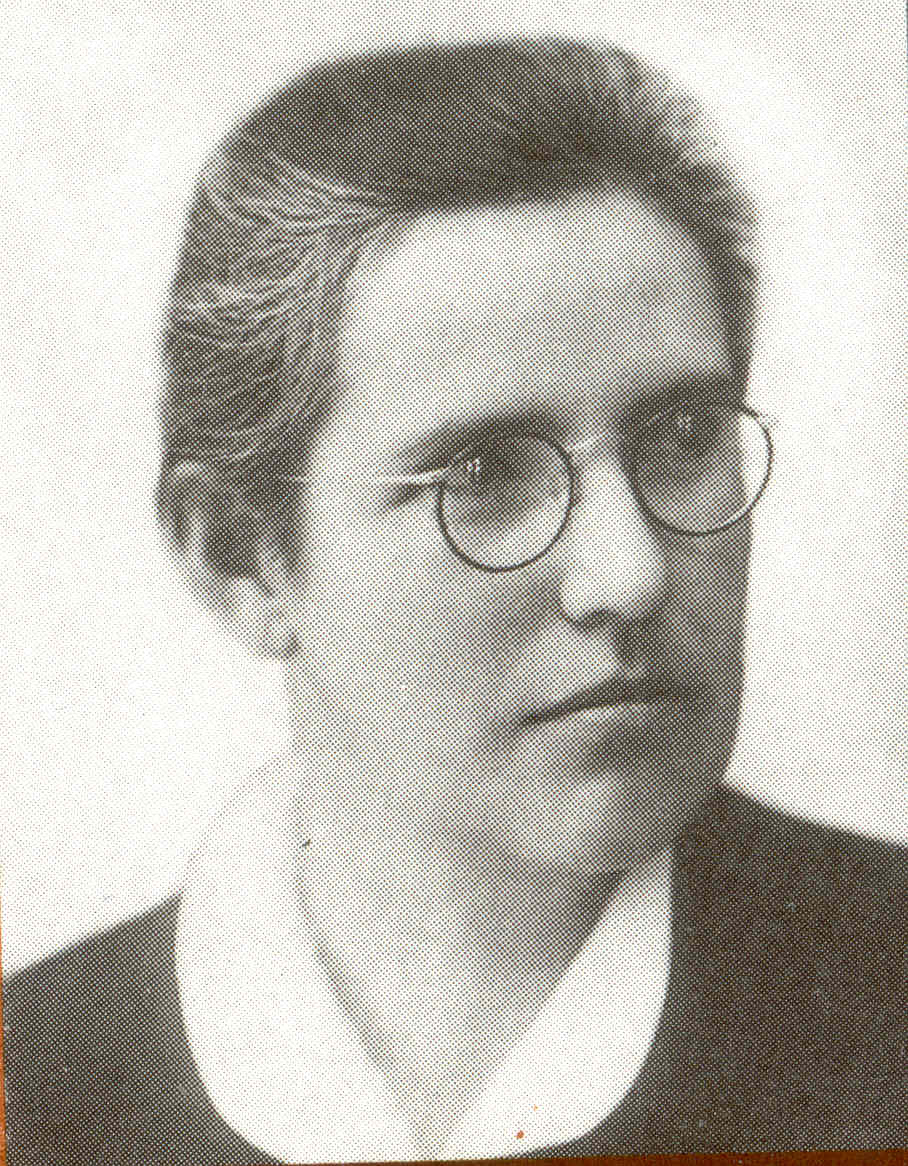
- Born: 29 November 1896; Královo Pole, Austria-Hungary
- Died: 1 July 1978 (aged 81); Bratislava, Czechoslovakia
- Resting place: Brno Central Cemetery
- Occupations: Poet, deaconess
- Writing career
- Language: Czech, Slovak
- Genres: Poetry, prose
- Notable awards: Righteous Among the Nations (1991)

Marie Karla Rafajová (29 November 1896 – 11 July 1978) was a Czech Protestant Deaconess, writer, journalist and translator. She lived most of her time in Slovakia and wrote in Slovak, in addition to her native Czech language. In 1991 she was listed among the Righteous Among the Nations in memoriam by Yad Vashem.

== Biography ==
Rafajová was born on 29 November 1896 is the town of Královo Pole, which has been a part of the city of Brno since 1919. She originally intended to study medicine, but was unable to do so due to the outbreak of the World War I. Following the war Rafajová moved to Prague to study Social Work. In Prague, she became acquainted with the work of Kristína Royová, a Slovak Lutheran Deaconess and writer, leader of a religious community Vieroslava in Stará Turá and the two started to exchange letters. Rafajová visited the community in 1925 and later accepted Royová's invitation to join the community on a permanent basis. When Royová died in 1936, Rafajová took her place in charge of the community.

In Stará Turá, Rafajová was active in caring for the poor and wrote prose and poetry, following the example of Royová. Her poems published in books Úzkou cestou, Za stany, Údolím pokory, Zpod věčných očí, Kam reflected her religiosity as well as experience growing up in Moravia. She also published verses in Slovak using the Slovak version of her name Mária. The best known example of her Slovak poetry is the book V zajatí slova dedicated to her close collaborator and fellow deaconess Markéta Pálová. She also translated from English, German and Swedish as well as from Czech to Slovak and from Slovak to Czech.

During the Slovak National Uprising, Rafajová and her community aided injured partisants and hid ten Jewish children from the Gestapo. Following the War, the Communisty regime disbanded the community. Until 1964 Rafajová lived with her friend Markéta Pálová in a hamlet near Stará Turá and later moved in with her sister Karla Soudková who lived in Bratislava. She died in Bratislava on 11 July 1978. She was buried in her family crypt located at the Brno Central Cemetery.
