= Tomáš Eduard Šilinger =

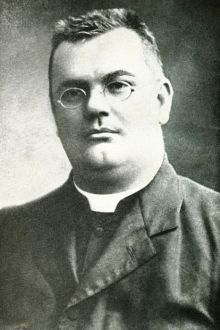
- Born: 16 December 1866; Tučín, Moravia, Austrian Empire
- Died: 17 June 1913 (aged 46); Luhačovice, Moravia, Austria-Hungary
- Occupations: Politician and journalist

Tomáš Eduard Šilinger (16 December 1866 – 17 June 1913) was a Czech politician and journalist. He was a member of the Augustinian Order of Brno. He was chief editor of the Czech Catholic newspaper Hlas in 1896.

== Life and work ==
Šilinger was born on 16 December 1866 in Tučín near Přerov in Moravia, Austrian Empire. After graduating, he joined St Thomas's Abbey, an Augustinian monastery located in old Brno. In the monastery he was renamed Tomáš (his birth name was Eduard). He was promoted to priest on 26 July 1891.

Šilinger contributed to the Catholic newspaper Hlas and became its chief editor in 1896. He changed it from a weekly to a daily newspaper. He was elected to the Imperial Council in Vienna in 1901. In 1906, he became national and later imperial representative in Vienna and also a representative of the Moravian Diet.

He died in Luhačovice on 17 June 1913, at the age of 46.

== Honours ==
Šilingerovo Square in Brno was named after him.
