= Jaroslav Kvapil (composer) =

Czech composer, conductor and pianist (1892–1958)

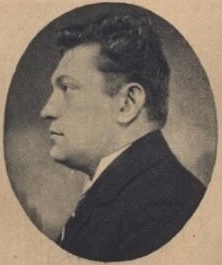
Jaroslav Kvapil

Jaroslav Kvapil (21 April 1892 – 18 February 1958) was a Czech composer, teacher, conductor and pianist.

== Life and career ==
Born in Fryšták, he studied with Josef Nešvera and worked as a chorister in Olomouc from 1902 to 1906. He then studied at the Brno School of Organists under Leoš Janáček, earning a diploma in 1909. He studied with Max Reger at the Leipzig Conservatory from 1911 through 1913.

Kvapil was an excellent accompanist, noted for his skill in sight reading. As the choirmaster and conductor of the Brno Beseda (1919–47) he gave the world première of Janáček's Glagolitic Mass, and the Czech premières of Johann Sebastian Bach’s St Matthew Passion (1923), Arthur Honegger’s Judith (1933) and Karol Szymanowski’s Stabat mater (1937). He received the Award of Merit in 1955. He taught at the School of Organists and at the Brno Conservatory, and he was appointed professor of composition at the academy in 1947. His students included Hana Janků, Miloslav Ištvan, Ctirad Kohoutek, Čestmír Gregor and Jiří Matys.

== Death ==
He died in Brno at the age of 65.

== Selected works ==
Orchestra

- Dnes a zítra (Today and Tomorrow), Symphonic Overture
- Notturno (1911)
- Symphony No.2
- Symphony No.4
- Svítání (Dawn), Symphonic Poem
- Thema con variazioni e fuga
- Z těžkých dob (From Hard Times), Symphonic Variations

Concertante

- Concerto for oboe and orchestra
- Concerto for piano and orchestra
- Concerto No.1 for violin and orchestra (1927–1928)
- Concerto No.2 for violin and orchestra (1952)
- Suita (Suite) for viola and chamber orchestra (1955)

Chamber music

- Clarinet Quintet (1914)
- Dvě skladby (2 Pieces) for violin and piano (1946)
- Quartet for flute, violin, viola and cello (1948)
- String Quartet No.4 (1935)
- Duo for violin and viola (1949)
- String Quartet No.5 (1949)
- Sonata in D major for violin and piano (1950)
- Sonata in D♭ major for violin and piano
- Sonata for violin and organ
- Variace na vlastní thema (Variations on an Original Theme) for trumpet and piano (1929)

Organ

- Fantasie in E minor

Piano

- Legenda (1912)
- Menuetto (1912)
- Intermezzo (1912)
- Humoreska (1912)
- Lento melancolico – Allegro risoluto
- Sonata (1910)
- Sonatina (1950)
- Údolím stesku a žalu, 9 Pieces (1936)
- Vánoce (Christmas) (1924)
- Variace na vlastní thema (Variations on an Original Theme) (1914)
- V říši snů (In the Realm of Dreams) (1933)

Vocal

- Pět písní na slova Antonína Sovy (5 Songs on the Words of Antonín Sova) (1918)

Choral

- Dukelská dumka, Song for unison chorus
