= Václav Kosmák =

Czech novelist, humorist and satirist

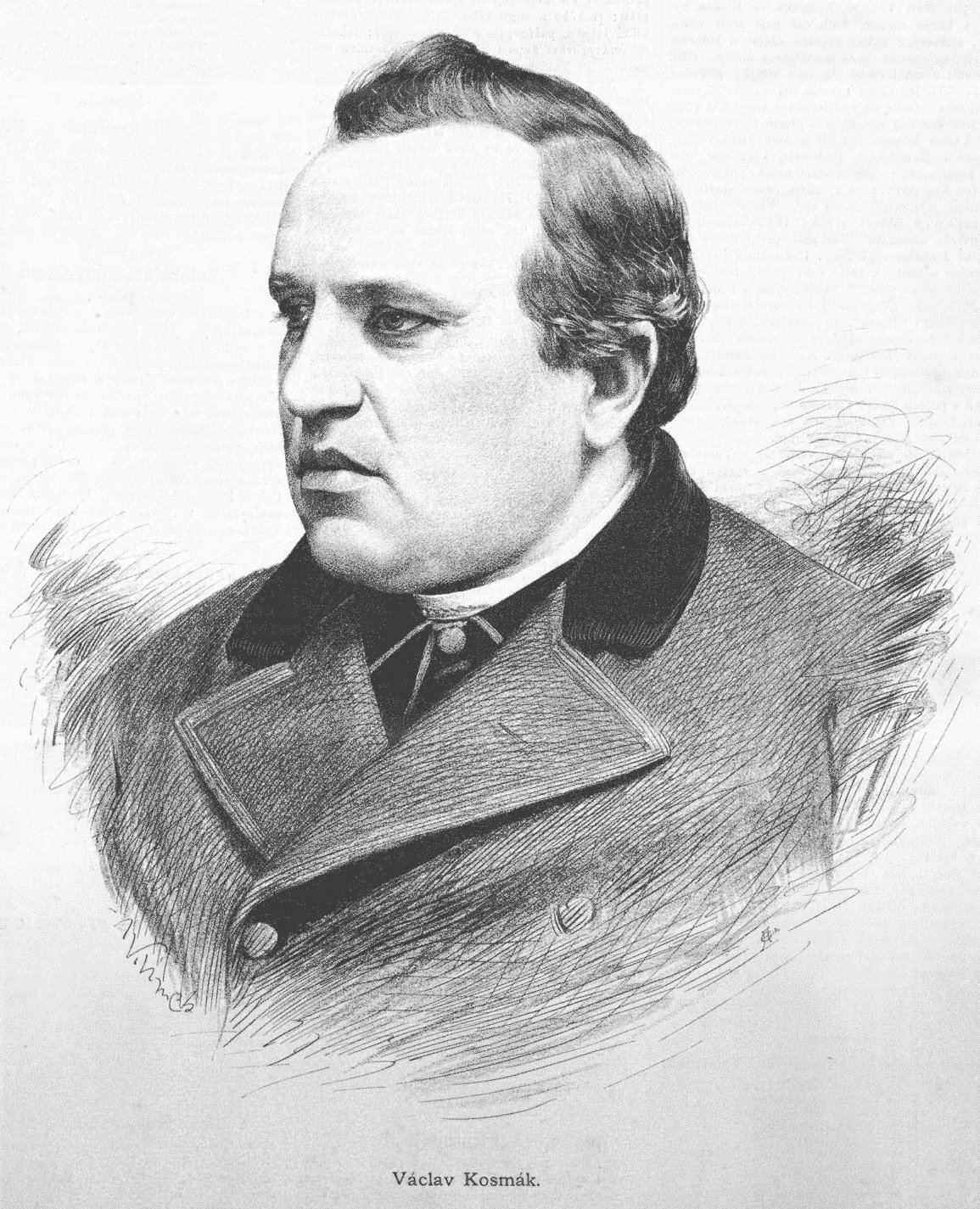
Kosmák's portrait by Jan Vilímek

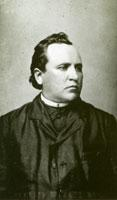
Václav Kosmák

Václav Kosmák (5 September 1843, Martínkov – 15 March 1898, Prosiměřice) was a Czech novelist, humorist and satirist.

== Biography ==
Kosmák was a priest as well as a writer. Notable for his realism and humor, Kosmák's short stories sketch the provincial life of Moravia. His collected works were published in 1883–1884; a second, more complete edition was published after his death. Notable of his works include Kukátko z kukátek, Jak Martin Chlubil bloudil a na pravou cestu opět se vrátil and Pokoj lidem dobre vůle (which could be translated into English as Keyhole of Keyholes, How Martin Chlubil Wandered but Returned to the Right Path Again, and Peace for the People) The Roman Catholic church where he was a priest, in Martínkov, outside of Prague, bears a monument in remembrance of his contribution to church, community, and the public.

In the 20th century, his writings were required reading in many Czech schools.
