= Hana Janků =

Czech operatic soprano

- Born: 25 October 1940; Brno, Protectorate of Bohemia and Moravia
- Died: 28 April 1995 (aged 54) Vienna, Austria
- Genres: Opera
- Occupation: Singer
- Instrument: soprano

Hana Janků (25 October 1940 – 28 April 1995) was a Czech operatic soprano.

== Life and career ==
Born in Brno, Janků studied with Jaroslav Kvapil in her home city before making her professional opera début at the Brno Opera in Vítězslav Novák's Lucerna. She became a principal singer at the Opéra national du Rhin and the Deutsche Oper am Rhein. She made her La Scala début in 1967 and at the Deutsche Oper Berlin in 1970. She made her debut at the Royal Opera, London in 1973 as Tosca. She also worked as a guest artist with several other major opera houses, including the Vienna State Opera, the Hamburg State Opera, the San Francisco Opera and the Teatro Colón. She was particularly admired for her portrayal of the title role in Giacomo Puccini's Turandot and Tosca. She died in Vienna on 28 April 1995.
