= František Vymazal =

Czech linguist and translator (1841–1917)

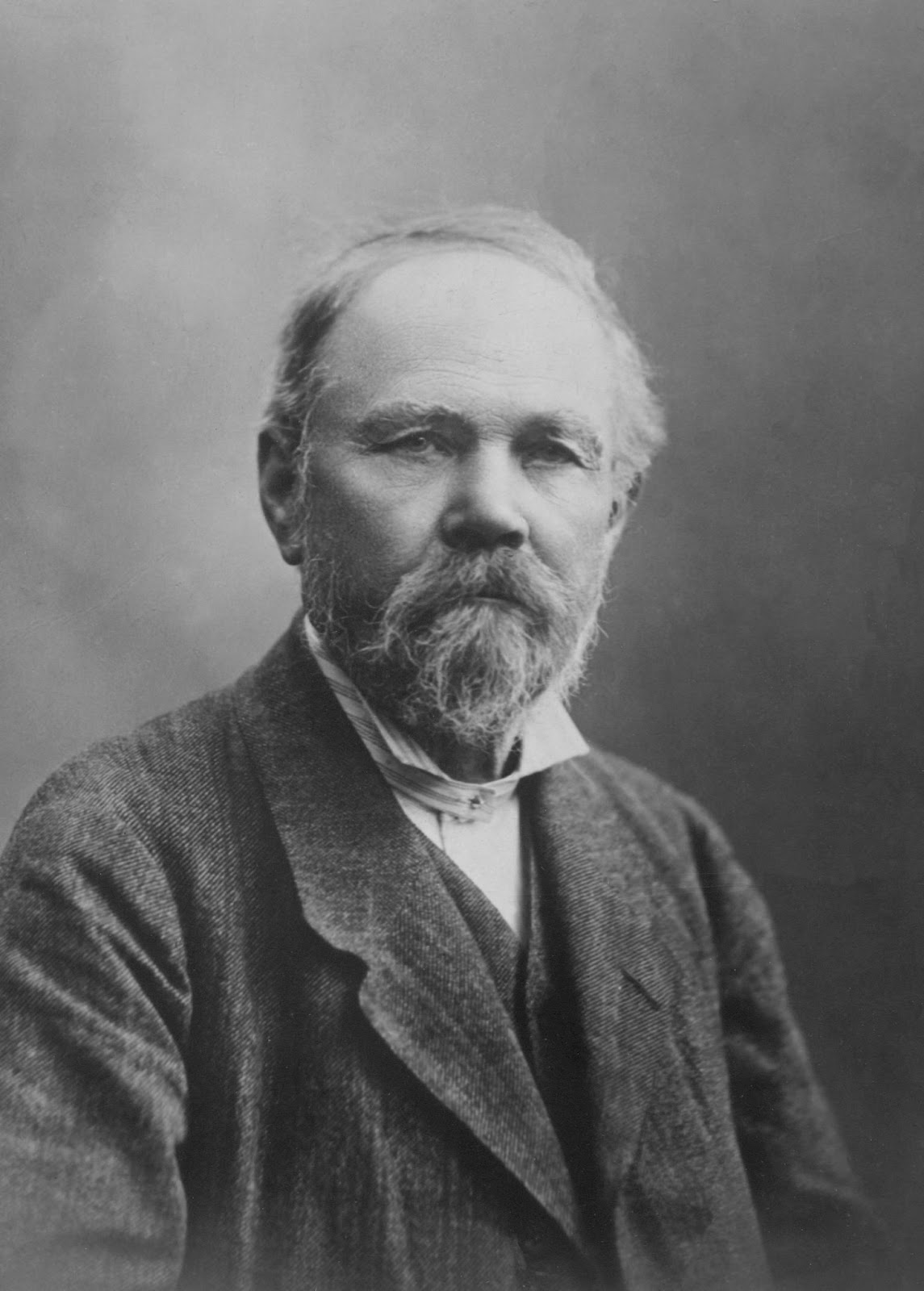

František Vymazal (6 November 1841 – 6 April 1917) was a Czech polyglot and language textbook writer.

== Life and work ==
Vymazal was born on 6 November 1841 in Topolany. he was born in a poor family and worked as a corrector in printing house. His life was quite eccentric and solitary. Later in life he lost his sight because of the hard work in the printing house, and he died in a traffic accident.

He wrote a widely used series of easy-to-learn language textbooks entitled Snadno a rychle (Czech for 'quick and easy'). In his textbooks he taught the basics of more than thirty languages, including Turkish, Hebrew and Lithuanian, and Bohemian Romani.

Vymazal's learning method was based on simple presumptions: short, simple sentences are better to memorize than single words and complex grammatical rules. All grammar and vocabulary is explained in short sentences taken from ordinary life. Students should memorize these sentences by heart.

Vymazal's books were widely used in prewar Austria, some of them were translated into German. He also wrote a cycle of short, mostly satirical, aphorisms in the style of Voltaire, entitled Zrnka ('Grains'), which are still quoted sometimes.

Vymazal died on 6 April 1917 in Brno.
