= List of people from Brno =

People known for their achievements in different fields have come from the city of Brno, Czech Republic or lived there. They include scientist Gregor Mendel, who made epochal pea plant experiments, composer Leoš Janáček, and writer Milan Kundera. Numerous politicians and athletes were also born or lived in the city.

== Science and academia ==
- Karel Absolon (1877—1960), archaeologist, geographer, paleontologist, and speleologist, custodian of the Moravian Museum, lived in Brno and is buried in the Brno Central Cemetery.
- Leopold Adametz (1861—1941), Austrian zoologist, born in Brno.
- Eugen Böhm von Bawerk (1851—1914), Austrian economist and three-times Minister of Finance, born in Brno.
- Emanuel von Friedrichsthal (1809—1842), Austrian botanist and traveller, born in Brno.
- Kurt Gödel (1906—1978), Austrian logician, mathematician and analytic philosopher, born and grew up at Pekarska 5.
- Johann Gottlieb (1815—1875), Austrian chemist, born in Brno.
- František Graus (1921—1989), Czech-German historian, born in Brno.
- Karl Grobben (1854—1945), Austrian biologist, born in Brno and lived at Lidicka 4/5.
- Ferdinand Ritter von Hebra (1816—1880), Austrian dermatologist, born in Brno.
- Ernst Mach (1838—1916), Austrian physicist and philosopher, born in Brno-Chrlice and lived at Chrlické nam. 1 until the age of 14.
- Gregor Mendel (1822—1884), founder of genetics and Abbot of St Thomas's Abbey, who performed his historic experiments with peas in the monastery gardens. Brno's Mendel Square (Czech: Mendlovo namesti) is named after him.
- Zdeněk Neubauer (1942—2016), philosopher and biologist.
- Peter Newmark (1916-2011), translation scholar.
- George Placzek (1905—1955), physicist (Manhattan Project).
- Emil Redlich (1866—1930), Austrian neurologist, born in Brno.
- Heinrich Wilhelm Schott (1794—1865), Austrian botanist, born in Brno.
- Vinoš Sofka (1929—2016), museologist, born in Brno and lived at Havlíčkova 39.
- Pavel Tichý (1936—1994), logician and philosopher, born in Brno.
- Heinrich Wawra von Fernsee (1831—1887), botanist and doctor, born and educated in Brno, and lived at Křenová 36 and Pekařská 53.
- Rudolf Wlassak (1865—1930), Austrian neurologist, born in Brno.
- Viktor Kaplan (1876—1934), Austrian engineer, lived at Úvoz 52 from 1903 to 1931. Kaplan invented the Kaplan turbine in 1909—1912 in laboratories at the Storck factory in Brno.

== Government and politics ==
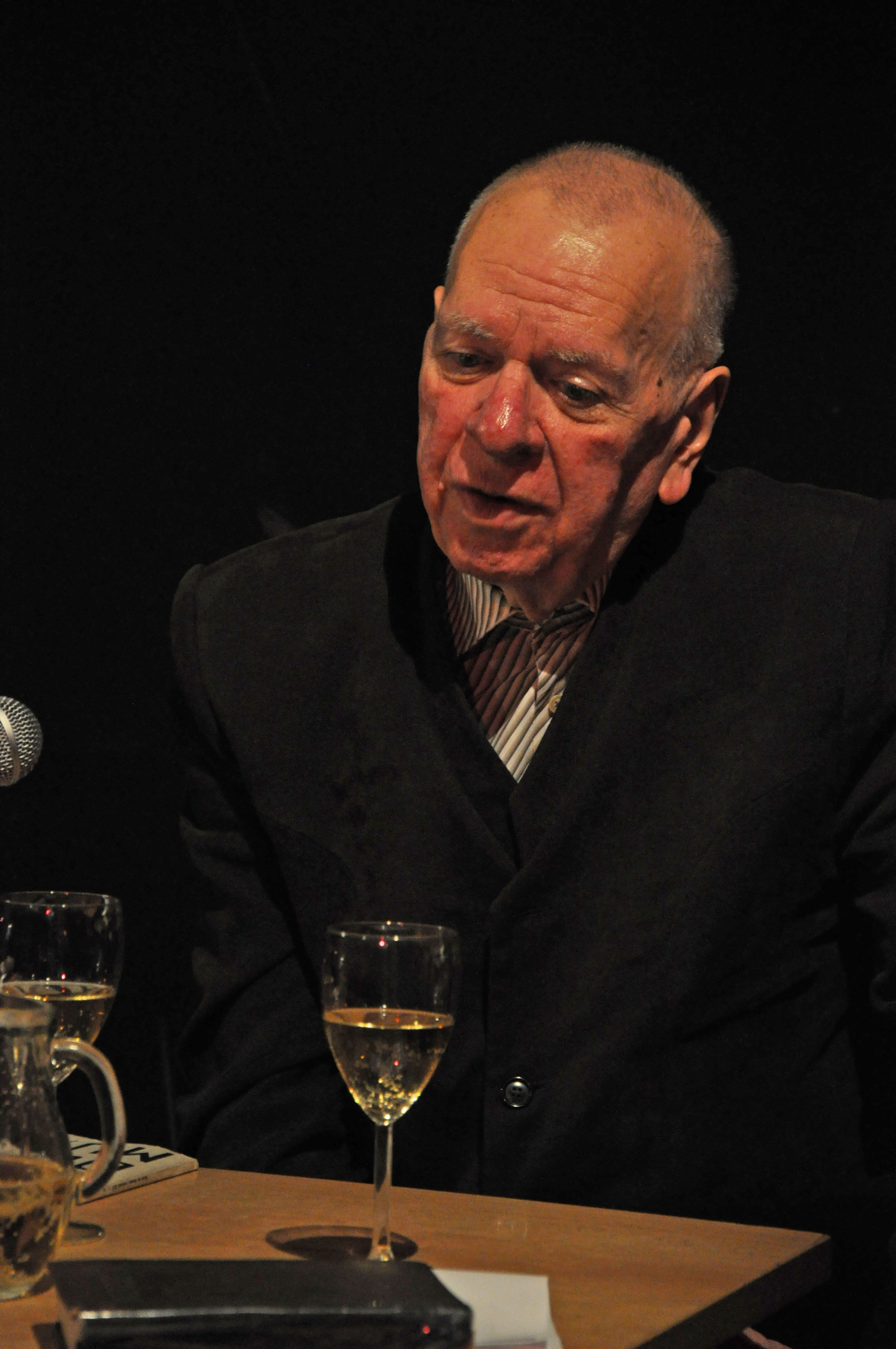
Milan Uhde

- Zuzana Brzobohatá (born 1962), Social Democrat politician, MP (2008—2009) and MEP (2009—2014), born in Brno and educated at the Brno University of Technology.
- Michal Hašek (born 1976), Social Democrat politician, MP (2002—2014) and Governor of South Moravia (2008—2016), born in Brno and educated at the Faculty of Law at Masaryk University.
- Tomáš Julínek (born 1956), doctor, Minister of Health (2007—2009), born in Brno and graduated from Masaryk University in 1982.
- Ondřej Liška (born 1977), Green Party politician, MP (2006—2010) and Minister of Education (2007—2009), born in Brno and educated at Masaryk University.
- Baron Franz von Pillersdorf (1786—1862), Austrian statesman, born in Brno.
- Ferdinand Troyer (1780—1851), Austrian nobleman and amateur clarinetist, born in Brno.
- Milan Uhde (born 1936), playwright, Charter 77 signatory and Civic Democrat politician, Speaker of the Chamber of Deputies of the Czech Republic (1993—1996).

== Writers ==
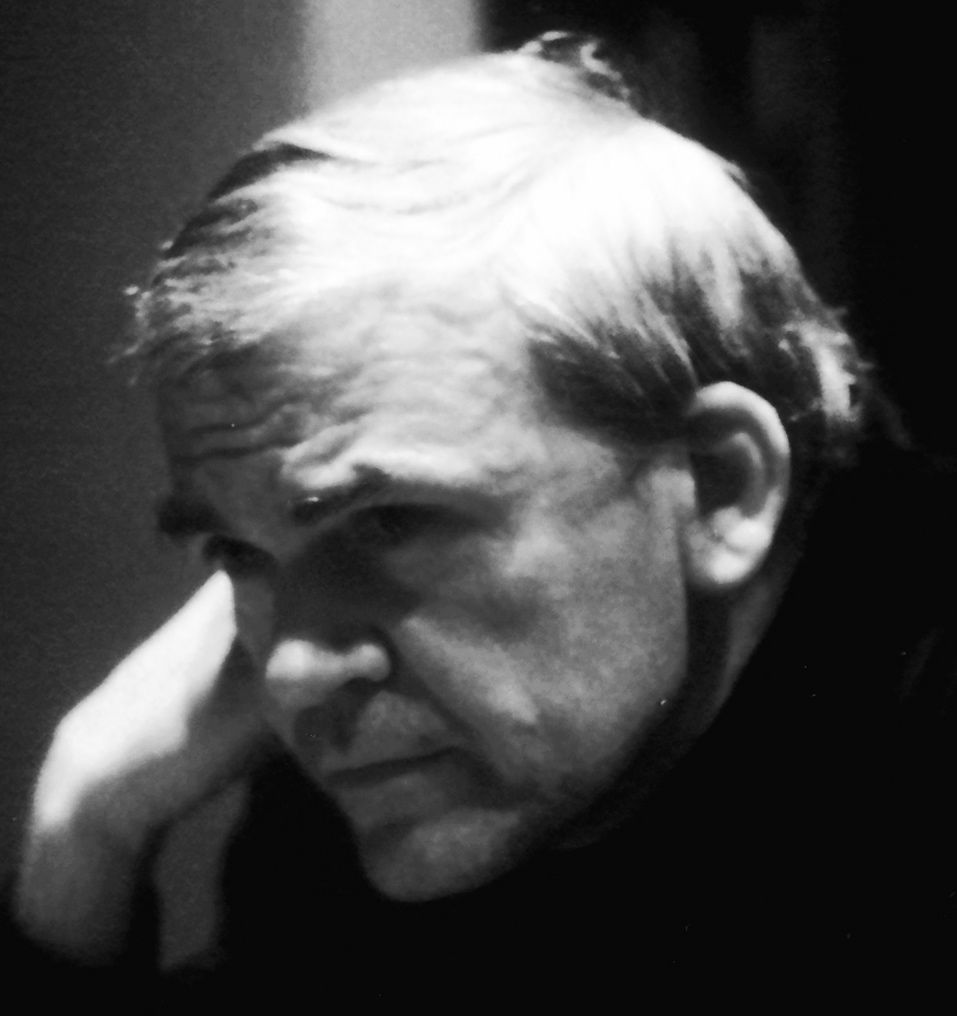
Milan Kundera

- Fritz Grünbaum (1880—1941), Austrian Jewish cabaret artist and composer, born and grew up in Brno.
- František Halas (1901—1949), poet, essayist, and translator, born and raised in Brno-Husovice.
- Bohumil Hrabal (1914—1997), author (Closely Watched Trains, I Served the King of England), born at Balbínova 47, Brno-Židenice.
- Hellmuth Karasek (1934–2015), German poet, novelist, journalist, author and literary critic, born in Brno.
- Milan Kundera (born 1929), Czech-French author (The Unbearable Lightness of Being, The Joke), born at Purkyňova 6, Brno-Královo Pole, educated at Gymnázium třída Kapitána Jaroše.
- Helene Migerka (1867—1928), Austrian poet and novelist, born in Brno.
- David Ernst Oppenheim (1881—1943), Austrian educator and psychologist, born in Brno.
- Fredy Perlman (1934—1985), American author and academic, born in Brno.
- Zdeněk Rotrekl (1920—2013), Catholic poet and literary historian, born in Brno, lived at Jana Uhra 18, studied at Masaryk University's Faculty of Arts, had his funeral at St. Thomas Church.
- Jan Trefulka (1929—2012), writer and literary critic, born in Brno—Kralovo Pole, died in Brno in 2012.
- Kateřina Tučková (born 1980), writer and playwright, born in Brno, educated at Gymnázium třída Kapitána Jaroše and Masaryk University's Faculty of Arts.
- Ernst Weiss (1882—1940), Austrian Jewish physician and author, born and attended gymnasium in Brno.

== Musicians and composers ==
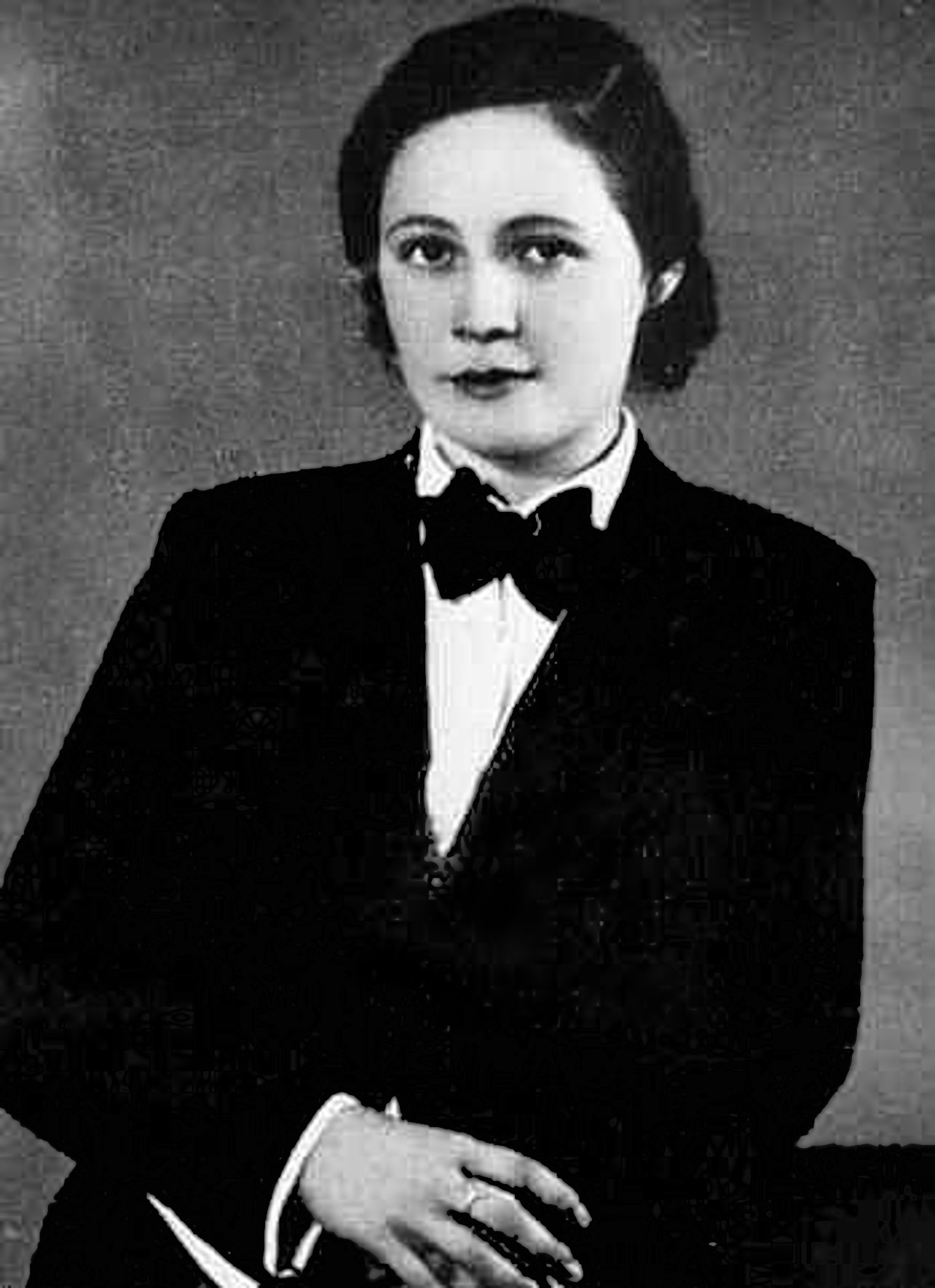
Vítězslava Kaprálová

- Igor Ardašev (born 1967), pianist, studied at the Brno Conservatory and the Janáček Academy of Performing Arts.
- Josef Berg (1927—1971), composer, born in Brno and studied at the Brno Conservatory (1946-50), Masaryk University, and the Janáček Academy of Performing Arts (1948-49).
- Gustav Brom (1921—1995), Slovak-Czech big band leader, arranger, clarinetist and composer, lived in Brno from 1933. Granted honorary citizenship of the City of Brno in memoriam in December 2021.
- Libuše Domanínská (1924—2021), classical soprano, closely associated with the Brno National Theatre, born in Brno and lived in the city again from 1939.
- Heinrich Wilhelm Ernst (1812—1865), violinist, violist, and composer, born in Brno.
- Pavel Haas (1899—1944), composer, born in Brno, studied at the Beseda music school and the Brno Conservatory (1919-21).
- Leoš Janáček (1854—1928), composer, moved to Brno in 1865 to study at St Thomas's Abbey, and was closely associated with the city thereafter. Founding director of the Brno Conservatory in 1919. Buried in Brno Central Cemetery. The Janáček Theatre (1965) is named after him.
- Maria Jeritza (1887—1982), opera singer, born Marie Jedličková in Brno.
- Vítězslava Kaprálová (1915—1940), composer, born in Brno, lived at Metodejova 6, Purkyňova 40, and Husitská 2, studied at the Brno Conservatory (1930-35).
- Tereza Kerndlová (born 1986), singer and Czech entrant in the Eurovision Song Contest 2008, born and grew up in Brno.
- Jiří Kollert (born 1974), pianist, born in Brno.
- Erich Wolfgang Korngold (1897—1957), Austrian-American composer, Academy Award-winner (1939), born in Brno.
- Magdalena Kožená (born 1973), classical mezzo-soprano, born in Brno and studied at the Brno Conservatory (1987-91).
- Franz Xaver Neruda (1843—1915), Czech-Danish cellist and composer, born in Brno.
- Wilma Neruda (1839—1911), violinist, born in Brno.
- Jan Škrdlík (born 1964), cellist, studied at the Janáček Academy of Performing Arts (1987-91) and later taught at the Brno Conservatory (1997-2009).

== Visual arts ==
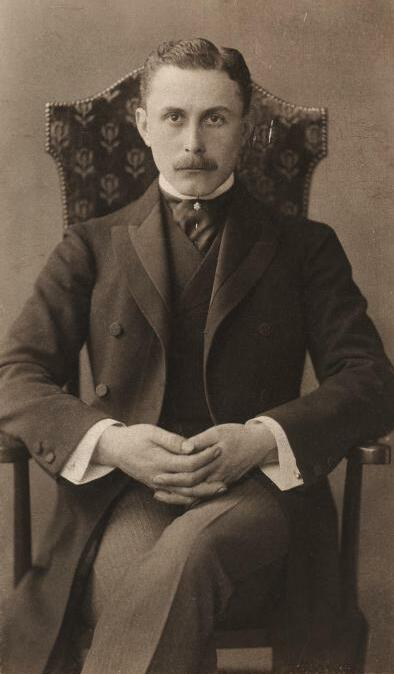
Adolf Loos

- Dina Babbitt (1923—2009), Holocaust survivor and artist, born in Brno.
- Franta Belsky (1921—2000), Czech-British WWII veteran and sculptor, born in Brno.
- Helena Bochořáková-Dittrichová (1894—1980), graphic artist, moved to Brno aged 17, lived at Antonínská 4 for the rest of her life.
- Tamara Divíšková (born 1934), costume designer and ceramist, born in Brno and lived at Slepá 33a.
- Mathilde Esch (1815—1904), Austrian genre painter, born in Brno.
- Bohuslav Fuchs (1895—1972), functionalist architect, lived in Brno from 1922, chief architect of the city from 1925.
- Jan Kotěra (1871—1923), architect, born on Lidicka street in Brno.
- Lubo Kristek (born 1943), sculptor, painter and performer, born in Brno, creator of the Kristek House (2015-2017).
- Adolf Loos (1870—1933), Austrian architect, born in Brno.
- Jakub Obrovský (1882—1949), artist, sculptor and writer, born at Výhon 19, Brno-Bystrc.
- Antonín Procházka (1882—1945), painter, lived and worked in Brno from 1924. The street where he lived is named after him.
- Alfred Roller (1864—1935), Austrian painter and designer, born in Brno.
- Anna Ticho (1894—1980), Israeli artist, born in Brno.
- Norbert Troller (1896—1984), architect and artist known for his portrayal of life in the Theresienstadt concentration camp, born and raised in Brno, attended Brno University of Technology (from 1919), had an architectural practice at Cejl 53 (1930-1942), lived at Uvoz 64 (1946-1948).

== Film and theatre ==
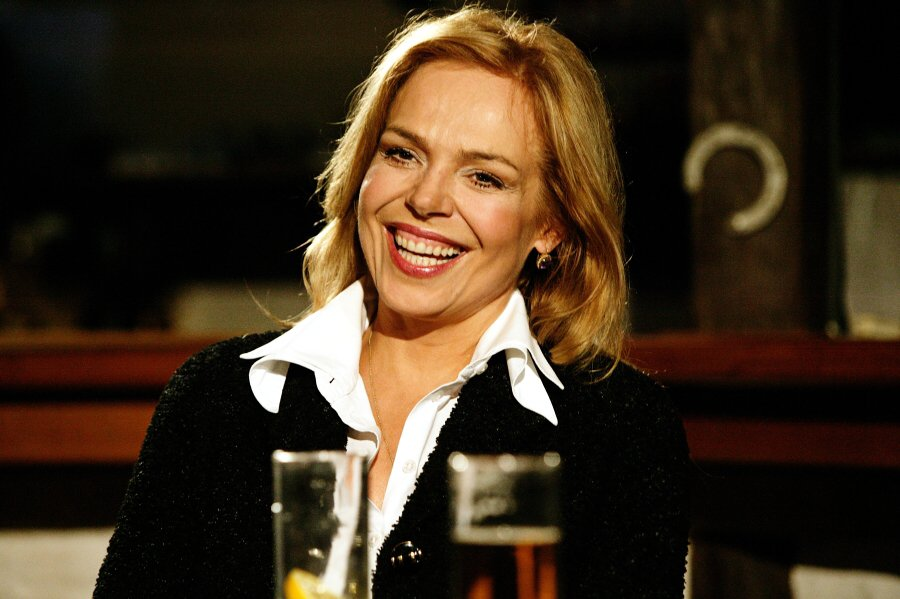
Dagmar Havlová

- Radúz Činčera (1923—1999), screenwriter and director
- Nina Divíšková (1936—2021), actress
- Vlasta Fialová (1928-1998), Czech film and stage actress
- Yana Gupta (born 1979), actress in Bollywood and Indian regional films
- Hugo Haas (1901—1968), director and actor
- Dagmar Havlová (born 1953), actress
- Dušan David Pařízek (born 1971), theatre director
- Libuše Šafránková (1953—2021), actress
- Markéta Štroblová (born 1988), known as Little Caprice, pornographic film actress, born in Brno-Vinohrady.

== Sport ==
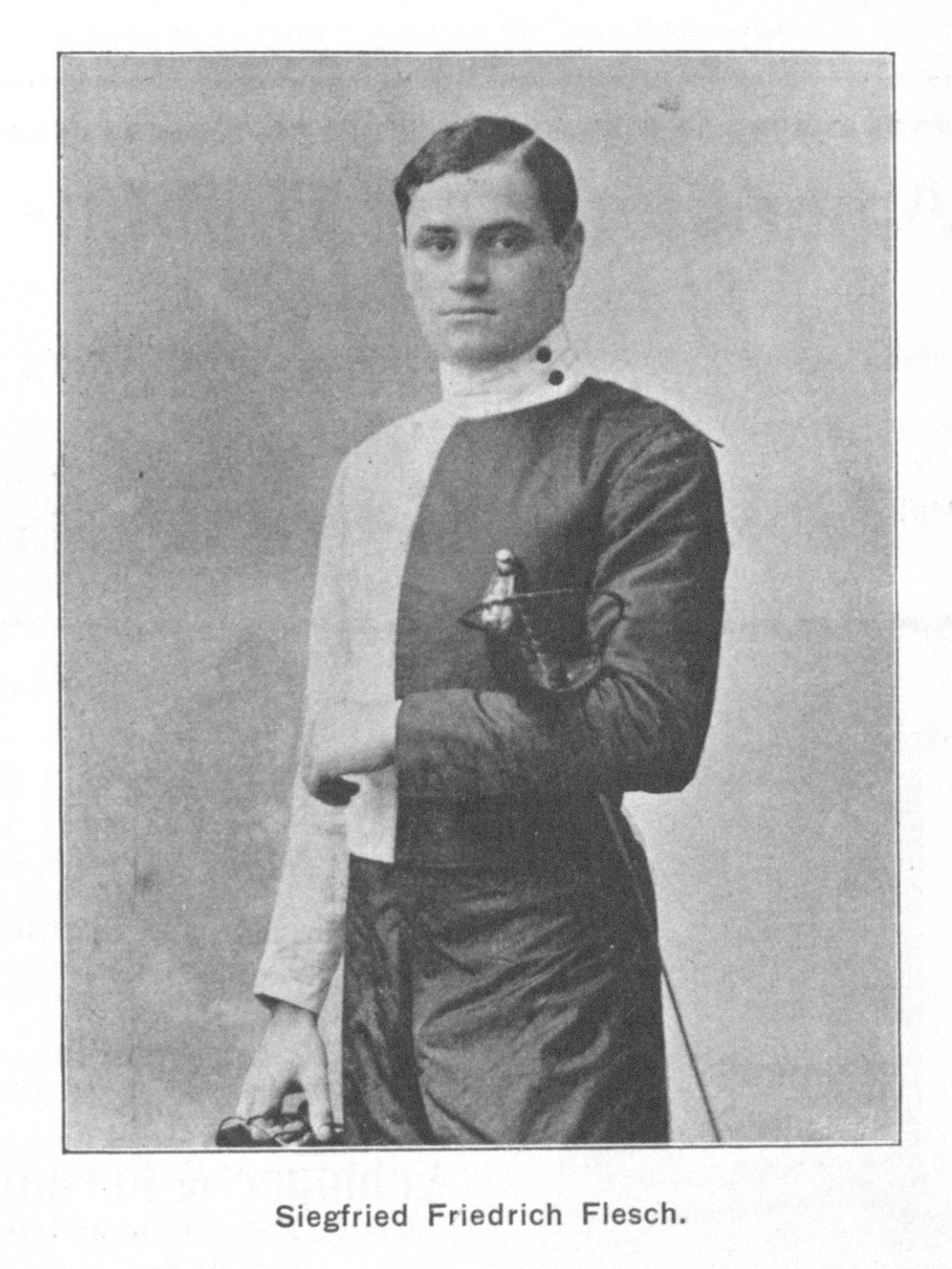
Siegfried Flesch

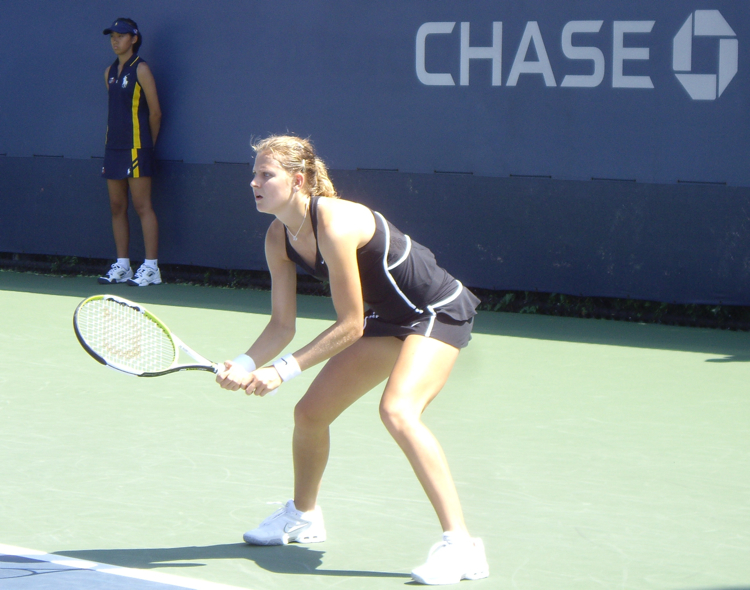
Lucie Šafářová at the US Open in 2007

- Karel Abrahám (born 1990), motorcycle racer
- Zdeněk Blatný (born 1981), hockey player
- Jaroslav Borák (born 1989), football player
- Julius Brach (1881–1938), chess master
- Vlastimil Bubník (1931–2015), ice hockey player and footballer
- Lukáš Dostál (born 2000), hockey player
- Richard Farda (born 1945), hockey player
- Siegfried Flesch (1872–1939), Olympic medalist saber fencer
- Jana Galíková (born 1963), orienteerer
- Ondřej Hotárek (born 1984), skater
- Petr Hubáček (born 1979), hockey player
- Jaroslav Jiřík (1939–2011), hockey player
- Luboš Kalouda (born 1987), football player
- Renata Kolbovic (born 1976), tennis player
- Michal Kolomazník (born 1976), football player
- David Kostelecký (born 1975), shooter
- Ada Kuchařová (born 1958), orienteerer
- Tomáš Mica (born 1983), football player
- Jana Novotná (1968–2017), tennis player
- Adam Ondra (born 1993), rock climber
- Zdenka Podkapová (born 1977), former gymnast and model
- Antonín Procházka (born 1942), volleyball player
- Jiří Procházka (born 1992), UFC Fighter
- Lucie Šafářová (born 1987), tennis player
- Nella Simaová (born 1988), figure skater
- Zdeněk Svoboda (born 1972), football player
- Tomáš Vincour (born 1990), NHL hockey player for the Dallas Stars
- Josef Volf (1939–2025), cyclist
- René Wagner (born 1972), football player
- Pavel Zacha (born 1997), hockey player
- Jakub Zbořil (born 1997), NHL hockey prospect for the Boston Bruins
- Emil Zinner (1909–1942), chess master

== Religious figures ==
- Zvi Dershowitz (1928—2023), conservative rabbi of Sinai Temple, Los Angeles, California
- Mathias Franz Graf von Chorinsky Freiherr von Ledske (1720—1786), first Bishop of the Roman Catholic Diocese of Brno in 1777
- Michael Czerny (born 1946) - Canadian cardinal of the Catholic Church of Czechoslovak origin, born in Brno

== Others ==
- Freddie Hornik (1944—2009), Brno-born British fashion entrepreneur
- Barbara Lauwers (1914—2009), World War II counter-intelligence officer and recipient of the US Bronze Star Medal, born Božena Hauserová in Brno and studied at Masaryk University.
- Bedřich Pokorný (1904—1968), Czechoslovak police commander and secret service officer.
