= Andrea Kalivodová =

Czech opera singer (born 1977)

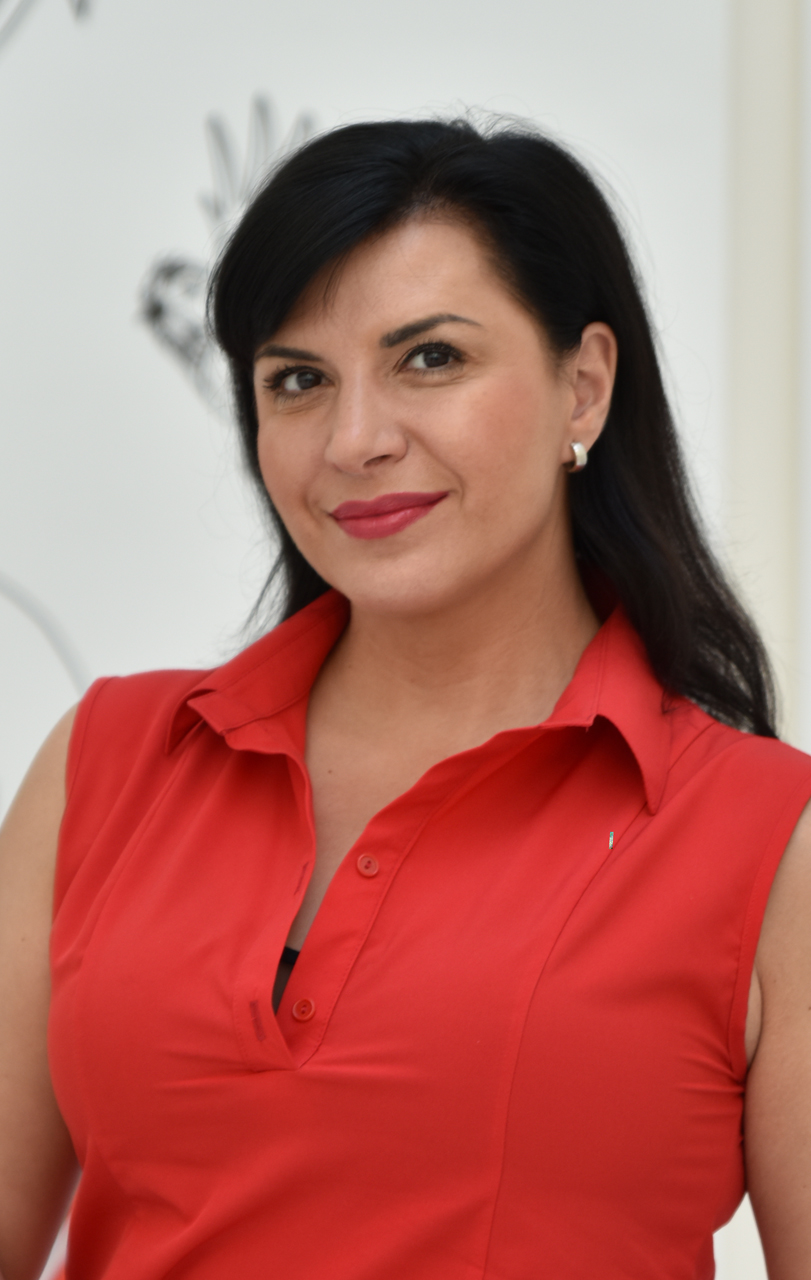
- Kalivodová in 2022
- Born: 24 November 1977 (age 47); Kroměříž, Czechoslovakia
- Occupation: Operatic mezzo-soprano
- Organizations: Prague State Opera
- Website: www.kalivodova.cz

Andrea Kalivodová (born 24 November 1977) is a Czech opera singer. A mezzo-soprano, Kalivodová has been performing as a soloist with the Prague State Opera since 2003.

== Life and career ==
Born in Kroměříž in 1977, Kalivodová spent her childhood in Brno, attending the Brno Conservatory. In 1998 she won the National Competition of Czech Conservatories in Pardubice, and went on to study at the Music and Dance Faculty of the Academy of Performing Arts in Prague (HAMU). After graduating from HAMU she went on to study for one year at the University of Music and Performing Arts Vienna (MDW). During this period she won a number of international singing competitions, including first prize from the Emmy Destinn Foundation in the Anglo-Czechoslovak Trust's International Singing Competition in 2001, as a result of which she was invited to perform with other young singers in Covent Garden, London. She also reached the semi-finals of the Belvedere International Singing Competition in Vienna, and won in Category A of the International Singing Competition in České Budějovice in 2000.

Kalivodová first worked with the Prague State Opera in 2001, as part of the Pounding on the Iron Curtain project, a production of two operas by Vladimir Wimmer. In 2002 she made her first appearance at the National Moravian-Silesian Theatre in Ostrava, playing Kontshakovna in the opera Prince Igor. Later the same year she performed the role of Amastrys in Opera Praha's production of Xerxes, which toured Germany, Switzerland, France and Luxembourg. In December 2003 she performed with Leo Nucci of the New York Metropolitan Opera at the Žofín Palace in Prague, followed by an appearance at the Konzerthaus in Vienna in June 2004 to mark the accession of the Czech Republic to the European Union. Kalivodová has since then performed around the world, including the Centre for Fine Arts in Brussels, and the State Kremlin Palace in Moscow, as well as concerts in Japan and the United States, and joined the European Stars' Tour in 2005, celebrating the 60th anniversary of the end of the Second World War.

Kalivodová has been performing with the Prague State Opera since 2002, and as a soloist since 2003, with a home venue at the Prague National Theater. Among her performances with the Prague State Opera were her role, in April 2008, as Carmen in Georges Bizet's opera of the same name at the O2 Arena in Prague, a production which was also staged in Budapest, Mannheim, and Freiburg, among other cities across Europe and in the Czech Republic. In July 2009 she performed the role of the Witch in Rusalka on a revolving stage in Český Krumlov, in a production directed by Josef Průdka and conducted by John Keenan of the New York Met. During her career she has worked with conductors including Leoš Svárovský, Vladimír Válek, Petr Vronský, Fabio Luisi, John Keenan, Heiko Mathias Förster, and Kaspar Zehnder.

Kalivodová also writes her own material, and is involved in a project entitled Alma Mahler, Her Life and Songs, featuring the autobiography of Alma Mahler put to music. She has also performed in the operetta Polish Blood, by Oskar Nedbal, at Karlín Musical Theater in Prague. In late 2011, Kalivodová's first album, The Paths of Love was released, a live performance from the Music of Thousands Mahler Jihlava Festival, where she performed a collection of Czech songs, mostly connected to folklore, including Antonín Dvořák's "Songs My Mother Taught Me", Otakar Ostrčil's "The Orphan", and compositions by Petr Eben, Jan Kunc, Bohuslav Martinu and Leos Janacek.

Kalivodová also does charity work, principally for IKEMU, which focuses on people with pulmonary hypertension, and the Cerebrum Association, supporting patients with brain injuries.
