= Ludvík Kundera (musicologist) =

Czech musicologist (1891–1971)

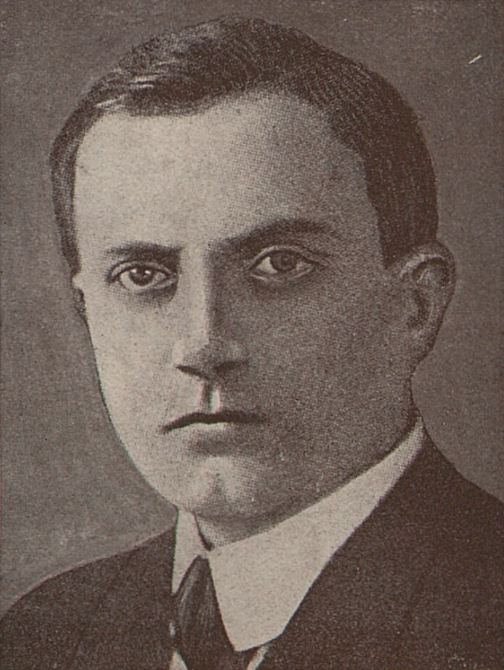
- Born: 17 August 1891
- Died: 12 May 1971 (aged 79)

Ludvík Kundera (17 August 1891 – 12 May 1971) was a Czechoslovak musicologist, pianist and academic administrator.

== Biography ==
Kundera was born in Brno, Královo Pole as the youngest of seven siblings in a family which supported his passion for music from early childhood. He studied at German gymnasium and piano playing under Klotylda Schäfrová. Later he was taught by the czech composer Leoš Janáček. His first public performance took place in 1912, with compositions by Johann Sebastian Bach, Robert Schumann, Bedřich Smetana and Franz Liszt.

During World War I, he served in the Czechoslovak Legion. He enlisted on 14 July 1914 and was assigned to the 8th Infantry Regiment operating in Sibiu, Transylvania. He was captured by Russians in 1915 and on 1 August 1916 he joined the Czechoslovak Legion in Russia. During his stay in Russia, he became familiar with the cultural life of the country and occasionally he organized and performed on public concertos. In June 1920, he travelled from Vladivostok to Trieste and later back to the Czechoslovakia.

In 1925, he attended the masterclasses of Alfred Cortot at the École Normale de Musique in Paris. He also continued his studies in Vienna and Prague and earned a doctorate in musicology from Brno University in 1925. He taught at Brno Conservatory from 1922 to 1941 (until his removal by the Nazi authorities occupying Czechoslovakia) and was the first rector at the Brno Academy JAMU from 1948 to 1961. From 1945 to 1946 he was the director of the Brno Conservatory. From 1946 to 1948 he was head of the music department of the Education Faculty of the Charles University in Prague. As a pianist he concertized widely both at home and abroad, performing both as a soloist and in chamber music groups and often promoting the music of Czech composers. As a musicologist he is perhaps best known for his analyses of the works of Leoš Janáček. He was the father of the writer Milan Kundera and uncle of the writer Ludvík Kundera.

He died in Brno on 12 May 1971. His funeral was accompanied by the String Quartet No. 2 "Intimate Letters" by Leoš Janáček.

== Publications ==
- Richarda Wagnera “Tristan und Isolde”, HR, vi (1912–13), 233–41
- O muzïke chekhoslovatskego naroda [Music of the Czechoslovak nation] (Yekaterinburg, 1919)
- Hudba v Sovětském Rusku [Music in Soviet Russia], Hudební rozhledy, i (1924–25), 24–6
- Janáčkův klavírní sloh [Janáček's piano style], Hudební rozhledy, i (1924–25), 42–5
- O estetice umělěcké a zvláště hudební reprodukce [The aesthetics of artistic, and in particular, musical reproduction] (diss., U. of Brno, 1925)
- Janáčkova “Věc Makropulos”, HRo, iii (1926–27), 19–21, 37–41
- Janáčeks Stil, Der Auftakt, vii (1927), 279–83
- Janáčkova Glagolská mše, Tempo [Prague], vii (1927–28), 186–93
- Hudba a ruská legie [Music and the Russian Legion], Tempo [Prague], viii (1928–29), 16–21
- Václav Kaprál; Vilém Petrželka; Jaroslav Kvapil; Jan Kunc, Tempo [Prague], ix (1929–30), 318–24; x (1930–31), 47–55; xi (1932), 127–40, 176–9; xii (1932–33), 241–52
- Soudobá hudební Morava [Music in present-day Moravia], Československá vlastivěda, viii (Prague, 1935), 558–65
- Hudba a revoluce [Music and revolution], Dějiny světové hudby, ed. J. Branberger (Prague, 1939), 553–637
- Kvapil (Prague, 1944)
- Jak organizovati hudební výchovu v obnoveném státě [How to organize music education in the renewed state] (Brno, 1945)
- Janáček a Klub přátel umění [Janáček and the Club of the Friends of Art] (Olomouc, 1948)
- Janáčkova varhanická škola [Janáček's organ school] (Olomouc, 1948)
- Chopinovy vlivy ve Smetanově klavírní tvorbě [Chopin's influence on Smetana's piano works], Musikologie, ii (1949), 11–37
- Ludvík van Beethoven (Prague, 1952)
- Janáčkova tvorba klavírní [Janáček's piano works], Musikologie, iii (1955), 306–29
- K otázce interpretace Janáčkových děl [The interpretation of Janáček's works], Leoš Janáček a soudobá hudba: Brno 1958, 189–96; also in Sborník Janáčkovy akademie múzických umění, ii (1960), 5–18; Ger. trans. in Operní dílo Leoše Janáčka: Brno 1965, 141–4
- O sovětském a našem hudebním školství [Soviet and Czech music education], HRo, xi (1958), 179–82
- Beethovenovy klavírní sonáty, i (Prague, 1964)
- Václav Kaprál: kapitola z historie české meziválečné hudby [A chapter in the history of Czech music between the wars] (Brno, 1968)
