= Stanislav Vavřínek =

Stanislav Vavřínek, born 26 February 1972, in Uherské Hradiště, is a Czech conductor and teacher at the department of conducting at the Faculty of Music of the Academy of Music and Dramatic Art in Prague.

Vavřínek first studied flute and conducting at the Brno Conservatory, then he continued his studies at the department of conducting at the Academy of Music and Dramatic Art in Prague (with Eliška, Vajnar, Štych) and afterward he attended courses by Roberto Benzi in Switzerland. He started his profession in 1994 as the Chief Conductor of the Prague Student Orchestra.

Since the beginning of his career he has worked with orchestras including for example the Czech Philharmonic Orchestra, Brno Philharmonic Orchestra, Prague Philharmonia, Prague Symphony Orchestra, Slovak Philharmonic and with exceptional soloists like Ivan Moravec, Igor Ardašev, Eugen Indjic, Gabriela Beňačková, Eva Urbanová, Dagmar Pecková, Ivan Kusnjer, Radek Baborák, Václav Hudeček, Bohuslav Matoušek, Sophia Jaffé, Jiří Bárta, Milan Svoboda etc. He also appeared as a guest conductor in many European countries and Japan and was a guest at many international music festivals (Prague Autumn, Prague Spring etc.). Between 1999 and 2008 he was the Chief Conductor of the Chamber Philharmonic Orchestra of South Bohemia. Since 2008, he has been the Chief Conductor of the Bohuslav Martinů Philharmonic Orchestra and since 2006, a professor at the department of conducting at the Faculty of Music of the Academy of Music and Dramatic Art in Prague.

== Awards ==
- 1st prize with the highest award summa cum laude at the International Competition in Neerpelt, Belgium (1995)
- Two first prizes at the Concerto Bohemia National Radio Competition (1995 and 1996)
- Absolute winner prize (1997) for the performance of Shostakovich Chamber Symphony in C minor for three years

Cultural offices
Preceded by	Principal Conductor, Prague student orchestra 1994–1998	Succeeded by
Preceded by Jaroslav Krček	Chief Conductor, Chamber Philharmonic Orchestra of South Bohemia; 1999–2008	Succeeded by Jan Talich
Preceded by Jakub Hrůša	Chief Conductor, Bohuslav Martinů Philharmonic Orchestra; 2008-present	Succeeded by incumbent
