= Jiří Kollert =

Czech republic pianist

Jiří Kollert (born 2 April 1974 in Brno) is a Czech pianist.

== Biography ==
Graduated from Prague Conservatoire and from Academy of Performing Arts in Prague, he studied also in Paris with Eugen Indjic and with Germaine Mounier, professor at Conservatoire de Paris. He worked with renowned professors as The Juilliard School's Jerome Lowenthal and other outstanding artists.

Jiří Kollert has performed across Europe and in Japan. He has collaborated with leading conductors including Jiří Bělohlávek, Leoš Svárovský, Jakub Hrůša, Serge Baudo, Sachio Fujioka. He performed with Czech Philharmonic Orchestra, Prague Radio Symphony Orchestra, Prague Symphonic Orchestra, Prague Philharmonia, Slovak Philharmonic, New Japan Philharmonic Orchestra, Kanagawa Philharmonic and others. He was invited to perform at international festivals as Prague Spring International Music Festival, Martinů, Yokohama International Piano Concert, EXPO 2005 in Aichi etc.

He has been also a performer of Czech music by Japanese company Octavia Records. His first release was an album of Bohuslav Martinů’s piano works followed by a CD of compositions by Josef Suk. At the same time he edited an album of Suk’s piano works for Zen-on publishing house. In the “Mozart year” of 2006 he participated at numerous projects e.g. recording of CD with Czech Philharmonic Orchestra and a number of concertos and recitals.

Jiří made a set of recordings with Czech music for Japanese TV NHK. The program called “PianoPia” introduced beauties of piano music performed by world's pianists. Kollert's success was included performances to selection of “Pianopia” programs released on its DVD by Sony Music International.

Next to concert career he is also often invited to give masterclasses and to serve in piano competitions’ jury.

== Recordings ==
Bohuslav Martinů - Piano Works (Octavia Records)

Josef Suk - Piano Works (Octavia Records)

W.A.Mozart - Piano Concerto A major K.414, Czech Philharmonic Orchestra (Classical V.A.) SACD Hybrid

W.A.Mozart - Piano Concerto C major K. 467, Czech Philharmonic Orchestra (Phantom)

Pianopia ぴあのピア Vol.8 (Sony Music International)

== Press ==
- Kučerová, Marie Jenovéfa: Jiří Kollert (Harmonie 2005, č. 4, s. 11).
- Pokorný, Petr: Jiří Kollert v Rudolfinu (Hudební rozhledy 5, 2005, č. 5, s. 12–13).
- Procházková, Květa: Vyslanec Bohuslava Martinů v Japonsku (Týdeník Rozhlas, č. 33, 7. 8. 2006).
- Velická, Eva: Interview with...Jiri Kollert (Bohuslav Martinů Newsletter 2007, č. 2, s. 15).
