= Vlastimil Lejsek =

Vlastimil Lejsek (21 July 1927 – 12 March 2010 in Brno) was a Czech composer and pianist.

== Biography ==
Lejsek was born on 21 July 1927 in Brno. He was the son of the Moravian choirmaster František Květoslav Lejsek. He studied at the Brno Conservatory and the Academies of Music in both Prague and Brno with František Schafer, Jan Erml and František Maxián. During his studies he received awards at many competitions, such as the International Smetana Competition (Prague) and Franz Liszt Competition (Budapest).

With his wife, Věra Lejsková, he established a famous piano duo, collaborating with composers such as Milhaud, Britten, Lutoslawski and Shostakovich, and recording for the first time Dvořák's 4-hand works and many more. As a solo pianist, he premiered many works of his colleagues, as well as of his own.

The main body of his musical output consists music for piano duo (like Brazilian Dances, Dances of Masters, Inventions, Moravian Ballades) and piano solo (Preludes, Sonatella, Pianists and Horses, The Moon Suite).

Besides being a composer and a performing and recording pianist, Lejsek also served at the music faculties of the Conservatory and Janáček Academy of Performing Arts in Brno. He was a member of Moravian Composer's Club (founded by Janáček) and also founder of the International Schubert Competition for Piano duos in Jeseník, one of the foremost music events of his country.

His wife is, besides a pianist, a writer, journalist and critic working for both press and radio. Together they were an important and inspiring couple in Czech musical life. Their life and work is depicted in the book "Interviews without piano" by Jan Trojan.

== Selected works ==
Opera

- Noc s Kobr a Štejnem, Rejvízská opera (Rejvíz Opera) for soloists, chorus, piano 4 hands and percussion (1976)

Orchestral

- Stříbrný pochod (Silver March) for wind orchestra (1977); original for piano 4 hands
- Lozíbecký pochod (March from Lozíbek) (1981, 1986); original for piano 4 hands

Concertante

- Brazilské tance (Brazilian Dances) for piano and orchestra (1961, 1990); original for 2 pianos
- Preludia (Preludes) for piano and orchestra (1975, 1985); original for piano solo

Chamber music

- Dvě skladby (2 Pieces) for viola and piano (1959)
- Allegro giocoso for flute and piano (1961)
- Dvě malá dua (2 Little Duos) for violin and piano (1967)
- Na Rejvízu (In Rejviz) for recorder, timpani and piano (1975)
- Duo con brio for clarinet and piano (1979)
- Sonatella for trumpet and piano (1983)
- Preludium, taneček a chorál (Prelude, Little Dance and Choral) for 2 trombones and piano (1983)

Piano solo

- Pět epigramů (5 Epigrams) (1965)
- Ochozská polka (Polka from Ochoz) (1961, 1966); original for 2 pianos
- Sonatina in C (1967)
- Preludia (Preludes) (1975); also for piano and orchestra
- Sešit for Věrku (Book for Věra) (1976)
- Měsíční svita (Moon Suite) (1976)
- Pianisté a koně (Pianists and Horses) (1977)
- Sonatella (1978)
- Espressivo (1983)
- Roční doby (Seasons) (1983)
- Kovbojská svita (Cowboy Suite) (1990)
- 21 reminiscencí klavírního vysloužilce (21 Reminiscences of a Piano Veteran) (1990)
- Písnička ze sklepa (Cellar Songs) (1996)

Piano 4 hands

- Duettina (Duettinos) for piano 4 hands (1966)
- Sonatina for piano 4 hands (1966)
- Duettinka (Little Duettinos) for piano 4 hands (1975)
- Suita z opery Noc s Kobr a Štejnem (Suite from the Opera "Noc s Kobr a Štejnem") (1976)
- Tanec, Serenáda pro Dr. Trojana a Variace (Dance, Serenade for Dr. Trojana and Variation) (1976)
- Quattutor ludibria for piano 4 hands and pipe (1977)
- Stříbrný pochod (Silver March) for piano 4 hands (1977); also orchestrated
- Sonata divertimenta for piano 4 hands (1979)
- Třikrát for dva (Thrice for Two) (2002)
- Dueta (Duets) (1981)
- Pět krátkých tanců (Five Short Dances) (1981)
- Čtverlístek (Quatrefoil) (1983); also for piano 6 hands
- Sonatinka (Little Sonatina) (1983)
- Lozíbecký pochod (March from Lozíbek) (1981); also for orchestra
- Balady z Moravy (Ballads from Moravia) (1991)

Piano 6 hands

- Čtverlístek (Quatrefoil) (1983); original for piano 4 hands

2 Pianos

- Brazilské tance (Brazilian Dances) (1961); orchestrated in 1990
- Ochozská polka (Polka from Ochoz) (1961); also for piano solo
- Invence (Invention) (1962)
- Malá suita (Little Suite) (1962)
- Sonata (1966)
- Toccata in memoriam František Schäfer (1966)
- Orchestys eni orchato for 2 pianos and tape (1966)
- Tanečky mistrů (Masters' Little Dances) (1976)
- Divertimento (1977)
- Svita pro Lipník (Suite for Lipník) (1991)

2 Pianos 8 hands

- Suita domestica for 2 pianos 8 hands (1977)
- Tři věci (3 Movements) for 2 pianos 8 hands (1979)

Vocal

- Dua pro manžele Škrabalovy (Duos for Mrs. Škrabalová) for soprano and bassoon (1967)
- Čtyň slovácké písničky (4 Slovacko Songs) for voice and piano (1977)
- Dvě povídačky (Two Tales) for voice and piano (1978); words by Věra Lejsková
- Na hudební nástroje, hádej, kdo nám zahraje (Guess Who Will Play the Musical Instruments) for voice and piano (1981); words by Věra Lejsková
- Dvé písní z Moravy (2 Songs from Moravia) for voice and piano (1983); words by the composer

Choral

- Co všechno musí udělat jaro for children's chorus and piano (1966); words by František Halas
- Řikadla naučná (Educational Nursery Rhymes) for children's chorus and piano (1975); words by Věra Lejsková
