= Josef Berg =

Czech composer (1927–1971)

Josef Berg

Josef Berg (8 March 1927 – 26 February 1971) was a Czech composer, musicologist and librettist. His work represents a remarkable value in the context of Czech music after World War II.

== Life ==
From 1946 to 1950 he studied at the Brno Conservatory, in the class of Vilém Petrželka. Simultaneously he attended the music lectures at the Faculty of Philosophy on Brno university given by Jan Racek and Bohumír Štědroň. He worked as a music editor in the Czechoslovak Radio in Brno (1950–53), and also wrote reviews for the journals and newspapers. Later he concentrated exclusively on composing. Berg founded an association of young composers called Group A. The members of the group strived in their program to connect convincing artistic activity with the new musical language, and also to promote new musical trends in Czechoslovakia.

== Style ==
Even though the Berg's style was at first influenced by Moravian folk music, his mature compositions are very individual and take advantage of new composition techniques and principles. However, his works are not mere technical exercises. Particularly in chamber music Berg brought spontaneous creative invention. Berg was successful in the field of vocal and scenic music, and composed song cycles to his own lyrics. He also made a number of contributions to the chamber opera genre, including The Return of Ulysses, European Tourism, Breakfast at the Schlankenwald Castle and Euphrides in Front of the Gates of Tymenas.

== Selected works ==
- Months. Piano cycle (1956)
- Seven Preludies for Piano (1959)
- Sextet for Harp, Piano and String Quartet (1959)
- Nonet for Two Harps, Piano, Cembalo, Glockenspiel, Vibraphone, Xylophone and Percussion (1962)
- Return of Ulysses (chamber opera, 1962)
- Songs of new Werther for Baryton and Piano (1962)
- Sonata per cavicembalo e pianoforte in modo classico (1964)
- Organ Music on the Theme of Gilles Binchois (1964)
- European Tourism (a chamber opera, 1963–64)
- String Quartet (1965)
- Breakfast at the Schlankenwald Castle (chamber opera, 1966)
- Johannes Doctor Faust (opera, 1963-1969)
- Dreaming - Snění (1970)

== Footnotes ==
https://web.archive.org/web/20110522214354/http://www.musica.cz/skladatele/berg-josef.html
