= Michaela Fukačová =

Czech cellist

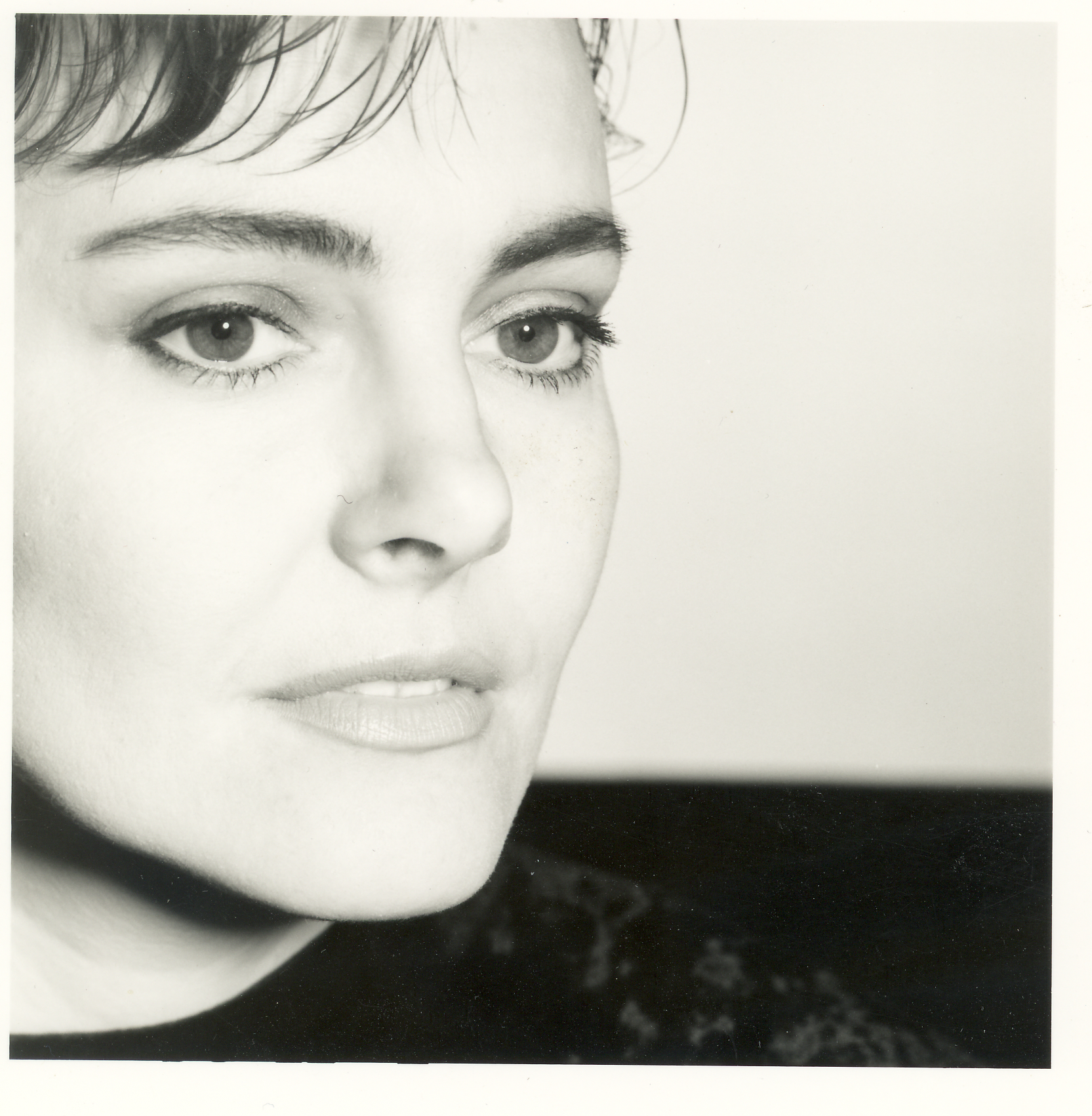

Michaela Fukačová (born 27 March 1959) is a Czech cellist. She took up the cello aged 14, and won the Beethoven Cello Competition two years later. She is a past winner of the Tchaikovsky Competition in Moscow. She studied at the Brno Conservatory, the Music Faculty of the Academy of Performing Arts in Prague (HAMU) under Saša Večtomov, the Royal Danish Academy of Music in Copenhagen, and with André Navarra, Paul Tortelier and Mstislav Rostropovich.

== Awards and prizes ==
- Prague Spring Cello competition 1984
- Tchaikovsky Cello competition, Moscow 1986
- Cello Competition in Scheveningen 1987
- Walter Naumburg Competition, New York 1989 "Leonard Rose price"
- Nordic Biennale, Denmark 1987
- The Danish music critics award, 1988
- Grammy nomination for the best classical album, Denmark 1990
- "Grammy Classic" award for the best soloist of the year, Prague 1994
- Honorary member of the academy in Sorø, Denmark 1995
- Member of The Czech Council of Foreign Relations 1992
- The Gramophone award for the CD with music of Peter Lieberson, 2006
- Grammy 07 nomination for the best classical album of the year, USA
