= Jan Škrdlík =

Jan Škrdlík (born 31 October 1964 in Ostrava) is a Czech cellist, of the younger school of the Czech cello players, an artist, a writer and a teacher.

== Biography ==
=== Background and early life ===
The family came from Slovácko, a rural region in the south of the country. Parents Jaroslav and Anna Škrdlík moved to the city of Ostrava in search of work. The name “Škrdlík” is derived from the word škrle, a tool for the working of millstones used in Moravia in the 12th century, inspired by the sound of metal scratching stone. (Škrdlík's grandfather maintained mill machinery.)

Jan Škrdlík was led to music by his mother, a violin teacher, and he decided to become a professional musician at the age of 17. His teachers Jan Hališka (a professor at the Ostrava Conservatory) and Miroslav Doležil (a primary school teacher) had studied under Bohuš Heran, a private pupil of Hanuš Wihan, founder of the Czech Quartet. The young violoncellist was thus influenced by one of the leading lights of Czech music in modern times.

=== Studies ===
In 1987-1991 he studied at the Janáček Academy of Music and Performing Arts, Brno under Professor Bedřich Havlík, a member of the Moravian Quartet. Brno is capital of Moravia, the southern portion of the Czech lands, and Škrdlík felt strongly influenced by Leoš Janáček his fierce native pride in the area and the inspiration he derived from it, as well as by the whole atmosphere of the city. Further development was shaped by Josef Chuchro and Daniel Veis. An opportunity to study under Spanish virtuoso Lluís Claret in Barcelona proved a milestone on the path to gathering experience and knowledge. Jan Škrdlík's musical career is characterised by his openness to new trends and a constant quest for valid options in musical interpretation.

Jan Škrdlík started to take part in competitions in the late 1980s, both as a solo musician and as part of ensembles, and won his first awards. His greatest success was the Silver Medal and the Special Prize for the best rendering of a Beethoven composition at the prestigious International Beethoven Contest in Hradec. Consistently high standards led to being awarded a year's scholarship visit to Spain in the late 1980s. During his studies in Barcelona, he helped establish the first professional ensemble in Murcia, southern Spain. In 1991, the Czechoslovak Music Foundation awarded him their prize for the promotion of Czech music abroad. Since then, Jan Škrdlík has performed in Europe and beyond, both solo and as part of music ensembles.

== Teaching ==
From 1997 to 2009 Škrdlík taught violoncello and chamber music performance at the Brno Conservatory. Some of his students later collaborated with him on musical projects or became members of ensembles that he led. His international pedagogical activity began in 2003, when he took charge of cello interpretation courses in Murcia, southern Spain.

Since 2004 Škrdlík has co-organised and led music interpretation courses in Opočno; from 2016 these activities have continued in the South Moravian town of Miroslav under the title "Beautiful Tones over Miroslav". The Miroslav interpretation courses are conceived as low-fee residential summer courses for a small string orchestra and chamber ensembles, culminating in public concerts. They bring together participants of different ages and skill levels and emphasise the joy of music-making and mutual support rather than competition or strictly performance-oriented criteria.

Škrdlík’s teaching in these and other courses focuses on the natural musical development of the student and on personal growth, with a relatively low emphasis on theoretical drilling and on criticism of individual performances. In addition to work with conservatory and university students he has also been involved in programmes that use music education as a tool for social inclusion. Within the European URBACT network’s project OnStage – Music Schools for Social Change he provides group cello lessons for Roma children and other pupils from socially disadvantaged backgrounds at primary schools in Brno, applying participatory, low-pressure group teaching methods.

== Writing ==
Jan Škrdlík has written a book of poetry, Tvá slova [“Thy Words”], and several sociologically oriented popular articles, published in Kamínky journal of the Family and Social Care Centre, Brno. He has also written other pieces in Czech and Spanish.

In 2020 he published, in Czech, a further book of poetry. The English version, VARIATIONS ON TZARA • The Son-of-a-Narcissist-Mother’s Guide Book, followed.

=== Poem Sanz Briz and the Smile in the Abyss of Time ===
In September 2013, Jan Škrdlík wrote the poem Sanz Briz and the Smile in the Depths of Time for the Week of Jewish Culture in Brno. The poem deals with the Spanish diplomat who in 1944 saved 5,300 Jews in Budapest. At the event held on 15 September 2013, the author himself recited the poem as part of his cello recital. In October 2013 the poem was first printed in the magazine of the Jewish Community of Brno, Kachol Velavan. Between 2013 and 2016 the poem was recited many times at Jan Škrdlík’s cello recitals. In 2014 it was published in the Spanish university journal Digilec, ISSN 2386-6691, in Czech and in Spanish. In 2015 the poem was recorded in the studio by Alfred Strejček. In 2015 Marjolein de Roos translated the poem into Dutch. In the same year, the American composer of Jewish origin Hayden Wayne wrote a melodrama based on the English text of the poem Sanz Briz and the Smile in the Depths of Time. In 2016 the Mexican composer and guitarist Omar Rojas wrote another melodrama on the Spanish text of the poem. On 11 November 2016 Richard Wilson recited the English version of the poem in the prestigious Shire Hall in Hereford, England, during an evening dedicated to the memory of Ángel Sanz Briz. The event attracted considerable response in the English press. Peter Williams, editor of the Hereford Times, for example, wrote of the poem as having "an almost unbearable poignancy to a deeply moving experience". In 2016 the Mexican composer Omar Rojas wrote yet another, his second, melodrama on the text of the poem Sanz Briz and the Smile in the Depths of Time. In February 2017 the chamber orchestra Brněnští komorní sólisté, Richard Wilson (English version) and Alfred Strejček (Czech version) made a recording of Omar Rojas’s melodrama Sanz Briz for a CD released by the label Art Petra.

On 12 January 2018, Ángel Sanz-Briz’s daughter Pilar sent a letter to Jan Škrdlík, in which she wrote, among other things: “Dear Sir... ...Your poem has moved us deeply. It is a poem of great human sincerity. You have captured in it our father’s youth at the moment when all those terrible events were taking place, and also the motives which, from somewhere deep in his soul, led him to strive to save so many innocent lives... ...Pilar Sanz-Briz”.

=== Variations on Tzara ===
Variations on Tzara (2020) by Jan Škrdlík is a verse novel that connects the material, psychological and spiritual dimensions and loosely follows on from Tristan Tzara’s collection Approximate Man. Its main character is the Pilgrim, whose journey through the Seven Heavens – inspired, among other things, by the motif of the seven chakras – takes place on the border between dream and memory, inner wound and reconciliation. The text develops the author’s poetics of “new suprarealism” and thematises the search for identity, freedom and human dignity in situations where reality breaks between the visible and the hidden.

The English edition of the book was published as a second, revised and expanded edition in 2025 by the publishing house Hudební Kovárna (Musical Forge). The text is accompanied by illustrations by Jana Rosie Škrdlík Dvořáková.

In its English version, this philosophical–existential verse novel received recognition in the globally open literary competition American Writing Awards 2025, held in the United States, in the Poetry–Narrative category.

The American Writing Awards competition is an international literary platform whose aim is to give recognition to authors and publishers worldwide and to offer some of the most inclusive and influential literary competitions and author–publisher services worldwide. The organisers described the 2025 year as a breakthrough edition, with a record number of submitted titles and a marked increase in both participation and quality, which underlines the significance of any distinction awarded in that year. The competition is conceived as international and includes a number of genre categories in which the jury evaluates books published in English.

American Writing Awards designates with the status “Finalist” those books that the expert jury has assessed as among the very best within a globally open competition category. Under the rules of the competition, in each category a single winning title (Winner) is announced, alongside a group of other distinguished books; the size of this group depends on the jury’s point scoring and on the number of submitted titles in the given category. Within this group, the order of books in the list does not indicate their ranking; all carry equally the status "Finalist". In the official overview "2025 AWA Winners and Finalists", Škrdlík’s book is listed among the titles with this status in the Poetry–Narrative category.

In June 2026, American Book Fest announced Variations on Tzara in their list of winners and finalists of the 2026 International Book Awards in the category 'Poetry: Narrative'.

== Social involvement and scholarship ==
Jan Škrdlík's social involvement and scholarly activities have had indirect influences on the direction and nature of his music. They fall into three categories.

- Charity and welfare
  - He is an engaged and active participant in charity and welfare activities. These include, for example, religiously based performances in the Břeclav prison, in collaboration with Father Jan Majer, and heading a club for Roma children under the aegis of the Brno Evangelist church in 2000-2009 that included a religious programme and music in its agenda. He has helped set up and organise musical events such as the Effatha festival and the 'Music not just for the Angels' concert cycle, still in progress.
- Academic development and language
  - An interest in languages led him to enrol at Masaryk University, Brno to study linguistics and the Romance languages, with special reference to Spanish language and literature in 2008. Seeking to exercise his talent and expand general language knowledge, he accepted a part-time job as teacher of Spanish at the Moravské gymnázium, Brno in late 2007.
- Academic development and the science of acoustics
  - Jan Škrdlík conducts research into string tuning and the subjective influences of frequencies and harmonics. Working with other experts, such as musicologist Luděk Zenkl and cembalist Barbara Maria Willi, he addresses the tuning of historical instruments and its relationship to harmonic sets. His Využití intonačních pásem ve hře na smyčcové nástroje ["Usage of Tuning Bands in String Instruments"] sums up the results, which he applies further in several ways:
    - In pedagogical matters, his attention is upon the relationship between his results and psychology.
    - In concert, he employs a phenomenon known as "differential oscillations", which he calls “natural vibrato”. This can colour every note interpreted to a greater or lesser extent, and may be taken further to shape any given music phrase.
    - The results of his research are primarily employed in the construction of violoncellos and other stringed instruments. They find particular application in the use of a fifth eurhythmic string led below the fingerboard, tuned (separately on either side of the bridge) in such fashion that its vibrations favourably influence the production of a tone.
    - As of 2025, Škrdlík plays a modified cello with six strings; two of them providing sympathetic resonance in addition to the more usual four.

== Concerts ==
The number of concerts that Jan Škrdlík has given over the past twenty years runs easily into four figures. His first public performance took place in spring 1990, shortly after returning from Murcia, in Spain (1988–89), where he had been studying and where he had also helped start a professional ensemble, the first of its kind there. He then toured Czechoslovakia with piano player Pedro Valer Abril, with whom he also recorded Prokofiev's Piano Sonata No. 9 in C major, Op. 103, in the Olomouc studio of Czech Broadcasting [Český rozhlas]. Some months later he joined the Wallinger Quartet, a highly respected chamber music ensemble, a position that brought with it many opportunities to perform in the Czech Republic and beyond in the early 1990s. The Wallinger Quartet played concerts all over central, western and south-western Europe and performed regularly in the USA.

The Wallinger Quartet concerts apart, Jan Škrdlík also performed in violoncello recitals and later became a soloist with various orchestras. The recitals included concerts with the piano played by Renata Ardaševová, among other leading pianists, and concerts with the cembalo played by Barbara Maria Willi. Jan Škrdlík also collaborated with other chamber music ensembles and helped establish, among others, Ardor musicus, the Czech Baroque Trio, the Gideon Trio and Ensemble Messiaen. In 2004 he help establish the ensemble known as the Brno Chamber Soloists ensemble, which specialises in 19th- and 20th-century music. A year later he toured the US with them as soloist; in the course of six weeks he performed on 35 stages and critics in Miami lauded his performance as "a sensation".

A list of Jan Škrdlík concerts covering the period January 1994 - June 2009 may be found in Povoláním – člověk, biografie violoncellisty Jana Škrdlíka ["Vocation: – Ordinary Man: A Biography of Jan Škrdlík"], written by Radoslav Kvěch.

For some years Škrdlík has had a regular duo partnership with Petra Besa.

== Recordings ==
=== Films and multimedia concerts ===
In 2007, the theft of Jan Škrdlík's violoncello inspired what was possibly the first instrumental classical music video in history. The instrument, a precious product of the craft of Adam Emanuel Homolka in 1842, was stolen from his studio; news of the crime merited a spot on TV news and the violoncello was returned. A year later, this led to the innovative Claude Debussy – Sonate pour violoncelle et piano, set as a short film narrative, with mime, an imaginative performance based on events around the theft. A Czech-Slovak team, including Czech film director Milan Růžička, created the film, which Škrdlík later used as part of multimedia concerts; it was employed as back-projection for live performances. Several films made for similar purposes followed.

=== CDs ===
Škrdlík has recorded for several labels. His CD performance of Bach's Suites was noted outside the Czech Republic. He recorded in the studios of Czech Broadcasting regularly in the 1990s.

=== Discography ===
- CDs with solo cello compositions:
  - JANÁČEK-MARTINŮ-KODÁLY, Jan Škrdlík, Cello, Renata Ardaševová, Piano, Edice Českého rozhlasu, 1998
  - J.S.BACH – CELLO SUITES, Jan Škrdlík, Cello, Gnosis, 2002
  - MYSLIVEČEK-SUK-JANÁČEK-ŠTĚDROŇ, Brno Chamber Soloists (Brněnští komorní sólisté), Jan Škrdlík, Cello, Gnosis, 2004
  - HAYDEN WAYNE – DANCES FOR CELLO AND PIANO & STRING QUINTET, Jan Škrdlík, Cello, Petra Besa Pospíšilová, Piano, WALLINGER QUARTET, New Millennium, 2004
  - J.CH.BACH-MOZART-JANÁČEK-ŠTĚDROŇ, Brno Chamber Soloists (Brněnští komorní sólisté), Michiko Otaki, Piano, Jan Škrdlík, Cello, Art Petra Production, 2005
  - MILOŠ ŠTĚDROŇ – AUSTERLITZ, Jan Škrdlík, Cello, Studio π vox, 2007
  - J.S. BACH – CELLO SUITES & SAMPLER, Double CD, Tenth label anniversary recording, Jan Škrdlík, Cello, Brno Chamber Soloists [Brněnští komorní sólisté], Renata Ardaševová, Piano, and others, Art Petra Production, 2006
  - BEETHOVEN-DEBUSSY-FRANCK. Jan Škrdlík, Cello, Petra Besa Pospíšilová, Piano, Art Petra Production, 2006
- CDs with the Wallinger Quartet:
  - LEOŠ JANÁČEK – STRING QUARTETS, WALLINGER QUARTET, Pavel Wallinger and Jan Vašta, Violin, Miroslav Kovář, Viola, Jan Škrdlík, Cello, Musica, 1993
  - W.A. MOZART – STRING QUARTETS, WALLINGER QUARTET, Pavel Wallinger and Jan Vašta, Violin, Miroslav Kovář, Viola, Jan Škrdlík, Cello, Monitor Records, 1993
  - DVOŘÁK-BRAHMS, Jiří Šlégl, Clarinet, WALLINGER QUARTET, Pavel Wallinger and Jan Vašta, Violin, Miroslav Kovář, Viola, Jan Škrdlík, Cello, Tonus, 2002
  - HAYDEN WAYNE – STRING QUARTETS #1, #2, WALLINGER QUARTET, Pavel Wallinger and Jan Vašta, Violin, Miroslav Kovář, Viola, Jan Škrdlík, Cello, New Millennium, 1998
  - HAYDEN WAYNE – STRING QUARTETS #3, #4, #5, WALLINGER QUARTET, Pavel Wallinger and Jan Vašta, Violin, Miroslav Kovář, Viola, Jan Škrdlík, Cello, New Millennium, 1999
  - HAYDEN WAYNE – STRING QUARTETS #6, #7, #8, WALLINGER QUARTET, Pavel Wallinger and Jan Vašta, Violin, Miroslav Kovář, Viola, Jan Škrdlík, Cello, New Millennium, 2000
  - HAYDEN WAYNE – STRING QUARTETS #9, #10, WALLINGER QUARTET, Pavel Wallinger and Jan Vašta, Violin, Miroslav Kovář, Viola, Jan Škrdlík, Cello, New Millennium, 2001
- CDs with the Gideon String Trio:
  - KLEIN-HAYDN-MATYS-SCHUBERT, GIDEON STRING TRIO, Pavel Wallinger, Violin, Karel Plocek, Viola, Jan Škrdlík, Cello, Gnosis, 2004
  - BEETHOVEN-MATYS, GIDEON STRING TRIO, Pavel Wallinger, Violin, Karel Plocek, Viola, Jan Škrdlík, Cello, Karel Plocek, 2007
- CDs with the Czech Baroque Trio:
  - KRAMÁŘ-JÍROVEC-KOŽELUH-VAŇHAL, CZECH BAROQUE TRIO, Antonín Rous, Violin, Jan Škrdlík, Cello, Martin Jakubíček, hammerklavier, Studio Matouš, 2001
  - FRANTIŠEK BENDA – VIOLIN SONATAS, CZECH BAROQUE TRIO, Antonín Rous, Violin, Jan Škrdlík, Cello, Martin Jakubíček, Harpsichord, Positive, Studio Matouš, 1999
- CDs with other ensembles:
  - MILOSLAV IŠTVÁN – CHAMBER MUSIC, Wallinger Quartet, Dama Dama, Mondschein, Jiří Richter-Viola, Martin Opršál-Percussion, Emil Drápela-Clarinet, Dana Drápelová-Piano, Studio Matouš, 1999
  - MILOŠ ŠTĚDROŇ – VILLANELLE PER WILLI, Barbara Willi-Harpsichord, Štěpán Graffe-Violin, Jan Vašta- Violin, Jan Škrdlík-Cello, Ctibor Bártek-Percussion, Studio π vox, 2006

== Sources ==
- Trojan, Jan (2010). "UDÁLOSTI Violoncellista Jan Škrdlík na cestě" [EVENTS Cellist Jan Škrdlík on the road]. opus musicum 2/2010. Archived from the original on 2010-12-10.
