= Jakub Hrůša =

Czech conductor (born 1981)

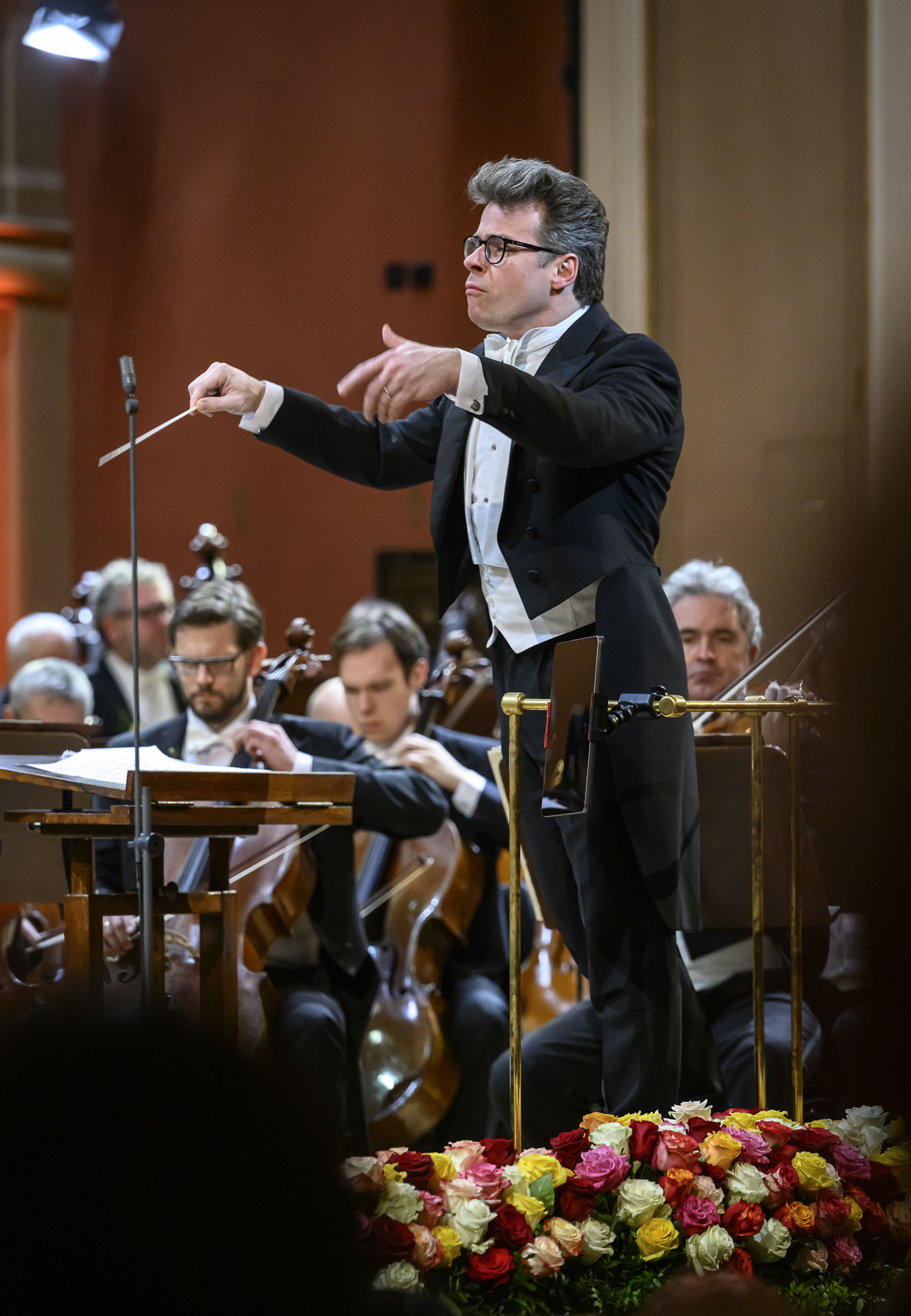
- Jakub Hrůša (2024)
- Born: 23 July 1981 (age 45); Brno
- Education: Academy of Performing Arts in Prague
- Occupation: Conductor
- Organizations: Bamberg Symphony; Czech Philharmonic; Philharmonia Orchestra; Royal Opera House

Jakub Hrůša (born 23 July 1981) is a Czech conductor. He is chief conductor of the Bamberg Symphony, the music director of the Royal Opera House and the music director designate of the Czech Philharmonic (2028/29).

== Education ==
Hrůša was born in Brno on 23 July 1981 in Brno, the son of the architect Petr Hrůša. There were no professional musicians in his family who were drawn mainly from technical and scientific sectors. Hrůša studied piano and trombone, and developed an interest in conducting, during his years at Gymnázium třída Kapitána Jaroše in Brno. While at school he had lessons with Evžen Holiš, an experienced repetiteur and conductor at the National Theatre in his home city, where he became familiar with the work and atmosphere of an opera house.

He entered the Academy of Performing Arts in Prague at age 18, where his teachers included Jiří Bělohlávek (from his second year) for conducting, Radomil Eliška and Leoš Svárovský. In 2000 he participated in the Prague Spring International Music Festival conducting competition. In 2003, he was a prizewinner in the International Competition of Young Conductors Lovro von Matačić in Zagreb. He has researched the work of contemporary Czech composers for a dissertation. He acknowledged his debt to Bělohlávek's teaching at the academy, and admired him for taking care to teach, not just to give masterclasses, and his generosity: "... in sharing ideas, inviting me to rehearsals, and actually I remember observing him work on Katya Kabanová in Helsinki with Karita Mattila. I owe him a lot."

== Career ==
Hrůša's first conducting position after graduation was with the Bohuslav Martinů Philharmonic orchestra of Zlín, with which he toured Spain in 2004; during long bus trips, he and the players were able to bond before he took up his post officially in 2005. He also began to build up his experience in the Czech Republic, where he conducted Janáček's The Cunning Little Vixen in 2005 and Marcel Mihalovici's Krapp, or The Last Tape, at the National Theatre in Prague. He also worked as an associate conductor with the Czech Philharmonic. From 2005 to 2006, he was an associate conductor with the Orchestre Philharmonique de Radio France, his first international appointment. In April 2006, he signed a six-CD recording contract with Supraphon, where the first three CDs were with the Prague Philharmonia. From 2005 to 2008, Hrůša was principal guest conductor of the Prague Philharmonia, then chief conductor from 2008 to 2015. He became principal guest conductor of the Czech Philharmonic with the 2015–2016 season.

In February 2009, Hrůša was named the music director of Glyndebourne on Tour, effective January 2010. In September 2011, he was named the next music director of the Royal Danish Opera and of the Royal Danish Orchestra, effective September 2013. However, in January 2012, in the wake of the resignation of Keith Warner from the artistic directorship of the Royal Danish Opera following proposed budget cuts, Hrůša announced that he would not take the post, in solidarity with Warner's action.

In September 2015, after five appearances as a guest conductor, Hrůša was named the next chief conductor of the Bamberg Symphony, from the 2016–2017 season, with an initial contract of four seasons. This was extended firstly to the 2025–2026 season, then through to the 2028–2029 season.

In March 2017, the Philharmonia Orchestra announced the appointment of Hrůša as one of its two new principal guest conductors, effective with the 2017–2018 season. In July 2021, the Orchestra dell'Accademia Nazionale di Santa Cecilia announced the appointment of Hrůša as its next principal guest conductor, effective with the 2021/22 season, with an initial contract of three seasons. His Proms debut in 2017 was an unconventional programme of the Hussite Chorale 'Ktož jsú Boži bojovníci', Smetana's Tábor and Blaník from Má vlast, Martinů's Field Mass, Dvořák's Hussite Overture, Janáček's Song of the Hussites and Suk's Praga. His next Prom concert in 2019 consisted of the complete Má vlast preceded by Dvořák's Violin Concerto.

Hrůša first guest-conducted at the Royal Opera House (ROH) in February 2018, in a production of Bizet's Carmen. He returned to the ROH in April 2022 to conduct Wagner's Lohengrin. In October 2022, the ROH announced the appointment of Hrůša as its next music director, effective in September 2025, taking the title of music director designate with immediate effect.

In 2020, a bi-lingual (Czech–English) anthology entitled Hrůša on Martinů was published, consisting of essays on Bohuslav Martinů by Hrůša, and an interview in his role as president of the International Martinů Circle. Although he had not conducted a Martinů opera in a theatre at the time of publication, he had conducted several performances of Martinů's symphonies. In June 2025, the Czech Philharmonic announced the appointment of Hrůša as its next chief conductor and music director, effective with the 2028–2029 season, with an initial contract of five seasons.

== Personal life ==
Hrůša and his wife Klára Hrůšová have two children. The family has a residence in London.

== Selected discography ==
- Dvořák – Czech Suite, Valčíky (waltzes), Polonéza (polonaise). Prague Philharmonia. Supraphon SU 3867-2 (2006).
- Dvořák – Suite in A, Op 98b; Josef Suk – Serenade for Strings, Fantastic Scherzo. Prague Philharmonia. Supraphon SU 3882-2 (2006).
- Dvořák – Serenade for Strings, Serenade for Winds, Meditations on the St Wenceslas Chorale. Prague Philharmonia. Supraphon SU 3932-2 (2008).
- Janáček – Lachian Dances, The Cunning Little Vixen suite (František Jílek version), Taras Bulba. Brno Philharmonic. Supraphon SU 3923-2 (2009).
- Bohuslav Martinů, Josef Bohuslav Foerster, Viteszlav Novak – Cello Concertos. Jiří Bárta, Prague Philharmonia. Supraphon SU 3989-2 (2009).
- Smetana – Ma Vlast. Prague Philharmonia. Supraphon SU 4032-2 (2010).
- Dvořák Cello Concerto & Lalo Cello Concerto. Johannes Moser, Prague Philharmonia. Pentatone PTC 5186488 (2015)
- Dvořák – Three Slavonic Rhapsodies & Symphonic Variations. Prague Philharmonia. Pentatone PTC 5186554 (2016)
- Dvořák – Overtures (In Nature's Realm, Carnival, Othello, My Home, Hussite Overture). Prague Philharmonia. Pentatone PTC 5186532 (2016).
- Bartók Concerto for Orchestra & Kodály Concerto for Orchestra. Rundfunk-Sinfonieorchester Berlin. Pentatone PTC 5186626 (2018).

== Awards and recognition ==
- Medal of Merit (2025)

Cultural offices
Preceded by Tomáš Koutník	Chief Conductor, Bohuslav Martinů Philharmonic; 2005–2008	Succeeded by Stanislav Vavřínek
Preceded by Kaspar Zehnder	Chief Conductor, Prague Philharmonia; 2008–2015	Succeeded by Emmanuel Villaume
Preceded by Robin Ticciati	Music Director, Glyndebourne on Tour; 2010–2012	Succeeded by Ben Glassberg (principal conductor)
Preceded by Jonathan Nott	Chief Conductor, Bamberg Symphony; 2016–present	Succeeded by incumbent
Preceded by Antonio Pappano	Music Director, Royal Opera House, Covent Garden; 2025–present	Succeeded by incumbent
