= Leoš Janáček International Competition in Brno =

Annual music competition in Brno, Czech Republic

The Leoš Janáček International Competition in Brno (hereinafter referred to as MSLJ) (Czech: Mezinárodní soutěž Leoše Janáčka v Brně) is a music competition held annually by the Faculty of Music of the Janáček Academy of Performing Arts in Brno. The MSLJ was named after the famous composer Leoš Janáček.

Ten disciplines, piano, organ, violoncello, double-bass, flute, clarinet, string quartet, violin, French horn and tuba, rotate in five-year cycles.

There is an age limit of 36 (on the opening day of the competition) for the solo disciplines; for string quartets, the sum of members’ ages must not exceed 140 years.
