= Doubravice nad Svitavou =

- Market town
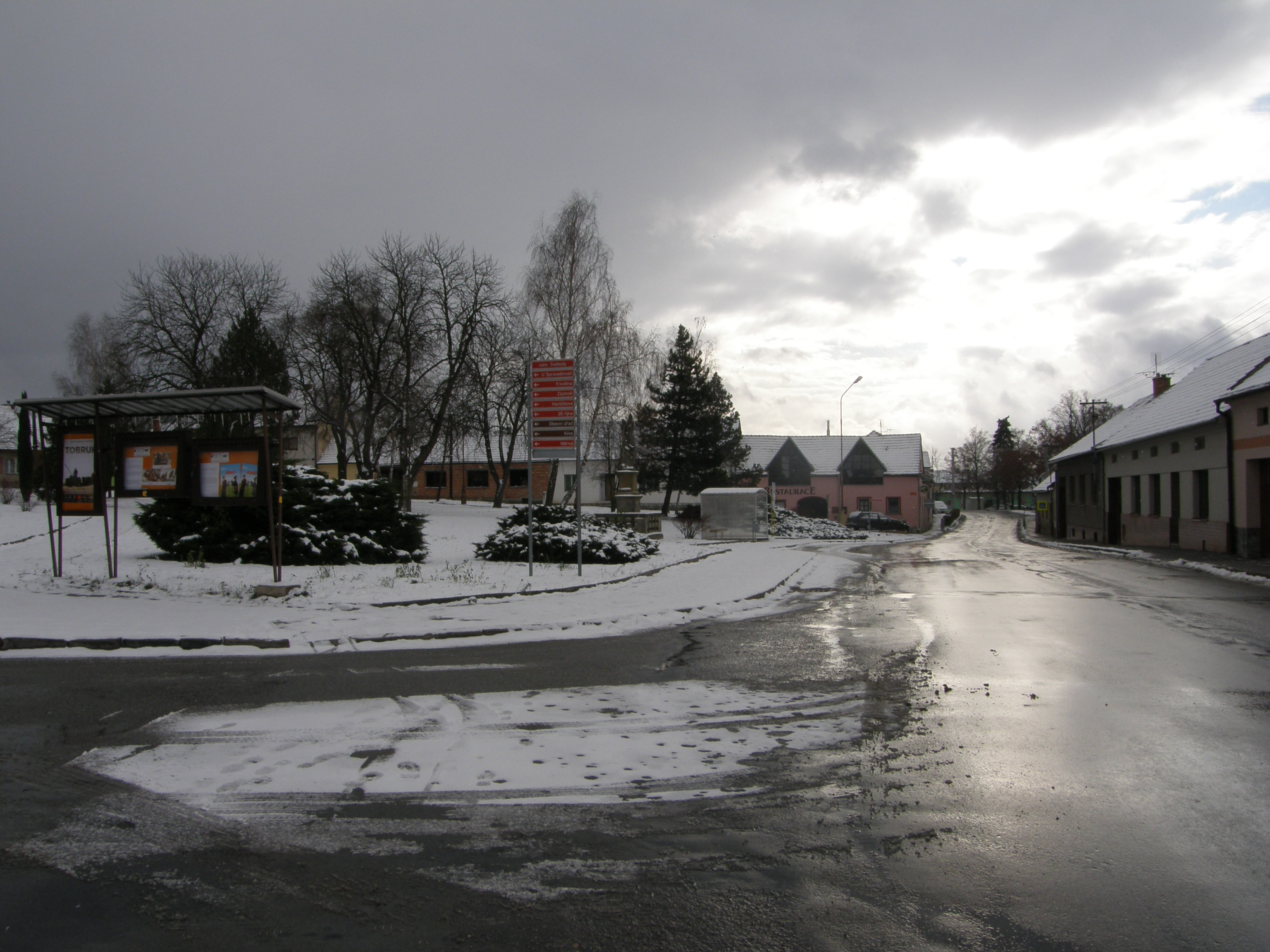
- Town square

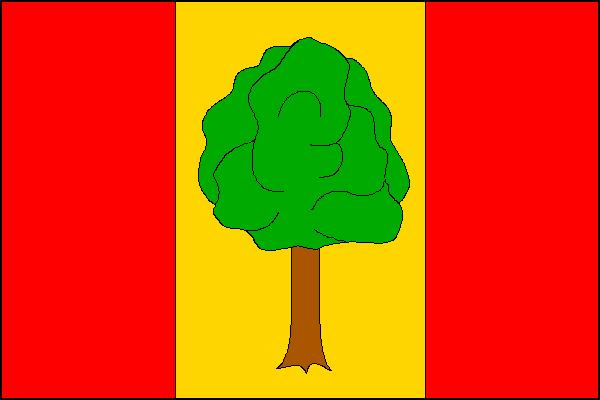
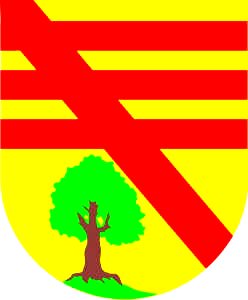
- Flag Coat of arms

- Location in the Czech Republic
- Coordinates: 49°26′12″N 16°37′46″E
- Country: Czech Republic
- Region: South Moravian
- District: Blansko
- First mentioned: 1293

Area
  - Total: 10.69 km^{2} (4.13 sq mi)
- Elevation: 315 m (1,033 ft)

Population (2026-01-01)
  - Total: 1,294
  - Density: 121.0/km^{2} (313.5/sq mi)
- Time zone: UTC+1 (CET)
  - Summer (DST): UTC+2 (CEST)
- Postal code: 679 11
- Website: www.doubravicens.cz

Doubravice nad Svitavou (Czech pronunciation: [ˈdoubravɪtsɛ ˈnat svɪtavou]) is a market town in Blansko District in the South Moravian Region of the Czech Republic. It has about 1,300 inhabitants. The market town is located on the Svitava River.

== Etymology ==
The name Doubravice is derived from the Czech word doubrava, meaning 'oak forest'.

== Geography ==
Doubravice nad Svitavou is located about 8 kilometres (5 mi) north of Blansko and 24 km (15 mi) north of Brno. It lies mostly in the Drahany Highlands, only the western part of the municipal territory extends into the Boskovice Furrow. The highest point is at 576 m (1,890 ft) above sea level. The Svitava River flows through the market town.

== History ==
The first trustworthy written mention of Doubravice is from 1293; older references are not credible. In 1371, it was first referred to as a market town. Until 1463, the owners often changen. From 1463 to 1624, Doubravice was a property of the Bítovský of Slavníkovice family. During the Thirty Years' War, the market town was badly damaged. In 1669, it became part of a larger estate owned by the Carthusian monastery in Olomouc, which remained so until the establishment of an independent municipality in 1848.

== Demographics ==
Historical population

Year	Pop.	±%
1869	1,007	—
1880	1,021	+1.4%
1890	1,087	+6.5%
1900	1,137	+4.6%
1910	1,202	+5.7%

Year	Pop.	±%
1921	1,272	+5.8%
1930	1,437	+13.0%
1950	1,331	−7.4%
1961	1,365	+2.6%
1970	1,337	−2.1%

Year	Pop.	±%
1980	1,233	−7.8%
1991	1,179	−4.4%
2001	1,219	+3.4%
2011	1,277	+4.8%
2021	1,307	+2.3%

Source: Censuses

== Transport ==
Doubravice nad Svitavou is located on the railway line heading from Letovice to Křenovice via Brno.

== Sights ==
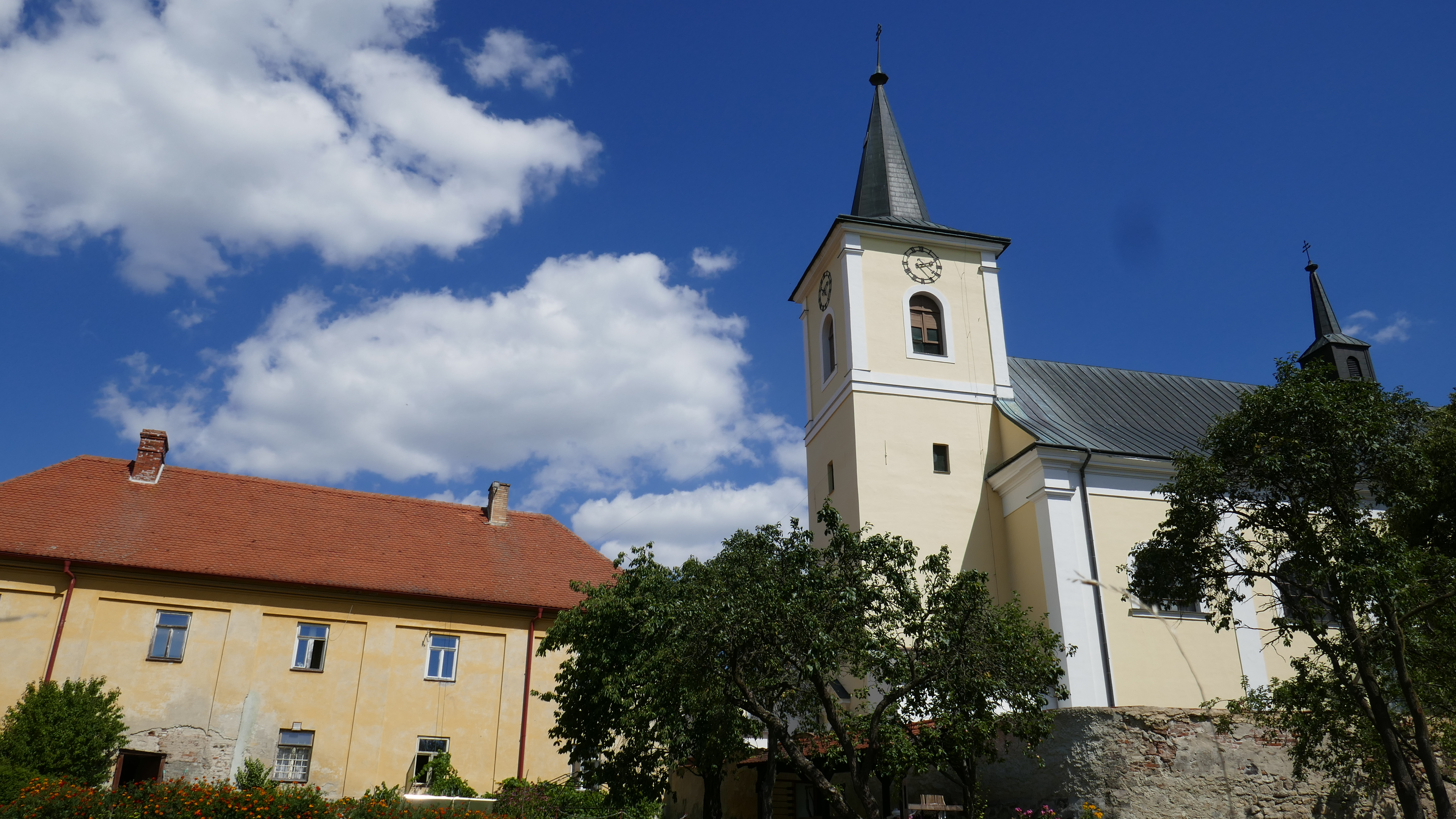
Church of Saint John the Baptist with the rectory

The main landmark of the market town is the Church of Saint John the Baptist. It was built in the Baroque style in 1717 and reconstructed after a fire in 1760.

A cultural monument is the ruin of the Doubravice Castle. The castle was founded in the middle of the 13th century and abandoned before 1526. Based on some documents, historians believe that it was burned down as early as 1447. The torso of the tower and the surrounding walls have been preserved.

== Notable people ==
- Jan Kunc (1883–1976), composer and pedagogue
