= Igor Ardašev =

Czech pianist

Igor Ardašev (born in Brno, 1967) is a Czech pianist.

== Biography ==
He studied at the Brno Conservatory as a pupil of Inessa Janíčková, later he pursued his studies at the Janáček Academy of Music and Performing Arts. He was awarded the 1987 International Tchaikovsky Competition's 5th prize and the 1988 Prague Spring Competition's 3rd prize. He was subsequently prized at the 1990 Maria Callas, 1991 Queen Elisabeth (6th) and 1995 Long-Thibaud (4th) competitions.

Ardašev is internationally active as a concert pianist since 1990. He performed on concert tours and recitals in various countries in Europe, America and Japan. He cooperates with the Czech recording label Supraphon, for which he records mainly the arrangements of Czech orchestral repertoire for piano duet, together with his wife Renata Ardaševová. Ardašev also collaborated with notable Czech-American pianist Rudolf Firkušný. A DVD is available of Ardašev performing the Dvorak piano concerto with the Prague Symphony Orchestra under Petr Altrichter (ArtHaus Musik 102 139).
