= Johann Gottlieb =

Austrian chemist (1815–1875)

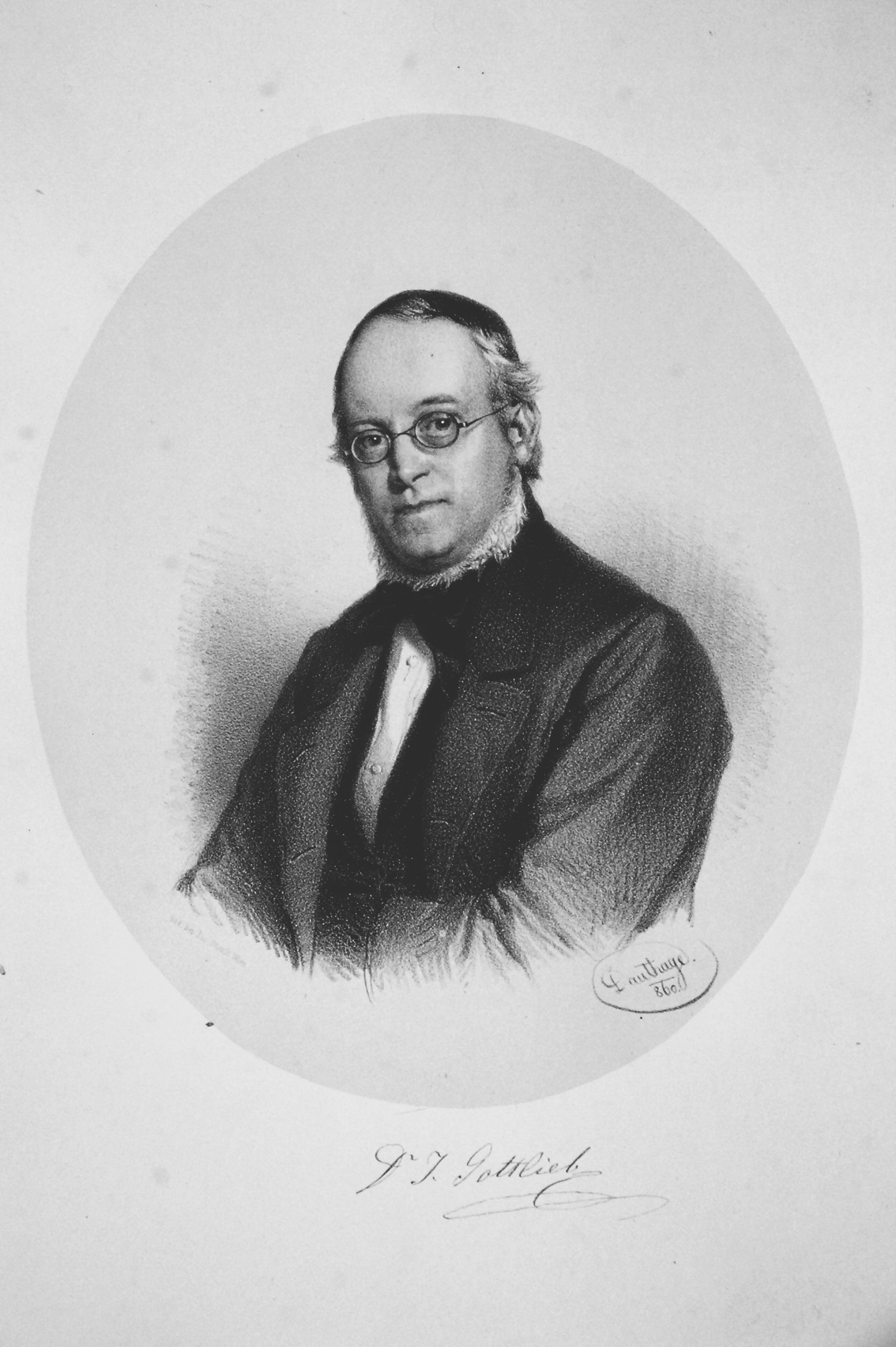
- Lithography of Johann Gottlieb (1860)
- Born: 15 February 1815; Brno, Bohemia, Austrian Empire
- Died: 4 March 1875 (aged 60); Graz, Austria-Hungary
- Education: University of Prague, University of Vienna
- Known for: synthesizing Propionic acid, discovering Paramylon
- Scientific career
- Fields: organic chemistry
- Workplaces: Graz University of Technology

Johann Gottlieb (15 February 1815 – 4 March 1875) was an Austrian chemist who first synthesized Propionic acid. He is also known for describing and naming Paramylon.

== Biography ==
Gottlieb was born in Brno as son to a pharmacist. He completed his Matura at the local Gymnasium and was supposed to take over his father’s business. He studied thus first pharmacy then chemistry under professor Adolf Martin Pleischl in Vienna. He later continued his studies also in Prague. His plans to pursue a scientific career led to disapproval and a lack of (financial) support by his father. He thus soon became assistant to Josef Redtenbacher, obtained his doctorate in 1841 (from the University of Vienna) and, upon completing his habilitation qualified for a private lecturer at the University of Prague.

At the Joanneum in Graz, the chair of physics and chemistry held by Anton Schrötter was split into one for physics and one for chemistry following Schrötter’s appointment at the Vienna Polytechnic in 1843. In early 1846, Gottlieb was appointed professor for general and technical chemistry to that newly created chair. He first reorganised the laboratory formerly used for physical and chemical purposes. This and his work on textbooks lead to a period of reduced scientific publication activity. Gottlieb then also engaged somewhat in politics serving as a member to the Styrian federal state parliament in 1848 where he represented a moderate liberal political position.

In 1867/68 Gottlieb was elected director of the Joanneum, and served as its rector again in 1874/75 when the Joanneum acquired its new status of a royal technical college. Gottlieb heavily contributed to the reorganisation coming with that new status. On 3rd March 1875, Gottlieb broke down in his office and died the next day in his home following a stroke. Johann Gottlieb was married and a father of six.

Johann Gottlieb was remembered as a passionate researcher, restless worker and an excellent rhetorician. His Guide to Qualitative Chemical Analysis (Leitfaden der qualitativen Analyse (1869)) provided insights to his didactic experiences and counts among some rare documents of university teaching and laboratory exercises of its time. Gottlieb thus followed and shared Justus von Liebig’s approaches in chemistry education which were introduced to universities and technical colleges in the Austrian Empire in the early 1840s. It was Johann Gottlieb to convince Leopold von Pebal, his later assistant, to pursue a career in chemistry.

== Scientific contribution ==
Johann Gottlieb was the first to describe Propionic acid. Some of his findings on fatty acids and their melting point were further expanded by Wilhelm Heinrich Heintz.

Based on his scientific exchange with Ludwig Karl Schmarda during Schmarda’s time in Graz, Johann Gottlieb published his work on Paramylon.

Gottlieb was also the most prolific Austrian textbook writer of his time and his Vollständiges Taschenbuch der Chemischen Technologie (1852) was the first of its kind in the German speaking region.

== Honours ==
- Member of the Austrian Academy of Sciences, Vienna (since 1856)
- Order of Franz Joseph, (Knight, 1870)
- Honorary Member of the German Pharmacists Association

== Selected publications ==
- Untersuchung des Gänsefettes und der Oelsäure (1846)
- Ueber eine neue, mit Stärkmehl isomere Substanz (1850)
- Beiträge zur Kenntniss der isomeren Säuren (1851, 1853)
- Vollständiges Taschenbuch der Chemischen Technologie (1852)
- Lehrbuch der reinen und technischen Chemie (1853)
- Polizeilich-chemische Skizzen (1853)
- Lehrbuch der pharmazeutischen Chemie (1857)
- Lehrbuch der pharmazeutischen Chemie mit besonderer Berücksichtigung der österreichischen, preußischen und sächsischen Pharmakopöen (1859)
