= Zdeňka Podkapová =

Czech model (born 1977)

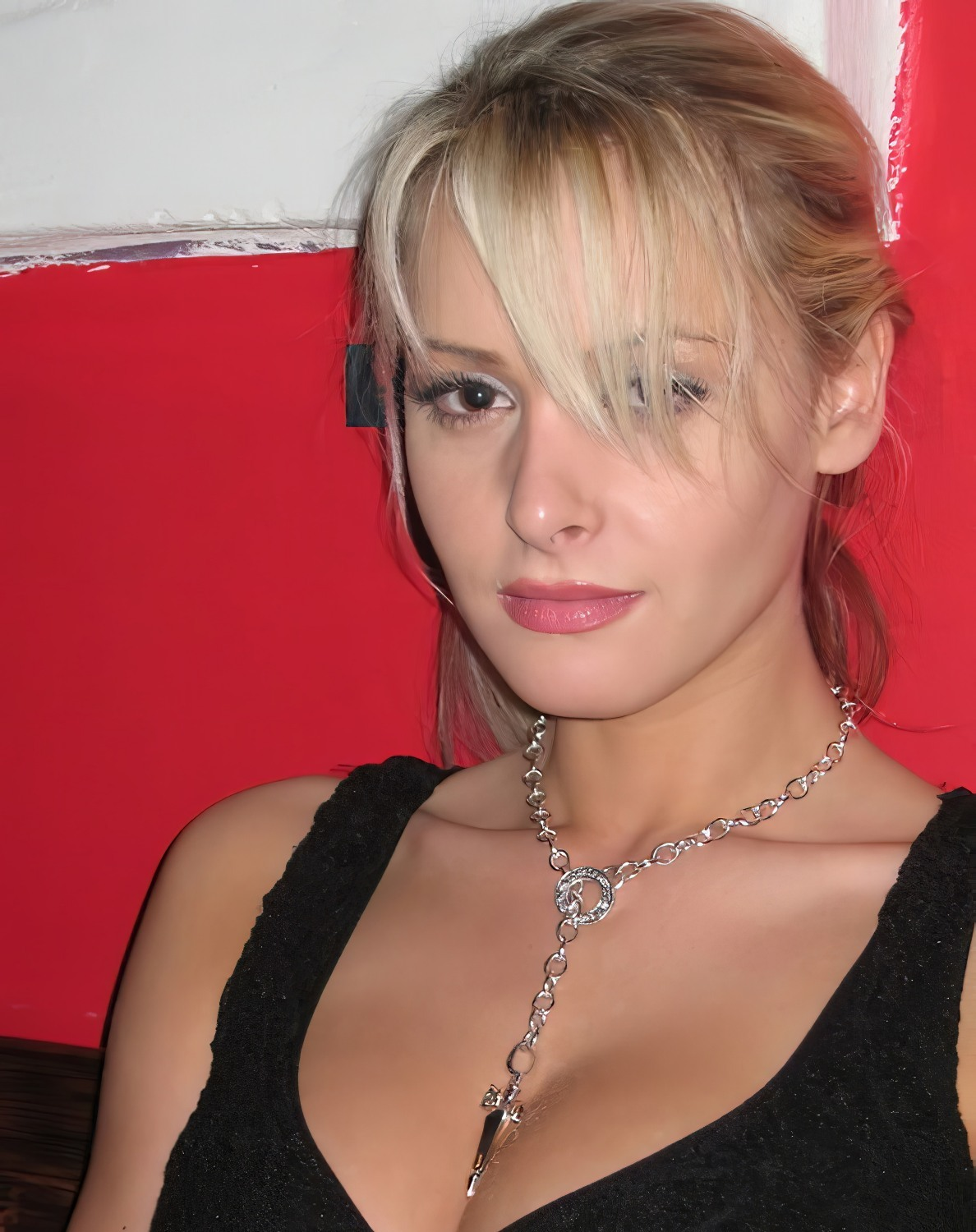
- Born: 6 August 1977 (age 48); Brno, Czechoslovakia
- Other names: Zdenka, Zdenka Popová, Zdenka Novotná
- Height: 5 ft 6 in (1.68 m)

Zdeňka Podkapová (born 6 August 1977) (also credited as Zdenka, Zdeňka Popová or Zdeňka Novotná) is a Czech adult model, actress and former gymnast.

== Career ==
In 1996, she posed for her first photoshoot, and in 1998 tried contacting Penthouse magazine. Her first pictorials for Penthouse were published in May 1998. She was chosen as Penthouse Pet of the Month. Two years later, she won Penthouse Pet of the Year in 2001. "It was a very big surprise for me and I cried like a baby" because "I was the first girl in history from the Czech Republic to win the title as Pet of the Year and the second girl from Europe".

== Personal life ==
Podkapová was born in Brno, Czechoslovakia (now Czech Republic).

1970s	Evelyn Treacher	Stephanie McLean	Tina McDowall	Patricia Barrett	Avril Lund
1970s	Anneka Di Lorenzo	Laura Bennett Doone	Victoria Lynn Johnson	Dominique Maure	Cheryl Rixon
1980s	Isabella Ardigo	Danielle Deneux	Corinne Alphen	Sheila Kennedy	Linda Kenton
1980s	None	Cody Carmack	Mindy Farrar	Patty Mullen	Ginger Miller
1990s	Stephanie Page	Simone Brigitte	Jisel	Julie Strain	Sasha Vinni
1990s	Gina LaMarca	Andi Sue Irwin	Elizabeth Ann Hilden	Paige Summers	Nikie St. Gilles
2000s	Juliet Cariaga	Zdeňka Podkapová	Megan Mason	Sunny Leone	Victoria Zdrok
2000s	Martina Warren	Jamie Lynn	Heather Vandeven	Erica Ellyson	Taya Parker
2010s	Taylor Vixen	Nikki Benz	Jenna Rose	Nicole Aniston	Lexi Belle
2010s	Layla Sin	Kenna James	Jenna Sativa	Gina Valentina	Gianna Dior
2020s	Lacy Lennon	Kenzie Anne	Amber Marie	Tahlia Paris	Renee Olstead
2020s	Kassie Wallis	-	-	-	-
