= Brno Conservatory =

Music school in the Czech Republic

- Konzervatoř Brno

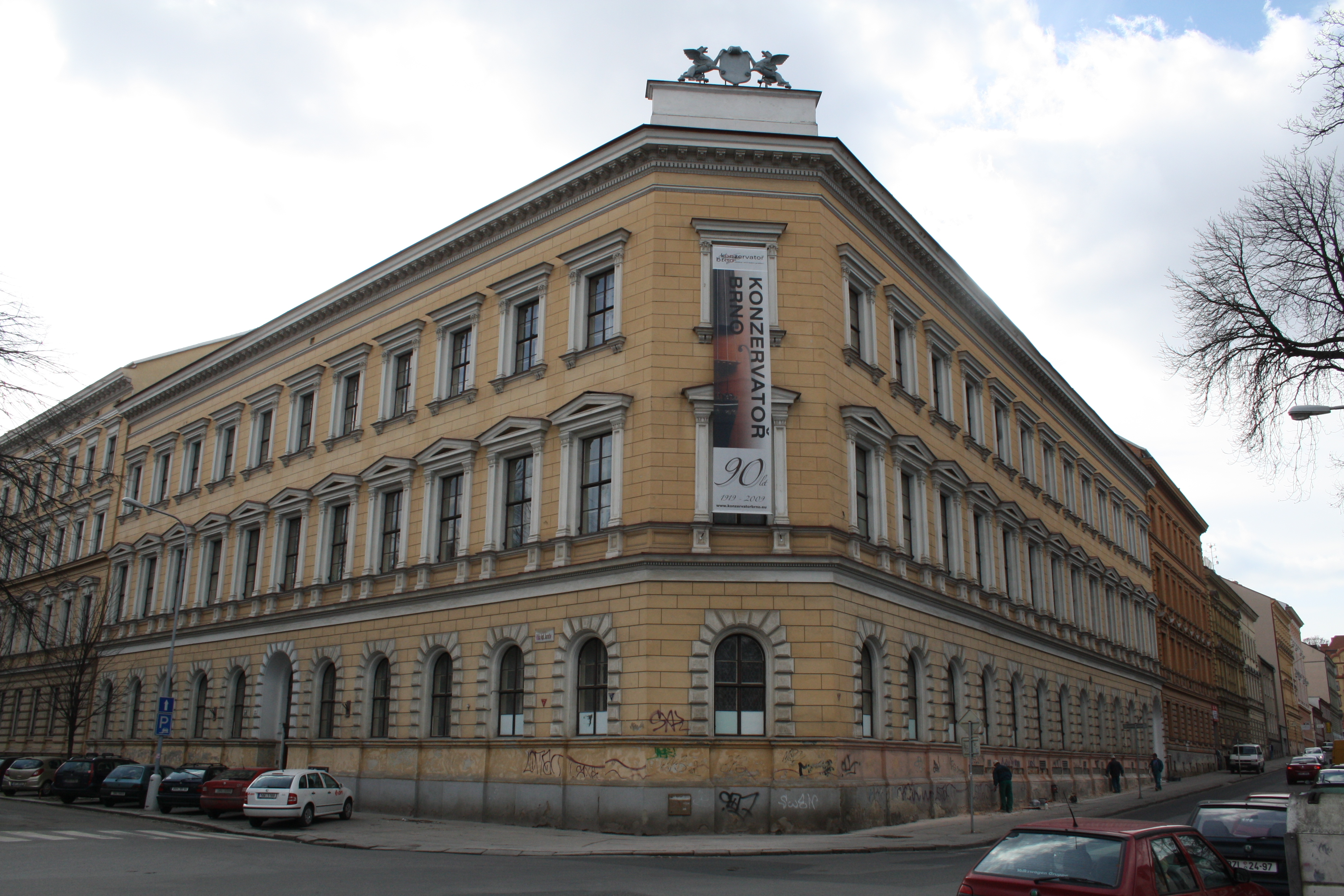

Location
- Brno; Czech Republic
- Coordinates: 49°12′15.94″N 16°36′36.15″E

Information
- Type: Music school
- Established: 25 September 1919
- Gender: Coeducational
- Language: Czech
- Website: konzervatorbrno.eu

The Brno Conservatory, also Brno Conservatoire (Czech: Konzervatoř Brno), was established in Brno on 25 September 1919 by Moravian composer Leoš Janáček.

== History ==
Leoš Janáček attempted to establish and improve high musical education in Brno from his early age. In 1881, he founded the Organ School, however, it was just the beginning of his efforts in this field. The conservatory was established by joining the Organ School, music school of Beseda brněnská, and music school of Vesna (women's educational association based in Brno). Initially, it was situated in a "greek villa", on the corner of the streets of Smetanova and Kounicova. It was the former seat of the Organ School (from 1907). Janáček was the first director of the conservatory, but the school gained its current seat only during the directorship of his successor, Jan Kunc. The building of the conservatory was designed in 1899 in the style of Neo-Renaissance by German Wanderley. It was the seat of the German Teachers Institute, founded by the Emperor Franz Joseph I of Austria. The commemorate plaque at the building reads: „Kaiser Franz Josef I. widmete dieses Haus der Bildung von Volksschullehrern 1872." ("The Emperor Franz Josef I dedicated this house to build the public teaching 1872").

During the period of German occupation of Czechoslovakia, the school became an important centre of Czech and Moravian cultural tradition.

Jan Kunc remained the director until 1945. Other important directors include pianist and musicologist Ludvík Kundera and music theorist and composer Zdeněk Blažek.

From 1919 to 1928, Brno Conservatory had two masterclasses intended for composers and pianists. The official status of the school was lower than university level, however, the quality of the courses was reasonably good.

The dance department was a part of the conservatory from 1946. The department was separated and became independent in 1986.

As of 2011, Brno Conservatory has classes for all instruments of the standard symphony orchestra. Additionally, the school provides teaching of guitar, accordion, cimbalom, recorder, composition, conducting and singing.

Brno Conservatory regularly organizes concerts and theatre performances and collaborates with the Brno Philharmonic Orchestra.

== Faculty (past and present) ==
- Josef Blatný, composition
- Jan Kunc, composition
- Ludvík Kundera, piano
- Vilém Kurz, piano
- Jaroslav Kvapil, composition
- Vilém Petrželka, composition
- Jan Škrdlík, cello

== Alumni ==
- Igor Ardašev, pianist
- Břetislav Bakala, conductor, pianist, composer
- Aleš Bárta, organist
- Josef Berg, composer
- Libuše Domanínská, soprano
- Rudolf Firkušný, pianist
- Michaela Fukačová, cellist
- Pavel Haas, composer
- Josef Horák, bass clarinetist
- František Jílek, conductor
- Vítězslava Kaprálová, composer, conductor
- Ctirad Kohoutek, composer
- Vlastimil Lejsek, composer, pianist
- Zdeněk Mácal, conductor
- Jan Novák, composer
- Ludvík Podéšť, composer
- Theodor Schaefer, composer
- Yngve Sköld, composer, pianist
- František Šolc, hornist
- Stanislav Vavřínek, flautist, conductor
- Jiří Halíř, teacher, famous gastronome
