= Ludvík Kundera =

Czech writer

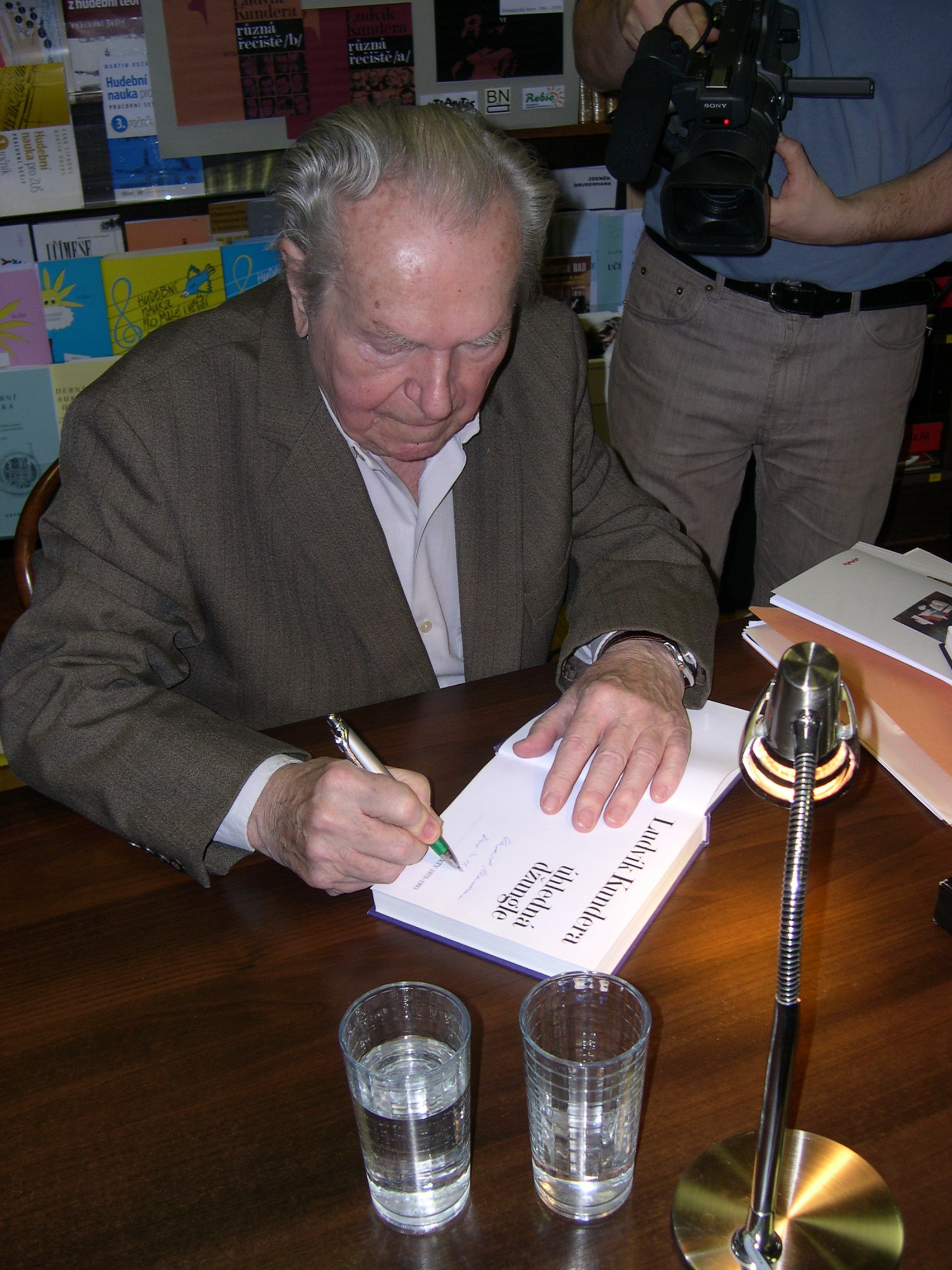
- Kundera in 2009
- Born: 22 March 1920; Brno, Czechoslovakia
- Died: 17 August 2010 (aged 90); Boskovice, Czech Republic
- Relatives: Ludvík Kundera (uncle); Milan Kundera (cousin)
- Writing career
- Notable awards: Medal of Merit (2007); Jaroslav Seifert Award (2009)

Ludvík Kundera (22 March 1920 – 17 August 2010) was a Czech writer, translator, poet, playwright, editor and literary historian. He was a notable exponent of Czech avant-garde literature and a prolific translator of German authors. In 2007, he received the Medal of Merit for service to the Republic. In 2009, he was awarded the Jaroslav Seifert Award, presented by the Charter 77 Foundation. Kundera was a cousin of Czech-French writer Milan Kundera and nephew of the pianist and musicologist also named Ludvík Kundera.

== Biography ==
Kundera was born in Brno, Czechoslovakia He studied at the Faculty of Arts of Charles University in Prague and later continued his studies at Masaryk University in Brno. During World War II, he was abducted to a forced labour in Germany. After the war, he worked as an editor in several newspapers and magazines, including Blok, Rovnost and Host do domu. In 1945, he co-founded the surrealist group Skupina RA (Group RA). His first book of poetry, Konstantina, was published in 1946. That same year he befriended the poet František Halas, whom he considered his teacher and mentor. From the mid-1950s he concentrated solely on writing and translating. From 1968 to 1970 he worked as a dramaturgist in the Mahen Theatre, a part of the National Theatre in Brno. Additionally, he collaborated with the National Theatre as a playwright. In 2005, Mahen Theatre premiered his play about the Czech composer Leoš Janáček.

During the period of normalization (in the 1970s and '80s) Kundera was banned from being published. He left the Mahen Theatre in reaction to the dismissal of his collaborators who openly expressed disagreement with the political transformation in Czechoslovakia after the Prague Spring. Because of that, he was labeled undesirable by the communist regime. In 1970 he was expelled from the Communist Party and gradually lost the possibility to continue his cultural activities in Czechoslovakia. To continue his work, he was forced to use pseudonyms. From the 1970s he was an initiator and coordinator of samizdat publishing activities in Czechoslovakia. He focused mainly on translations of German authors, such as Heinrich Böll, Berthold Brecht and Hans Arp. Additionally, he translated important expressionist and dadaist works. A significant part of his work was devoted to the literature of German Romanticism.

Kundera spent a large part of his life in the Moravian town of Kunštát. He died in Boskovice.

== Work ==
- Konstantina, 1946
- Živly v nás, 1946
- Napospas aneb Přísloví pro kočku, 1947
- Letní kniha přání a stížností, 1962
- Totální kuropění, 1962
- Tolik cejchů, 1966
- Fragment, 1967
- Nežert, 1967
- Odjezd, 1967
- Labyrint světa a lusthauz srdce, 1983
- Dada (Jazzpetit č. 13), 1983
- Chameleon, 1984
- Hruden, 1985
- Královna Dagmar, 1988
- Ptaní, 1990
- Napříč Fantomázií, 1991
- Malé radosti, 1991
- Ztráty a nálezy, 1991
- Pády, 1992
- Spád věcí a jiné básně, 1992
- Řečiště, 1993

=== Translations ===
- Nobi, Ludwig Renn, Prague, Státní nakladatelství dětské knihy 1957.
- Země snivců (Die andere Seite) Alfred Kubin; R, Nakladatelství mladých, Kladno 1947
- Proměna (Die Fahrt nach Stalingrad) Franz Fühmann, Prague, Naše vojsko 1957.
- Trini, Ludwig Renn, Prague, Mladá fronta 1957.
- Mrtví nestárnou, (Die Toten bleiben jung), Anna Seghers, Prague, SNKLHU 1957.
- Nox et solitudo (Nox et solitudo), Ivan Krasko, Prague, SNKLHU 1958.
- Píseň o lásce a smrti korneta Kryštofa Rilka, Rainer Maria Rilke, Prague, Naše vojsko 1958.
- Myšlenky (selection), Bertolt Brecht Prague, Československý spisovatel 1958.
- Dvanáct nocí, Peter Huchel, Prague, Mladá fronta 1958.
- Sto básní. Výbor z lyriky, Bertolt Brecht, Prague, SNKLHU 1959.
- Lukulův výslech, (Das Verhör des Lukullus), Bertolt Brecht, Divadelní hry 2, Prague, SNKLHU 1959.
- Raubíři (Die Räuberbande), Leonhard Frank (Raubíři, Ochsenfurtské kvarteto, Prague, SNKLHU 1959; Raubíři, Ochsenfurtské kvarteto, Dvanáct spravedlivých, Prague, Odeon 1983)
- Kulatolebí a špičatolebí, (Die Rundköpfe und die Spitzköpfe), Bertolt Brecht, Divadelní hry 2, Prague, SNKLHU 1959.
- Horáti a Kuriáti (Die Horatier und die Kuriatier), Bertolt Brecht, Divadelní hry 2, Prague, SNKLHU 1959.
- Kdes byl, Adame? (Wo warst du, Adam?), Heinrich Böll, Prague, Naše vojsko 1961.
- Pohraniční stanice (Kameraden), Franz Fühmann, Prague, Naše vojsko 1961.
- Domácí postila Bertolta Brechta (Bertolt Brechts Hauspostille), Bertolt Brecht, Prague, Mladá fronta 1963.
- Vojcek (Woyzeck), Georg Büchner, Praha, Dilia 1963; (Dílo G. Büchnera, Prague, Odeon 1987).
- Silnice silnice (Chausseen, Chausseen), Peter Huchel, Prague, SNKLU 1964; 3. edition: Prague, Mladá fronta 1997.
- Otevřená okna (Otvorené okná), Laco Novomeský, Prague, Československý spisovatel 1964.
- Básně Georg Trakl, Prague, SNKLU 1965.
- Poémy, Laco Novomeský, Prague, Mladá fronta 1965.
- Pronásledování a zavraždění Jeana Paula Marata předvedené divadelním souborem blázince v Charentonu za řízení markýze de Sade (Die Verfolgung und Ermordung Jean Marats dargestellt durch die Schauspielergruppe des Hospizes zu Charenton unter Anleitung des Herrn de Sade) Peter Weiss, Prague, Orbis 1965; 2nd edition Větrné mlýny, Brno, Host 2000.
- Experiment Damokles (Experiment Damokles), Peter Karvaš, Prague, Dilia 1967.
- Haló, je tady vichr - vichřice!. Antologie německého expresionismu, Prague, Československý spisovatel 1969.
- Songy, Chóry, Básně, Bertolt Brecht, Prague, Československý spisovatel 1978.
- Básně, Bertolt Brecht, Prague, Odeon 1979.
- Čítanka slovenské literatury, Prague, Albatros 1982.
- Společná přítomnost (Commune présence), René Char, Prague, Odeon 1985.
- Alžběta Anglická (Elisabeth von England, Ferdinand Bruckner, Prague, Dilia 1986.
- Na jedné noze, Hans Arp, Prague, Odeon, 1987.
- Leonce a Lena (Leonce und Lena), Georg Büchner, Prague, Dilia 1984; (works of G. Büchner, Prague, Odeon 1987)
- Don Carlos Friedrich Schiller, Prague, Dilia 1987.
- Básně, Gottfried Benn, Prague, Erm 1995.
- Šebestián ve snu, Georg Trakl, Třebíč, Arca JiMfa 1998.
- UMBRA VITAE, Georg Heym, Zblov, Nakladatelství Opus 1999.
- Palmström, Christian Morgenstern, Prague, Vyšehrad 2001).
