= Vilém Petrželka =

Czech composer and conductor (1889–1967)

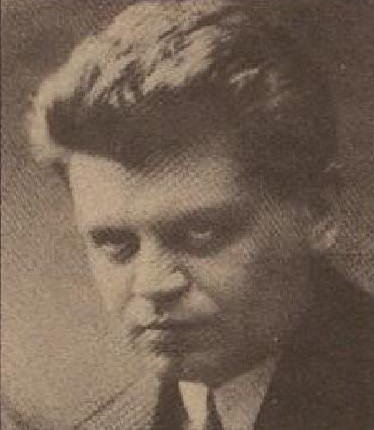
Petrželka in 1931

Vilém Petrželka (10 September 1889, Brno – 10 January 1967, Brno) was a Czech composer and conductor.

Petrželka was a pupil of Leoš Janáček, Vítězslav Novák and Karel Hoffmeister. From 1914 he taught composition at the Janáček Academy of Music and Performing Arts and the School of the Philharmonic Society in Brno.

== Selected works ==
Orchestra

- Pochod bohémů (March of the Bohemians) (1919)
- Věčný návrat, Symphony in 3 Parts, Op.13 (1922–1923)
- Dramatická ouvertura (Preludio drammatico), Op.26 (1932)
- Partita for string orchestra, Op.31 (1934)
- Moravský tanec (Moravian Dance)
- Pastorální symfonietta, Op.51
- Symphony, Op.56 (1955–1956)

Concertante

- Concerto for violin and orchestra, Op.40

Chamber music

- String Quartet in B♭ major, Op.2
- String Quartet in C minor, Op.6
- Zimní nálada (Winter Mood) for violin and piano (1907)
- Z intimních chvil (From Intimate Moments), 3 Pieces for violin and piano, Op.9 (1918)
- Fantasie for string quartet, Op.19 (1927)
- Sonata for cello solo, Op.23 (1930)
- Sonata for violin and piano, Op.29 (1933)
- Piano Trio, Op.32 (1937)
- 4 Impromptus for violin and piano, Op.36 (1940)
- Divertimento for woodwind quintet, Op.39 (1941)
- Serenáda for flute, oboe, clarinet, horn, bassoon, violin, viola, cello and double bass (1945)
- String Quartet No.5, Op.43 (1947)
- Dvě skladby (2 Pieces) for cello (or viola) and piano, Op.45 (1947)
- Miniatury for woodwind quintet (1953)
- Sonatina for violin and piano (1953)
- Suite for string quartet

Piano

- Andante cantabile
- Drobné klavírní skladby
- Svatební suita (Wedding Suite) (1912)
- Písně poezie i prozy (Songs in Verse and Prose), Op.8 (1917)
- Suite for piano, Op.22 (1943)
- Pět prostých skladeb, Op.47
- Pět nálad (5 Moods), Op.55 (1954)

Vocal

- Živly (Elements), Song Cycle for baritone and orchestra, Op.7 (1917)
- Samoty duše (Solitude of the Heart; Einsamkeiten der Seele), 4 Songs for voice and piano, Op.10 (1919)
- Cesta (The Path; Der Weg), Song Cycle for tenor and chamber orchestra, Op.14 (1924)
- Dvojí noc – Odpočinutí for voice and piano, Op.25
- Přírodní snímky (Natural Images), Song Cycle for voice and piano, Op.30 (1933)
- Písně milostné (Love Songs) for voice and piano, Op.35 (1943); words by Bábá Táhir Urján
- Písně v lidovém tónu (Songs in Folk Tone) for voice and piano
- Štafeta for voice and string quartet

Choral

- Jitřní píseň (Morning Song) for male chorus and piano
- Námořník Mikuláš, Oratorio (Symphonic Drama) for soloists, narrator, mixed chorus, orchestra, jazz orchestra and organ
- Slováckou pěšinou, Folk Songs for male chorus, Op.12 (1921)
- To je má zem for male chorus, Op.37; words by Jaroslav Zatloukal
