= Jan Kunc =

Czech composer, teacher, and writer

Jan Kunc (27 March 1883, Doubravice nad Svitavou – 11 September 1976, Brno) was a Czech composer, teacher, and writer.

From 1898 to 1902 Kunc attended the teachers' college in Brno, as well as the Organ School (1901–3) where his teacher was the composer Leoš Janáček. He studied composition with Vítězslav Novák at the Prague Conservatory from 1905 to 1906. From 1919 until 1945, he was a professor at the Brno Conservatory, becoming director of that institution in 1923.

Kunc composed music for piano, chamber music, mixed choir, and solo vocal, as well as symphonic poems. In 1933 he composed a new setting of the traditional chant Christus vincit, Christus regnat, Christus imperat which became the interval signal for Vatican Radio, and in 1935 he created the official arrangement of the Czech national anthem.

== Selected works ==
Chamber:

- Sonata in C Minor for Piano, Op. 1 (1903, rev. 1909–1910)
- Piano Trio in F Minor, Op. 3 (1904)
- String Quartet in G Major, Op. 9 (1909)
- Four Piano Pieces, Op. 13 (1906–1927)
- Miniatures for Piano, Op. 19 (1923)
- Sonata for Violin and Piano Op. 22 (1925)
- Czech Dances for Piano, Op. 34 (1947)
- Miniatures for Piano, Op. 38 (1956–1959)
- Miniatures for Wind Quintet, Op. 39 (1958)

Orchestral:

- Song of Youth. Symphonic Poem for Large Orchestra, Op. 12 (1916)

Vocal:

- Four Songs Op. 5 (1907-8)
