= Leoš Svárovský =

Czech flautist and conductor (born 1961)

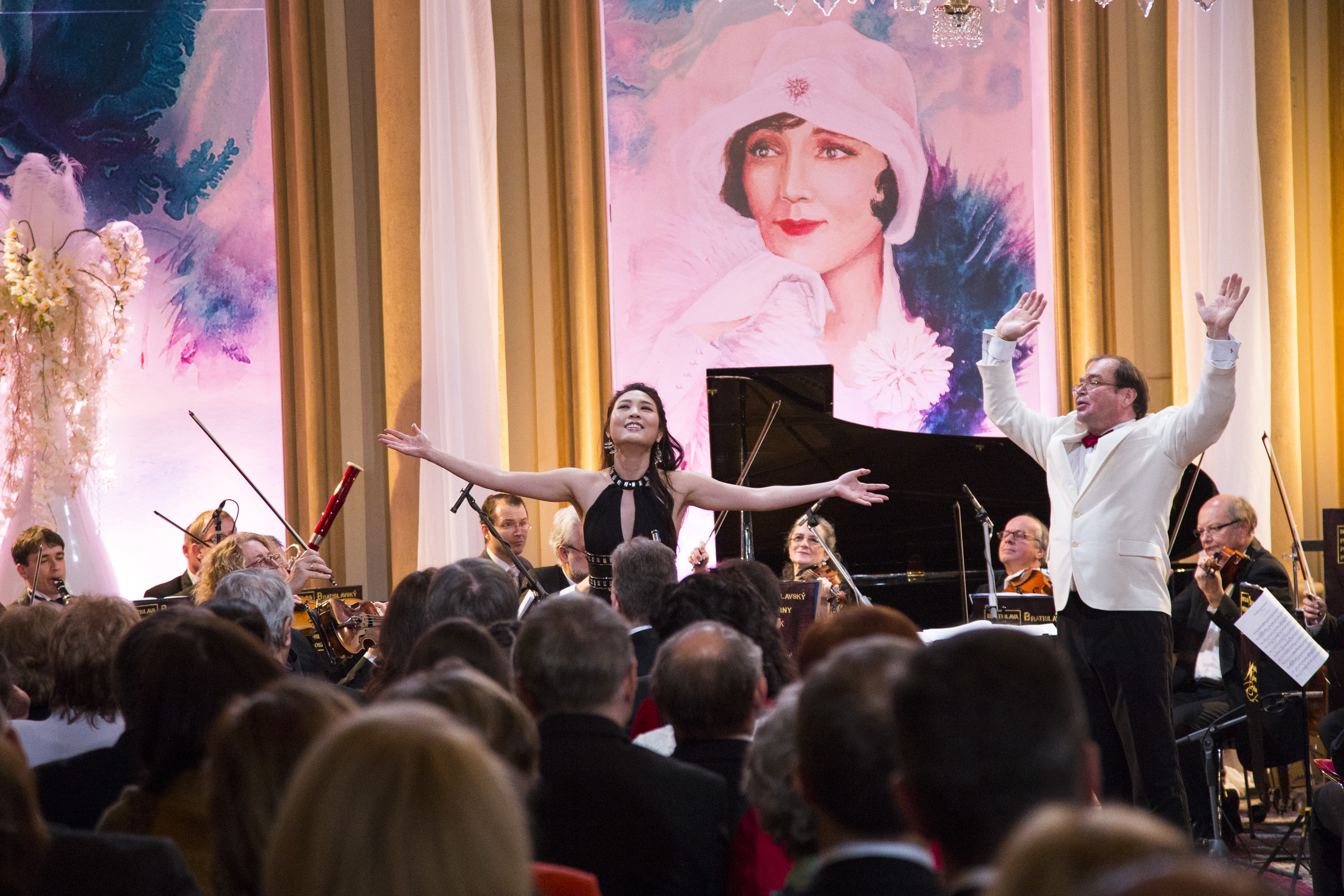

Leoš Svárovský (born 17 May 1961 in Jablonec nad Nisou, former Czechoslovakia) is a Czech flautist and conductor.

He began his musical career as a flautist after studying at the Prague Conservatory. By 1981 he was a renowned soloist. He studied until 1987 at the Czech Academy of Music and Dramatic Art, starting his conducting career in 1985.

Preceded by Petr Vronský	Principal Conductors, Brno Philharmonic Orchestra; 1991–1995	Succeeded by Aldo Ceccato
