= Janáček Academy of Performing Arts =

Performing arts school in Brno, Czech Republic

Janáček Academy of Performing Arts Janáčkova akademie múzických umění v Brně

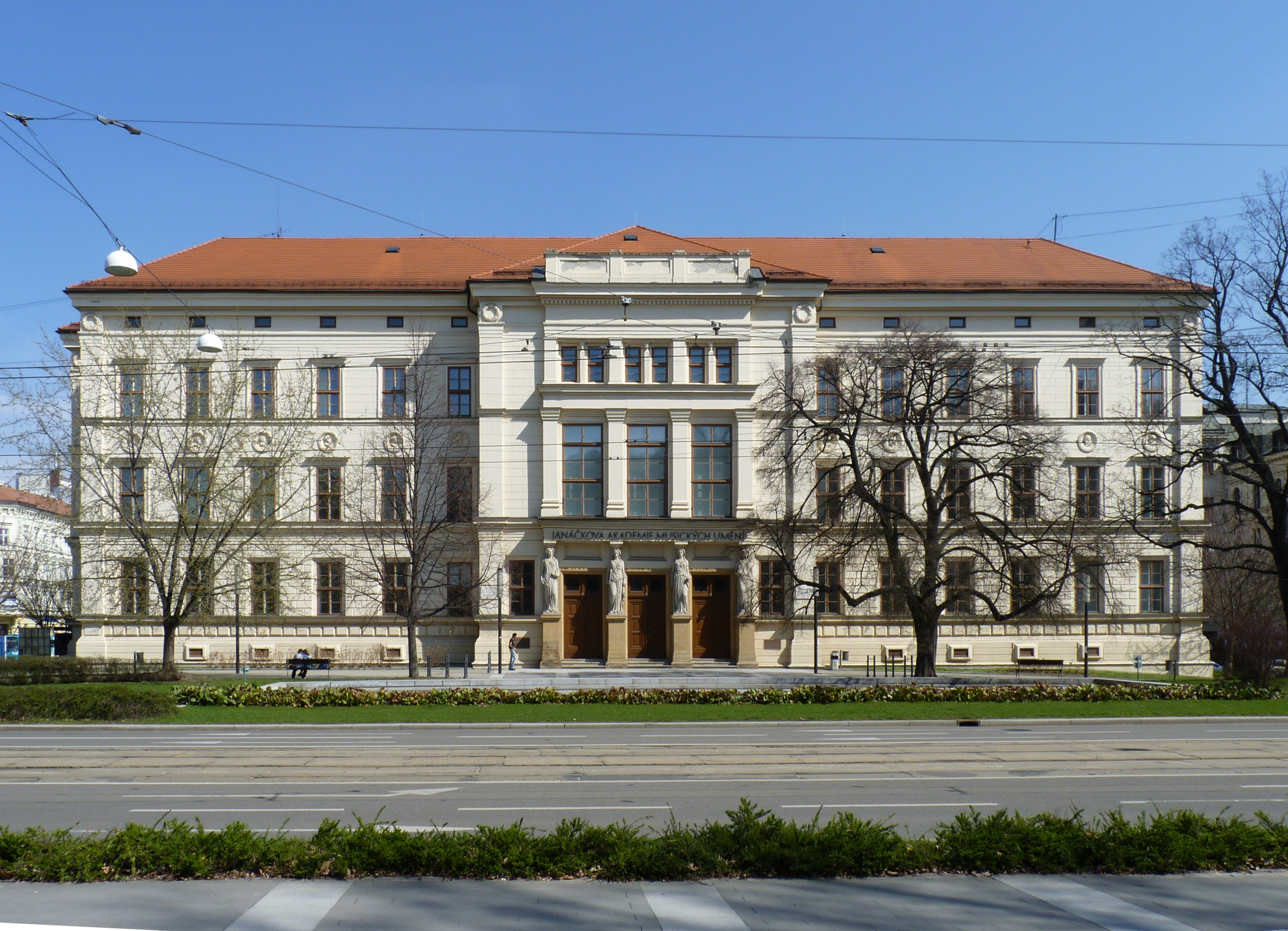
- JAMU Faculty of Music building

Location
- Brno; Czech Republic
- Coordinates: 49°11′46.16″N 16°36′37.38″E

Information
- Type: Performing arts
- Established: 12 September 1947
- Language: Czech
- Website: jamu.cz

The Janáček Academy of Performing Arts (Czech: Janáčkova akademie múzických umění v Brně; abbreviation in Czech: JAMU) is a public university with an artistic focus in Brno, Czech Republic. It was established in 1947 and consists of two faculties: the Faculty of Music and the Faculty of Theater.

== Background ==
The Janáček Academy of Performing Arts was established on 12 September 1947 and is named after classical composer Leoš Janáček. Following the collapse of the Czech communist government in 1989, music and theatre faculties were re-established, a number of professors who had been unable to teach were brought back, young teachers were admitted to the staff, new fields of study were introduced, and foreign contacts were initiated. The institution soon gained wide recognition.

Honorary doctorates have been awarded to pianist Rudolf Firkušný (a native of Brno), poet Ludvík Kundera, playwright Václav Havel, and poet and actor Jiří Suchý. JAMU has more than 500 students at its two faculties.

The academy organises the annual Leoš Janáček Competition. The work of students at the Faculty of Music is presented to the public in the Chamber Opera, as well as through a series of public concerts continuing throughout the academic year.
