= Op. 111 =

In music, Op. 111 stands for Opus number 111. Compositions that are assigned this number include:

- Beethoven – Piano Sonata No. 32
- Brahms – String Quintet No. 2
- Dvořák – A Hero's Song
- Fauré – Fantaisie
- Prokofiev – Symphony No. 6
- Shostakovich – Novorossiysk Chimes

Op. 111 may also refer to:

- Dix pièces by Jean Absil; see List of compositions for guitar#1960s
- Piano Sonata No. 7 in E-flat major; see List of compositions by Isaac Albéniz#Works with opus numbers
- Flute Concerto No. 2, see List of compositions by Malcolm Arnold#Concerto
- Foxfire Overture for Symphonic Band, see James Barnes (composer)#Works for concert band
- From Olden Times, see List of compositions by Amy Beach#Keyboard
- "Impromptu". by Paul Bernard
- Suite; see List of compositions by York Bowen#Piano 4-hands
- Pot Pourri; see List of compositions by Ferdinando Carulli#Works With Opus Numbers
- Souvenirs Lointains, see List of compositions by Cécile Chaminade#Works with opus number
- Suite for saxophone quartet, see Paul Creston#Chamber music
- Zwei Romanzen für Klavier zu drei Händen, see List of compositions by Carl Czerny#By opus number
- Ariel for violin and piano; see František Drdla#Violin and piano
- 4 Klavierstücke, see Robert Fuchs (composer)#Solo
- Piano Suite in E, see Jack Gibbons#Solo piano
- Morceaux de Ballet, see Stephen Heller#Works
- Grande fantaisie sur la Romanesca, fameux air de danse du XVIe siècle, see List of compositions by Henri Herz#Piano Solo
- Symphonietta in D major for wind and brass, The Sleeper; see List of compositions by Joseph Holbrooke#Other
- Pastorale No. 1; see List of compositions by Alan Hovhaness
- Mass No. 3 for Soloists, Chorus, and Orchestra in D major, see List of compositions by Johann Nepomuk Hummel#By opus numbers
- "Gingerbread Man", see List of compositions by Nikolai Kapustin
- What Price Confidence?, a 1944 opera by Ernst Krenek
- Lieder aus alter Zeit, see Theodor Kullak#Piano Solo
- La Chasse, see List of compositions by Henry Litolff#Piano solo
- Fantasia apocaliptica, see Erkki Melartin#Piano
- Sinfonia da requiem, see Krzysztof Meyer#Works for orchestra
- 4 Grandes Etudes de Concert, see List of compositions by Ignaz Moscheles#Works with Opus Number
- Te Deum for soprano, bass, mixed choir and orchestra, see Pehr Henrik Nordgren#Choral
- Ballade, see Dianne Goolkasian Rahbee#Piano
- Organ Sonata No. 5 in F-sharp Minor by Josef Rheinberger (unofficial numbering); see 1878 in music
- Das Lied von der Glocke by Andreas Romberg, see Song of the Bell#Recitations and musical settings
- 3 Fantasiestücke by Robert Schumann
- Intrada, Op. 111a or Surusoitto, Op. 111b; see List of compositions by Jean Sibelius#Organ
- 3 Part-Songs, for SATB; see List of compositions by Charles Villiers Stanford#Miscellaneous
- Indianer-Galopp; see Johann Strauss I#Galops and polkas
- Blumenfest; see List of compositions by Johann Strauss II#Polkas
- Divertimento Piccolo, see José Carlos Amaral Vieira#List of compositions
- Pozdravlyayem!, a 1975 opera by Mieczysław Weinberg

== See also ==
- Opus 111, an imprint of Naïve Records
