= Fantasy for piano and orchestra =

Fantasy for piano and orchestra may refer to:

- Fantasy (Phantasie) for piano and orchestra (1841), adapted and became the first movement of the Piano Concerto by Robert Schumann
- Concert Fantasia (Tchaikovsky) (1884)
- Fantaisie for piano and orchestra (Debussy) (1890)
- Fantaisie for piano and orchestra (Fauré) (1918)
