= Fantaisie for piano and orchestra (Debussy) =

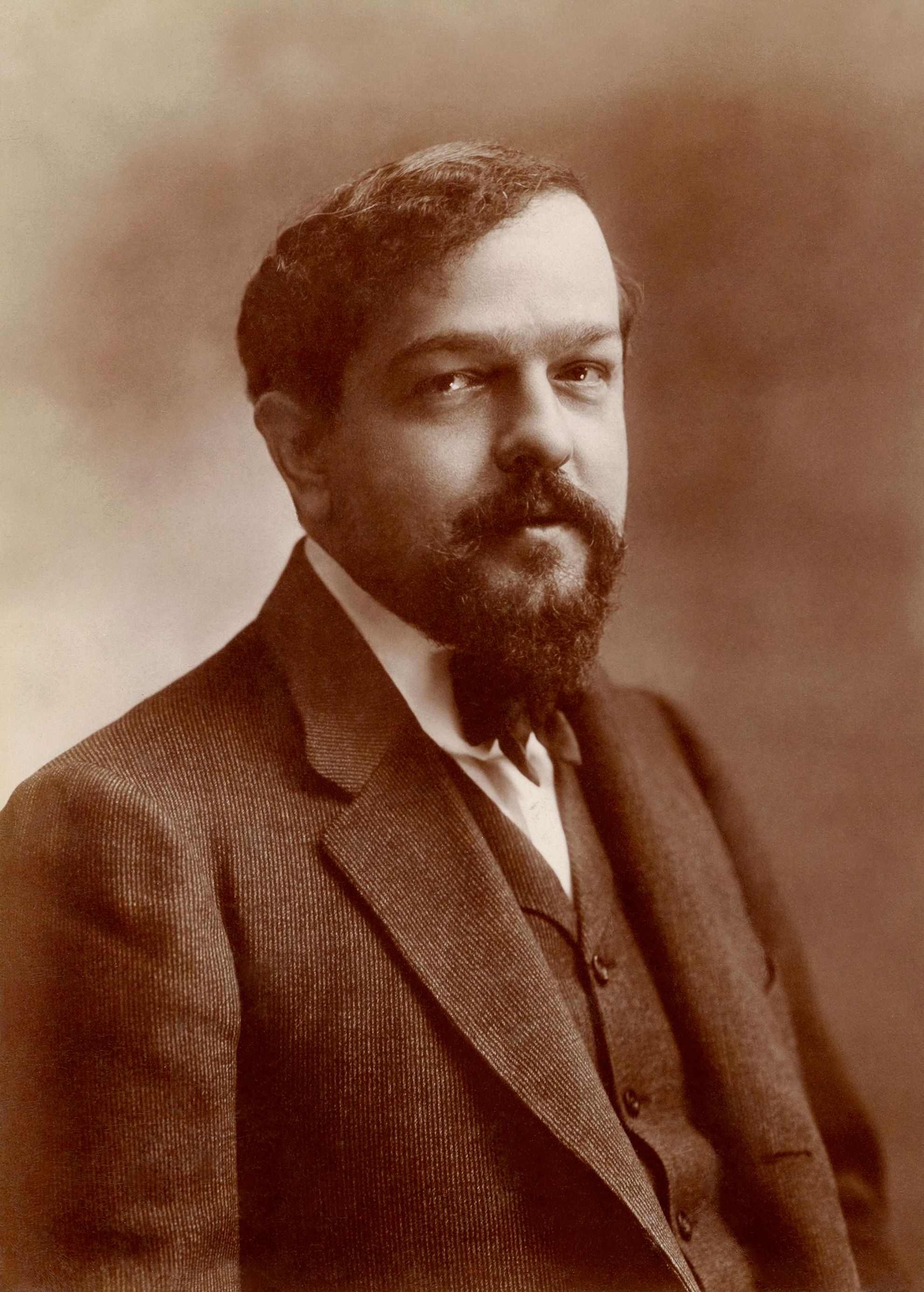
Debussy c. 1900 by Atelier Nadar

Fantaisie for piano and orchestra (L.73/CD.72), is a composition for piano and orchestra by French composer Claude Debussy. It was composed between October 1889 and April 1890, but only received its first public performance in 1919, a year after Debussy's death. The work is dedicated to the pianist René Chansarel, who had been scheduled to play the solo part for the cancelled premiere in 1890.

== Instrumentation ==
The Fantaisie is scored for:

piano solo;
3 flutes, 2 oboes, cor anglais (English horn), 2 (soprano) clarinets in B♭, 3 bassoons, bass clarinet in B♭;
4 (French) (valve) horns in F, 3 trumpets in F;
2 harps;
strings (1st & 2nd violins, violas, cellos, double basses).

== Structure ==
The Fantaisie is in three movements, as in a traditional concerto, with the first movement in sonata form, a slow, calm middle movement, and an energetic finale. This despite the title, a fantasia is traditionally in a single movement with several sections of vastly different character, and contains no "sonata form". The title Fantaisie was given to this work because it is in cyclic form: it uses the same two themes in all three movements.

1. Andante ma non troppo (G major)
2. Lento e molto espressivo (F♯ major)
3. Allegro molto (G major)

A typical performance lasts approximately 25 minutes.

== Performance and publication ==
The first public performance of the work, scheduled in 1890, was cancelled when Vincent d'Indy, who was chosen as conductor, claimed that he did not have enough time for rehearsals and proposed to perform only the first movement, which Debussy declined. Over the next few years the very self-critical Debussy made numerous revisions, but eventually gave up on the work and declared that the Fantaisie would never be published or performed during his lifetime. It received its first public performance posthumously on November 20, 1919, in London by the Royal Philharmonic Orchestra with Alfred Cortot as soloist. It was published first in a two-piano version (2nd piano is a reduction of the orchestra score) made by Gustave Samazeuilh in 1919, with the full score in 1920, both by Eugène Fromont, one of Debussy's early publishers.

== Recordings ==
- Debussy: Fantasy for Piano and Orchestra, Poulenc: Aubade - Fabienne Jacquinot; Westminster Symphony Orchestra conducted by Anatole Fistoulari. Parlophone PMC 1019
- Debussy: Fantaisie, Violin Sonata, Cello Sonata, La Mer - Claude Debussy; Martha Argerich; Staatskapelle Berlin; Daniel Barenboim. Release Date: 2021. Label: Deutsche Grammophon.
- Ravel – Debussy – Bizet – Prague Philharmonia; Andrew von Oeyen (pianist); Emmanuel Villaume (conductor). Release date: 2018. Label: Warner Classics.
- Debussy, Poulenc, Ravel, Francaix: Piano Concertos – Deutsche Radio Philharmonie Saarbrücken Kaiserslautern; Florian Uhlig (pianist); Pablo González (conductor). Release date: 2013. Label: Hänssler Classic.
- Debussy: Complete Orchestral Works, Vol. 7 – Orchestre National de Lyon; Jean-Yves Thibaudet (pianist); Jun Märkl (conductor). Release date: 2011. Label: Naxos.
- Ravel – Franck – Debussy – South Jutland Symphony Orchestra; Oleg Marshev (pianist); Vladimir Ziva (conductor). Release date: 2009. Label: Danacord.

== See also ==
- Fantaisie for piano and orchestra (Fauré)
