= Fantaisie =

Fantaisie may refer to:

- Fantasia (musical form)
- Fantaisie, Op. 79 for flute and piano (1898) by Gabriel Fauré
- Fantaisie, Op. 111 for piano and orchestra (1918) by Gabriel Fauré
