= Andrew von Oeyen =

American pianist

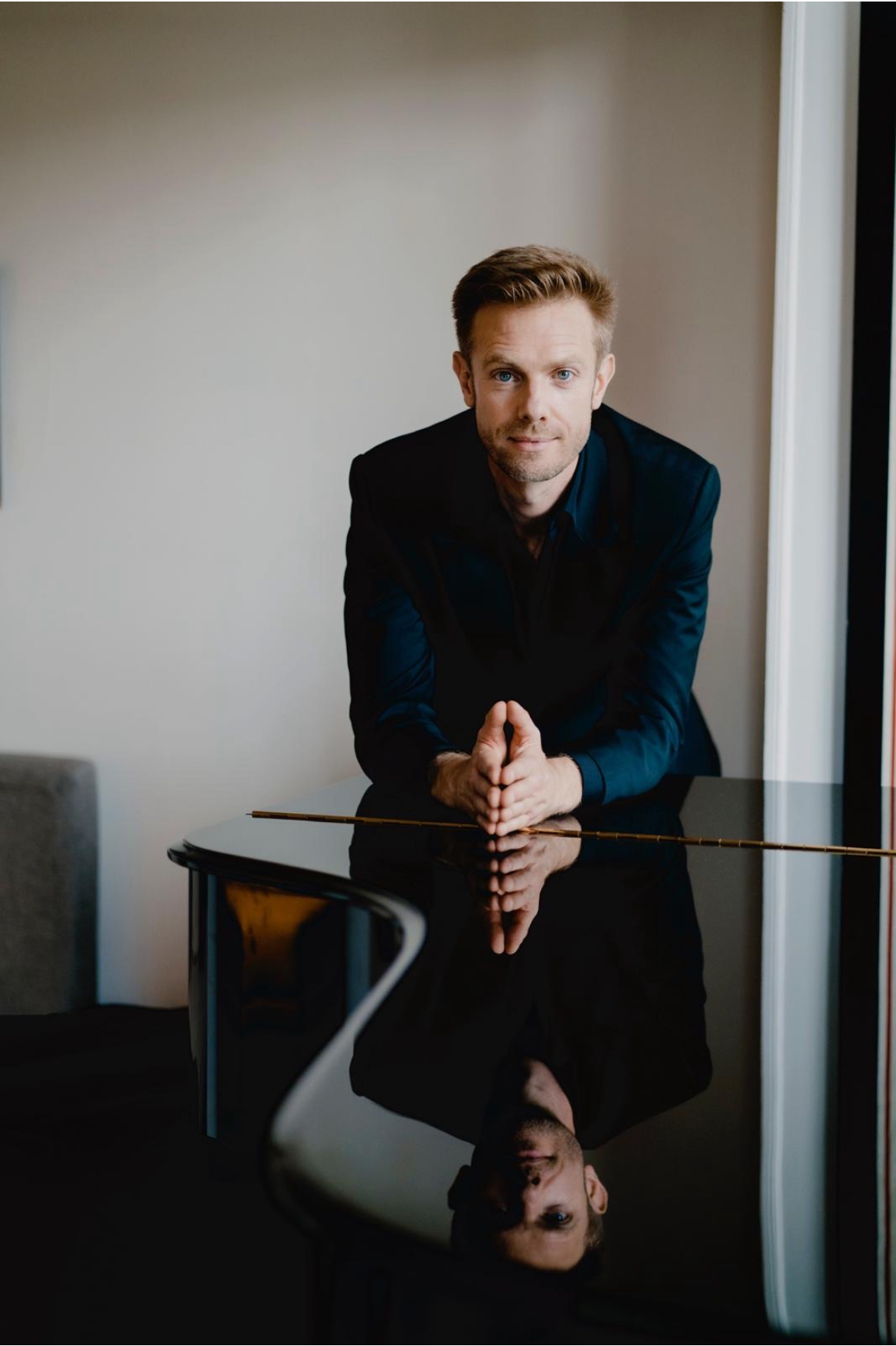

Andrew von Oeyen (born November 12, 1979) is a concert pianist. He is a citizen of the United States and France.

== Life and career ==
Von Oeyen began piano lessons at age five in Los Angeles and made his solo orchestral debut at age ten. At age 16, he made his debut with Esa-Pekka Salonen and the Los Angeles Philharmonic. He studied at the Juilliard School and Columbia University and won the Gilmore Young Artist Award (1999), and First Prize in the Léni Fé Bland Foundation National Piano Competition (2001).

He has performed extensively in recital and in orchestral appearances around the world, appearing as soloist with the Los Angeles Philharmonic, Philadelphia Orchestra, San Francisco Symphony, Detroit Symphony, Dallas Symphony, Cincinnati Symphony, Saint Louis Symphony, Atlanta Symphony, Seattle Symphony, Singapore Symphony Orchestra, Utah Symphony, Chicago's Grant Park Festival Orchestra, Pacific Symphony, San Diego Symphony, Vancouver Symphony, Mariinsky Orchestra, Berlin Symphony Orchestra, BBC Symphony Orchestra, Tokyo Metropolitan Symphony Orchestra, New Japan Philharmonic, Prague Philharmonia, Bilbao Symphony, Biel Solothurn Symphony Orchestra, Jerusalem Symphony, Slovenian Philharmonic, and Slovak Philharmonic, among others. On July 4, 2009, von Oeyen performed at the U.S. Capitol with the National Symphony Orchestra in "A Capitol Fourth." The concert was broadcast live by PBS both in the US and internationally.

Von Oeyen has appeared in recital at Wigmore Hall and Barbican Hall in London, Lincoln Center in New York, the Kennedy Center in Washington, Symphony Hall, Boston, Tonhalle Orchester Zürich, Tchaikovsky Hall in Moscow, Bolshoi Zal in St. Petersburg, Royal Opera of Versailles, Dublin's National Concert Hall, Royce Hall in Los Angeles, the Herbst Theatre in San Francisco, Sala São Paulo, Teatro Olimpico in Rome, Romanian Athenaeum in Bucharest, Hong Kong Cultural Centre, Hanoi Opera House in Vietnam, and in all the major concert halls of Japan and South Korea. He regularly appears at festivals including Aspen Music Festival and School, Ravinia Festival, Saratoga Performing Arts Center, Mainly Mozart Festival, Grand Teton Music Festival, Grant Park Music Festival, Spoleto Festival USA, Gilmore, Brevard Music Center, Chautauqua Institution, Festival del Sole (Napa Valley), Schubertiade (Austria) and White Nights Festival (Mariinsky). He has also toured extensively with violinist Sarah Chang throughout Europe, the United States and Asia.

Von Oeyen has appeared twice at the Royal Opera House Muscat for the Sultan of Oman's New Year's Gala concerts and made his debut at the Sheikh Jaber Al-Ahmad Cultural Centre in Kuwait in 2019.

Andrew von Oeyen signed with Warner Classics in 2016 and has released four albums under that label: Saint-Saëns, Ravel, Gershwin: Piano Concertos; Ravel - Debussy - Bizet; Bach – Beethoven; and Angels & Demons. The first single from Bach – Beethoven reached the top of the Apple Music A-List in 2021 and the first single from Angels & Demons reached the top of the Spotify New Classical Releases list. He has also recorded award-winning recital albums of Liszt, Debussy, and Stravinsky under the Delos label.

Von Oeyen lives in Paris and Los Angeles. His and his partner's house in Malibu was destroyed in the Woolsey Fire in November 2018. He and other plaintiffs sued the electricity company Southern California Edison for causing the fire due to mishandling of equipment in their research facility.

== Discography ==
- Liszt Piano Music. Label: Delos International/Naxos DE3412
- Andrew von Oeyen Live in Recital. Label: V&V Records (digital release)
- Debussy. Stravinsky, Newman. Label: Delos 3412
- Saint-Saëns, Piano Concerto n°2, Ravel, Concerto pour piano et Orchestre en sol majeur, Gershwin, Second Rhapsodie for piano and orchestra, Massenet, Méditation de Thais Works, Prague Philharmonia; Emmanuel Villaume (conductor). Label: Warner Classics 2017.
- Ravel - Debussy - Bizet, Prague Philharmonia; Emmanuel Villaume (conductor). Label: Warner Classics 2018
- Bach – Beethoven. Label: Warner Classics 2021
- Angels & Demons. Label: Warner Classics 2024

== Sources ==
- McQuilkin, Terry (February 27, 2017). "Second symphony candidate, orchestra shine together in challenging program". The Register-Guard .
- Lemco, Gary (February 13, 2017). "Pianist Andrew von Oeyen embraces his twin cultural loyalties with brilliant elan". Audiophile Audition.
- Kaczmarczyk, Jeffrey (February 1, 2014). "Grand Rapids Symphony, pianist Andrew von Oeyen, triumphant success with all-Russian program". m.live.com.
- Herman, Kenneth January 16, 2012). "Andrew von Oeyen Makes Stunning Debut in Schumann Concerto", San Diego Arts.
- Johnson, Lawrence B. (May 24, 2008). "DSO's surprise pianist is a genuine Rach star". Detroit News. Accessed 12 November 2008.
- Delacoma, Wynne (July 11, 2005). "Villaume conducts memorable Grant Park debut", Chicago Sun-Times. Accessed 19 December 2007.
- Lee Hyo-won (12 July 2009). "Sarah Chang Aims to Cast Off Prodigy Label". Korea Times, . Accessed 9 April 2010.
- Page, Tim (May 7, 2007). "Andrew von Oeyen, Keenly Attuned to Liszt's Grand Design". Washington Post. Accessed 18 December 2007.
- PBS. A Capitol Fourth in High Definition
