= Kaspar Zehnder =

Swiss conductor

Kaspar Zehnder (born 27 August 1970 in Riggisberg, Canton of Bern) is a Swiss conductor and flutist. He studied classical languages at the Lyceum in Bern and music at the University of the Arts Bern. His music teachers included Heidi Indermühle (flute), Ewald Körner (conducting), Agathe Rytz-Jaggi (piano) and Peter Streiff and Arthur Furer (music theory). He further took conducting master classes with Ralf Weikert, Werner-Andreas Albert and Horst Stein. He also studied chamber music and was a member of the Mozart European Academy, where his main mentor was Aurèle Nicolet.

Zehnder gained his first conducting experience with the Kammerorchester Neufeld Bern and the Burgdorfer Kammerorchester. From 1997 to 2006, he was an associate professor at and conductor of the Orchestra of the Bern Academy of Arts (Hochschule der Künste Bern), where he focused on contemporary music.

Zehnder was chief conductor of the Prague Philharmonia from 2005 to 2008. He currently is the artistic director at the Murten Classics Festival. He is also music director at the Zentrum Paul Klee in Bern and the director of the Ensemble Paul Klee. Since 2014, he is the music director of the Symphoniy Orchester Biel Solothurn.

Preceded by Jiří Bělohlávek	Chief Conductor, Prague Philharmonia; 2005-2008	Succeeded by Jakub Hrůša
