= Graeme Jenkins =

British conductor, specializing in opera (born 1958)

Graeme James Ewers Jenkins (born 1958 in London, United Kingdom) is a British conductor, specializing in opera. He read music at the University of Cambridge, and later studied conducting at the Royal College of Music. He worked with Norman Del Mar and Sir David Willcocks, and as an Adrian Boult Conducting Scholar, Jenkins conducted Britten's Albert Herring and The Turn of the Screw. From 1986 to 1991, he was music director of Glyndebourne Touring Opera.

Jenkins made his first conducting appearance with the Dallas Opera in 1992, and in 1994, became the company's music director. In Dallas, he became the youngest ever British conductor to have conducted Richard Wagner's Der Ring des Nibelungen. In May 2007, Jenkins extended his Dallas contract to May 2011. Subsequent to a further extension of his Dallas contract to May 2013, the Dallas Opera announced in May 2011 the conclusion of Jenkins' tenure after the 2012–2013 season. He now has the title of Music Director Emeritus of the Dallas Opera. Jenkins conducted the first commercial recording of Tobias Picker's opera Thérèse Raquin with Dallas Opera for the Chandos label. In Europe, Jenkins was principal guest conductor of the Cologne Opera from 1997 to 2002. Jenkins debuted in 2005 at the Vienna State Opera with Britten's Billy Budd.

Jenkins and his wife Joanna have two daughters, Martha and Isabella. They have a home in Dorset.

Cultural offices
Preceded by Jane Glover	Music Director, Glyndebourne Touring Opera; 1986-1991	Succeeded by Ivor Bolton
Preceded by Nicola Rescigno (de facto chief conductor)	Music Director, Dallas Opera; 1994-2013	Succeeded by Emmanuel Villaume
