= Jiří Bělohlávek =

Czech conductor (1946–2017)

Jiří Bělohlávek CBE
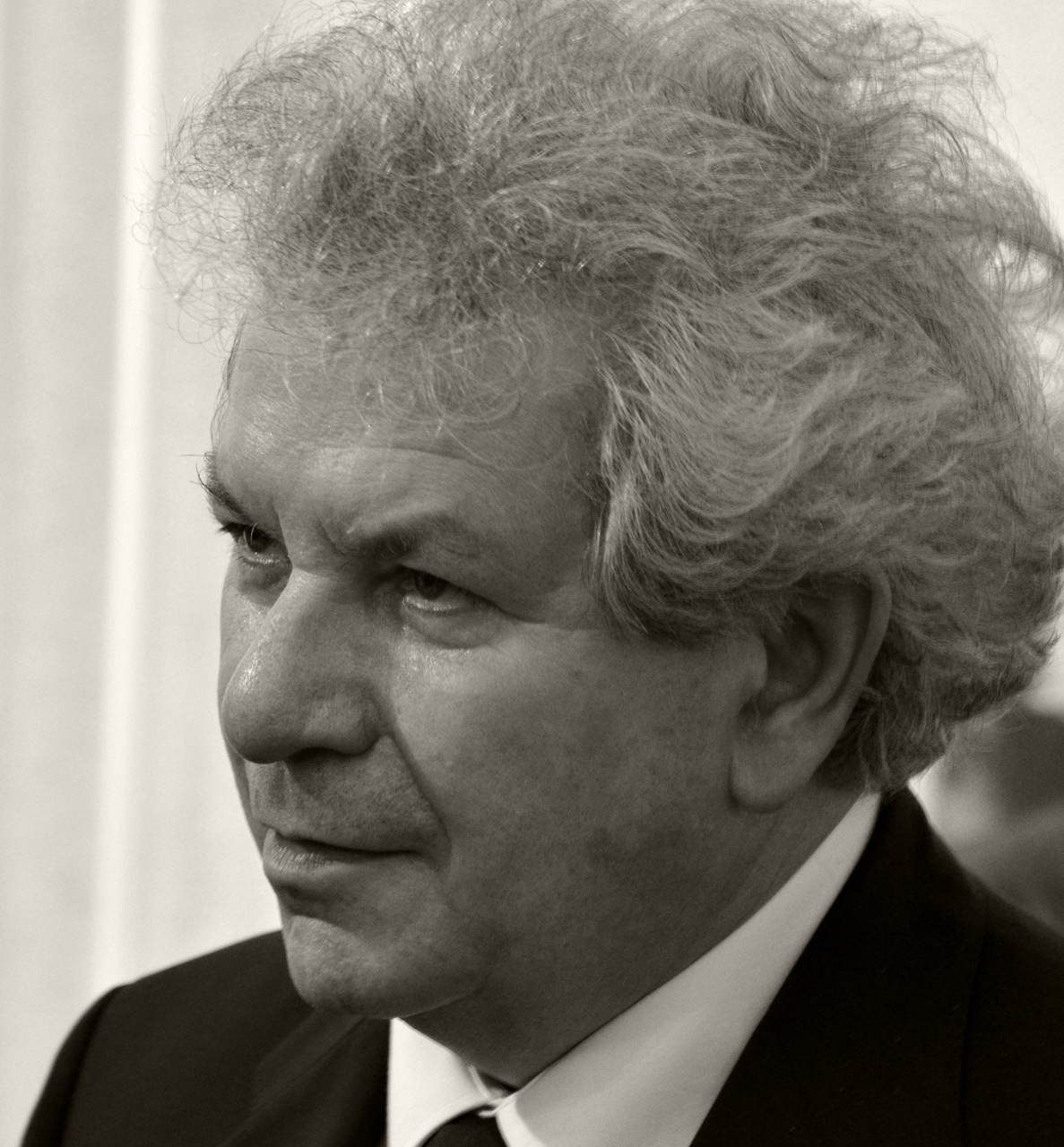
- Bělohlávek in 2013
- Born: 24 February 1946; Prague, Czechoslovak Republic
- Died: 31 May 2017 (aged 71)
- Occupation: Conductor

Jiří Bělohlávek CBE (Czech pronunciation: [jɪr̝iː bjɛloɦlaːvɛk]; 24 February 1946 – 31 May 2017) was a Czech conductor. He was a leading interpreter of Czech classical music, and became chief conductor of the Czech Philharmonic Orchestra in 1990, a role he would serve on two occasions during a combined span of seven years (1990–92, 2012–17). He also served a six-year tenure as the chief conductor of the BBC Symphony Orchestra from 2006 to 2012. He gained international renown and repute for his performances of the works of Czech composers such as Antonín Dvořák and Bohuslav Martinů, and was credited as "the most profound proponent of Czech orchestral music" by Czech music specialist Professor Michael Beckerman.

== Early career ==
Bělohlávek was born in Prague. His father was a barrister and judge. In his youth he studied cello with Miloš Sádlo and later graduated from the Prague Conservatory and the Academy of Performing Arts in Prague. After graduation, he studied conducting for two years with Sergiu Celibidache.

== Czechoslovakia and the Czech Republic ==
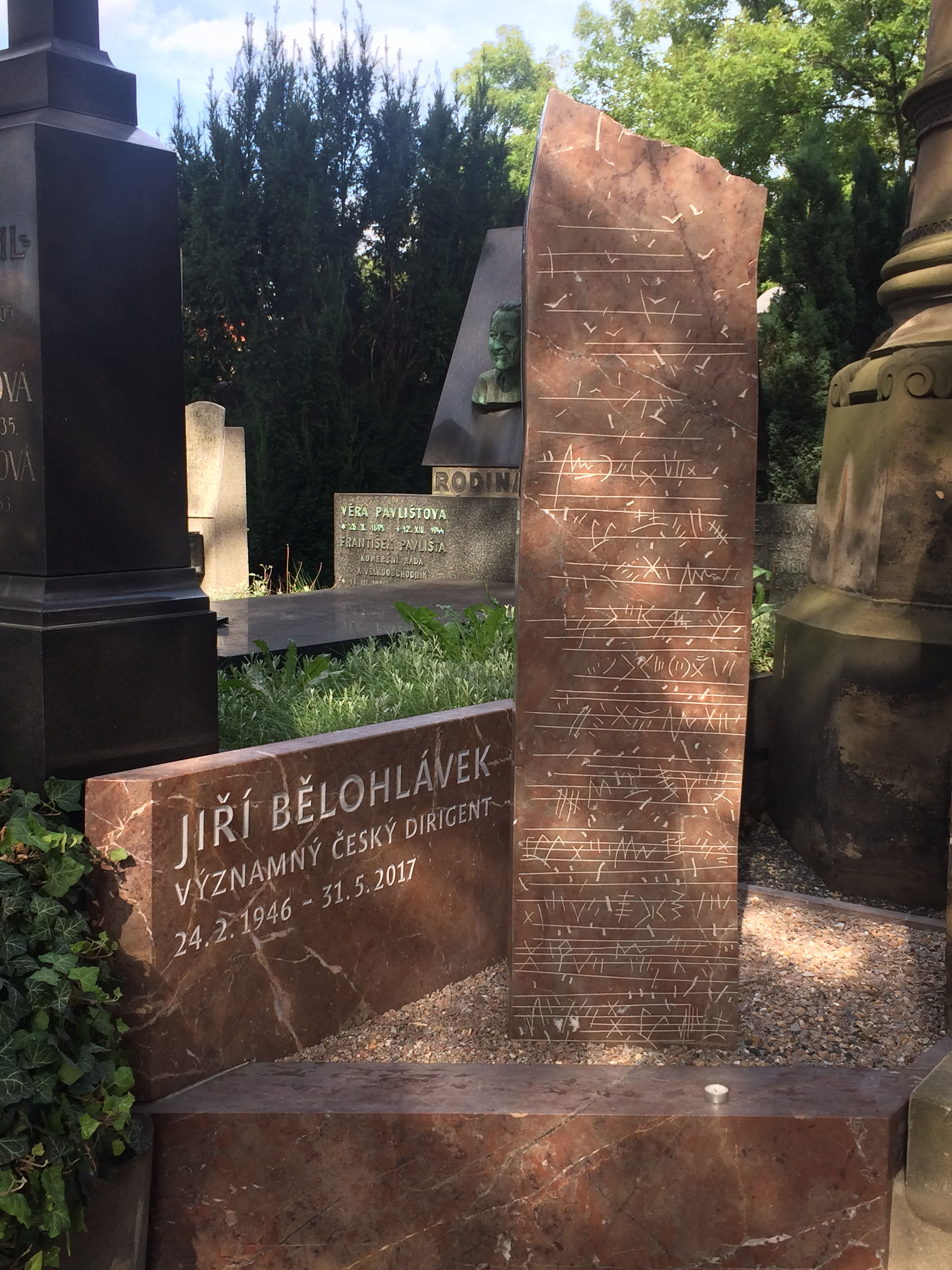
Grave of Bělohlávek at Vyšehrad Cemetery

In 1970, Bělohlávek won the Czech Young Conductors' Competition. He later served for two years as an assistant conductor at the Czech Philharmonic. From 1972 to 1978, he was conductor of the Brno Philharmonic; he was then chief conductor of the Prague Symphony Orchestra until 1989. The Communist authorities prohibited Bělohlávek from touring in Berlin and Israel.

Bělohlávek became chief conductor of the Czech Philharmonic in 1990, after the Velvet Revolution. However, in 1991, the orchestra reorganized and controversially voted to appoint Gerd Albrecht its new principal conductor to replace Bělohlávek. Instead of remaining until Albrecht's accession, Bělohlávek resigned from the orchestra in 1992. He subsequently founded the Prague Philharmonia (Pražská komorní filharmonie) in 1993, after the Czech Ministry of Defence had offered funding for training 40 young musicians. Bělohlávek had auditioned musicians for the orchestra, but the ministry withdrew its funding the next year. He subsequently secured private funding for the orchestra, and served as its first music director. After the orchestra's public debut in 1994, he recorded and performed with it in concerts worldwide. He conducted the Prague Philharmonia at its first BBC Proms appearance in 2004, in a televised performance. In 2005, he relinquished his post with the Prague Philharmonia, and subsequently became the orchestra's conductor laureate. He conducted his final concert on 7 May 2017 with the Prague Philharmonia.

In 1997, Bělohlávek became Professor of Conducting at the Prague Academy of Music and became principal guest conductor of the opera company of the Národní divadlo (Prague National Theatre) the following year. He was also chairman of the Prague Spring International Music Festival. Conductors who studied under Bělohlávek include Tomáš Netopil and Jakub Hrůša. In December 2010, Bělohlávek was re-appointed to the chief conductorship of the Czech Philharmonic Orchestra, effective with the 2012–2013 season, with an initial contract of four years. In January 2017, the Czech Philharmonic announced the extension of Bělohlávek's contract through the 2021–2022 season. He remained in the post until his death on 31 May 2017.

== International career ==
From 1995 to 2000, Bělohlávek was principal guest conductor of the BBC Symphony Orchestra (BBC SO). In February 2005, he was named its twelfth chief conductor, effective July 2006, with an initial contract of 3 years. Bělohlávek was the first past BBC SO principal guest conductor to be named chief conductor of the BBC SO. His tenure with the BBC SO began with the First Night of the 2006 Proms. He first conducted the Last Night of the Proms in 2007, the first conductor of the Last Night who was not a native English speaker. In September 2007, Bělohlávek extended his contract with the BBC Symphony to 2012. He made a guest appearance at the 2009 Last Night as one of the vacuum cleaner performers in Malcolm Arnold's A Grand, Grand Overture. Bělohlávek conducted the Last Night of the Proms again in 2010 and in 2012. He concluded his BBC SO chief conductorship in 2012 and took the title of conductor laureate with the BBC SO. Bělohlávek was awarded an honorary CBE "for services to music" in April 2012. As conductor laureate, he continued to appear until the month before his death, with his final BBC SO concert conducting Dvořák's Requiem.

In opera, Bělohlávek conducted Jenůfa, Tristan und Isolde and Rusalka at Glyndebourne. He made his Metropolitan Opera (Met) debut on 17 December 2004 conducting Káťa Kabanová, with Karita Mattila in the title role. He returned to the Met in January and February 2007 for Jenůfa and again in February and March 2009 for Eugene Onegin and Rusalka.

Bělohlávek first guest-conducted the Rotterdam Philharmonic Orchestra (RPhO) in 1994. In April 2012, the RPhO announced the appointment of Bělohlávek as its next principal guest conductor, effective with the 2012–2013 season. He held the RPhO post until his death.

Bělohlávek made recordings for the Supraphon, Chandos, Harmonia Mundi, Warner Classics, Decca and Deutsche Grammophon record labels.

His performances of the music of Dvorak have been released in video on several DVDs. His 1993 performances with the Prague Symphony Orchestra are available on two Arthaus DVDs consisting of Symphony No. 7, Slavonic Dances Op. 72, Romance for Violin and Orchestra and Violin Concerto (both with Ivan Ženatý), 5 Biblical Songs, and the Te Deum featuring the Prague Symphonic Choir. His 2014 performances of all nine Dvorak Symphonies with the Czech Philharmonic Orchestra were released by the orchestra on DVD and include interviews with him about each symphony.

He gained international renown and repute for his performances of the works of Czech composers such as Antonín Dvořák and Bohuslav Martinů, and was credited as "the most profound proponent of Czech orchestral music" by Czech music specialist Professor Michael Beckerman.

== Personal life ==
Bělohlávek married Anna Fejérová in 1971 and the couple had two daughters. He died of cancer on 31 May 2017, aged 71. His wife and daughters survived him.

Cultural offices
| Preceded by Jindřich Rohan | Music Director, Prague Symphony Orchestra; 1977–1990 | Succeeded by Petr Altrichter |
| Preceded by (no predecessor) | Music Director, Prague Philharmonia; 1994–2005 | Succeeded by Kaspar Zehnder |
