= Emmanuel Villaume =

French orchestra conductor (born 1964)

Emmanuel Villaume (born 1964 in Strasbourg, France) is a French orchestra conductor. He is currently music director of the Dallas Opera and chief conductor of the Prague Philharmonia.

== Biography ==
Villaume began his musical education at the Strasbourg Conservatory. He continued his studies in Paris at Khâgne and the Sorbonne where he studied literature, philosophy and musicology. At age 21, he became stage manager and dramaturg at the Opéra National du Rhin, where he met Spiros Argiris, who was then the music director of the Festival dei Due Mondi in Spoleto. Villaume subsequently studied conducting with Argiris, and later became an assistant conductor to Seiji Ozawa.

Villaume made his American conducting debut in 1990 with Le nozze di Figaro at the Spoleto Festival USA. He was named music director for opera and orchestra of the Spoleto Festival USA in October 2000, and held the post from 2001 to 2010. He made his Carnegie Hall debut in 2002 conducting the Montreal Symphony. He first conducted at the Metropolitan Opera in September 2004 in Madama Butterfly. Villaume first conducted at Dallas Opera in 1998. He made his debut with the Chicago Symphony Orchestra in 2007. In April 2013, Villaume was named music director of the Dallas Opera, with immediate effect. In November 2015, the Dallas Opera announced that Villaume's contract as music director had been extended through June 2022.

Internationally, Villaume made his Orchestre de Paris debut in 2000 as well as his debut at the Royal Opera House, Covent Garden conducting Les Contes d'Hoffmann in October 2000. In January 2007 he made his conducting debut at La Fenice in Venice with Meyerbeer's Il crociato in Egitto. He became chief conductor of the Slovenian Philharmonic Orchestra in 2008, and held the post through 2013. He became chief conductor of the Slovak Philharmonic in 2009, and held the post through 2016. In October 2014, the Prague Philharmonia announced the appointment of Villaume as its fourth chief conductor, effective with the 2015-2016 season, with an initial contract of 3 years.

Villaume holds an honorary doctorate from the University of Indianapolis.

== Selected discography ==
- Maurice Emmanuel: Ouverture pour un conte gai / Symphony 1 & 2 / Suite française (Slovenian Philharmonic Orchestra). Timpani Recordings 1C1189.
- French Heroines (Nathalie Manfrino) Decca Records CD
- Puccini: La Rondine (Ainhoa Arteta and Marcus Haddock, Washington National Opera Orchestra and Chorus). Decca B001Q2RVTY DVD
- Souvenirs: (Anna Netrebko, Prague Philharmonia). Deutsche Grammophon 4777451 CD
- Duets: (Anna Netrebko and Rolando Villazón) (Staatskapelle Dresden and Orchestre National de Belgique; Conductors: Nicola Luisotti and Emmanuel Villaume). Deutsche Grammophon 4776635 CD
- Jules Massenet: Le Cid (Placido Domingo, Kennedy Center). House of Opera, 2005 DVD
- Jules Massenet: Chérubin (Michelle Breedt, Patrizia Ciofi, Carmela Remigio, Giorgio Surjan, Teresa di Bari, Alessandra Palomba, Nicola Ebau, et al.; Orchestra and Chorus of Teatro Lirico di Cagliari Dynamic CDS 508/1-2 CD and DV 33508 DVD
- Jacques Offenbach: La Grande-Duchesse de Gerolstein (Lucia Valentini-Terrani, Carlo Allemano, Thomas Morris, Richard Plaza; Orchestra Internazionale d'Italia) Dynamic CDS173 CD
- Giacomo Meyerbeer: Il crociato in Egitto (Michael Maniaci, Patrizia Ciofi, Marco Vinco, Laura Polverelli, Fernando Portari, Iorio Zennaro, Silvia Pasini, Luca Favaron, Emanuele Pedrini; Orchestra and Chorus of Teatro La Fenice) Dynamic DV 33549 DVD
- Gian Carlo Menotti: Goya (Arthaus Musik DVD, 2011)
- Gustav Mahler: Symphony No. 9. Slovenska filharmonija, 2011
- Maurice Ravel: Daphnis et Chloé, NYOC, 2014
- Heroique: (Bryan Hymel, Prague Philharmonia). Warner Classics, 2015
- Pyotr Ilyich Tchaikovsky: Iolanta. (Anna Netrebko). Deutsche Grammophon, 2015
- Saint-Saëns, Ravel, Gershwin: Piano Concertos. (Andrew von Oeyen, Prague Philharmonia). Warner Classics, 2016
- Mark Adamo: Becoming Santa Claus. Dallas Opera DVD, 2017
- Giacomo Meyerbeer: Grand Opera (Diana Damrau, Orchestra and Chorus of the Lyon Opera). Warner Classics
- Eternamente: (Angela Gheorghiu, Prague Philharmonia). Erato, Warner Classics, 2017
- Maurice Ravel, Georges Bizet, Claude Debussy: Ma mère l'Oye, Symphony in C (Bizet), Fantaisie for piano and orchestra (Debussy). Prague Philharmonia. Warner Classics, 2018
- Benjamin Bernheim, Arias. Prague Philharmonia. Deutsche Grammophon, 2019
- Giacomo Puccini: La bohème, (Sonya Yoncheva, Charles Castronovo, Royal Opera House Covent Garden orchestra and chorus). Opus Arte OA1332D, 2021
- Antonín Dvořák, Bohuslav Martinů: Symphony No. 8 (Dvořák), Toccata e due Canzoni, Prague Philharmonia 2021
- Pene Pati, Arias. Orchestre National Bordeaux Aquitaine. Warner Classics, 2022
- Richard Strauss, Charles Gounod, Felix Mendelssohn, Prague Philharmonia, 2023
- Giacomo Puccini: Manon Lescaut (Puccini), Gregory Kunde, Liceu. Major, 2024
- Pene Pati, Nessun Dorma: Orchestre National Bordeaux Aquitaine. Warner Classics, 2024
- Wolfgang Amadeus Mozart, Antonín Dvořák: (Grace Park and Prague Philharmonia). Orchid Classics, 2025
- Karel Husa: Serenade (Belfiato Quintet, Prague Philharmonia). Supraphon, 2025

Cultural offices
Preceded by Steven Sloane	Music Director, Spoleto Festival USA; 2001-2010	Succeeded by (post vacant)
Preceded by George Pehlivanian	Chief Conductor, Slovenian Philharmonic Orchestra; 2008-2013	Succeeded by Keri-Lynn Wilson
Preceded by Graeme Jenkins	Music Director, Dallas Opera; 2013-present	Succeeded by incumbent
Preceded by Jakub Hrůša	Chief Conductor, Prague Philharmonia; 2015-present	Succeeded by incumbent
