= Dallas Opera =

Opera company in Dallas, Texas, USA

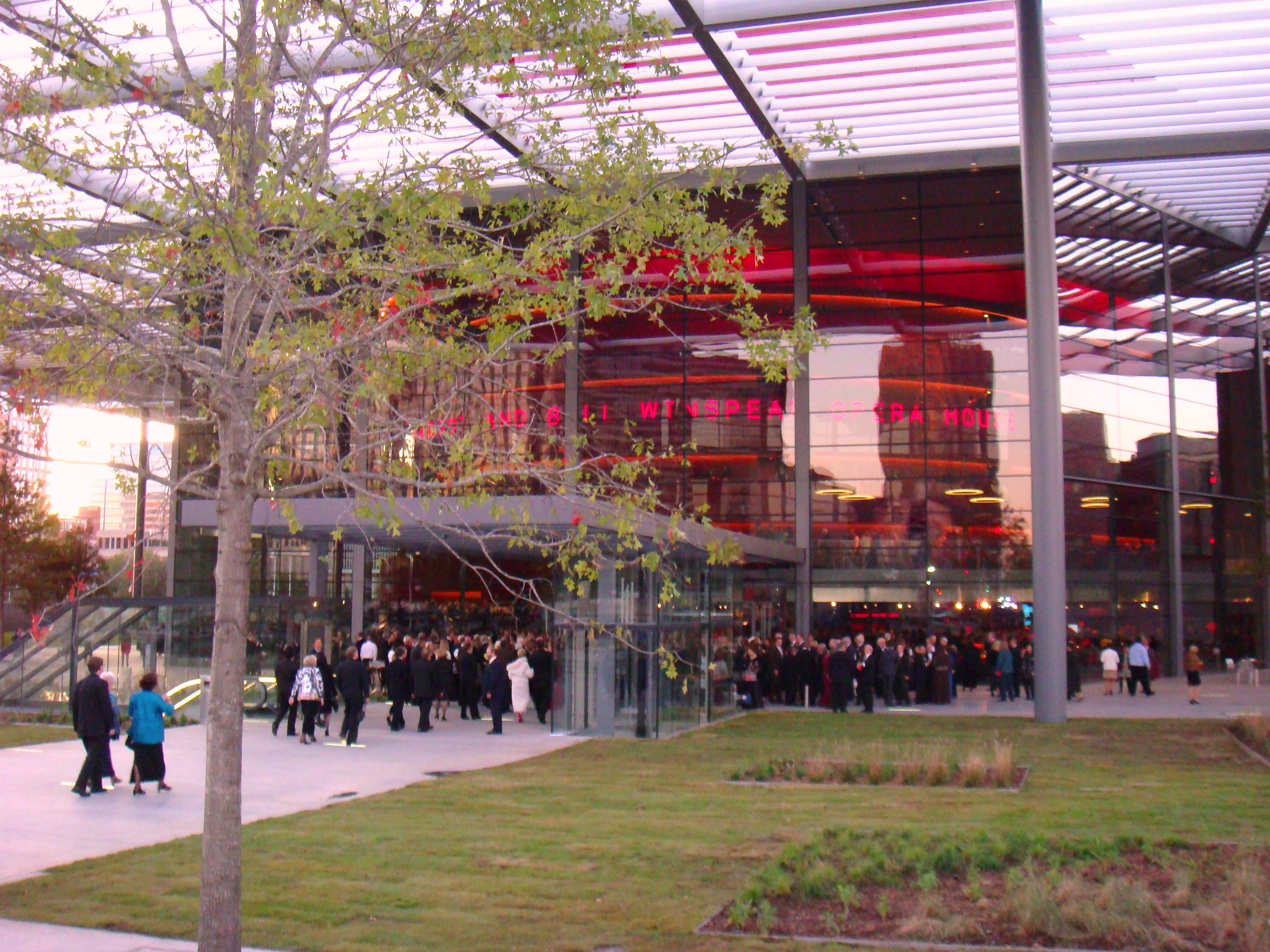
- Exterior of the Winspear Opera House
- Formation: 1957
- Founders: Lawrence Kelly and Nicolà Rescigno
- Type: Opera company
- Location: Margot and Bill Winspear Opera House, Dallas, Texas
- General Director: David Lomelí
- Music Director: Emmanuel Villaume
- Website: dallasopera.org

The Dallas Opera is an American opera company located in Dallas, Texas. The company performs at the Margot and Bill Winspear Opera House, one venue of the AT&T Performing Arts Center.

== History ==
The company was founded in 1957 as the Dallas Civic Opera by Lawrence Kelly and Nicolà Rescigno, both of whom had been active with Lyric Opera of Chicago, the first as administrator, the second as artistic director. In its first season, Maria Callas performed in an inaugural recital conducted by Rescigno, at Music Hall at Fair Park. Critic John Ardoin described the role of Lawrence Kelly in establishing the company as follows:

“Everything must ride or fall on the taste of one man…. As it did with Kelly and his company. He went through all kinds of crap for 10 months out of the year -- mean fund-raising and playing social games and all -- to do what he loved the most for two months out of the year. And Kelly didn't care if you did Aida, or Rigoletto, or Carmen -- it just had to be the best Aida, and Rigoletto, and Carmen. He would agonize over it, and think it out. Nothing was ever casual with him, in the casting or the productions. That's not to say he didn't make mistakes. But, ultimately, it was his taste, and his vision, and his commitment that did the trick".

Many singers made their American debuts in Dallas, such as Montserrat Caballé, Plácido Domingo, Gwyneth Jones, Waltraud Meier, Magda Olivero, Joan Sutherland, and Jon Vickers. Designer/director Franco Zeffirelli also made his US debut there.

The company's first commission was for Robert Xavier Rodriguez's one-act children's opera Monkey See, Monkey Do in 1985. The Dallas Opera commissioned Dominick Argento’s The Aspern Papers and gave its world premiere, which was nationally broadcast on PBS's “Great Performances” series in 1988. Additional commissions were for Tobias Picker's Thérèse Raquin in 2001 and Jake Heggie's Moby-Dick in 2010. Recent commissions have included British composer Joby Talbot and Gene Scheer's Everest, Great Scott by Jake Heggie and Terrence McNally, and Mark Adamo's Becoming Santa Claus.

The company moved to the Winspear Opera House as of the 2009-2010 season and moved its administrative offices into the building in the spring of 2010.

== Administration ==
Anthony Whitworth-Jones became General Director in 2001. However, his plans for expanding the company's repertory did not come to fruition in the wake of an economic downturn during his tenure, and he stood down from the post in 2003. His successor, Karen Stone, was appointed in mid-2003 as the company's fifth General Director. She had previously worked with Graeme Jenkins at the Cologne Opera in Germany, where he was principal guest conductor. Stone resigned from the post effective 30 September 2007.

Keith Cerny was general director and CEO from May 2010 until January 2018. During his tenure, he initiated the company's public simulcast series in locations ranging from AT&T Stadium (home of the Dallas Cowboys) to Klyde Warren Park. This included a nine-city simulcast of Tod Machover's Death and the Powers. Cerny is credited with stabilizing company finances, which allowed both the commissioning of new operas and new initiatives such as the "Linda and Mitch Hart Institute for Women Conductors at The Dallas Opera" (2015) designed to address the challenge of gender imbalance at the top levels of the classical music industry. In November 2015, Cerny's existing contract as General Director and CEO was extended until 2022. In December 2017, the company announced Cerny's resignation from the Dallas Opera, effective January 2018.

Emmanuel Villaume became the company's music director on 30 April 2013. Graeme Jenkins, who was music director from 1994 to 2013, now has the title of Music Director Emeritus with the company. In November 2015, Villaume's contract was extended through June 2022.

In April 2018, the company announced the appointment of Ian Derrer as its next general director and CEO effective July 2018. He previously worked with Dallas Opera from 2014 to 2016 as an artistic administrator. Derrer is scheduled to conclude his tenure with Dallas Opera on 30 June 2026.

== The Linda and Mitch Hart Institute for Women Conductors ==
In 2015, The Dallas Opera launched the Linda and Mitch Hart Institute for Women Conductors. During its first 10 years, it has attracted interest from more than 500 potential candidates.

== Sources ==
- Ardoin, John, The Callas Legacy, Old Tappan, New Jersey: Scribner and Sons, 1991 ISBN 0-684-19306-X
- Ardoin, John and Fitzgerald, Gerald, Callas: The Art and the Life, New York: Holt, Rinehart and Winston, 1974, ISBN 0-03-011486-1
- Cantrell, Scott, "And That Spells Dallas", Opera News, November 2006 (Account of 50th Anniversary season under General Director, Karen Stone)
- Davis, Ronald L, (with foreword by) Miller, Henry S, Jr., La Scala West: The Dallas Opera Under Kelly and Rescigno, University Park, Texas: Southern Methodist University Press, 2000
- Galatopoulos, Stelios, Maria Callas, Sacred Monster, New York: Simon and Schuster, 1998, ISBN 0-684-85985-8
