= List of compositions by Joseph Holbrooke =

Joseph Holbrooke by E.O. Hoppé, 1913

This is a comprehensive, annotated list of compositions by Joseph Holbrooke. For a simplified version of this catalogue, arranged by opus number, see List of works by Joseph Holbrooke.

Holbrooke was notorious for continually revising and recasting his compositions in different forms:

"The most disconcerting aspect of any inquiry into the works of Holbrooke is that elucidation is not proportionate to the amount of facts unearthed: instead confusion, contradiction and complication tend to increase. It is characteristic that even the composer's name can be found in any combination of Joseph or Josef and Holbrook or Holbrooke. Many works bore various opus numbers at different periods; conversely, an opus number can be found attached to several different works; and the identity of some earlier compositions, particularly in the realm of chamber music, is difficult to trace because of recasting and incorporation into new definitive versions. It is in a way ironic that such a situation should arise with Holbrooke of all composers, for from the first he gave evidence of orderliness of mind in listing and designating his music (e.g. Poem No.2, Symphonic Quartet No.1); but revisions, rearrangements and reshufflings led to havoc from which not even works of later date, when the numbering system might have been expected to have settled down, are exempt."

== Dramatic ==
=== Opera ===
- Varenka (c.1907) [possibly unfinished, no longer extant ]
- Pierrot and Pierrette, Op.36a (1908) [later revised as The Stranger ]
- Dylan, Son of the Wave, Op.53 (1909) [No.2 of the cycle The Cauldron of Annwn]
- The Children of Don, Op.56 (1910–12) [No.1 of the cycle The Cauldron of Annwn]
- The Enchanter, opera-ballet, Op.70 (1914) [originally assigned as Op.65, also titled The Wizard ]
- Bronwen, Op.75 (1915–24, revised 1928) [No.3 of the cycle The Cauldron of Annwn, originally assigned as Op.67 ]
- The Sailor's Arms, operetta, Op.105 (1925–30)
- The Snob, operetta, Op.114 (1920s) [originally assigned as Op.49, also assigned as Op.88, also assigned as Op.102 ]
- Tamlane, opera-ballet, Op.132 (1941–43)

=== Ballet ===
- Pierrot, ballet suite, Op.36b [for interpolation into the opera Pierrot and Pierrette, Op.36a (1908), adapted from the Pantomime suite, Op.16a (1896–97) ]
  1. The Revels
  2. Arlequin
  3. Columbine
  4. Pantalon
  5. Clown
  6. Tarantelle
- Coromanthe (c.1917) [also titled The Dawn of Love, no longer extant, originally assigned as Op.61 ]
- The Moth and the Flame, Op.62 (1912–17) [originally published under the pseudonym Jean Hanze]
- The Masque of the Red Death, Op.65 (1904–13) [originally assigned as Op.47, originally styled Poem No.8, also titled The Red Masque, originally published under the pseudonym Jean Hanze]
  1. The Palace Gates, outside - Entrance of the Guests
  2. Dance of the Buffoons, and the deformed
  3. The Violet Room - Dance of Prince Prospero
  4. The Blue Room - A Bacchanal Dance
  5. The Scarlet Room - Dance of Death
- Pandora (1919) [recast in Film Music Suite No.1, for dance orchestra and piano, Op.84 (c.1927)]
- Bronwen, ballet music, Op.75a (1929) [for interpolation into the opera Bronwen, Op.75]
  1. Welsh Dance No.1
  2. Welsh Dance No.2
  3. Welsh Dance No.3
  4. Irish Dance No.1
  5. Irish Dance No.2
- Aucassin and Nicolette, Op.115 (1935)

=== Incidental music ===
- Pontorewyn, Op.26c (1914) [originally assigned as Op.17 No.8 ]
- Llwyfan y byd, Op.117a (1935) [also titled Theatre of the World ]
- Beccles Tower, Op.117b (1930s)
- Harlech, pageant (1930s)
- Spalding, pageant (1930s)

== Orchestral ==
=== Symphonies ===
- Les Hommages, Op.40 (1900, revised 1904) [styled both Symphony No.1 and Suite No.3, originally titled Bohemian Suite, originally assigned as Op.37 ]
  1. Festiva (Marcia heroique): Hommage à Wagner
  2. Serenata: Hommage à Grieg
  3. Elegiac Poeme: Hommage à Dvořák
  4. Introduction and Russian Dance: Hommage à Tschaikowsky
- Symphony No.1, Homage to E.A. Poe, Op.48 [see under Choral music]
- Symphony No.2, Apollo and the Seaman, Op.51 [see under Choral music]
- Symphony No.3 in E minor, Ships, Op.90 (1925) [also titled Nelson, also titled National Symphony, also titled Our Navy ]
  1. Warships
  2. Hospital Ships
  3. Merchant Ships
- Symphony No.4 in B minor, Homage to Schubert, Op.95 (1928, revised c.1933 and c.1943) [also titled The Little One ]
  1. Andante sostenuto. Mesto - Scherzo (Allegro marcato) - Trio: sostenuto (quasi meno)
  2. Andantino sostenuto - Poco andantino - Andante
  3. Finale: Allegro - Andante (con moto) - Allegro
- Symphony No.5 in E♭, Wild Wales, Op.106 [see under Brass band]
- Symphony No.6 in G major, Old England, Op.107 [see under Military band]
- Symphony No.7 in D major, Al Aaraaf, for strings, Op.109 (1929) [arrangement of String Sextet, Henry Vaughan, Op.43 (1902), also styled Symphony No.6 ]
- Symphony No.8 in B♭, Dance Symphony, Op.112 [see under Solo instruments and orchestra]
- Symphony [No.9], Milton, Op.131 [see under Choral music]

=== Other ===
- Intermezzo for small orchestra, Op.2b [arrangement of Intermezzo from Fourteen Pieces (for the young), for piano, Op.2a (1890s)]
- Suite for small orchestra, Op.10b
  1. Les Graces
  2. Les Fleurs
  3. Claire de lune
  4. L'Ardeur
- Pantomime, suite for strings, Op.16a (1897) [originally assigned as Op.24, also titled Pantomimic Suite, recast as Pierrot, ballet suite, Op.36b ]
  1. Arlequin
  2. Columbine
  3. Pantalon
  4. Clown
- The Raven [Poem No.1], Op.25 (1899–1900, revised 1903) [originally assigned as Op.19 ]
- The New Renaissance, overture (c.1902) [originally assigned as Op.28, no longer extant ]
- Ode to Victory (1901) [originally styled Poem No.2, originally assigned as Op.29, no longer extant ]
- The Viking [Poem No.2], Op.32 (1901, revised 1912) [originally styled Poem No.3, originally titled The Skeleton in Armour, also titled The Corsair ]
- Ulalume [Poem No.3], Op.35 (1903) [originally styled Poem No.4 ]
- Three Blind Mice, Symphonic variations on an old English Air, Op.37 (1900) [originally assigned as Op.40 ]
- Dreamland, suite, Op.38 (c.1900)
  1. Ensemble
  2. The Dance
  3. Dreaming
  4. Hilarité
- Three Concert Waltzes (c.1904) [originally assigned as Op.44, no longer extant ]
- Dylan, fantasie, Op.53a (1910) [based on music from the opera Dylan, Op.53, also styled Prelude]
- Imperial March (1914) [another version of Triumphal March, for chorus and orchestra, Op.26a (1902, revised 1909) ]
- The Wild Fowl, fantasie, Op.56b (1918) [originally titled The Wild Sea-Fowl, based on music from the opera The Children of Don, Op.56]
- Variations on Auld Lang Syne, Op.60 (1904, revised c.1918) [originally assigned as Op.53, also titled Portraits ]
- Variations on The Girl I left behind me, Op.64 (1904–05) [originally assigned as Op.48, later assigned as Op.37b ]
- Hymn to Caridwen, Op.75b (1924) [based on music from the opera Bronwen, Op.75]
- Caradoc's Dream, for string orchestra, Op.75c (c.1920) [based on music from the opera Bronwen, Op.75]
- Six Pieces for Small Bands, Op.84 (c.1927) [originally cast as Film Music Suite No.1, for dance orchestra and piano ]
  1. Pandora
  2. Bennetta
  3. Colomba
  4. Joandis
  5. Tintinnabulo
  6. Jamboreena
- Light Dance Music, for dance orchestra (1922–25), Op.86a [originally assigned as Op.86 ]
  1. The Penguin's Walk, foxtrot (1923)
  2. Let's brighten Bognor, foxtrot (1922)
  3. Let's brighten London, foxtrot (1923)
  4. In Old Wales, foxtrot (1925)
  5. Do It Now, foxtrot (1925)
  6. Toc H, valse (1924)
  7. Let's brighten everything, valse (1923)
  8. British Legion, valse (1925)
  9. Broken China, valse (1925)
  10. Tell No Tales, charleston (1925)
- The Birds of Rhiannon, Op.87 (1925) [based on music from the operas Dylan, Op.53, The Children of Don, Op.56 and Bronwen, Op.75]
- Bogey Beasts, suite, Op.89b (c.1925) [based on Bogey Beasts for piano, Op.89a]
- Eight Pieces for Small Bands, Op.91 (c.1928) [originally cast as Film Music Suite No.2, for dance orchestra and piano ]
  1. Impromptu
  2. Arenig
  3. Carneval
  4. Casanova
  5. Marimba
  6. Flammella
  7. Serenade Appassionata
  8. Charivari
- Suite for Saxophone Band, Op.93b (c.1928) [related to Purple Rhythms for military band, Op.93a, and Danse Suite for piano and small orchestra, Op.93c, also cast as Suite for saxophone (or clarinet) and piano, Op.93b]
  1. Bohemia
  2. Old Times
  3. Andalusia
  4. Soulmate
  5. Heliotrope
  6. Carnation
- Danse Suite, for piano and small orchestra, Op.93c (c.1928) [related to Purple Rhythms for military band, Op.93a, and Suite for Saxophone Band, Op.93b, originally cast as Film Music Suite No.3, for dance orchestra and piano ]
  1. Amethyst
  2. Turquoise
  3. Ultramarine
  4. Purple
  5. Bohemia
  6. Ecstacies
- Cambrian Suite, Op.101 (c.1936)
  1. Morfa Rhuddlan
  2. All thro' the Night
  3. David of the White Rock
  4. Welsh Dances
- National Suite, Op.102a
  1. Scotch Dances
  2. Balfe - a Souvenir
  3. Old English Dances (Come Lasses and Lads)
  4. Irish Dances
- Bristol Suite, for small orchestra, Op.116a
- Symphonietta in D major for wind and brass, The Sleeper, Op.118 (c.1930) [also styled Symphony No.9, also assigned as Op.111 ]
- Amontillado, dramatic overture, Op.123 (1935)
- Suite No.1, for string orchestra, Op.125a (late 1930s) [based on Eldorado, suite for piano, Op.102b ]
- Suite No.2, for string orchestra, Op.125b (late 1930s) [based on The Lake, suite for piano, Op.102c ]
- The Pit and the Pendulum, fantasie, Op.126 (1929) [based on music from the opera-ballet The Enchanter, Op.70 ]
- The Descent into the Maelstrom, fantasie (1930s) [probably no longer extant ]

== Solo instruments and orchestra ==
- Cello Concerto (early 1900s) [originally assigned as Op.26, no longer extant, possibly recast as Fantasie-Sonate, for cello and piano, Op.19 (1904)]
- Piano Concerto in F minor, Dramatique (1896–1900) [also styled Poem No.5, no longer extant, originally assigned as Op.30, later assigned as Op.36, recast as The Song of Gwyn ap Nudd [Piano Concerto No.1], Op.52 ]
- Tragic March, for horn and orchestra, Op.51b (c.1930) [based on music from Apollo and the Seaman, dramatic symphony, Op.51 (1907) ]
- The Song of Gwyn ap Nudd [Piano Concerto No.1], Op.52 (1906–08, revised 1923) [also styled Poem No.7, derived from Piano Concerto in F minor, Dramatique (1896–1900) ]
  1. Maestoso Allegro - Animato - a tempo - Tempo primo - Più mosso al fine
  2. Poco adagio con sentimento - Tempo poco allegretto poco scherzando - Tempo I
  3. Allegro, molto fuoco - Tempo poco larghetto - Tempo primo - Poco lento - L'istesso tempo (Doppio) - Cadenza - Grandioso - brilliante
- Violin Concerto in F major, The Grasshopper, Op.59 (1909, revised 1916 and 1928) [also titled The Lyrical ]
  1. Allegro con molto fuoco
  2. Adagio non troppo con molto espressione
  3. Maestoso - Vivace giocoso
- Concerto for Saxophone (or Bassoon) in B♭, Op.88 (1927) [originally assigned as Op.85 ]
  1. Barcarolle (Allegretto grazioso)
  2. Serenade (Allegretto e espressivo)
  3. Rondo (Con brio)
- Piano Concerto No.2, L'Orient, Op.100 (1920–28) [derived from The Orient, fantasies for solo piano ]
  1. Javanese Dance
  2. Burmese Dance
  3. Singhalese Dance
- Cello Concerto in E♭ major, The Cambrian, Op.103 (1936)
  1. Andantino
  2. Adagio con espressione
  3. Finale: Andantino sostenuto - Allegro vivace
- Symphony No.8 in B♭, Dance Symphony, for piano and orchestra, Op.112 (1928–30) [also styled Piano Concerto No.3, also styled Symphony No.5, also titled The Colonies, also titled Bon-Bon, also assigned as Op.100 ]
  1. Terpsichore
  2. Dance of Passion
  3. In Savannah
- Double Concerto for clarinet, bassoon and orchestra, Tamerlane, Op.119 (1937–39) [also styled Concertino ]
  1. Allegro maestoso
  2. Andante sostenuto
  3. Allegro con brio
- Concertino for violin and cello (1937–39) [an adaptation of the Double Concerto, Op.119 ]
- Quadruple Concerto for flute, clarinet, English horn, bassoon and orchestra, Op.133 (1947)
  1. Allegro con brio
  2. Valse vibrations
  3. A la polka

== Brass band ==
- Girgenti (c.1920) [originally assigned as Op.69a, arrangement of Mezzotints for clarinet and piano, Op.55 No.7 ]
- The Butterfly of the Ballet (c.1920) [originally assigned as Op.69b, arrangement of Mezzotints for clarinet and piano, Op.55 No.6 ]
- A Hero's Dream (c.1920) [originally assigned as Op.69c, arrangement of Mezzotints for clarinet and piano, Op.55 No.2 ]
- Dylan, selection (1920s) [based on music from the opera Dylan, Op.53]
- The Children of Don, selection (1920s) [based on music from the opera The Children of Don, Op.56]
- Suite, op.85 (1920s)
  1. Air de Ballet
  2. Oriental Dance
  3. Ballathona
  4. In Mandalay
- Clive of India, dramatic overture, Op.96a (c.1937-39) [originally titled 1914 ]
- Three Trinidad Songs, Op.96b
- Symphony No.5 in E♭, Wild Wales, Op.106 (1920) [also titled Old Wales, also styled Symphony No.8 ]
  1. Rhayader
  2. Bangor Fair
  3. Llangefni
- Song of Llewellyn, Op.110b (1930s)
- Don, fantasie, Op.127 [also titled Gwydion of Don, based on music from the opera The Children of Don, Op.56]

== Military band ==
- National March, Op.26b [arrangement of Op.26a]
- Empedocles, serenade, Op.61a (1912) [also titled To Kesh, arrangement of Mezzotints for piano, Op.49 No.4 (1906)]
- Gwyn, serenade, Op.61b [arrangement of Serenade for twelve instruments, Op.61b (1916)]
- Purple Rhythms, suite, Op.93a (late 1920s)
  1. Amethyst
  2. Turquoise
  3. Nocturne
  4. Purple
- Symphony No.6 in G major, Old England, Op.107 (1928) [also styled Symphony No.7 ]
  1. The Lass of Richmond Hill
  2. Down Among the Dead Men
  3. Gentlemen of Old England
- Suite, Op.110a

== Chamber music ==
- Six Pieces for violin and piano, Op.3
  1. Melodie
  2. On the Rhine
  3. Berceuse
  4. Polka
  5. Scherzo
  6. Valse Melancolique
- Two Poems for violin and piano, Op.5 (1896)
  1. Ballade
  2. Legende
- Violin Sonata No.1, Op.6a (late 1890s, revised 1906) [also styled Sonatina ]
  1. Allegro: Marcato e moderato
  2. Nocturne: Adagio e molto espressivo
  3. Scherzo: Presto ma non troppo
  4. Rondo: Allegro con moto
- Adagio and Rondo for clarinet and piano, Op.6b (1893–94)
- Five Pieces for mandolin, violin and piano, Op.8 [originally cast as Three Pieces for mandolin and piano, or two mandolins and two guitars (1900)]
  1. Bon Jour
  2. Entr'acte
  3. Nocturne
  4. Sérénade Arabienne
  5. Valse Characteristique
- Nine Pieces for violin and piano, Op.12
  1. March
  2. Moorish Dance
  3. Recollection
  4. Berceuse
  5. Caprice
  6. Valse Lente
  7. Neapolitan
  8. Reconciliation
  9. Valse Serenade
- Cavatina and Variations [Clarinet Quintet No.1], Op.15b (1910) [Cavatina later incorporated into Clarinet Quintet, Op.27 ]
- Fantasie Quartet [String Quartet No.1 in D minor], Op.17b (1904)
  1. Departure
  2. Absence
  3. Return
- Fantasie-Sonate, for cello and piano, Op.19 (1904)
- Sextet, The Dances, Op.20 (1894, revised 1906)
  1. Bohemian Dance
  2. Valse Triste [also titled Ländler]
  3. Plantation Dance
  4. Tarantelle
- Piano Quartet No.1 in G minor, Op.21 (1905, revised 1920) [originally cast as a Piano Trio (1898) ]
  1. Allegro marcato, ma non troppo
  2. Lament: Larghetto, e molto espressione
  3. Finale: Maestoso - Allegro
- Six Pieces for violin or cello and piano, Op.23
  1. Serenade Orientale
  2. Humoreske
  3. Souvenir
  4. Remembrance
  5. Serenade
  6. Souvenir de Printemps
- Clarinet Quintet No.2 in G, Ligeia, Op.27 (1910, revised 1939 and c.1956) [also titled Fate, originally cast as a Horn Quintet (1901) ]
  1. Maestoso moderato - Poco allegro cantabile
  2. Canzonet: Andante affetuoso
  3. Poco vivace
- Trio for violin, horn and piano in D major, Op.28 (c.1904) [originally assigned as Op.25, also titled Byron ]
  1. Larghetto sostenuto - Allegro con brio
  2. Adagio ma non troppo
  3. Molto vivace
- Piano Quartet No.2 in D minor, Byron, Op.31 (1896–98, revised 1902)
  1. Allegro feroce, e vigoroso
  2. Adagio sostenuto (quasi recitativo)
  3. Con brio (molto animato)
- Sextet for piano and strings or wind, Israfel, Op.33a (1901) [also titled Soul, originally cast as a Quintet for piano and wind (1890s) ]
  1. Allegro appassionato non troppo
  2. Adagio molto espressione sostenuto
  3. Vivace marcato
- Miniature Characteristic Suite, for wind quintet, Op.33b (1897)
  1. In the Fields
  2. A Joyous Moment
  3. Minuet
  4. Lament
  5. Fanfare [also titled Une Fête]
- String Sextet in D major, Henry Vaughan, Op.43 (1902) [originally assigned as Op.16, also titled Al Aaraaf ]
  1. Adagio espressivo e molto sostenuto - Allegro con brio
  2. Andantino mesto
  3. Finale: Molto vivace
- Piano Quintet, Diabolique, Op.44 (1904)
  1. Allegro, molto fuoco, agitato
  2. Andante, molto espressione e sostenuto
  3. Valse (Diabolique): Valse grazioso
  4. Finale: Poco vivace
- Sextet for piano and strings, In Memoriam, Op.46 (1905) [originally cast as a Piano Quintet (c.1903) ]
  1. Allegro
  2. Adagio
  3. Poco vivace - Adagio
- Mezzotints, for clarinet (or violin) and piano, Op.55 [subject to frequent revision ]
  1. Nocturne
  2. Albania
  3. L'Extase [based on a theme from the first movement of the Clarinet Quintet No.2 in G, Ligeia, Op.27]
  4. Celtic Elegie
  5. From Syracuse
  6. The Butterfly [also titled The Butterfly of the Ballet ]
  7. Girgenti, cavatina [arrangement of Mezzotint for piano, Op.49 No.3]
  8. Spring Song, canzonetta [simplified and truncated arrangement of the second movement of the Clarinet Quintet, Op.27 ]
- Eileen Shona, for clarinet and string quartet or piano (c.1920) [originally included in Mezzotints, Op.55, also assigned as Op.74, later used as a replacement for the second movement of the Clarinet Quintet, Op.27 ]
- Trio for oboe, clarinet (or viola) and piano, Fairyland, Op.57 (1911) [also styled Nocturne ]
- String Quartet No.2, War Impressions, Op.58a (1915)
  1. Belgium
  2. Russia [based on a theme from the final movement of Les Hommages, suite for orchestra, Op.40 ]
- Violin Sonata No.2, Romantic, Op.59a (1917) [arrangement of the Violin Concerto, Op.59]
- Serenade for oboe d'amore, clarinet, basset horn, two saxhorns, viola, five saxophones and harp, Op.61b (1916) [also assigned as Op.52a, also titled Gwyn, based on a theme from the second movement of The Song of Gwyn ap Nudd [Piano Concerto No.1], Op.52]
- String Quartet No.3, The Pickwick Club, Op.68 (1916)
  1. Mr. Pickwick - A Field-day - Snodgrass and Winkle - Joe, the fat boy - The amorous Mr. Tupman - The Picnic - Miss Rachel - They ride - The horse shies! - The card party
  2. The romantic side of Mr. Pickwick - Sam Weller - "Mr. Jingle" (alias Trotter) - "The first of September" (Tupman and Winkle with the guns!) - Mr. Pickwick and Mrs. Bardell - Dodson and Fogg - Pickwick. His dignity unimpaired
- Folksong Suite No.1 for string quartet [String Quartet No.4], Op.71 (c.1916)
  1. Come Lasses and Lads
  2. The Last Rose of Summer
  3. Mavourneen Deelish
  4. Strathspeys and Reels
- Folksong Suite No.2 for string quartet [String Quartet No.5], Op.72 (c.1917) [also styled String Quartet No.2, also titled Song and Dance ]
  1. Strathspeys
  2. Song of the Bottle
  3. All Through the Night
  4. Irish Jigs
- Celtic Suite for violin and piano, Op.72a (1917) [arrangement of Folksong Suite No.2 for string quartet [String Quartet No.5], Op.72 (c.1917)]
- Folksong Suite No.3 for string quartet [String Quartet No.6], Op.73 (c.1918)
  1. The Girl I left behind me
  2. Soldier's Song
  3. David of the White Rock
  4. Auld Lang Syne
- Danse Moderne, for violin and piano, Op.73b
- Nocturne, for violin and piano, Op.74b
- Violin Sonata No.3, Orientale, Op.83 (1926)
- Cyrene, for clarinet and piano, Op.88a (1930) [arrangement of the slow movement from the Saxophone Concerto in B♭, Op.88 (1927)]
- Suite for saxophone (or clarinet) and piano, Op.93b [arrangement of Suite for Saxophone Band, Op.93b, related to Purple Rhythms for military band, Op.93a, and Danse Suite for piano and small orchestra, Op.93c]
  1. Bohemia
  2. Old Times
  3. Andalusia
  4. Soulmate
  5. Heliotrope
  6. Carnation
- Phryne, nocturne for saxophone, clarinet, bassoon, violin or flute and piano (1939) [arrangement of Nocturne from Purple Rhythms for military band, Op.93a]
- Serenade in D♭ for flute, oboe, clarinet and bassoon, Op.94a (1929)
  1. Moonlight on the Water
  2. Sad Memories
  3. Scherzo Caprice
- Eulalie, ballade for horn and piano, Op.94b [originally styled Ballade in A minor and assigned as Op.51b, based on a theme from Apollo and the Seaman, dramatic symphony, Op.51]
- Sonata for alto saxophone (or bassoon) and piano, Op.99 [arrangement of Saxophone Concerto in B♭, Op.88 (1927)]
- Cambria, Suite No.1 for string quartet, Op.101 [arrangement of Cambrian Suite for orchestra, Op.101]
- Suite for flute and piano, Op.116b
- Apollo, quintet for four clarinets and piano, Op.120 [also assigned as Op.120b, also assigned as Op.120c, also assigned as Op.51b, possibly related to Apollo and the Seaman, dramatic symphony, Op.51]
- Arietta, for harp and flute, Op.120b (1930s)
- Irene, nonet for two violins, viola, cello, double bass, flute, oboe, clarinet and bassoon, Op.129 (late 1930s)
- Bassoon Quintet, Eleanora, Op.134 (1940s)
- Octet for wind, double bass and horn, Over Many Lands, Op.135 (1951)
  1. Trinidad
  2. Barbados
  3. Colerado
  4. Jangolo (Teneriffe)
  5. Kesh (Ireland)
  6. Tueuman & Fugue

== Piano ==
- Ten Pieces (for the young), Op.2a (1890s)
  1. Study in G
  2. Study in B♭
  3. Study in F
  4. A Pleading Child, bagatelle
  5. A Wilful Child, bagatelle
  6. Suave Dance, bagatelle
  7. Petit Mazurka, bagatelle
  8. Dance Rustique, bagatelle
  9. Intermezzo
  10. The Old Home
- Ten Pieces, Op.4 (1890s)
  1. Three Blind Mice, valse
  2. Mazurka
  3. Valse
  4. Orientale
  5. Scaramouche
  6. Pantalon
  7. Scherzo
  8. Harlequinade
  9. Carneval
  10. Alsacienne
- Eleven Pieces (for the young), Op.10a (1890s)
  1. A Happy Thought
  2. Forgotten
  3. Valse Gracieuse
  4. Columbine
  5. Acrobats
  6. Matinee
  7. Valse Noble
  8. Les Graces
  9. Scherzino, bagatelle
  10. Petite Romance, bagatelle
  11. Gnomes, bagatelle
- Seven Pieces, Op.17a (1890s)
  1. Clair de lune
  2. For the King, march
  3. Coquette, valse
  4. Le Crepuscule
  5. Gavotte
  6. Barcarolle
  7. A Valentine
- Miniature Suite, Op.18a (1890s) [originally titled Kleine Suite ]
  1. Whims
  2. Valse Grotesque
  3. Scherzo
  4. Affection
  5. Sorrow
- Suite moderne, Op.18b (1893–96)
  1. Scherzo Humoristique
  2. Valse Romanesque
  3. Nocturne [also titled By the Sea ]
  4. Bacchanale [also titled L'Orgie - Bacchanale Fantasie ]
- Coromanthe, waltz for two pianos, Op.18c [probably relating to the orchestral ballet Coromanthe (late 1910s) which is no longer extant]
- Ten Rhapsodie Etudes, Op.42 (1898–1905)
  1. Caprice
  2. Poursuivant
  3. Energique
  4. La Fantastique
  5. Nuit Tenebreuse
  6. Nocturne
  7. Toccata
  8. Fantoches
  9. Valse Fantasie
  10. Novelette
- Duo in D major, for two pianos, Op.43a [arrangement of String Sextet in D major, Henry Vaughan, Op.43 (1902)]
- Impressions of a Tour: Ten Mezzotints, Op.49 (1906)
  1. Bay of Naples
  2. Palermo
  3. Girgenti
  4. Empedocles
  5. Malta
  6. Syracuse
  7. Adriatic
  8. Brindisi
  9. Corfu
  10. Marseilles
- Book of Wonder, suite, Op.58b (early 1920s)
  1. Golden Dragons
  2. Troubadours
  3. Jackdaws
- Prelude and Fugue, for two pianos, Op.63a [arrangement of Grand Prelude and Fugue for organ, Op.63 (1917)]
- Four Futurist Dances, Op.66 (1914) [originally assigned as Op.59c, originally published under the pseudonym Jean Hanze]
  1. Leprechaun Dance
  2. Demon's Dance
  3. Troglodyte Dance
  4. Trollops' Dance
- Jamaican Dances, Set 1 Ring Tunes, Op.67 No.1 (1922) [originally published as Op.85]
  1. Where's My Lover?
  2. Hear Duppy Talk
  3. Ring a Diamond
  4. On the carpet
  5. Oh! Palmer Oh!
  6. Baby
- Jamaican Dances, Set 2 Digging Sings, Op.67 No.2 (1922) [originally published as Op.85]
  1. Ring Dance
  2. Deggy Dance
  3. Teacher Bailey
  4. Rosy-bell-o!
  5. Little Sally Water
  6. Drill him constab
- Jamaican Dances, Set 3 Ring Tunes, Op.67 No.3 (1922) [originally published as Op.85]
  1. Poor Little Zeddy
  2. Clip-clap
  3. Timber lay
  4. Rub 'im down Joe
  5. Hallo! me honey
  6. Jump, shamador
- Jamaican Dances, Set 4 Dancing Tunes, Op.67 No.4 (1922) [originally published as Op.85]
  1. Crahss lookin' dog
  2. Marty go home
  3. Bah-lim-bo
  4. All me money
  5. Jimmy Rampy
  6. Koromante Dance
- An Enchanted Garden, suite, Op.70a (c.1920) [based on music from the opera-ballet The Enchanter, Op.70]
  1. A Ray of Sunshine
  2. Chasing the Butterfly
  3. Brownies
- Celtic Suite, Op.72b (1917) [largely based on Folksong Suite No.2 for string quartet [String Quartet No.5], Op.72 (c.1917)]
  1. Uliam Dhoan
  2. All Through the Night
  3. Song of the Bottle
  4. Strathspeys
- The Orient, fantasies
  1. Javanese (Pepper Dance) [also titled Procession at Batavia, assigned as Op.77 and Op.80, incorporated into Piano Concerto No.2, L'Orient, Op.100]
  2. Burmese (Sacrifice of Water Buffaloes) [originally assigned as Op.81, incorporated into Piano Concerto No.2, L'Orient, Op.100]
  3. Singhalese (Dancing) [originally assigned as Op.82, incorporated into Piano Concerto No.2, L'Orient, Op.100]
  4. Sumatrese [originally assigned as Op.83 ]
  5. Siamese [originally assigned as Op.84 ]
- Barrage, Op.78a (1920)
- The Shaving of Shagpat, suite, Op.78b (1920)
  1. The Palace of Aklis
  2. Dance of Bagarag
  3. Dance of Gladness
- Talsarnau, concert valse, Op. 79 (1920)
- Dolgellau [Cambrian Ballad No.1], Op.80 (early 1920s)
- Penmachno [Cambrian Ballad No.2], Op.81 (early 1920s)
- Tan-y-Grisiau [Cambrian Ballad No.3], Op.82 (early 1920s)
- Memories of Trinidad, Op.86b (c.1920)
  1. Buying a buggy
  2. Dry grassfire
  3. Oh me toad oh
  4. David Logan
- Bogey Beasts, Op.89a (1923) [also includes a song, The Ta-Ta, as a final number]
  1. The Caush
  2. The Seekim
  3. The Wily Grasser
  4. The Gorobobble
  5. The Oop Oop
  6. The Zoom
  7. The Nunk
  8. The Two-Tailed Sogg
  9. The Iffysaurus
  10. The Snide
  11. The Pst
  12. The Moonijim
  13. The Snaitch
  14. The Prapsnot
- Eldorado, suite, Op.102b
  1. Dreamland [also titled Caradoc's Lament]
  2. Eldorado
  3. Bridal Ballad
- The Lake, suite, Op.102c
  1. A Dream
  2. The Lake
  3. The River
  4. The Coliseum
- Maentrog [Cambrian Ballad No.4], Op.104 (1920s) [originally assigned as Op.88 ]
- Eight Nocturnes, Op.121 (1939)
  1. Gulnare [based on music from the poem for orchestra The Viking, Op.32]
  2. Donegal [based on music from the Piano Quartet No.1 in G minor, Op.21]
  3. Juliet [based on music from the poem for chorus and orchestra Queen Mab, Op.45]
  4. Elan [based on music from the opera Dylan, Op.53]
  5. Bridal Ballad [taken from Eldorado, suite for piano, Op.102b ]
  6. Bronwen [based on music from the opera Bronwen, Op.75]
  7. Ariel
  8. Ulalume [based on music from the poem for orchestra Ulalume, Op.35]
- Fantasie-Sonata No.1, The Haunted Palace, Op.124 (late 1930s) [based on music from the Dramatic Choral Symphony Homage to E.A. Poe, Op.48 ]
- Fantasie-Sonata No.2, Destiny, Op.128b (late 1930s) [also titled The Man of the Crowd, also titled Vulcan ]

== Organ ==
- Grand Prelude and Fugue, Op.63 (1917) [the fugue subject using a principal theme from the operatic trilogy The Cauldron of Annwn, originally published under the pseudonym Jean Hanze]
- Suite No.1 in B♭, Op.111 (1930s)
  1. Tragic March
  2. Wedding March
  3. Funeral March
  4. Toccata
- Nocturne, Op.116c
- Suite No.2, Op.122 (1930s)
  1. Bridal March
  2. La Lune, nocturne
  3. Tragic March
  4. Irish Song
- Suite No.3, Op.128a (1930s)
  1. Chorale
  2. Regrets
  3. Vision (Ullapool)
  4. Devotion
  5. Bridal March at Ballybogey

== Choral music ==
- Hymn Tunes and Anthems, Op.1
  1. O Day of Rest and Gladness
  2. March to the Master's Bidding
  3. We are Children
  4. Hear My Voice, O God
  5. Now When Jesus
  6. Hear, O My People
  7. Now Thank We All Our God
- Six Choral Songs, Op.9
  1. Spring is Cheery [SATB]
  2. She's Up and Gone [SATB]
  3. I Will Woo the Rose [SATTB]
  4. Gentle Spring [SSA]
  5. Woodlark [SSA]
  6. Thro' Groves Sequestered [SSATB]
- Eight Choral Songs, Op.16b
  1. The Labourer's Song [SATB]
  2. Some Folks [SSAA]
  3. The Wanderers [SSAA]
  4. In Fairyland [TTBB, originally assigned as Op.47 No.4 ]
  5. The Hour [SATB]
  6. Rag and Bone Man [SSA]
  7. Battle Psalm [TTBB]
  8. In London Town [unison]
- National March, for chorus and orchestra, Op.26a (1902, revised 1909) [originally assigned as Op.52b, later assigned as Op.23b, also titled Triumphal March ]
- Heaven and Earth, dramatic cantata (c.1904) [originally assigned as Op.55, possibly unfinished, no longer extant ]
- Byron, for chorus and orchestra [Poem No.4], Op.39 (1904) [originally styled Poem No.6, originally titled Ode to Byron ]
- Queen Mab, for chorus and orchestra [Poem No.5], Op.45 (1902) [originally styled Poem No.7 ]
- Eight Choral Songs, Op.47
  1. Footsteps of Angels [SATB]
  2. To Zante [SSATTB]
  3. Jean Richepin's Song [TTBB]
  4. To Thee, Wales [SATB]
  5. Tomlinson [SSA, also titled The Shirker ]
  6. Captain Wattle [TTBB]
  7. Drink the Swizzy [TTBB]
  8. Now, all is Well [SATB]
- Homage to E.A. Poe, dramatic choral symphony, for soprano, alto, tenor and bass soli, chorus and orchestra, Op.48 (1902–06, revised 1908) [also styled Symphony No.1 ]
  1. The Haunted Palace
  2. Hymn to the Virgin
  3. The City in the Sea
  4. The Valley Nis
- The Bells, for chorus and orchestra [Poem No.6], Op.50 (1903) [originally styled Poem No.9 ]
  1. Prelude
  2. Sledge Bells
  3. Wedding Bells
  4. Alarm Bells
  5. Iron Bells
- Apollo and the Seaman, dramatic symphony [Symphony No.2], for male chorus and orchestra, Op.51 (1907)
  1. Apollo's Coming; The Rumour; The Ship
  2. The Tidings
  3. The Tale of Apollo; The Rebuke
  4. The New Ship; The Embarkation
- Psalms of David, for chorus and orchestra (c.1928-1930) [originally assigned as Op.101, possibly unfinished and no longer extant ]
- Choral Songs, Op.108
  1. England [SATB]
  2. Laugh and be Merry [SATB]
- Choral Songs, Op.113
  1. The Rolling English Road [SATB]
  2. Wine and Water [SATB]
  3. Hymn before action [SATB or unison]
- Blake, choral symphony (1930s) [originally assigned as Op.122, unfinished]
- Songs of Innocence, Op.130a (1934–36) [related to Blake, unfinished choral symphony (1930s), see also under Songs]
  1. Spring [SSA]
  2. The Blossom [SAT]
  3. The Divine Image [TTBB]
  4. Another's Sorrow [SSAATTBB]
- Hear the Bard, Op.130b (c.1934) [SATBarB, from Blake, unfinished choral symphony (1930s) ]
- Milton, choral symphony [Symphony No.9], Op.131 (1938–46) [possibly unfinished ]

== Songs ==
- Seven Songs, for voice and piano, Op.7
  1. Fair Phyllis
  2. Wild Rose
  3. Love Symphony [also scored for orchestra ]
  4. I Cannot Tell
  5. Golden Daffodils
  6. There's a Garden
  7. Moonshine
- Six Songs, for voice and piano, Op.11
  1. Summer Sweet
  2. Bonnie Dear
  3. Tulip's Wooing
  4. Sheila
  5. Honor Bright
  6. Grant Us Thy Peace
- Eight Songs, for voice and piano, Op.13
  1. Love Foregone
  2. Goodmorrow
  3. Where's Mother?
  4. I Came at Morn
  5. We are Violets
  6. Love's Answer
  7. Sailor's Bride
  8. You are Love
- Bohemian Songs, for baritone and orchestra, Op.14 (1898–1904)
  1. Unto My Foe
  2. Liberty
  3. Ere your beauty
  4. Story of a Drum
  5. A Free Lance
  6. Twenty Years Ago
- Five Songs, for voice and piano, Op.15a
  1. In Sunshine Clad
  2. A Voice
  3. A Winter Night
  4. The Sea Hath Pearls
  5. Autumn
- Six Characteristic Songs, for voice and piano, Op.22
  1. Sympathy
  2. Battle Song
  3. Tag and Bobtail
  4. Follow the Gleam
  5. Come to the West
  6. Seawards
- Six Lyrical Songs, for voice and piano, Op.24
  1. Tho' all the stars
  2. Love and I
  3. They love indeed
  4. A Fairy
  5. To Dianeme
  6. Night and Day
- Six Dramatic Songs, for voice and piano, Op.29
  1. Come, let us make love deathless [also scored for orchestra ]
  2. I heard a soldier
  3. My own sad love
  4. O dreamy, gloomy, friendly trees
  5. The Requital
  6. Dark, dark the seas
- Six Romantic Songs, for voice and piano, Op.30
  1. A Lake and a Fairy Boat
  2. To My Wife
  3. Come not when I am dead [also scored for string quartet ]
  4. A Farewell
  5. To a Cold Lover
  6. The Stars
- Six Landscapes, for voice and piano, Op.34
  1. Along the Path
  2. The Shadows
  3. High Noon
  4. Grey Evening
  5. Night
  6. Stay, my love
- Marino Faliero, scena for bass or baritone and orchestra, Op.41a (1905) [also assigned as Op.41b ]
- Annabel Lee, ballade for baritone or tenor and orchestra Op.41b (1905) [also assigned as Op.41a ]
- Five Songs, for voice and piano, Op.54
  1. Killary (1909) [also scored for small orchestra, also scored for string quartet ]
  2. An Outsong
  3. Where be you going?
  4. Think not of me
  5. My Jean
- Garden of Irem [originally included additionally in Songs, Op.54 ]
- Five Dramatic Songs, for voice and piano, Op.69
  1. Bronwen's Song [from the opera Bronwen, Op.75]
  2. The Coward's Exit
  3. Come not when I am dead [also included in Six Romantic Songs, Op.30]
  4. Clown's Song (1921)
  5. Bacchus (1921)
- Six Songs, for voice and piano, Op.74
  1. Taliessin's Song (1920) [with clarinet obbligato, from the opera Bronwen, Op.75]
  2. The Price (1922)
  3. Dolly (1922)
  4. Homeland (1924) [also titled England, with oboe obbligato]
  5. The Old School (1923)
  6. The Bathers [with flute obbligato] (1923)
- Three Songs, for voice and string quartet, Op.76
  1. Music Comes
  2. Pack clouds away
  3. The Bells of Heaven
- Six Socialist Songs, for voice and piano, Op.77 (1919–23)
  1. Salutation [with oboe and viola obbligati]
  2. The Garret
  3. The East Wind
  4. The Tea Shop Girl [with clarinet obbligato]
  5. The Tame Cat [with clarinet obbligato]
  6. Face Your Game
- The Ta-Ta, for voice and piano, Op.89 No.15 [final number of Bogey Beasts, Op.89 (1923) for piano]
- Twelve Drinking Songs, for voice and piano, Op.92 [also titled Twelve Sporting Songs ]
  1. The Cocktail
  2. Saint George
  3. The Newest Music
  4. The Wicked Grocer
  5. The Song of Stout
  6. Tinker, Tailor
  7. The Saracen's Head
  8. The Folks in Liverpool
  9. Jolly Good Ale
  10. The God in the Barley
  11. Labour in Vain
  12. Song against Songs
- Six Songs, for voice and piano, Op.97 (c.1928-29)
  1. Love the Leveller
  2. Gold
  3. In an Almond Tree
  4. If birds can soar
  5. Triolets
  6. Seedtime and Harvest
- Six Songs, for voice and piano, Op.98 (c.1929-30)
  1. More Sweet
  2. The Hill
  3. O Life
  4. My Senses
  5. The Forbidden Vision
  6. The Motor Bus
- Let there be light, for voice and piano, Op.109b
- Songs of Innocence, for voice and piano, Op.130a (1934–36) [related to Blake, unfinished choral symphony (1930s), see also under Choral music]
  1. Piping Down the Valleys
  2. Echoing Green
  3. The Lamb
  4. The Shepherd
  5. Infant Joy
  6. The Blackboy
  7. Laughing Song
  8. Cradle Song
  9. Nurse's Song
  10. Holy Thursday
  11. The Chimney Sweeper
  12. Night
  13. A Dream
  14. Little Boy Lost
- Last Two Songs, for voice and piano (c.1954)
  1. Beauty's daughters
  2. Oh, lovely Haidee
