= List of compositions by Cécile Chaminade =

The following is a complete list of extant original compositions by Cécile Chaminade.

All works are for one piano, two hands, unless otherwise stated.

The W numbers are taken from Citron (1988).

== Works with opus number ==
The table is ordered as follows: Opus No. – Title – Publisher – Date of composition or publication.

Opus No.	W No.	Title	Instrumentation	Notes	Publisher	Date
Op.1		Deux Mazurkas	Piano		Colombier	1869
Op.1a		Étude Printanière [Première Étude]	Piano		J. Maho	1876
Op.2		Presto (Deuxième Étude)	Piano		Hamelle	1878
Op.3		Scherzo-Étude (Troisième Étude)	Piano		Hamelle	1880
Op.4		Caprice-Étude (Quatrième Étude)	Piano		Hamelle	1878
Op.5		Menuet	Piano		Hamelle	1878
Op.5a		Idem for orchestra	Orchestra		(Unpublished)	
Op.6		Berceuse			Hamelle	1878
Op.7		Barcarolle			Hamelle	1880
Op.8		Chaconne			Hamelle	1880
Op.9		Pièce Romantique et Gavotte			Durand	1880
Op.10		Scherzando			Durand	1880
Op. 11		Piano Trio No.1 in G minor	Piano, violin, cello		Durand	1880
Op. 12		Pastorale Enfantine for two pianos			Hamelle	1885
Op. 12a		Idem for solo piano	Piano		Enoch	1897
Op. 13		Les Noces d'Argent. Fantaisie très facile pour un seul piano à 8 mains	Piano		Enoch	1897
Op. 13a		Idem for solo piano	Piano		Enoch	1907
Op. 14		[Missing]				
Op. 15		[Missing]				
Op. 16		[Missing]				
Op. 17		[Missing]				
Op. 18		Capriccio	Violin and Piano		Enoch	1890
Op. 18a		Idem for Solo Piano	Piano		Enoch	1912
Op. 19		La Sévillane (Opéra comique in one act)			(Unpublished)	1892
Op. 19a		La Sévillane [overture] for piano	Piano		Enoch	1889
Op. 19b		La Sévillane [overture] for two pianos	Two Pianos		Enoch	1891
Op. 20		Suite d'Orchestre: 1. Marche (G minor); 2. Intermezzo (A flat major); 3. Scherzo (B minor); 4. Choral (D major)	Orchestra		L. Grus	1881
Op. 20a		Idem for two pianos	Two Pianos		L. Grus	1881
Op. 20b		Idem for piano: 1. Marche-Impromptu; 2. Pas des Sylphes; 3. Colombine; 4. Les Noces d'Or	Piano		Hanchette	1907-1908
Op. 21		Piano Sonata in C minor	Piano		Enoch	1893
Op. 22		Orientale			Hamelle	1883
Op. 22a		Idem for Orchestra	Orchestra		[Unpublished]	
Op. 23		Minuetto	Piano		Enoch	1883
Op. 24		Libellules	Piano		Enoch	1881
Op. 25		Deux Morceaux: 1. Mélancolie; 2. Humoresque	Piano		Adolphe Fürstner	1885
Op. 26		Les Amazones (Symphonie Dramatique)	Orchestra, Chorus, and SATB soloists		Enoch	1884
Op. 27		Deux Morceaux: 1. Duetto; 2. Zingara	Piano		Hainauer	1885
Op. 27a		Zingara	Orchestra		[Unpublished]	
Op. 28		Étude Symphonique	Piano		Hamelle	1884
Op. 29		Sérénade	Piano		Enoch	1884
Op. 29a		Sérénade	Orchestra	Version for orchestra of Op.29	Unpublished	
Op. 30		[Premier] Air de Ballet			Enoch	1884
Op. 31		Trois Morceaux: 1. Andantino; 2. Romanza; 3. Bohémienne	Violin and Piano		Hainauer	1885
Op. 31a		Romanza	Cello and Piano		unpublished	
Op. 32		Guitare			Enoch	1885
Op. 33		Valse-Caprice [Première Valse]			Enoch	1885
Op. 34		Piano Trio No. 2 in A minor	Piano, Violin, Cello		Enoch	1886
Op. 35		Six Études de Concert: 1. Scherzo; 2. Automne; 3. Fileuse; 4. Appassionato; 5. Impromptu; 6. Tarentelle	Piano		Enoch	1886
Op. 35a		Automne	Piano duet		Enoch	1924
Op. 35b		Tarentelle	Orchestra		unpublished	
Op. 36		Deux Pièces: 1. Intermède; 2. Pas des Cymbales [from Callirhoë]	Two Pianos		Enoch	1886
Op. 36a		idem	Piano duet		Enoch	1887
Op. 37		Callirhoë. Ballet symphonique	Orchestra		unpublished	1888
Op. 37a		Callirhoë. Suite d'Orchestre: 1. Prélude; 2. Pas du Voile; 3. Scherzettino; 4. Pas des Cymbales	Orchestra		Enoch	1890

  - Op. 37b Cinq Airs de Ballet [from Callirhoë] (Enoch) 1888
  1. Pas des Amphores (Deuxième Air de Ballet)
  2. Pas des Écharpes (Troisième Air de Ballet)
  3. Callirhoë (Variation) (Quatrième Air de Ballet)
  4. Danse Pastorale (Cinquième Air de Ballet)
  5. Danse Orientale
  - Op. 37c Deux Airs de Ballet [from Callirhoë] for piano duet (Enoch) 1888
  1. Danse Orientale
  2. Danse Pastorale
- Op. 38 Marine (Enoch) 1886
- Op. 39 Toccata (Enoch) 1887
- Op. 40 Concertstück in C sharp minor for piano and orchestra (Enoch) 1888
- Op. 41 Pierrette. Air de Ballet (Enoch) 1889
- Op. 42 Les Willis. Caprice (Enoch) 1889
- Op. 43 Gigue (Enoch) 1889
- Op. 44 Les Feux de la Saint-Jean for soloists, women's chorus and piano (Enoch) 1890
- Op. 45 Sous l'Aile Blanche des Voiles for soloists, women's chorus and piano (Enoch) 1890
- Op. 46 Pardon Breton for soloists, women's chorus and piano (Enoch) 1890
- Op. 47 Noce Hongroise for soloists, women's chorus and piano (Enoch) 1890
- Op. 48 Noël des Marins for soloists, women's chorus and piano (Enoch) 1890
- Op. 49 Les Filles d'Arles for soloists, women's chorus and piano (Enoch) 1890
- Op. 50 La Lisonjera (L'Enjôleuse) (Ricordi) 1890
- Op. 51 La Livry. Air de Ballet (Ricordi) 1890
- Op. 52 Capriccio Appassionato (Ricordi) 1890
- Op. 53 Arlequine (Ricordi) 1890
- Op. 54 Lolita. Caprice espagnol (Enoch) 1890
- Op. 55 Pièces Romantiques for piano duet (Enoch) 1890
  1. Primavera
  2. La Chaise à Porteurs
  3. Idylle Arabe
  4. Sérénade d'Automne
  5. Danse Hindoue
  6. Rigaudon
  - Op. 55a La Chaise à Porteurs for violin and piano (Enoch) 1896
  - Op. 55b La Chaise à Porteurs for cello and piano (Enoch) 1896
  - Op. 55c Pièces Romantiques for piano solo (Enoch) 1923
  1. Idylle arabe
  2. Danse Hindoue
  3. Rigaudon
  - Op. 55d Pièces Romantiques for orchestra (unpublished)
  1. La Chaise à Porteurs
  2. Idylle arabe
  3. Sérénade d'Automne
- Op. 56 Scaramouche (Enoch) 1890
- Op. 57 Havanaise (Enoch) 1891
- Op. 58 Mazurk' Suédoise (Enoch) 1891
- Op. 59 Andante et Scherzettino [from Callirhoë] for 2 pianos (Enoch) 1889
  - Op. 59a idem for piano (Enoch) 1913
- Op. 60 Les Sylvains (Enoch) 1892
  - Op. 60a idem for violin and piano (Enoch) 1923
- Op. 61 Arabesque (Enoch) 1892
- Op. 62 Barcarolle for 2 voices and piano (Enoch) 1892
- Op. 63 À travers Bois for 2 voices and piano (Enoch) 1892
- Op. 64 Marthe et Marie for 2 voices and piano (Enoch) 1893
- Op. 65 Nocturne pyrénéen for 2 voices and piano (Enoch) 1892
- Op. 66 Studio (Enoch) 1878
- Op. 67 La Morena. Caprice espagnol (Enoch) 1892
- Op. 68 Les Fiancés for 2 voices and piano (Enoch) 1892
- Op. 69 L'Angélus for 2 voices and piano (Enoch) 1893
- Op. 70 Le Pêcheur et l'Ondine for 2 voices and piano (Enoch) 1893
- Op. 71 Duo d'Étoiles for 2 voices and piano (Enoch) 1892
- Op. 72 [missing]
- Op. 73 Valse Carnavalesque for 2 pianos (Enoch) 1894
- Op. 74 Pièce dans le Style Ancien (Enoch) 1893
  - Op. 74a idem for piano duet (Enoch) 1893
  - Op. 74b idem for violin and piano (Enoch) 1925
- Op. 75 Danse Ancienne (Enoch) 1893
- Op. 76 Six Romances sans Paroles (Enoch) 1893
  1. Souvenance
  2. Élévation
  3. Idylle
  4. Églogue
  5. Chanson Bretonne
  6. Méditation
  - Op. 76a idem for piano duet (Enoch) 1923
  - Op. 76b Chanson Bretonne for violin and piano (Enoch) 1924
- Op. 77 Deuxième Valse (Enoch) 1895
- Op. 78 Prélude for organ (Enoch) 1895
  - Op. 78a idem for piano (Enoch) 1895
- Op. 79 Deux Pièces pour Orchestre (Enoch) 1895
  1. Le Matin
  2. Le Soir
  - Op. 79a idem for 2 pianos (Enoch) 1895
  - Op. 79b Le Matin for piano solo (Enoch) 1911
  - Op. 79c Le Matin for piano duet (Enoch) 1923
  - Op. 79d Le Matin for violin and piano (Enoch) 1925
- Op. 80 Troisième Valse Brillante (Enoch) 1898
- Op. 81 Terpsichore. Sixième Air de Ballet (Enoch) 1896
- Op. 82 Chanson Napolitaine (Enoch) 1896
- Op. 83 Ritournelle [after song] (Enoch) 1892
  - Op. 83a idem for piano duet (Enoch) 1897
  - Op. 83b idem for violin and piano (Enoch) 1903
  - Op. 83c idem for piano (Enoch) 1903
  - Op. 83d idem for piano very easy (Enoch) 1897
- Op. 84 Trois Préludes Mélodiques (Enoch) 1896
  1. A minor
  2. F major
  3. D minor
- Op. 85 Vert-Galant (Enoch) 1896
- Op. 86 Ballade (Enoch) 1896
- Op. 87 Six Pièces Humoristiques (Enoch) 1897
  1. Réveil
  2. Sous Bois
  3. Inquiétude
  4. Autrefois
  5. Consolation
  6. Norvégienne
- Op. 88 Rimembranza (Enoch) 1898
  - Op. 88a idem for piano duet (Enoch) 1923
- Op. 89 Thème Varié (Enoch) 1898
- Op. 90 Légende (Enoch) 1898
- Op. 91 Quatrième Valse (Enoch) 1901
  - Op. 91a idem for piano duet (Enoch) 1923
- Op. 92 Deuxième Arabesque (Enoch) 1898
- Op. 93 Valse Humoristique (Enoch) 1906
- Op. 94 Danse Créole (Deuxième Havanaise) (Enoch) 1898
  - Op. 94a idem for piano duet (Enoch) 1925
- Op. 95 Trois Danses Anciennes (Enoch) 1899
  1. Passepied
  2. Pavane
  3. Courante
  - Op. 95a Pavane for piano duet (Enoch) 1899
- Op. 96 Chant du Nord for violin and piano (Enoch) 1899
- Op. 97 Rondeau for violin and piano (Enoch) 1899
- Op. 98 Six Feuillets d'Album (Enoch) 1900
  1. Promenade
  2. Scherzetto
  3. Élégie
  4. Valse Arabesque
  5. Chanson Russe
  6. Rondo Allègre
- Op. 99 Poèmes Évangéliques for women's chorus and piano (Enoch) 1903
  1. L'Étoile
  2. Les Humbles
  3. Les Pêcheurs
  4. La Jeune Fille
  5. Les Petits Enfants
  6. Sainte-Magdeleine
- Op. 100 Aux Dieux Sylvains for women's chorus and piano (Enoch) 1900
- Op. 101 L'Ondine (Enoch) 1900
  - Op. 101a idem for piano duet (Enoch) 1900
- Op. 102 Joie d'Aimer for mezzo-soprano, baritone and piano (Enoch) 1900
- Op. 103 Moment Musical (Enoch) 1900
  - Op. 103a idem for piano duet (Enoch) 1923
- Op. 104 Tristesse (Enoch) 1901
- Op. 105 Divertissement (Enoch) 1901
- Op. 106 Expansion (Enoch) 1901
- Op. 107 Concertino in D major for flute and orchestra (Enoch) 1902
  - Op. 107a idem for flute and piano (Enoch) 1902
- Op. 108 Agitato (Enoch) 1902
- Op. 109 Valse Militaire (Cinquième Valse) (Enoch) 1902
  - Op. 109a idem for piano duet (Enoch) 1902
- Op. 110 Novelette (Enoch) 1903
- Op. 111 Souvenirs Lointains (Enoch) 1903
- Op. 112 Valse-Ballet (Sixième Valse) (Enoch) 1904
- Op. 113 Caprice Humoristique (Enoch) 1904
- Op. 114 Pastorale (Enoch) 1904
- Op. 115 Valse Romantique (Septième Valse) (Enoch) 1905
  - Op. 115a idem for piano duet (Enoch) 1924
- Op. 116 Sous le Masque (Enoch) 1905
- Op. 117 Duo Symphonique for 2 pianos (Enoch) 1905
- Op. 118 Étude Mélodique (Enoch) 1906
- Op. 119 Valse Tendre (Enoch) 1906
- Op. 120 Variations sur un Thème Original (Enoch) 1906
- Op. 121 Deuxième Gavotte (Enoch) 1906
  - Op. 121a idem for piano duet (Enoch) 1906
- Op. 122 Contes Bleus (Enoch) 1906
  1. D major
  2. G major
  3. B minor
  - Op. 122a Contes Bleus No.2 for piano duet (Enoch) 1923
- Op. 123 Album des Enfants (première série) (Enoch) 1906
  1. Prélude
  2. Intermezzo
  3. Canzonetta
  4. Rondeau
  5. Gavotte
  6. Gigue
  7. Romance
  8. Barcarolle
  9. Orientale
  10. Tarentelle
  11. Air de Ballet
  12. Marche Russe
- Op. 124 Étude Pathétique (Enoch) 1906
- Op. 125 Sommeil d'Enfant for cello and piano [after song] (Enoch) 1907
- Op. 126 Album des Enfants (deuxième série) (Enoch) 1907
  1. Idylle
  2. Aubade
  3. Rigaudon
  4. Églogue
  5. Ballade
  6. Scherzo-Valse
  7. Élégie
  8. Novelette
  9. Patrouille
  10. Villanelle
  11. Conte de Fées
  12. Valse Mignonne
- Op. 127 Poèmes provençaux (Enoch) 1908
  1. Dans la Lande
  2. Solitude
  3. Le Passé
  4. Les Pêcheurs de Nuit
- Op. 128 Pastel (Enoch) 1908
- Op. 129 Menuet Galant (Enoch)1909
- Op. 130 Passacaille (Enoch) 1909
- Op. 131 Marche Américaine (Enoch) 1909
- Op. 132 Étude Romantique (Enoch) 1909
- Op. 133 Ronde du Crépuscule for soloists and women's chorus (Enoch) 1909
- Op. 134 Le Retour (Enoch) 1909
- Op. 135 La Barque d'Amour (Enoch) 1910
- Op. 136 Capricietto (Enoch) 1910
- Op. 137 Romance en Ré (Enoch) 1910
- Op. 138 Étude Humoristique (Enoch) 1910
- Op. 139 Étude Scolastique (Enoch) 1910
- Op. 140 Aubade [after Op126/2] (Enoch) 1911
- Op. 141 Suédoise (Enoch) 1911
- Op. 142 Sérénade aux Étoiles for flute and piano (Enoch) 1911
- Op. 143 Cortège (Enoch) 1911
- Op. 144 Troisième Gavotte [after Op.126/3] (Enoch) 1911
- Op. 145 Scherzo-Caprice (Enoch) 1912
- Op. 146 Feuilles d'Automne (Enoch) 1912
- Op. 147 Les Bohémiens. Scènes de Ballet (Enoch) 1913
- Op. 148 Scherzo-Valse [after Op.126/6] (Enoch) 1913
- Op. 149 Quatrième Gavotte (Enoch) 1913
- Op. 150 Sérénade Espagnole [after song "Chanson espagnole"] (Enoch) 1895
  - Op. 150a idem for piano duet (Enoch) 1895
- Op. 151 Écossaise (Enoch) 1914
- Op. 152 Interlude (Enoch) 1914
  - Op. 152a idem for piano duet (Enoch) 1925
- Op. 153 Caprice-Impromptu (Enoch) 1914
- Op. 154 Sérénade Vénitienne (Enoch) 1914
- Op. 155 Au Pays Dévasté (Enoch) 1919
- Op. 156 Berceuse du Petit Soldat Blessé (Enoch) 1919
- Op. 157 Chanson d'Orient (Enoch) 1919
- Op. 158 Danse Païenne (Enoch) 1919
- Op. 159 Les Elfes des Bois for soloists, women's chorus and piano (Enoch) 1920
- Op. 160 Les Sirènes for soloists, mixed chorus and piano (Enoch) 1920
- Op. 161 Chanson Nègre (Enoch) 1921
- Op. 162 Cinquième Gavotte (Enoch) 1921
- Op. 163 Romanesca (Enoch) 1923
- Op. 164 Air à Danser (Enoch) 1923
- Op. 165 Nocturne (Enoch) 1925
- Op. 166 Berceuse Arabe (Enoch) 1925
- Op. 167 Mass for two equal voices and organ or harmonium (Enoch) 1927
- Op. 168 Dans l'Arène (Enoch) 1928
- Op. 169 Valse d'Automne (Enoch) 1928
- Op. 170 Air Italien (Au Pays Bleu) [after song] (Enoch) 1928
- Op. 171 La Nef Sacrée. Recueil de pièces pour orgue ou harmonium (Enoch) 1928
  1. Offertoire (Au Christ-Roi)
  2. Offertoire (ou Communion)
  3. Offertoire (La Madone)
  4. Offertoire (Le 2 Novembre)
  5. Offertoire (pour une Messe de Mariage)
  6. Offertoire (pour la Toussaint)
  7. Quatre Pastorales (pour la Messe de Minuit)
  8. Marche Funèbre
  9. Cortège Nuptial

== Works without opus number ==
=== Chamber ===
- Andante, WU2 for violin and piano (unpublished) 1884
- Andante Tranquillo, WU3 for violin and piano (unpublished) 1884
- Concerto-Légende, WU10 for violin and piano (unpublished)
- Portrait (Valse Chantée), W366b [after song] for violin and piano (Enoch) 1911

=== Orchestral ===
- Les Deux Ménétriers, WU11 for baritone and orchestra (unpublished)
- L'Été, WU14 for voice and orchestra (unpublished)

=== Songs for voice and piano ===
- L'Absente, W271 (Enoch) 1886
- À l'Inconnue, W288 (Enoch) 1892
- L'Allée d'Émeraude et d'Or, W346 (Enoch) 1900
- Alléluia, W357 (Enoch) 1901
- Amertume, W333 (Enoch) 1898
- Amoroso, W283 (Enoch) 1891
- L'Amour Captif, W292 (Enoch) 1893
- Amour d'Automne, W276 (Enoch) 1889
- Amour Invisible, W376 (Enoch) 1905
- L'Anneau d'Argent, W284 (Enoch) 1891
- L'Anneau du Soldat, W392 (Enoch) 1916
- Attente (Au Pays de Provence), W387 (Enoch) 1914
- Aubade, W309 (Henri Tellier) 1894
- Au Firmament, W352 (Enoch) 1901
- Au Pays Bleu, W332 (Enoch) 1898
- Auprès de ma Mie, W268 (Enoch) 1888
- Avenir, W375 (Enoch) 1905
- Avril s'Éveille, W323 (Enoch) 1896
- Ballade à la Lune, W304 (Henri Tellier) 1894
- Ballade à la Terre, WU5 (unpublished)
- Le Beau Chanteur, W342 (Enoch) 1900
- Berceuse, W287 (Enoch) 1892
- Bleus, W328 (Enoch) 1898
- Bonne Humeur, W363 (Enoch) 1903
- C'était en Avril, W345 (Enoch) 1900
- Chanson de Mer, W388 (Enoch) 1914
- Chanson de Neige, W380 (Enoch) 1906
- La Chanson du Fou, W335 (Hamelle) 1878
- Chanson Espagnole, W315 (Enoch) 1895
- Chanson Forestière, W367 (Enoch) 1904
- Chanson Groënlandaise, W300 (Henri Tellier) 1894
- Chanson Naïve, W381 (Enoch) 1907
- Chanson Slave, W262 (Album du Gaulois) 1880
- Chanson Triste, W329 (Enoch) 1898
- Chant d'Amour, W305 (Henri Tellier) 1894
- Charme d'Amour, W351 (Enoch) 1900
- Le Ciel est Bleu, W320 (Enoch) 1895
- Colette, W285 (Enoch) 1891
- Console-moi, W348 (Enoch) 1900
- Conte de Fées, W349 (Enoch) 1900
- Couplets Bachiques, W325 (Enoch) 1896
- La Damoiselle, W350 (Enoch) 1900
- Départ, W369 (Enoch) 1904
- Les Deux Cœurs (Chanson Bretonne), W295 (Enoch) 1893
- Les Deux Ménétriers, W277 (Enoch) 1890
- Dites-lui, W372 (Enoch) 1905
- Écrin, W359 (Enoch) 1902
- Espoir, W317 (Enoch) 1895
- L'Été, W303 (Henri Tellier) 1894
- Exil (Chanson Ancienne), W365 (Enoch) 1904
- Extase, W343 (Enoch) 1900
- La Fiancée du Soldat, W267 (Enoch) 1887
- Fleur du Matin, W322 (Enoch) 1896
- Fleur Jetée, W275 (Enoch) 1889
- Fragilité, W274 (Enoch) 1889
- L'Heure du Mystère, W257 (J. Maho) 1878
- Les Heureuses, W382 (Enoch) 1909
- L'Idéal, W269 (Enoch) 1888
- Immortalité, W336 (Enoch) 1899
- Infini, W360 (Enoch) 1902
- Invocation, W291 (Enoch) 1893
- Jadis, W337 (Enoch) 1899
- Je Voudrais, W386 (Enoch) 1912
- Lettres d'Amour, W383 (Enoch) 1910
- La Lune Paresseuse, W377 (Enoch) 1905
- Madeleine, W263 (Enoch) 1880
- Madrigal, W266 (Enoch) 1886
- Malgré Nous, W294 (Enoch) 1893
- Mandoline, W319 (Enoch) 1895
- Ma Première Lettre, W293 (Enoch) 1893
- Menuet, W368 (Enoch) 1904
- Mignonne, W302 (Henri Tellier) 1894
- Mirage, W358 (Enoch) 1902
- Mon Cœur Chante, W321 (Enoch) 1896
- Mots d'Amour, W331 (Enoch) 1898
- Ne Nos Inducas In Tentationem, WU21 (unpublished) 1878
- N'est-ce pas?, W370 (Enoch) 1904
- Nice la Belle, W273 (Enoch) 1889
- Ninette, W258 (J. Maho) 1878
- Le Noël des Oiseaux, W297 (Enoch) 1893
- Nous nous Aimions, W344 (Enoch) 1900
- Nuit d'Été, W326 (Enoch) 1896
- Nuit Étoilée, W341 (Enoch) 1899
- L'Ondine du Léman, W384 (Enoch) 1910
- L'Orgue, W355 (Enoch) 1901
- O Salutaris, WU22 for voice, violin and organ (unpublished)
- Les Papillons, W259 (J. Maho) 1878
- Partout, W316 (Enoch) 1895
- Petits Cœurs, W347 (Enoch) 1900
- Pièce Romantique, W327 [after Op. 9/1] (Durand) 1897
- Plaintes d'Amour, W281 (Enoch) 1891
- La plus Jolie, W354 (Enoch) 1901
- Portrait (Valse Chantée), W366 for voice, flute and piano (Enoch) 1904
- Pourquoi, W356 (Enoch) 1901
- Les Présents, W330 (Enoch) 1898
- Râvana (Ballade Aryenne), W312 (Enoch) 1895
- Refrain de Novembre, W364 (Enoch) 1903
- La Reine de mon Cœur, W378 (Enoch) 1905
- Le Rendez-vous, W289 (Enoch) 1892
- Ressemblance, W310 (Enoch) 1895
- Reste, W338 (Enoch) 1899
- Rêve d'un Soir, W278 (Enoch) 1890
- Les Rêves, W280 (Enoch) 1891
- Rêves défunts, W340 (Enoch) 1899
- Ritournelle, W265 (Enoch) 1886
- Ronde d'Amour, W311 (Enoch) 1895
- Rosemonde, W298 (Henri Tellier) 1878
- Roulis des Grèves, W361 (Enoch) 1902
- Sans Amour, W318 (Enoch) 1895
- Sérénade Sévillane, W299 (Henri Tellier) 1894
- Serenata, W272 (Enoch) 1888
- Ses Yeux, W374 (Enoch) 1905
- Si j'étais Jardinier, W296 (Enoch) 1893
- Sombrero, W301 (Henri Tellier) 1894
- Sommeil d'Enfant, W362 (Enoch) 1903
- Sonne, Clairon (Marche Militaire), W391 (Enoch) 1915
- Son Nom, W371 (Enoch) 1904
- Un Souffle a Passé, W379 (Enoch) 1906
- Souhait, W264 (Enoch) 1886
- Sous ta Fenêtre, W260 (J. Maho) 1878
- Sur la Plage, W286 (Enoch) 1892
- Te Souviens-tu?, W261 (J. Maho) 1878
- Toi!, W314 (Enoch) 1895
- Ton Sourire, W353 (Enoch) 1901
- Trahison, W308 (Henri Tellier) 1894
- Les Trois Baisers, W339 (Enoch) 1899
- Le Trône du Vieux Roi, W389 (Enoch) 1914
- Tu me Dirais, W282 (Enoch) 1891
- Veux-tu?, W324 (Enoch) 1896
- Viatique, W313 (Enoch) 1895
- Vieille Chanson, W307 (Henri Tellier) 1894
- Viens mon Bien-aimé, W290 (Enoch) 1892
- Vieux Portrait, W279 (Enoch) 1890
- Le Village, W390 (Enoch) 1915
- Villanelle, W306 (Henri Tellier) 1894
- Vœu Suprême, W385 (Enoch) 1910
- Voisinage, W270 (Enoch) 1888
- Voix du Large, W373 (Enoch) 1905
- Vous Souvient-il?, W334 (Hamelle) 1898

=== Piano ===
- La Capricieuse, WU7 (unpublished) c.1935–44
- Comme Autrefois – Le Bon Vieux Temps, WU9 (unpublished) c.1935–44
- La Fiancée du Soldat, W267a [after song] (Enoch) 1912
- Le Gladiateur, WU15 (unpublished)
- Légende du Vieux Manoir, WU18 (unpublished) c.1935–44
- Portrait (Valse Chantée), W366a [after song] (Enoch) 1911
- Souvenirs d'Enfance, WU27 (unpublished)
- Les Tambourinaires. Danse Provençale, WU28 (unpublished)

=== Two pianos ===
- Marche Hongroise, WU19 (unpublished) 1880
