= Florian Uhlig =

Florian Uhlig is a German classical pianist.

Uhlig was born in Düsseldorf, Germany, and gave his first piano recital at the age of twelve. He studied in London at the Royal College of Music and the Royal Academy of Music, finishing with the concert diploma. He was also influenced by working with Peter Feuchtwanger and by his research towards a PhD thesis at the University of London. Florian Uhlig made his orchestral debut at the Barbican Arts Centre in London in 1997. Since then he has performed with orchestras like the BBC Symphony Orchestra, the Beijing Symphony Orchestra, the Deutsche Radio Philharmonie, the Dresden Philharmonic, the Hong Kong Sinfonietta, the Polish Radio Symphony Orchestra, the Simón Bolívar Youth Orchestra of Venezuela, the National Symphony Orchestra of Taiwan, the Bavarian Radio Chamber Orchestra, the Stuttgart Chamber Orchestra and the Vienna Chamber Orchestra. He has worked with conductors Krzysztof Penderecki, Josep Caballé, Claus Peter Flor, Eivind Gullberg Jensen, Kristjan Järvi, Michael Sanderling and Gerard Schwarz.

Florian Uhlig has given concerts at the Beethoven Festivals of Bonn and Warsaw, Lorin Maazel’s Castleton Festival, the Menuhin Festival in Gstaad, the Hong Kong Arts Festival, the Mecklenburg-Vorpommern Festival, France Musique Paris, the Schleswig-Holstein Music Festival, the Schwetzingen Festival and the Vienna Festwochen.

In addition to his solo activities Florian Uhlig is active as a chamber musician and lied accompanist. He was the last partner of the German baritone Hermann Prey.

Uhlig has recorded the complete works for piano and orchestra by Dmitri Shostakovich and Robert Schumann on CD, as well as the complete piano solo works by Maurice Ravel. Since 2010, he has been recording a complete edition of Robert Schumann’s piano solo works, of which 9 volumes have been released so far by Hänssler Classic.

Florian Uhlig has held masterclasses in Germany, Great Britain, Canada, Hong Kong, South Korea, China and Switzerland. He has been the Artistic Director of the Johannesburg International Mozart Festival since 2008 and was appointed Professor of Piano at the Hochschule für Musik Carl Maria von Weber Dresden in 2014.

Florian Uhlig was accorded Associateship of the Royal Academy of Music in London in May 2015.

== Discography ==
- “Schumann: Scenes from Childhood | Novelettes“ Hänssler Classic (98.059), 2015
- “Schumann: Davidsbündler against Philistines“ Hänssler Classic (98.050), 2015
- “Ravel: Complete Solo Piano Works“ Hänssler Classic (93.318), 2014
- “Schumann and the Counterpoint“ Hänssler Classic (98.032), 2013
- “Schumann: Album for the Young“ Hänssler Classic (98.013), 2013
- “Krzysztof Penderecki: Piano Concerto 'Resurrection'“ Hänssler Classic (98.018), 2013
- “Debussy | Poulenc | Françaix | Ravel - Piano Concertos“ Hänssler Classic (93.302), 2013
- “Schumann and his Daughters“ Hänssler Classic (98.011), 2013
- “Schumann in Vienna“ Hänssler Classic (98.650), 2012
- “Schumann: Character Pieces I“ Hänssler Classic (98.646), 2012
- “Schumann: The Young Virtuoso“ Hänssler Classic (98.632), 2011
- “Schumann: Works for Piano and Orchestra“ Hänssler Classic (93.264), 2010
- “Schumann and the Sonata I“ Hänssler Classic (98.603), 2010
- “Beethoven: Variations for Piano“ Hänssler Classic (98.599), 2009
- “Shostakovich: Piano Concertos“ Hänssler Classic (93.113), 2004
- “Johann Nepomuk Hummel: Septets“, ORFEO (C 762 141 A)
- “Hartmann: Concerto for Viola and Piano“ Wergo (WER 6714 2), 2009
- “J.S. Bach: Brandenburg Concerto No.5“ quartz (QTZ2047), 2006
- “Bernard Stevens: Piano Works“ Dutton Epoch (CDLX 7160), 2005
- “Venezia“ Black Box Music (BBM 1054), 2000
