= List of compositions by Henri Herz =

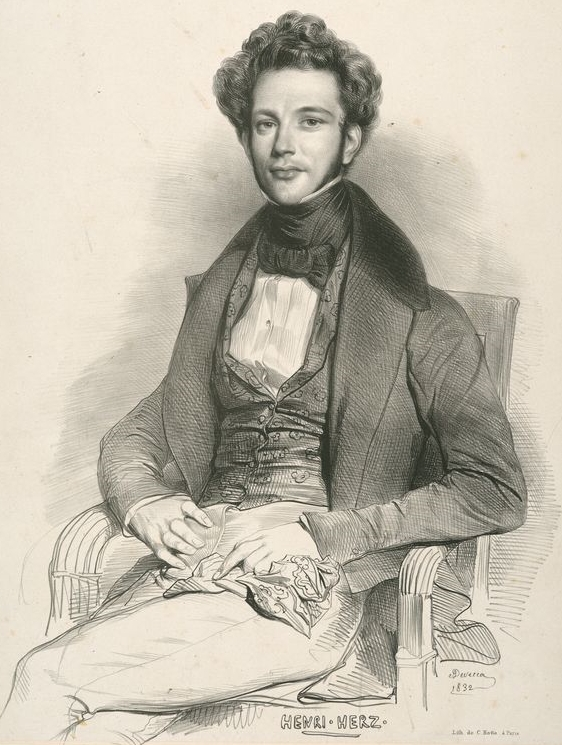
Portrait of Henri Herz in 1832.

This is a list of works by Henri Herz (1803–1888).

== Piano ==
=== Piano Solo ===
- Air Tyrolien varié, Op. 1
- Rondo alla Cosacca, Op. 2
- L'Allemande, Op. 3/1
- L'Anglaise, Op. 3/2
- La Folie, Op. 3/3
- Airs de ballets de l'opéra "Moïse" de Rossini, Op. 3/4
- Allegro et variations faciles composés d'après des motifs de C. de Marexcot, Op. 3/5
- Stabat Mater de G. Rossini : transcrit pour piano solo, Op. 4/1
- Air de basse, Op. 4/2
- Fantasie, Op. 5
- Introduction, Variations & Finale concertants, Op. 7
- Variations avec introduction, Op. 8/1
- Polonaise, Op. 8/2
- Variations et rondeau sur un air allemand favori : pour le piano-forte, Op. 9
- Variations brillantes sur l'air favori "Ma Fanchette est charmante" (Boieldieu), Op. 10
- Grande Fantaisie sur "La Romanesca", Op. 11
- Fantaisie et rondo sur la Cavatine Cara deh attendimi de Zelmire, opéra de Rossini, Op. 12
- Variations sur un air tyrolien favori composées et dédiées à Madlle. Poyferé de Cères, Op. 13
- Rondo Brillante sur un Air Favori de La Geige, Op. 14
- Premier Divertissement, Op. 15
- Variations brillantes sur la cavatine favorite de l'opéra Donna del Lago de Rossini, Op. 17
- Variations de bravoure sur la Romance de Joseph, Op. 20
- Exercices et préludes pour piano : dans tous les tons majeurs et mineurs, Op. 21
- Second divertissement brilliant sur une cavatine favorite de Rossini, Op. 22
- Variations brillantes pour piano forte seul sur le chœur favori d'Il crocciato de Meyerbeer, Op. 23
- Polonaise brillante, Op. 25
- Douze walses brillantes, Op. 26
- Variations non difficiles sur la gavotte de Vestris, Op. 28
- Variations et finale sur un air de ballet de F. Paer, Op. 29
- Trois Airs Variés, Op. 30
- Saxon air with introduction & variations, Op. 31
- Caprice ou Grande Fantaisie et Variations Brillantes, Op. 32
- Rondo caractéristique pour le piano forte sur la barcarolle de Marie, Op. 33
- Contredanses variées suivis d'une valse, Op. 35
- Grandes variations sur le choeur des Grecs du Siège de Corinthe de Rossini, Op. 36
- Rondo on a favourite song from Moïse, Op. 37
- Sul margine d'un rio, Op. 38
- Trois airs variés, Op. 39
- Rondoletto, Op. 40
- Grandes variations brillantes sur l'air favori Le petit tambour, Op. 41
- Variations quasi fantaisie sur le trio favori de Mazaniello "Notre Dame du Mont Carmel" de Cassasa, Op. 43
- Rondo-capriccio sur la barcarolle favorite de La muette de Portici, Op. 44
- La dolcezza, Op. 45/1
- La melanconia, Op. 45/2
- La semplicità, Op. 45/3
- Air Suisse, Op. 46
- Grande fantaisie sur des airs de l'opéra Le Comte Ory de Rossini, Op. 47
- Variations brillantes, Introduction et Final alla Militare, sur la Cavatine favorite de La Violette de Carafa - Arrangement facile par Hartl, Op. 48
- Les élégances : contredanses brillantes et variées suivies d'une grande valse, Op. 49
- Variations brillantes sur la dernière valse de C. M. de Weber, Op. 51
- Introduction et Rondo sur le Carillon motif favori des Deux Nuits, musique de Boieldieu ou 1er. Caprice, Op. 52
- Polacca from the musical bijou for 1830 on the favorite romance Dormez, dormez, chères amours, Op. 53
- Thème original : with brilliant variations, Op. 55
- La Parisienne, Op. 58
- Variations on 'Non Più Mesta' from Rossini's 'La Cenerentola', Op. 60
- Trois Rondeaux Caractéristiques, Op. 61
- Grandes variations sur le Choeur des Chasseurs d'Euriante de Weber, Op. 62
- Marche et Rondo sur "La clochette", Op. 63
- La mode : contredanses variées : suivies d'une gallopade, Op. 64
- Nocturne, Op. 65/1
- Polka, Op. 65/2
- Cavatine de Zampa variée, Op. 66
- Variations on the March from Rossini's 'Otello', Op. 67
- Cavatina from Semiramide variations, Op. 68
- Rondo Militaire on a March from 'Le Serment', Op. 69
- Récréations musicales : rondeaux, variations & fantasies pour le piano forte sur 24 thèmes organisés en huit suites, Op. 71
- Agitato et rondo sur la barcarolle chantée par Tamburini dans l'opera Gianni di Calais de Donizetti, Op. 73
- Souvenir de Vienne, Paris, et Londres : trois fantasies, Op. 75
- Variations on the Trio from 'Le Pre aux Clercs', Op. 76
- Variations Brillantes and Finale à la Hongroise from Mathilde di Shabran, Op. 77
- Variations brillantes dans une forme nouvelle sur la cavatine favorite Vivi tu, Op. 78
- La Coquette, scène de Bal, Op. 79
- Les Rivales, deux mélodies variées, Op. 80
- Introduction & Variations on an original Theme, Op. 81
- Grandes variations seul sur la marche favorite de l'opéra de Bellini I Puritani, Op. 82
- Les Étrangères, Op. 83
- Rondo : (Valse de la reine d'Angleterre), Op. 85
- Melodies, variées, Op. 88
- Fantaisie dramatique, Op. 89
- Trois morceaux de salon, Op. 91
- Grandes variations de concert avec introduction et finale sur un Laendler viennois, Op. 92
- Fantaisie et variations sur deux motifs du Postillon de Lonjumeau, Op. 94
- Variations brillantes : avec introduction & finale sur une marche autrichienne, Op. 97
- Grande fantaisie brillante sur un motif favori de l'opéra d'Ambroise Thomas: La double Échelle, Op. 98
- Méthode complète, Op. 100
- Melange sur l'opera Elisa e Claudio, Op. 101
- Grande fantaisie sur des motifs favoris de Lucia di Lamermoor de Donizetti, Op. 102
- Rondo brilliant : sur Stradella, musique de Niedermeyer, Op. 103
- Grand duo du couronnement, Op. 104
- Variations Brillantes on a Theme by Bellini - La Sonnambula, Op. 105
- Fantaisie brillante en forme de rondo sur des motifs du "Domino noir", musique de D. F. E. Auber, Op. 106
- Six amusements, Op. 107
- Fantaisie brillante sur des motifs de l'opera de L. Clapisson, La Figurante, Op. 108
- Petit divertissement sur une Cracovienne favourite, Op. 109
- Grande fantaisie sur la Romanesca, fameux air de danse du XVIe siècle, Op. 111
- Grande fantaisie et variations brillantes sur des motifs de l'opéra: L'Élisire d'Amore de Donizetti, Op. 112
- Variations et rondo sur Le lac des fées d'Auber, Op. 114
- Grande fantaisie et finale à la militaire sur 2 mélodies de F. Schubert, Op. 115
- La Catalane : rondo-bolero sur un motif de A. Elwart, Op. 116
- Ballade, Op. 117/1
- Ballade, Op. 117/2
- Trois soeurs : 3 fantasies sur des motifs originaux, Op. 118
- 30 études progressives, Op. 119
- Marche favorite des chasseurs de Lutzow ou Grettly, valse suisse ou styrian Waltz, (also known as Grand Swiss Waltz) Op. 120.
- Grande fantaisie sur Les diamans de la couronne : opéra de D. F. E. Auber, Op. 126
- Variations et Rondino sur 2 motifs de L.s Clapisson, Op. 127
- Divertisement sur le galop de l'opera La jolie fille de Gand, Op. 128
- Grand Concert Fantasy on themes from Semiramide de Rossini, Op. 130
- Le Tremolo, sur un thème de Beethoven, Op. 132
- Fantaisie et variations brillantes : sur l'opéra de Donizetti, Parisina, Op. 133
- La Polka : arrangée pour le piano, Op. 135
- Variations caractéristiques sur un thème arabe (Pas de L'abeille, de La péri, de F. Burgmüller), Op. 137
- Grande fantaisie sur un motif de Linda di Chamonix, Op. 138
- Dom Sébastien : opéra de Donizetti : 3 divertissements sur des airs de ballet, Op. 139
- Les Succes de Salon, Cavatine de Vaccay, Op. 142
- Lutine, Valse Brillante, Op. 145
- Grande fantaisie brillante sur des motifs favoris de l'opéra Lucrezia Borgia de G. Donizetti, Op. 147
- Les fleurs italiennes, Op. 149
- 24 études très faciles, pour les commençants, Op. 151
- La Pastorale ou 18 grandes études de concert, Op. 153
- Nouvelle tyrolienne originale : variée pour le piano, Op. 154
- Fantasy & Variations on various American National Themes, Op. 158
- Variations brillantes on "The last rose of summer", Op. 159
- Three new American polkas, Op. 160
- Tribut à l'Amérique suivi d'une polka de concert, Op. 161
- Carry me Back, Op. 162/1
- O Susannah!, Op. 162/2
- Fantaisie Mexicane, Op. 162/3
- Grande fantaisie militaire avec accompagnement d'orchestre sur la marche populaire de l'opéra La fille du régiment, Op. 163
- Marche nationale mexicaine, Op. 166
- La Californienne, Op. 167
- L' écume de mer : marche et valse brillante, Op. 168
- Le Carnaval de Venise: Variations Brilliantes, Op. 170
- La Tapada, Op. 171
- La cristallique : polka mazurka, Op. 175
- Fantaisie brillante sur des motifs de Charles VI (?), Op. 184
- Le chant du pèlerin : élégie, Op. 187
- Marche et Rondo de Ernani, Op. 189
- Rêverie nocturne, Op. 194
- Grande sonate di Bravura, Op. 200
- Les perles animées Grande Valse, Op. 211
- Récréations illustrées : 12 petites fantasies characteristiques pour le piano d'une execution facile et sans écarts de mains, Op. 215
- La Belle Créole, Op. 217
- Fantaisie et variations brillantes sur des motifs de La sirene : opéra de D.F.E. Auber
- Empress Henriettas waltz
- Flower of America, waltz
- Galop à la Giraffe
- Grande fantaisie militaire
- La Barcarolle: Fantasie four le piano sur une Barcarolle celebre de Weber
- Le Chalet Rondo
- Paganini's Last Waltz
- Polka Caprice
- Rondo de Paganini
- Rondo sur un air français (ed. J.P. Coulon)
- Scales and Exercises, Part 1&2
- The Celebrated Marseilles march (La Marseillaise)
- The drawing room schottisch
- The flower of the prairie waltz
- There is no home like my own
- La valse Suisse : rondeau dal Guglielmo Tell di Rossini
- Faites-lui mes aveux
- Three Irish melodies arranged for the Piano
- Fantaisie brillante sur La part du diable de D.F.E. Auber
- Six galops brillants : composés pour les bals de l'opera
- Rondoletto de chasse
- Variations sur un thème original de T. Labarre
- Comic polka
- Gaily the troubadour a celebrated air with an introduction & variations
- Blue bells of Scotland
- The celebrated Cinderella waltz
- A second divertimento in which is introduced Rossini's celebrated cavatina: Dinnebraca Donzella
- Fleurs de chant
- Rondo Turc
- Three airs de ballet : from Auber's opera of La bayadère : arranged as rondos for Piano
- Technical studies
- La Carlotta Grisi, grande valse
- Tribute to America (Polka de salon)
- 3 airs de ballets de la Muette de Portici

=== Piano, four hands ===
- Grandes variations sur une marche favorite de Guillaume Tell, Op. 50
- Variations concertantes sur la marche favorite du Philtre (Der Liebestrank) de D.F.E. Auber, Op. 70
- Grand duo brilliant sur un motif de l'opera L'Elisire d'amore de Donizetti, Op. 113
- Air montagnard : varié, Op. 129
- Les Belles du Nord, Op. 140
- Grand duo concertant sur des motifs favoris du Désert, musique de F. David, Op. 156
- Variations sur l'air Allemand "O Mein lieber Augustin"
- Duo sur la flûte enchantée.

=== Two Pianos ===
- Home Sweet Home ou Variations et rondeau brilliant, Op. 16
- Second grand duo concertant sur les marches favorites d'Alexandre et de La donna del lago, Op. 72
- Introduction, theme with four variations, and rondo in B♭ Major

== Chamber music ==
=== Violin and Piano ===
- Duo & variations concertans pour Piano et Violon sur la romance: C'est une larme, Op. 18
- Fantaisie & variations pour Piano et Violon composées sur des thèmes russes, Op. 19
- Variations concertantes pour Piano et Violon sur la chansonnette favorite de L'enfant du régiment, Op. 24
- Variations brillantes pour Piano et Violon sur la marche favorite de Moïse, Op. 42
- Variations concertantes pour Piano et Violon sur la tyrolienne favorite de La fiancée d'Auber, Op. 56
- Variations concertantes pour Piano & Violon sur la barcarolle favorite de Fra Diavolo de D. F. E. Auber, Op. 59
- Dernier grand duo concertant pour Piano et Violon sur une cavatine favorite de la Niobe de Pacini, Op. 110

=== Piano Trio ===
- Piano Trio, Op. 54

=== Other ===
- Grand Variations pour Piano, Violon, Alto et Violoncelle, Op. 6
- Rondo de concert pour Piano, 2violons, alto et basse ad libitum, Op. 27

== Orchestral ==
=== Piano and Orchestra ===
- Grande Polonaise for piano and Orchestra op. 30
- Piano Concerto No. 1 in A major, Op. 34 (1828)
- Variations de concert sur une marche favorite de Guillaume Tell de Rossini pour Piano et Orchestre, Op. 57
- Piano Concerto No. 2 in C minor, Op. 74 (1834)
- Piano Concerto No. 3 in D minor, Op. 87 (1835)
- Fantaisie et variations sur un thème favori de Bellini pour Piano et Orchestre, Op. 90
- Piano Concerto No. 4 in E major, Op. 131 (1843)
- Piano Concerto No. 5 in F minor, Op. 180 (1854)
- Piano Concerto No. 6 in A major, with chorus, Op. 192 (1858)
- Piano Concerto No. 7 in B minor, Op. 207 (1864)
- Piano Concerto No. 8 in A-flat major, Op. 218 (1873)

== Songs ==
- I will return to thee
- The pilgrimage
- Tis sad to part
- We have liv'd and lov'd together
- Why are you weeping dear mother !
- O No, I never Shall Forget
