= PKF – Prague Philharmonia =

- Orchestra
- Native name: Pražská komorní filharmonie
- Founded: 1993
- Location: Prague, Czech Republic
- Concert hall: Rudolfinum
- Principal conductor: Emmanuel Villaume
- Website: www.pkf.cz

The PKF – Prague Philharmonia (Czech: Pražská komorní filharmonie, abbreviation: PKF; literal translation, "Prague Chamber Philharmonia") is a Czech orchestra based in Prague. The orchestra gives concerts in several venues in Prague, including the Dvořák Hall of the Rudolfinum, the Church of St. Simon and Jude, the Švanda Theatre in Smíchov and the Salon Philharmonia. The orchestra receives government and civic sponsorship from the Czech Ministry of Culture, the City of Prague and the Prague 1 Municipal Authority.

== History ==
Jiří Bělohlávek founded the orchestra in 1993, after his resignation as chief conductor of the Czech Philharmonic the previous year. The Czech Ministry of Defence had offered funding for training 40 young musicians to act as their own music ensemble, to replace the Prague Symphony Orchestra in that capacity. Bělohlávek decided to form a new chamber orchestra instead with the funds, and had auditioned musicians for the orchestra. However, the ministry withdrew its funding the next year. Bělohlávek subsequently secured private funding for the orchestra, which made its public debut in 1994. Bělohlávek served as the orchestra's first music director and chief conductor, from 1994 to 2005. He led the orchestra in its debut at The Proms in London in July 2004. Bělohlávek subsequently held the title of conductor laureate of the orchestra from 2005 until his death in 2017.

The Swiss conductor Kaspar Zehnder became the orchestra's second chief conductor in 2005, and Jakub Hrůša simultaneously became principal guest conductor. Zehnder stepped down from the chief conductorship in June 2008 at the expiration of his contract. In March 2008, the orchestra announced the appointment of Hrůša as their third chief conductor, effective in September 2008. Hrůša held the post through the 2014–2015 season. In October 2014, the orchestra announced the appointment of Emmanuel Villaume as its fourth chief conductor, effective with the 2015–2016 season, with an initial contract of 3 years.

The orchestra has made recordings for a number of labels, including Supraphon, Deutsche Grammophon, Warner Classics, EMI, Harmonia Mundi, and Pentatone.

== Chief conductors ==
- Jiří Bělohlávek (1994–2005)
- Kaspar Zehnder (2005–2008)
- Jakub Hrůša (2008–2015)
- Emmanuel Villaume (2015–present)
