= Fantaisie, Op. 111 (Fauré) =

Fantasy for piano and orchestra by Gabriel Fauré

Fantaisie
- by Gabriel Fauré
- Fauré in 1918
- Key: G major
- Opus: 111
- Composed: 1918
- Dedication: Alfred Cortot
- Movements: three (played without interruption)
- Scoring: piano; orchestra

Premiere
- Date: 12 April 1919
- Location: Monte Carlo
- Performers: Marguerite Hasselmans, piano; Léon Jehin, conductor

The Fantaisie for piano and orchestra, Op. 111, is a concertante composition written by Gabriel Fauré in 1918.

== History ==
The idea of a concertante work for piano and orchestra came indirectly from Debussy, who had written to his publisher Jacques Durand that he was thinking of a series of Concerts for piano and various instrumental groups. After Debussy's death in 1918, Durand suggested the idea to Fauré.

By 8 September, Fauré was almost done with the piece, writing to his wife: "I've almost finished my piece for piano and orchestra. I seem to work more quickly and easily as I grow older... I must say the news of the war has cheered me, as I expect it has to you." Fauré's biographer Jean-Michel Nectoux suggests that Fauré asked Marcel Samuel-Rousseau to orchestrate the piece under his supervision, as his hearing was getting worse.

The Fantaisie was dedicated to Alfred Cortot, who had asked Fauré as far back as 1902 to write a concertante work for him. The first, unofficial, performance was given at a Fauré festival in Monte Carlo on 12 April 1919 by Marguerite Hasselmans with Léon Jehin conducting. The first performance in Paris was given by Cortot on 14 May 1919 at a concert of the Société Nationale de Musique in the Salle Gaveau. The British premiere was on 2 September 1920 at the Promenade Concerts, under the baton of Henry Wood.

Cortot later wrote an article in which he expressed his reservations about the work, in particular the "lack of brilliance" in the solo part and the "shortage of contrasts" between it and the orchestra.

== Music ==
External audio
- Fantaisie, Op. 111, performed by Alicia de Larrocha with the London Philharmonic Orchestra under Rafael Frühbeck de Burgos

Though a romantic work, the Fantaisie is scored for a rather modestly sized orchestra of two flutes, two oboes, two clarinets, two bassoons, four horns, two trumpets, timpani, harp, strings, and solo piano. Nectoux notes that the relationship between soloist and orchestra is similar to the orchestration of the Ballade, written thirty years earlier: "the soloist takes first place – as a principal, we might say – while the power and colour of the orchestra serve to underline the argument. The strings are used almost throughout to accompany the piano but the woodwind are often treated as soloists"

The work consists of three interconnected movements, played without interruption:

1. Allegro moderato
2. Allegro vivo
3. Allegro moderato

== See also ==
- Fantaisie for piano and orchestra (Debussy)
