= The International Music Festival of F. L. Vek =

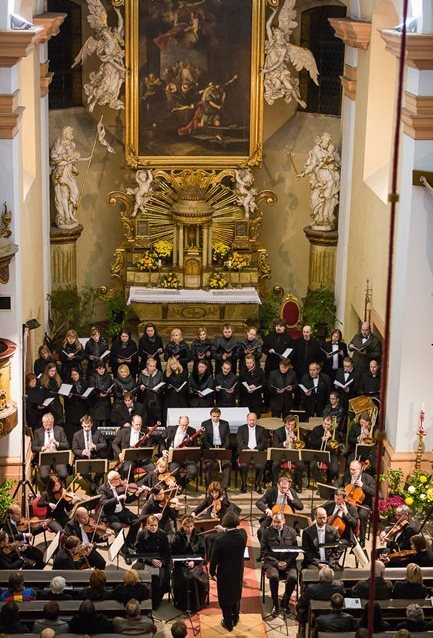
The International Music Festival of F. L. Vek in Dobruška, W. A. Mozart Requiem

The International Music Festival of F. L. Vek (Czech: Mezinárodní hudební festival F. L. Věka) is a festival of classical music in the Hradec Králové Region of the Czech Republic.

The International Music Festival of F. L. Vek was founded in 2011 in Dobruška. In the name of the festival's name of personality František Vladislav Hek, native from Dobruška, patriot, writer, musician and composer. Alois Jirásek had used autobiography of Hek in the novel F. L. Věk, filmed by Czech Television. Festival has been held under the auspices of many Czech personalities (Jiří Bělohlávek). Organizer is MAS Pohoda venkova and the Town of Dobruška, Artistic Director is Pavel Svoboda.

== Venue of concerts ==
The festival takes place in:

- Church of Holy Spirit, Dobruška
- Church of Saint Wenceslaus, Dobruška
- Husův sbor, Dobruška
- Showroom of Servisbal Obaly company, Dobruška
- Cultural house in Solnice
- Church of Saint Procopius, Přepychy
- Church of Saint Mary Magdalene, Deštné v Orlických horách
- Evangelical church, Bohuslavice
- Opočno Castle

== Soloists and orchestras ==
Radek Baborák - French horn, Jiří Bárta – Cello, Iva Kramperová, Ivan Ženatý, Josef Špaček, Václav Hudeček – Violin, Jaroslav Tuma, Pavel Svoboda – Organ, Kateřina Englichová – Harp, Ludmila Peterková - Clarinet, Michiyo Keiko (Japan), Raffaella Milanesi (Italy) – Soprano, Pavel Steidl - Guitar, Bennewitz Quartet, Barocco sempre giovane Orchestra, The Czech Chamber Philharmonic Orchestra Pardubice, Talich Philharmonia Prague, Boni Pueri, the Czech Boys Choir, Orchestra of period-instruments Collegium 1704 with conductor Václav Luks.

== Premieres ==
There are world premiers composed for the festival:

- 2011 Luboš Sluka: Meditation for violin and organ
- 2012 The choral work Žákovská koleda from the composer Sylvie Bodorová and the show about František Vladislav Hek presented by narrator Alfred Strejček.

== F. L. Věk International Music Festival Award ==
The project of F.L. Věk International Music Festival Award aims to prize a person, whose activities or artistic achievements contributed to the regional culture.

The Award for 2012 was given to professor Václav Rabas, the organist and the founding director of the Conservatory of Pardubice. Václav Rabas accepted the award from the hands of Senator Miluše Horská. This event was also attended by Luboš Sluka - composer, which is the holder of this award 2011.
