= Prague International Organ Festival =

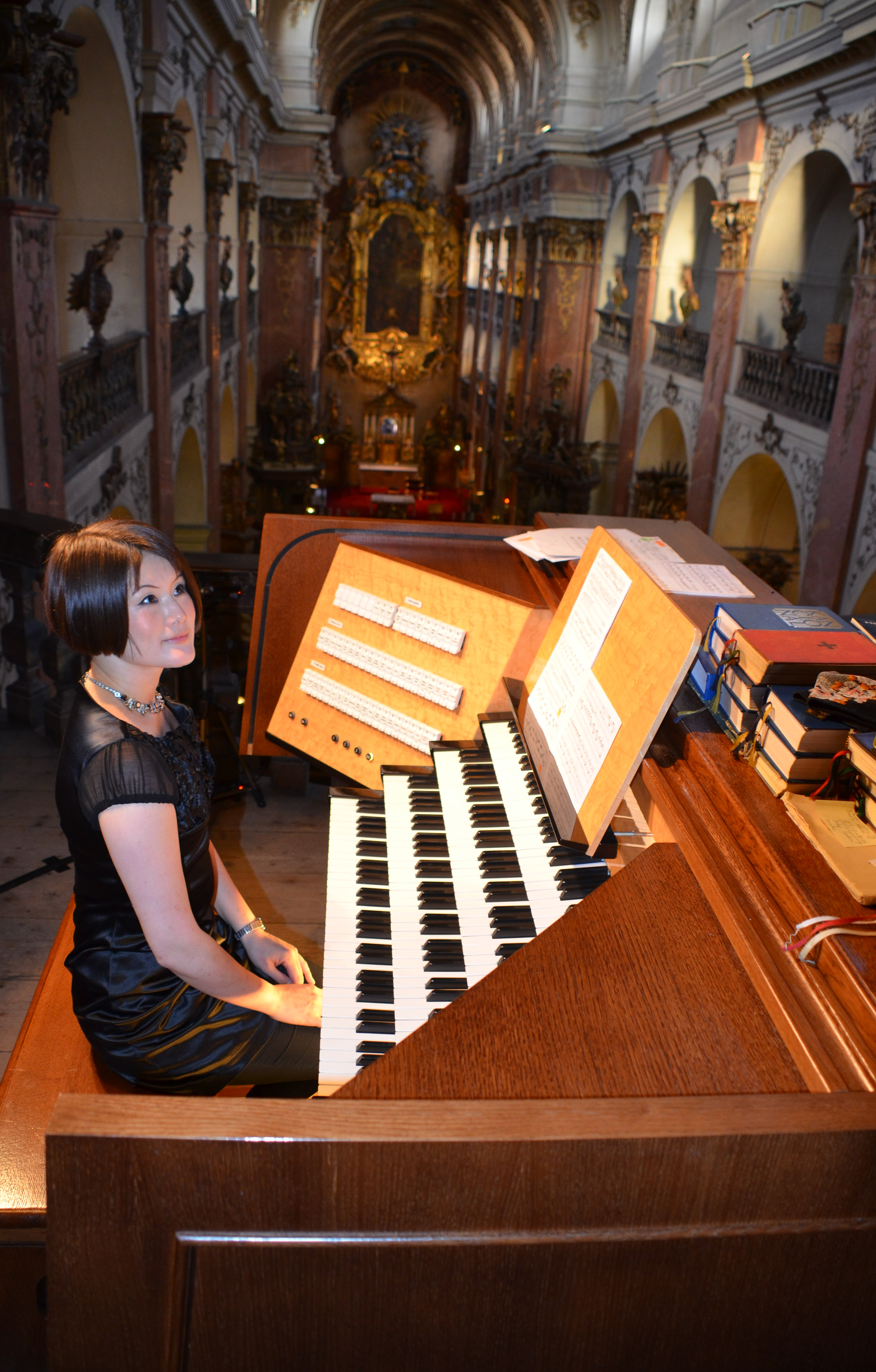
Eiko Maria Yoshimura at the 19th IOF

Prague International Organ Festival (Czech: Mezinárodní varhanní festival Audite Organum) is a festival for organ lovers, held annually in Prague, presenting a series of concerts by well-known organ virtuosos from all over the world. The inaugural edition was in 1996. The venue where the concerts are held is the stunning baroque St. James Basilica right beside Prague's Old Town square.

== Organists ==
- Czech republic: Aleš Bárta, Jaroslav Tůma, Jiří Ropek, Petr Rajnoha, Kamila Klugarová, Václav Uhlíř, Jan Hora
- France: Marie-Claire Alain, Susan Landale, Eric Lebrun, Thierry Escaich, Daniel Roth, Naji Hakim
- Germany: Johannes Geffert, Andreas Meisner
- Italy: Luciano Zecca, Alessandro Bianchi
- Poland: Roman Perucki, Waclaw Golonka, Robert Grudzien
- Switzerland: Lionel Rogg, Guy Bovet,
- USA: Carol Williams, Karel Paukert, Stephen Tharp
- Belgium: Eric Hallein, Kristiaan Seynhaave
- Canada: Philip Crozier
- Slovakia: Imrich Szabó
- Netherlands: Ben van Oosten
- Austria: Gunther Rost, Peter Planyavsky
- Japan: Hiroko Imai, Eiko Maria Yoshimura
- Great Britain: David Titterington
- Hungary: Zsuzsa Elekes
- Norway: Halgier Schiager
- Sweden: Juan Paradel Solé

== See also ==
- Designblok
