= International music competitions in the Czech Republic =

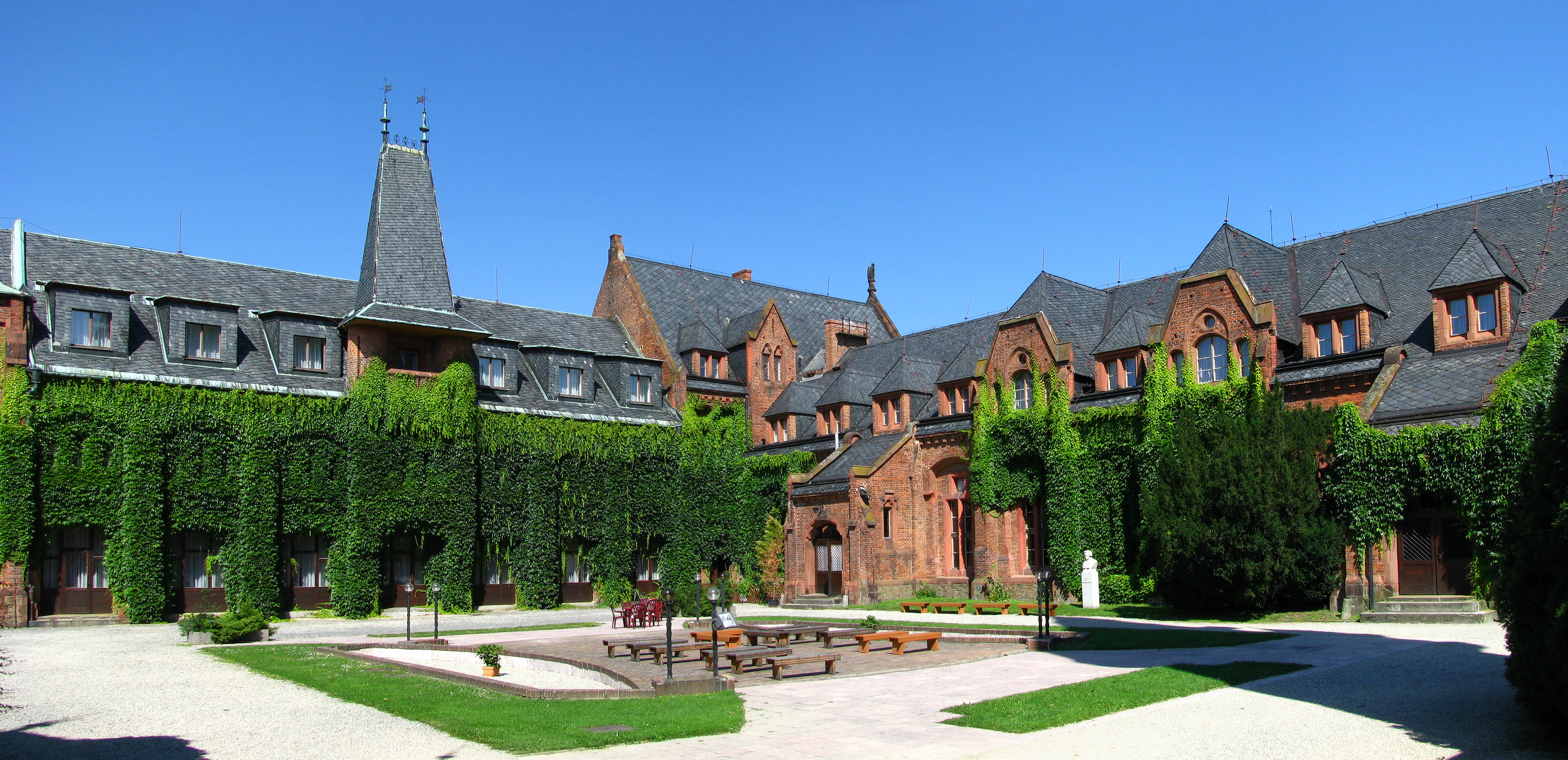
Beethoven's Hradec International Music Competition is held annually at the Red Castle in Hradec nad Moravicí

The idea of organizing the first international music competition in the Czech Republic emerged in 1946. It was proposed by the conductor Rafael Kubelík and members of the Czech Philharmonic Orchestra as a part of the Prague Spring International Music Festival. The first competition took place in May, 1947. In 1957, the Prague Spring International Music Competition became one of the founding members of the World Federation of International Music Competitions.

The city hosts competitions that cater to different ages such as the Concertino Praga which focuses on young musicians up to 16 years. In addition to youth competitions the country hosts the International competition of blind & partially sighted performers and composers which is held in Prague for young blind and partially sighted artists. Also, all types of music are celebrating by Prague from the Beethoven's Hradec International Music Competition to the František Gregor International Double Bass Competition which is held in one to four-year cycles in the Moravian town of Kroměříž. Some of the competitions, such as the Antonín Dvořák International Vocal Competition Karlovy Vary, was formerly only open to artists from Socialist bloc. Since 1989, after the collapse of the Eastern communist states, the competition is open without restrictions.

One of the latest international music events to be founded in the country is the International Bohuslav Martinů Festival and Choir Competition which started in 1999. As of 2009, Czech Republic hosts more than fifty international music competitions.

== List of international music competitions in the Czech Republic ==
Competition	Founded	Main characteristics
Prague Spring International Music Competition; Founding member of the World Federation of International Music Competitions	1947	Founded in 1947, the Prague Spring International Music Competition is the oldest competitions in the Czech Republic. It is held annually in May, as a part of the Prague Spring International Music Festival. Each year the competition is devoted to a selected instrument of the standard symphony orchestra. The international jury usually consists of seven members. Alongside the financial prize, the laureates of the competition have possibility to perform with Czech and international orchestras at various music festivals. Among the laureates are Mstislav Rostropovich, Soňa Červená, Věra Soukupová, Boris Gutnikov, Natalia Gutman, James Galway, Dagmar Pecková, Philippe Cuper and others.
International Music Festival Brno. International Performers' Competition	1950s	The tradition of regular music festivals in the Moravian metropolis Brno began in the 1950s. In 1966, the festival Brno Music May was replaced by International Music Festival, held annually in autumn. From 1967, he festival was accompanied by international competition of radio music programmes, Prix Musical de Radio Brno. In the 1990s the festival was reorganized, and today's festival Moravian Autumn is accompanied also by International Interpretation Competition for Young Musicians. The competition is held every five years in following categories: organ, french horn, tuba, double bass, percussion.
Leoš Janáček International Competition; Member of the European Union of Music Competitions for Youth	1993	The Faculty of Music of the Janáček Academy of Music and Performing Arts has organized the annual performance competition since 1993. The competition is divided into several categories: voice, string quartet, violin and piano. Individual categories regularly take turns in four-year cycles. The main purpose of the competition is to promote the works of Leoš Janáček.
Concertino Praga; Member of the European Union of Music Competitions for Youth		Concertino Praga, focused on young musicians up to 16 years (in some cases up to 19), is organized by Czech Radio. The competition is held in three-year cycles with following categories: piano, string quartet, wood and brass wind instruments and instrumental chamber ensembles up to quintets. Among the laureates are Václav Hudeček, Igor Ardašev, Radek Baborák and others.
Beethoven's Hradec International Music Competition	1962	Since 1962, Beethoven's Hradec International Music Competition is held annually at the castle in Hradec nad Moravicí. The competition usually takes place in the second week of June. From 2008, the competition include following categories: piano, violin (alternate with viola and violoncello), string quartet, piano trio. Since the 1990s, the competition is international. Polish pianist Krystian Zimerman was one of the first foreign competitors.
The Fryderyk Chopin International Piano Competition	1959	Polish composer Fryderyk Chopin visited the Czech town of Mariánské Lázně in 1836. More than one hundred years later, in 1959, was founded Czech Fryderyk Chopin Society. In 1960 the society began to organize annual music festival in Mariánské Lázně. From 1962, the festival is accompanied by Chopin Piano Competition. The laureates take part in the International Chopin Piano Competition in Warsaw. From 1992, the competition is international.
International Smetana Piano Competition; Member of the European Union of Music Competitions for Youth	1963	The Smetana Piano Competition was founded in 1963 in Hradec Králové, near Smetana's birthplace Litomyšl. From 2004, the competition is held in the city of Plzeň, where Bedřich Smetana spent a part of his student years. From 1976, the competition takes place biannually.
Amadeus	1995	The Mozartean competition Amadeus is organized by primary art schools in Brno. The competition is held since 1995, as a commemoration of the 255th anniversary of performance given by young Wolfgang Amadeus Mozart in the Reduta Theatre.
International Schubert Competition for Piano Duos	1978	Schubert Competition for Piano Duets was founded in 1978 by Věra and František Lejsek and Alois Složil. It is held in the Moravian town of Jeseník, usually biannually. Maximum combined age of competitors is 70 years.
Kocian Violin Competition; Member of the European Union of Music Competitions for Youth	1959	The competition is held annually in Ústí nad Orlicí, the native town of the violinist Jaroslav Kocian. The laureates of the competition include Bohuslav Matoušek, Václav Hudeček, Stefan Milenković and Pavel Šporcl. The competition was established in 1959.
Heran Violoncello Competition; Member of the European Union of Music Competitions for Youth	1968	Heran Violoncello Competition was initially held as a part of the Kocian Violin Competition in Ústí nad Orlicí. It was founded in 1968 by significant Czech cellist Bohuš Heran. From 1974, the competition is entirely independent. It is usually organized in April/May, before Kocian Violin Competition.
František Gregor International Double Bass Competition	1978	The competition was established in 1978 by double-bass player Miloš Gajdoš. It is held in one to four-year cycles in the Moravian town of Kroměříž.
International Biennial Guitar Competition with Masterclasses Kutná Hora	1980	Founded in 1980, the Biennial Guitar Competition with Masterclasses in Kutná Hora is held in the Tyl City Theatre. The competition gained official international status in 1990, however, the first international competitors participated in 1982. The jury was formerly exclusive Czech. Since 1992, the jury became international.
Petr Eben International Organ Competition	1978	The competition of young organ players is held biannually in the Silesian town of Opava. It was established in 1978, since 2000 the competition is international. In 2008 it was named after Czech composer Petr Eben. The competition takes place every October in the Opava library and in various churches. The participants compete in four different categories.
Antonín Dvořák International Vocal Competition Karlovy Vary	1966	Antonín Dvořák's New World Symphony was premiered on European continent in the Czech spa town Karlovy Vary. The International Vocal Competition, named after him, was formerly (from 1966 to 1989) only open to artists from Socialist bloc. The laureates of the competition include Magdaléna Hajóssyová and Edita Gruberová.
Festival of Songs Olomouc		The most extensive international choir competition in the Czech Republic is held in the Moravian town of Olomouc. The choirs and voice ensembles compete in thirty categories. The competition consists of three main parts: Czech children's choirs, Mundi cantant superior, and Mundi cantant. The main categories are divided according to the age or gender of competitors.
Musica religiosa Olomouc	2003	Musica religiosa Olomouc is a competition of sacred and church music for choirs. It is held annually in the period before Easter in Olomouc.
International Festival of Academic Choirs (IFAS)	1980	The Eastern Bohemian city of Pardubice hosts the competition of academic choirs as a part of the International Festival of Academic Choirs. Since 1980, the event is organized every two years. The jury consists of five members.
International Bohuslav Martinů Festival and Choir Competition	1999	The competition was established in 1999 by choirmaster of the Pardubice University Art Ensemble Vlastislav Novák. It was founded as a commemoration of the 40th anniversary of the death of Bohuslav Martinů. The international and Czech choirs have an opportunity to compete in several categories.
Praga cantat		Praga cantat, an amateur festival and competition for choirs, is usually held in National House in Vinohrady, Prague. The choirs compete in six categories: women choirs, mixed choirs, advanced mixed choirs, girls' choirs, mixed youth choirs and the category of folk songs.
International competition of blind & partially sighted performers and composers		The competition initially took place in Mariánské Lázně, today (2009) it is held in Prague. It is open for young blind and partially sighted artists, aged from 16 to 36. The participants compete in several instrumental categories, including composers' competition (without age limit).
International Zdeněk Fibich Competition in the Interpretation of Melodrama		The competition is named after composer Zdeněk Fibich, an important exponent and founder of the modern Czech concert and stage melodrama. It is organized by the Zdeněk Fibich Society as a part of the annual autumn International Festival of Concert Melodrama in Prague. The competition consists of three rounds and is limited to compositions with piano.
International Television Festival Golden Prague	1964	The festival Golden Prague, organized by Czech Television in Prague, was first held in 1964. It is one of the oldest television festivals in the world. The competition is open to various music genres, not just to classical music programmes.
International Composers' Competition Musica Nova	1969	Musica Nova is a competition for electroacoustic compositions. It was founded in 1969 in Plzeň by the Studio for Experimental Music of the Czechoslovak Radio. The competition consists of two main categories: solely electroacoustic compositions and live instrumental or vocal performance in combination with electroacoustic elements.

== Bibliography ==
Notes

Sobotka, Mojmír (2009). "Music Competitions in the Czech Republic". Czech Music Quarterly. 2: 11–24.
