= Péter Dobszay =

Hungarian organist and composer

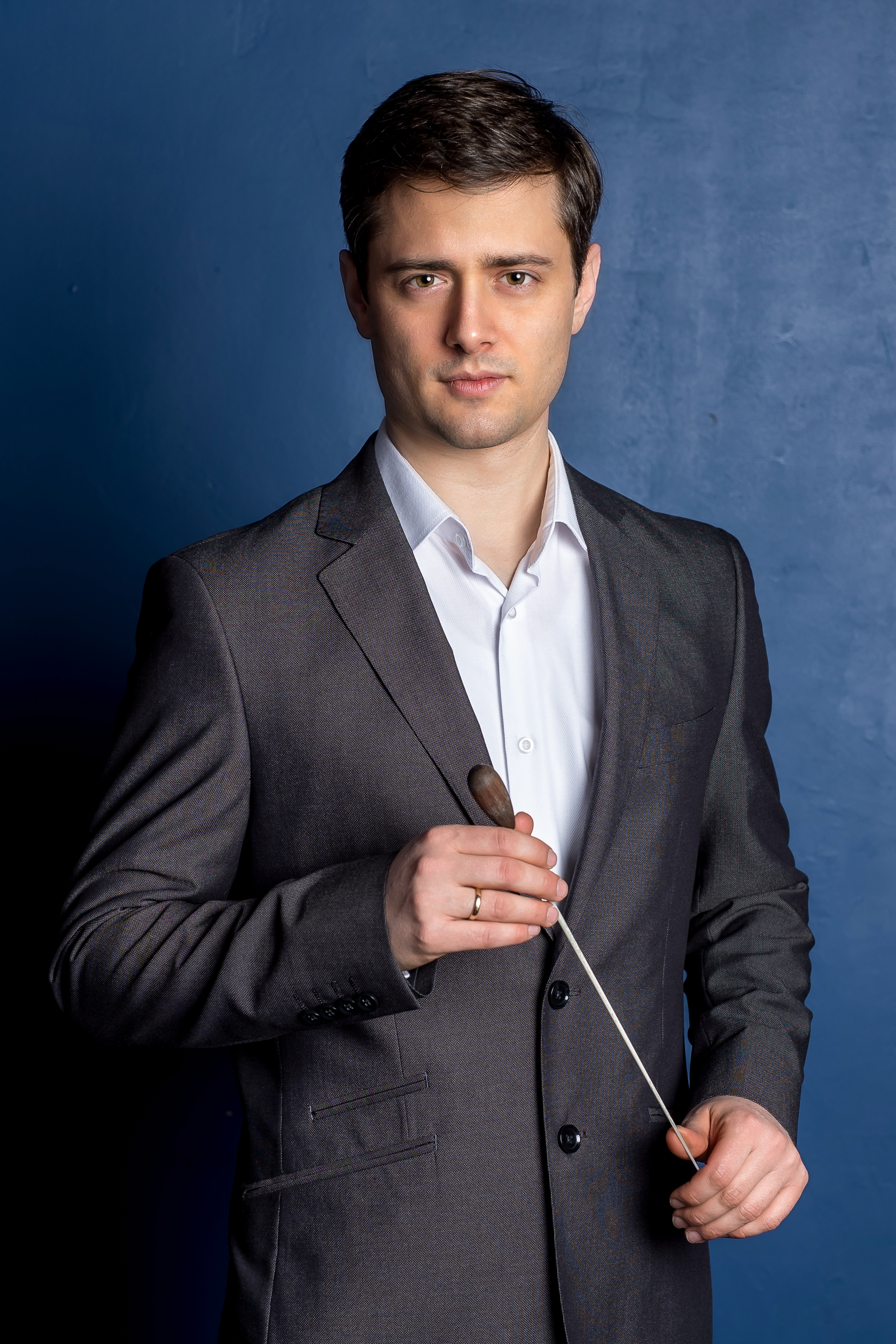
- Photo: József Csapó Wágner

Background information
- Born: 13 November 1990; Budapest, Hungary
- Occupations: conductor, organist
- Instrument: Organ

Péter Dobszay (Budapest, 13 November 1990 -) Hungarian conductor and organist, winner of the Junior Prima award. He is the artistic director and lead conductor of the Alba Regia Symphony Orchestra, music director of the National Theatre of Szeged, and lecturer at the Liszt Ferenc Academy of Music. He has conducted almost all professional Hungarian symphony orchestras in a wide variety of genres and has performed both as a church organist and as a concert organist throughout Europe and Asia.

== Personal life ==
Péter Dobszay was born to Tamás Dobszay, associate professor at Eötvös Loránd University, historian, and a software designer mathematician. He is the grandson of musicologist-choral conductor László Dobszay. His aunt, Ágnes Dobszay, is a church music historian and a university professor. Music is central to the life of his entire family.

His wife, Ilona Dobszay-Meskó, is a composer and a conductor. Their children are László (2015) and Anna (2017).

== Career ==
He received his secondary education at the Madách Imre Gimnázium.

From 2009, he studied organ at the Liszt Ferenc Academy of Music under the mentorship of László Fassang, János Pálúr, and István Ruppert. As a second-year university student, he won third prize at the 17th Petr Eben International Organ Competition in 2010. He has performed at numerous venues throughout Europe, including in Germany, Switzerland, the Czech Republic, Romania, and Austria. He gave a solo recital in Vienna and was invited to perform at the prestigious organ festival of the Church of St. James the Greater in Prague. He has honed his skills in masterclasses with world-renowned organists such as Olivier Latry, Christoph Bossert, David Titterington, and Jacques van Oortmerssen. In 2010, he was accepted into the Liszt Academy's talent management program, a selective program for young artists with potential for an international solo career.

Péter studied the foundations of conducting under the guidance of Zsolt Hamar, and in 2013, he was accepted to the orchestral conducting program at the Academy in addition to his studies in organ performance. At the Academy, he studied conducting with András Ligeti, Tamás Gál and Ádám Medveczky, and graduated in 2015. In the Fall of 2014, he attended Péter Eötvös conducting masterclass. In 2017, he was a finalist and Audience Choice Award Winner of the Maestro Solti International Conducting Competition.

He has served as first organist at the Dohány Street Synagogue since 2013, and at the Church of the Holy Angels in Gazdagrét since 2015. He has been conductor of the Szolnok Symphonic orchestra since 2015 and Artistic Director and Principal Conductor of the Alba Regia Symphony Orchestra since 2021. In 2023, László Barnák invited him to become the music director of the National Theatre of Szeged and to head its Opera Department. The board meeting on 5 September officially finalized his appointment. He works as a visiting lecturer at the Composition Department of the Liszt Academy, teaching ensemble conducting and contemporary music.

He is a regularly returning guest conductor at the Hungarian National Philharmonic Orchestra, the Hungarian State Opera, the Hungarian Radio Symphony Orchestra, the Pannon Philharmonic, the Danubia Orchestra Óbuda, the Győr Philharmonic Orchestra, the Savaria Symphony Orchestra, the Szeged Symphony Orchestra, the Hungarian Symphony Orchestra Miskolc, the MÁV Symphony Orchestra, and the Budapest Operetta Theatre. He has conducted the Budafok Dohnányi Orchestra, the Szent István Philharmonic, the Danube Symphony Orchestra, the Mendelssohn Chamber Orchestra of Veszprém and the Anima Musicae Chamber Orchestra. He often conducts oratorio concerts in church venues. He is at home in theatrical genres, conducting operas and ballets as well as musicals and operettas (e.g. The Nutcracker, Countess Maritza, Lieutenant Mary). In his view, the presence of contemporary music in the concert scene is crucial. Since 2017, he has been working closely with the Studio 5, a creative collective of composers. He has participated in various recording projects for the Hungarian Radio and in several premieres.

He has performed worldwide both as a conductor and as an organist. He has conducted the orchestra of the Kyoto Music Festival in Japan, the orchestra of the Urals Mussorgsky State Conservatoire in Yekaterinburg, Russia, the Philharmonisches Orchester Altenburg-Gera in Germany, and the Oradea State Philharmonic Orchestra, the Târgu Mures State Philharmonic Orchestra and the Dinu Lipatti State Philharmonic Orchestra in Satu Mare in Romania. In Hungary, he has conducted at the Müpa Budapest and the Grand Hall of the Liszt Academy, and at the Kodály Centre in Pécs. He has also performed in Israel at the Church of the Holy Sepulchre in Jerusalem, in Switzerland at the Geneva Conservatory of Music, in Vienna at St Stephen's Cathedral, as well as in Macedonia.

== Discography ==
As contributor:

- Szeged Trombone Ensemble - Over Tonality (private release, 2019)
- Zukunftsmusik ostwärts (klanglogo, 2020)

== Awards and honors ==
- 3rd place at the 17th Petr Eben International Organ Competition (2010)
- 3rd place for the merit scholarship of the Kodály Institute of Kecskemét - Rezső Lantos Choral Conducting Competition (2013) (teacher: Tamás Gál)
- 3rd place for the merit scholarship of the Kodály Institute of Kecskemét - Rezső Lantos Choral Conducting Competition (2014)
- Hungarian Kodály Society Special Prize for the best performance of Kodály's Gömör Song - Rezső Lantos Choral Conducting Competition (2014)
- Performer Award (conductor) - Liszt Academy Composition Competition (2015)
- Audience Choice Award - Maestro Solti International Conducting Competition (2017)
- Junior Prima Award in the category of Music (2019)
