= Pavel Svoboda (organist) =

Czech organist

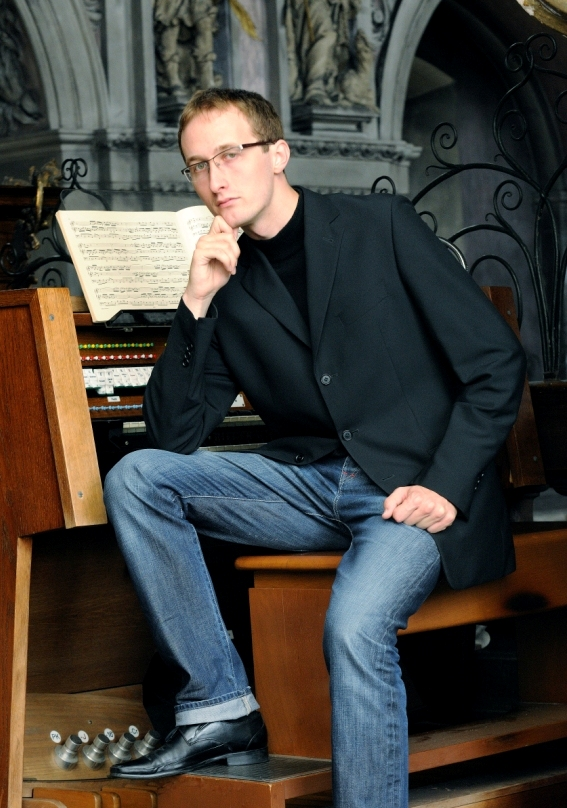

Member of the Chamber of Deputies of the Czech Republic
- In office October 9, 2021 – October 8 , 2025

Personal details
- Born: 26 October 1987 (age 38) Opočno
- Party: TOP 09 (since 2022)
- Other political affiliations: Independent

Pavel Svoboda (born 26 October 1987 in Opočno, Czech Republic) is a Czech politician and organist.

== Musical career ==
This organist and harpsichordist graduated from the Conservatory of Pardubice (prof. Josef Rafaja and Doc. Vaclav Rabas). Since 2008, he has been studying at the Music Faculty of the Academy of Performing Arts in Prague at Doc. Jaroslav Tuma and since 2010 at the University of the Arts in Berlin at Leo van Doeselaar. He performs at music festivals, cooperates with violinist Iva Kramperová and as a soloist he plays with the orchestras (Karlovy Vary Symphony Orchestra etc.). Since 2004 he has been a standing organist and cembalist of Barocco sempre giovane chamber orchestra (artistic director Josef Krečmer). He makes CD recordings, as well as those for Český rozhlas and the Czech Television. He is also active as a dramaturge and organizer of the classical music festivals in Bohemia, in 2011 he became artistic director of The International Music Festival of F. L. Vek.

== Political career ==
In the 2021 Czech parliamentary election, he was the leader of the SPOLU coalition candidate list (i.e. ODS, KDU-ČSL and TOP 09), as a non-partisan candidate for Pardubice Region. He received 5,393 preferential votes and was elected as a deputy.

In 2022, he joined TOP 09 and in November 2023, he became a member of the party's presidium.

He did not run for re-election in the 2025 Czech parliamentary election.

== Prizes ==
- Competition for Young Organists in Opava 2004 - 1st prize
- Prize of the foundation Czech Music Fund (Český hudební fond)
- International Performers Competition in Brno 2007 - 1st prize and the Laureate title
- Prize of the mayor of the city of Pardubice for excellent study results
- Petr Eben International Organ Competition 2008 - 2nd prize

== See also ==
- List of MPs elected in the 2021 Czech parliamentary election
