= Přepychy =

Přepychy may refer to places in the Czech Republic:

- Přepychy (Pardubice District), a municipality and village in the Pardubice Region
- Přepychy (Rychnov nad Kněžnou District), a municipality and village in the Hradec Králové Region
