= Bohuslav Matoušek =

Bohuslav Matoušek (born in Havlíčkův Brod, 26 September 1949) is a Czech violinist and violist. At present he is a lecturer at the Academy of Music in Prague and JAMU.

He studied in the classes of Jaroslav Pekelský and Václav Snítil at Prague's Academy of Music. He has cooperated with Kurt Masur, Zubin Mehta, Leonard Bernstein, Jaroslav Tůma, Czech Philharmonic, Bohuslav Martinu Philharmonic Orchestra, Barocco sempre giovane etc. In 1985 he co-founded and performed as the primarius of the Stamic Quartet. He is Professor of the Faculty of Music of the Academy of Performing Arts in Prague.

== Prizes ==
- 1966 - Concertino Praga - 1st prize
- 1970 - He received the special prize of the jury at the Tibor Varga International Violin Competition along with a Swiss grant, which he used to sustain himself during a yearlong course of study with Wolfgang Schneiderhan in Lucerne.
- 1972 - Prague Spring International Music Competition - 1st prize
- 2001 - Cannes Classical Award in the 20th century Chamber Music category
- Grand Prix du Disque award (with Stamic Quartet)
