= Josef Krečmer =

Josef Krečmer (born 3 March 1958) is a Czech violoncellist.

== Career ==
Krečmer was born on 3 March 1958 in Vysoké Mýto, Czechoslovakia. He graduated at the conservatories in Teplice and Prague (professors Mirko Škampa and Josef Chuchro) and Academy of Performing Arts in Prague (professors Saša Večtomov and Miloš Sádlo). During his studies he participated in the masterclasses of Erki Rautio and Natalia Shakhovskaya. Since 1979 he is a teacher at the Conservatory in Pardubice, between 1989 and 1991 he worked for the Yehudi Menuhin Foundation in Paris where he helped to organize the performances of many young Czech musicians in France. In 1991–2003 he was the leader of the Chamber Philharmonic Orchestra in Pardubice and he makes CD recordings, as well as those for Czech Radio and the Czech Television.

Josef Krečmer is the Music director of an ensemble Barocco sempre giovane (Baroque Still Young) which he founded in 2004, concert master of this ensemble is Iva Kramperová. The concert activities of this orchestra include performances at music festivals in the Czech Republic (Prague Spring International Music Festival, International Music Festival in Brno etc.) and abroad.

== Prizes ==
- 1973 – Performers Competition HM ČSSR (Music Youth of Czechoslovakia) – 1st prize
- 1974 – Heran International Competition of Young Violoncellists - 2nd prize and the award for the best Czechoslovak contestant
- 1975 – International radio competition Concertino Praga in Prague – 1st prize
