= Barocco sempre giovane =

Czech chamber orchestra

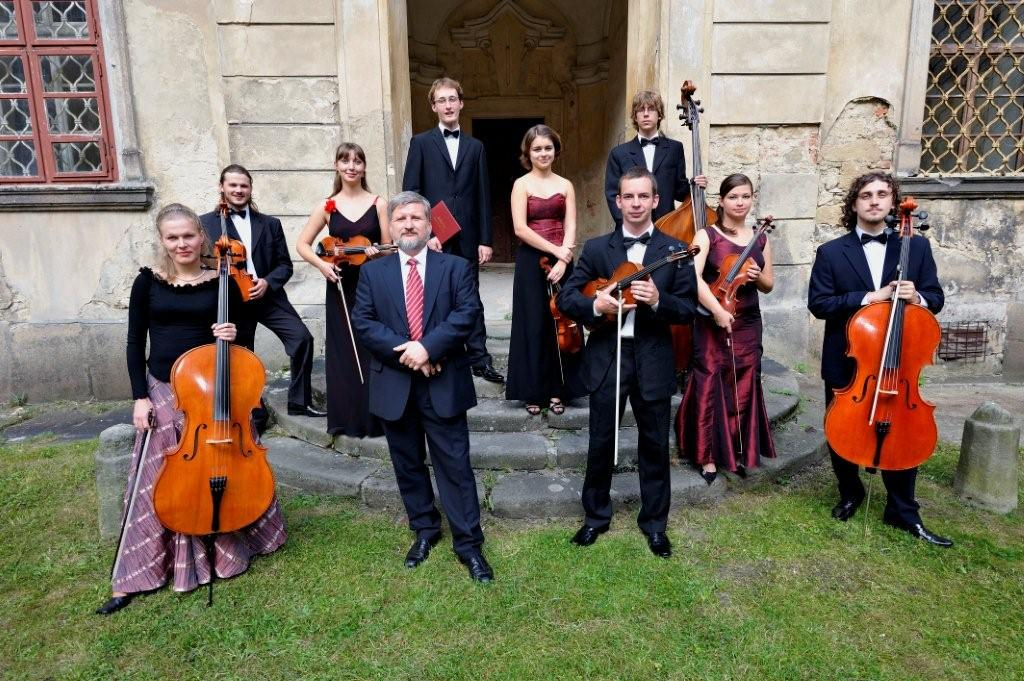
Barocco sempre giovane

Barocco sempre giovane is a professional Czech chamber orchestra.

Barocco sempre giovane (Baroque forever young) was founded in 2004 by a violoncellist Josef Krečmer. It is a chamber ensemble consisting of young musicians, standing organist and harpsichordist is Pavel Svoboda, concert master is Iva Kramperová. It makes CD recordings, performs on Czech television and cooperates regularly with Czech Radio. The young performers focus primarily on the music of the European baroque and classical masters, as well as the contemporary music (Luboš Sluka, Slavomír Hořínka, Vít Zouhar).

== Concert performances ==
The concert activities of the orchestra include performances at music festivals in the Czech Republic (in 2010 it will be Prague Spring International Music Festival, and Brno International Music Festival) and abroad (Belgium, Slovakia, Spain). Barocco sempre giovane cooperates with renowned soloists: Václav Hudeček, Michaela Fukačová, Ivan Ženatý, Ludmila Vernerová, Jiří Stivín, and Jaroslav Tůma.
