= Václav Rabas (organist) =

Czechoslovak organist and music teacher

Václav Rabas (14 August 1933 – 20 April 2015) was a Czech organist and music teacher.

== Biography ==
Rabas was born on 14 August 1933 in Dolní Bezděkov, Czechoslovakia. He graduated from the Prague Conservatory and from the Faculty of Music of the Academy of Performing Arts in Prague (prof. Jiří Rheinberger). He won the first prize in the Prague Spring International Organ Competition. He recorded for Czech Radio and Czech Television. He was a professor of the Faculty of Music of the Academy of Performing Arts in Prague and Conservatory in Pardubice (his students: Aleš Bárta, Pavel Svoboda etc.). He premiered some organ works of Petr Eben, Miloslav Kabeláč, Luboš Sluka, Klement Slavický etc.

Rabas died on 20 April 2015 in Pardubice, Czech Republic, at the age of 81.
