= Kramper =

Kramper (feminine: Kramperová) is a surname. Notable people with the surname include:

- Iva Kramperová (born 1984), Czech violinist
- Jindra Kramperová (1940–2024), Czech figure skater and pianist
- Kateřina Kramperová (born 1988), Czech tennis player
