= Iva Kramperová =

Czech violinist (born 1984)

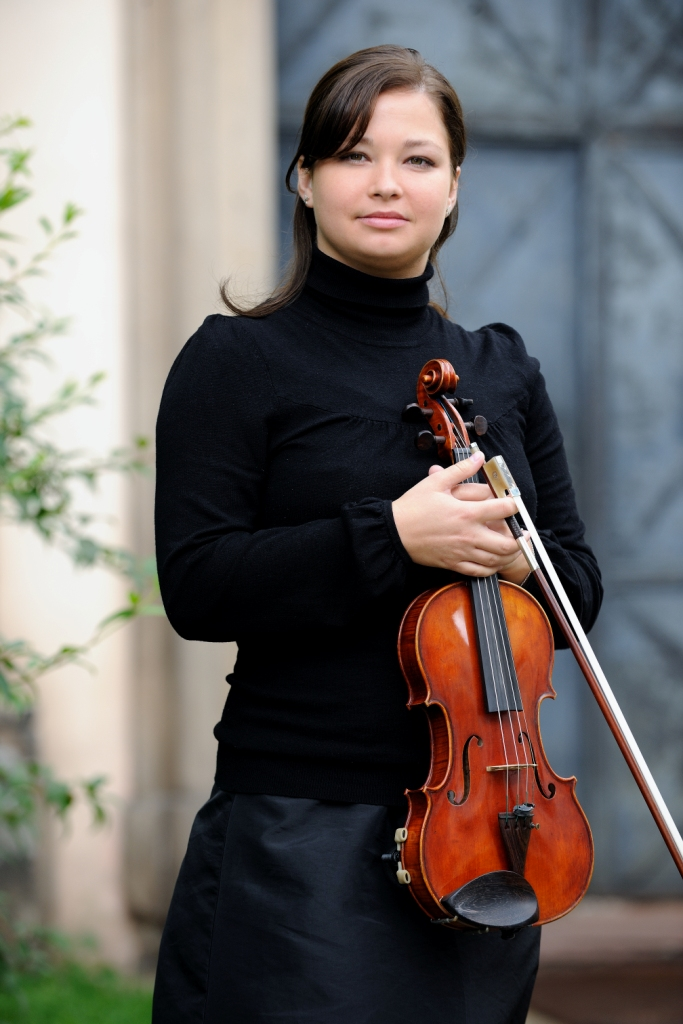
Iva Kramperová

Iva Kramperová (born 1984) is a Czech violinist.

Iva Kramperová studied at the Music Faculty of Academy of Performing Arts in Prague (Prof. Ivan Straus, Leoš Čepický), she has participated in several master classes in the Czech Republic (Václav Hudeček) and abroad (France – Régis Pasquier).

She is the concert master and soloist of Barocco sempre giovane. With this ensemble she has performed at hundreds of concerts (including of Prague Spring International Music Festival) for example for Office of the President of the Czech Republic. She makes recordings for the Czech Radio and the Czech Television. She cooperates with soloists (Václav Hudeček, Ivan Ženatý, Jiří Stivín, Barbara Maria Willi, Václav Rabas, Radek Baborák) and orchestras.

Since 2007, Kramperová has been professor at the conservatory in Pardubice.

== Awards ==
- Prize of the foundation Český hudební fond (Czech Music Fund) for the best performance of contemporary music
- Laureate of Leoš Janáček International Competition in Brno
- Competition of Conservatories of the Czech Republic
- Laureate of Beethoven's Hradec International Music Competition
- Prize of the mayor of the city of Pardubice for excellent study results
- Scholarship of Yamaha Corporation
