= Ivo Kahánek =

Czech music educator and pianist (born 1979)

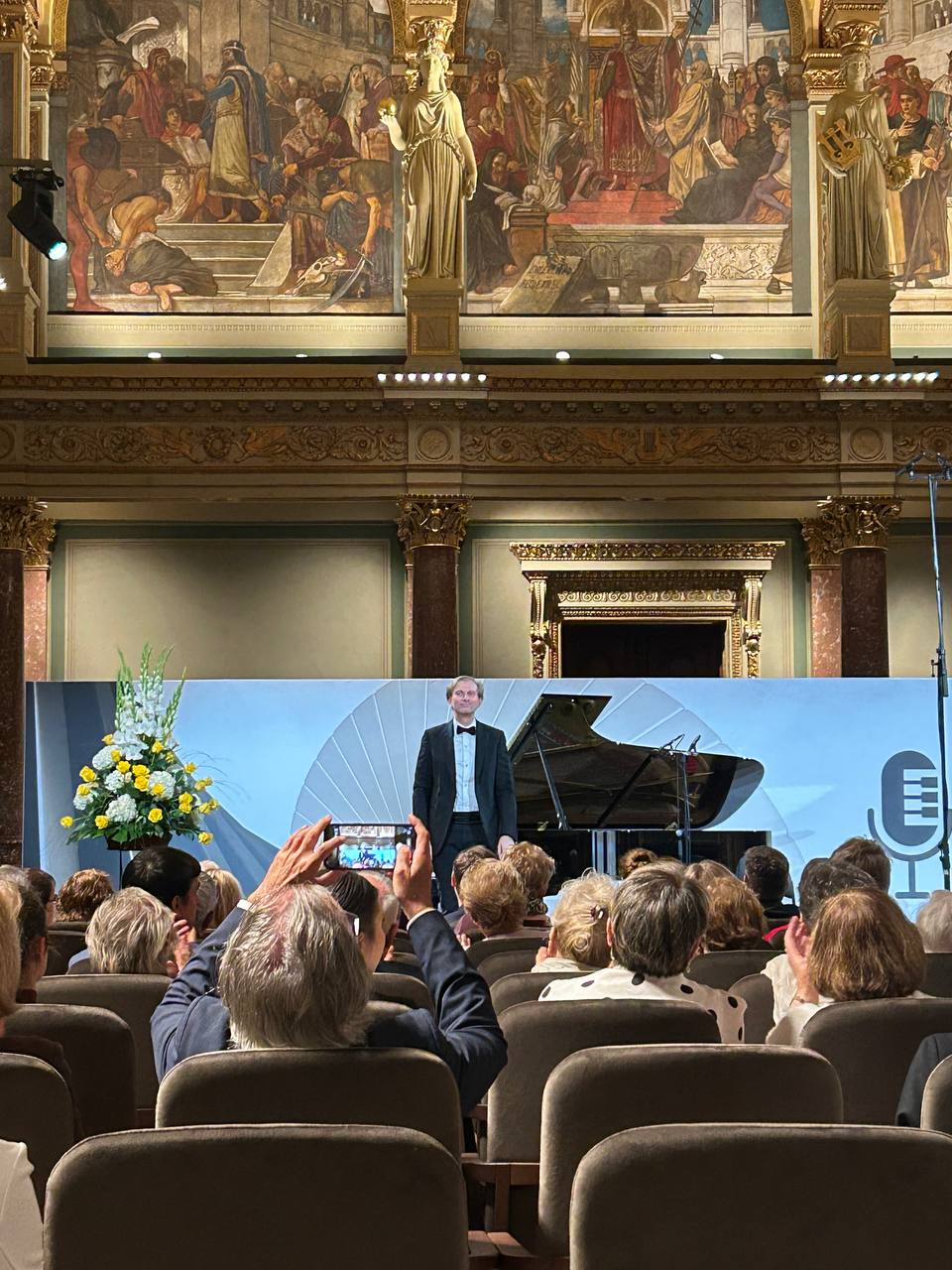
Ivo Kahánek performing at Hungarian Academy of Sciences, 2025

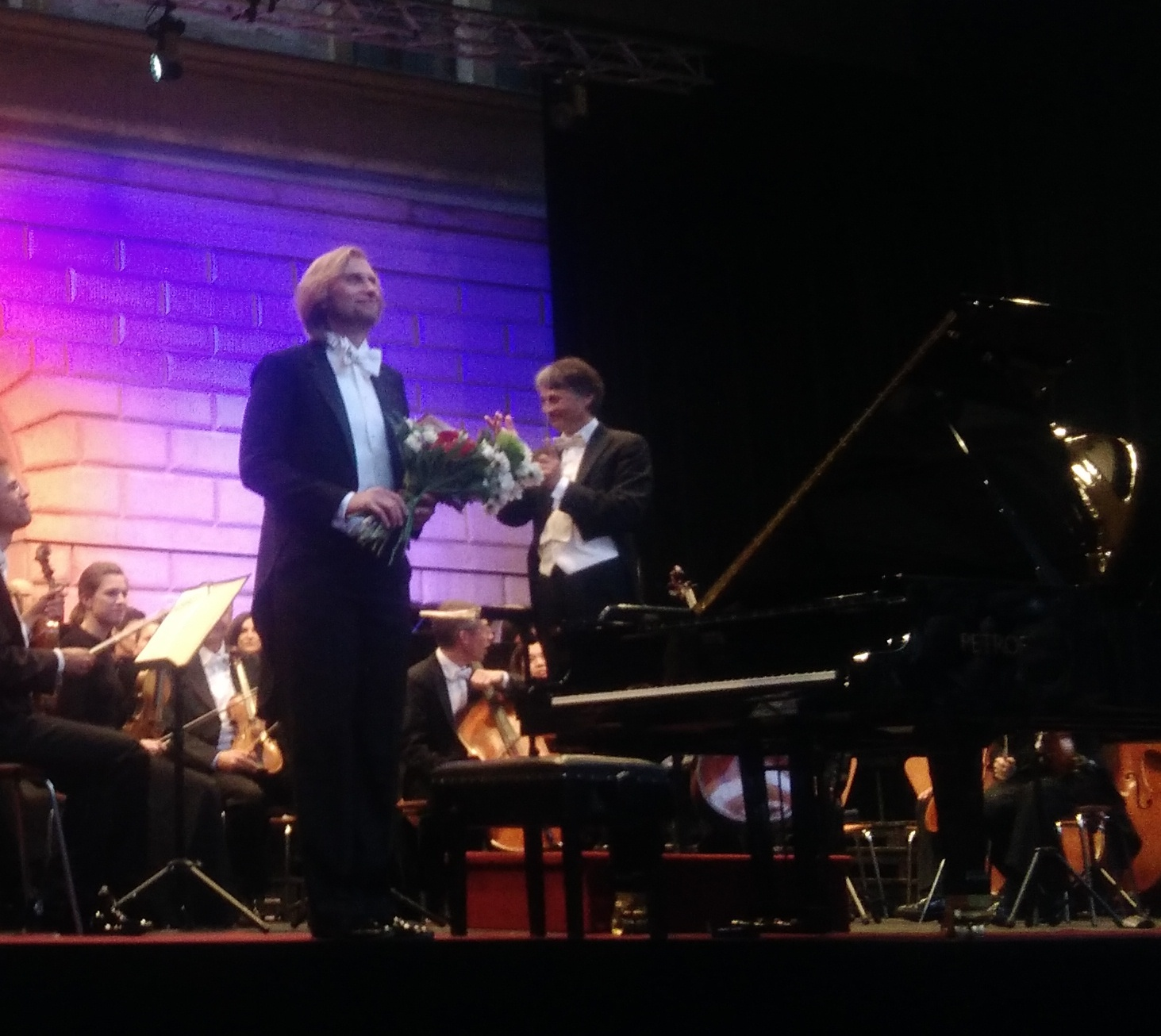
Ivo Kahánek, international opera festival Smetana's Litomyšl, 2018

Ivo Kahánek (born 1979) is a Czech pianist. He won the Prague Spring International Music Competition in 2004 and gained awards at other leading international piano competitions (Maria Canals Piano Competition in Barcelona, Vendome Prize in Vienna, Fryderyk Chopin International Piano Competition in Marienbad, Concertino Praga).

== Life and career ==
After his successful debuts at Beethovenfest in Bonn and the Prague Spring Festival he was invited by the BBC to perform at the BBC Proms with the BBC Symphony Orchestra under its chief-conductor Jiří Bělohlávek. He also performs regularly with the Czech Philharmonic Orchestra and its chief-conductor Zdeněk Mácal and has played with WDR Orchestra Cologne, Czech Radio Symphony Orchestra and many others.

In 2007 Kahánek released two CDs with music by Janáček, Martinů, Klein and Kabeláč and consequently signed a three-year contract with Supraphon Music. Besides he frequently collaborates with Czech Radio and Czech Television.

A graduate of the Academy of Performing Arts in Prague under Ivan Klánský, Ivo Kahánek also studied for one semester on the Advanced Instrumental Studies course at the Guildhall School of Music and Drama in London under Ronan O'Hora and participated in master classes with Karl-Heinz Kämmerling, Christian Zacharias, Alicia de Larocha, Imogen Cooper, Peter Frankl and many others
