= Renata Pokupić =

Croatian operatic mezzo-soprano (born 1972)

- Born: 24 July 1972 (age 54)
- Education: Music Academy of Zagreb
- Occupation: Mezzo-soprano

Renata Pokupić (born 24 July 1972, Virovitica, Yugoslavia (now Republic of Croatia) is a Croatian operatic mezzo-soprano.

== Life and career ==
Renata Pokupić attended the School of Arts in Zagreb where she studied sculpture and afterwards graduated and obtained her Master of Music from the Music Academy of Zagreb, where she studied with Zdenka Žabčić-Hesky. Soon after graduation she won two first prizes from The 36th Antonín Dvořák International Voice Competition in Karlovy Vary, Czech Republic, as well as two special prizes from the same competition. She reached finals of the 8th International Mozart Competition in Salzburg and the Competizione dell' Opera in Dresden in 2002. Pokupić holds numerous awards among which are the Le Cercle International des Amis et Mecenes du Chatelet award (International Circle of Friends and Patrons of Théâtre du Châtelet, CIAM) and the Orlando for the best performance at the Dubrovnik Summer Festival 2004 with the Purcell Quartet. She also received the Milka Trnina award and is a member of the International Women's Forum. She was given one of the main roles in the film All the Best by Snježana Tribuson, and won the Breza Award for best debut at the Pula Film Festival 2016.

== Discography ==
- W. A. Mozart: LES MYSTÈRES D ISIS, PARIS, 1801, Le Concert Spirituel, Flemish Radio Choir, Diego Fasolis, conductor. Glossa
- Václav Jan Křtitel Tomášek (1774-1850): Songs, Renata Pokupić (mezzo-soprano), Roger Vignoles (piano). Hyperion
- G. F. Handel: JOSHUA: NDR Chor, Göttingen Festival Orchestra, Laurence Cummings, conductor. Accent Records
- G. F. Handel: FLAVIO: Early Opera Company, Christian Curnyn, conductor. Chaconne/Chandos.
- I. Stravinsky: L’OISEAU DE FEU, PETROUCHKA, LE SACRE DU PRINTEMPS, PULCINELLA. Orchestre Philharmonique de Monte-Carlo, Yakov Kreizberg, conductor. OPMC Classics.
- B. KUNC, B. BRITTEN & B. BERSA: AFTER THE CROSSING, with Đorđe Stanetti, piano. Cantus.
- Les Troyens, Hector Berlioz, conducted by John Eliot Gardiner, with the Orchestre Révolutionnaire et Romantique, Monteverdi Choir and Susan Graham, among others
- Operngala - 16. Festliche Operngala für die AIDS-Stiftung, conducted by Andriy Yurkevych, Chorus and Orchestra of the Deutsche Oper Berlin
