= Petr Rajnoha =

Czech organist

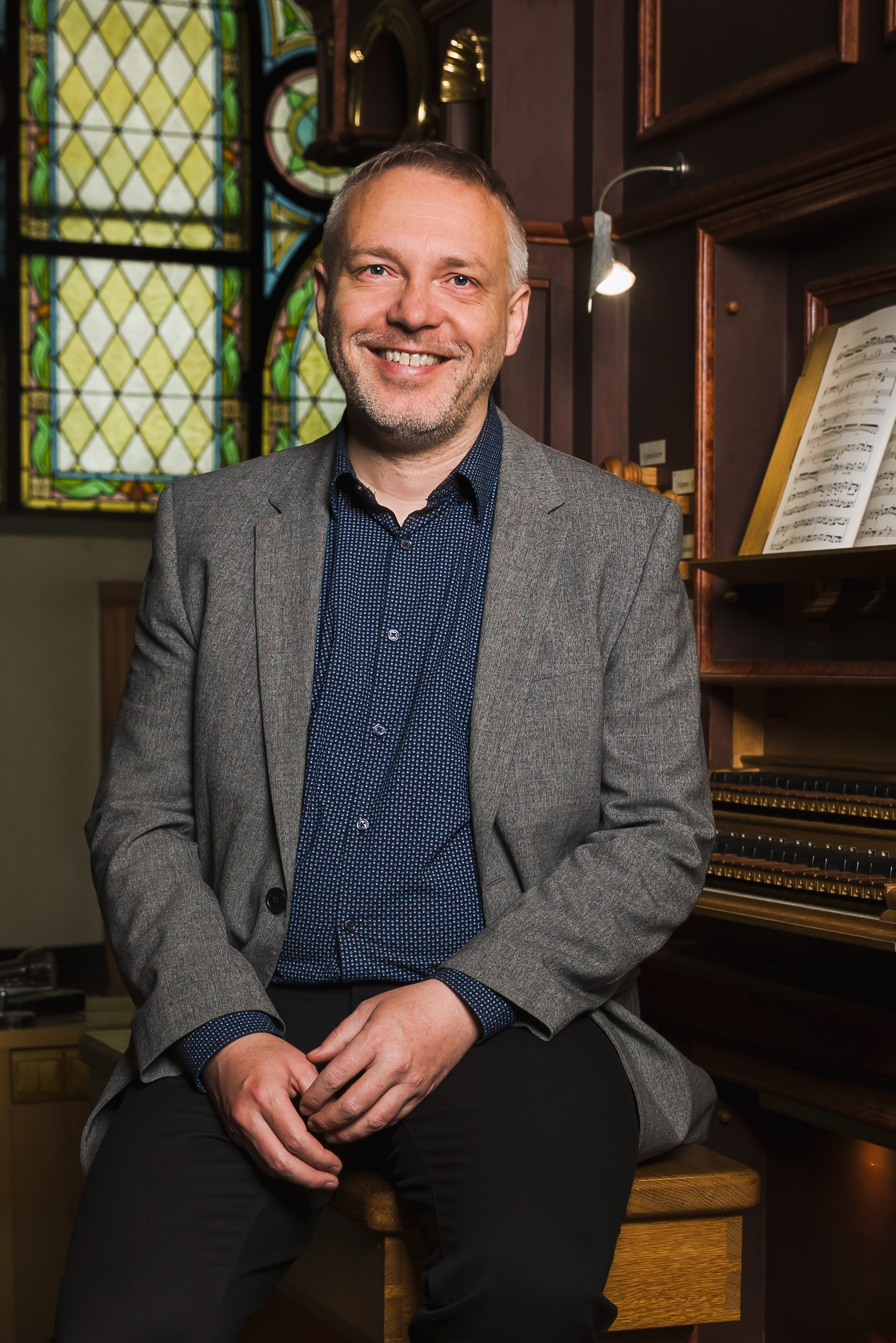
Petr Rajnoha

Petr Rajnoha (born in 1974) is a Czech organist.

He is a graduate of the Conservatory in Brno and the Faculty of Music of the Academy of Performing Arts in Prague under the tutelage of Prof. Jaroslav Tůma. In 1996 – 1997 he continued his studies at the Conservatoire de Paris under Professor Susan Landale.

In 2006, Rajnoha recorded the Five Concert Fantasies by Josef Klička for the Czech label ARTA Records.

== Prizes ==
- Prizes at International Performers Competition in Brno 1997
- Prague Spring International Music Competition 1999
- First Prizes at International Organ Competition Nuremberg 2000
