= Olivier Thouin =

Canadian violinist

Olivier Thouin is a Canadian violinist. He has performed as a soloist with several leading symphony orchestras in Canada, including the Orchestre Métropolitain, Les Violons du Roy, and the Montreal Symphony Orchestra. A highly active chamber musician, he has performed several times at the Caramoor International Music Festival, the Marlboro Festival, and the Toronto International Music Festival among others. He is a founding member of Trio Contrastes with whom he actively performed from 1998 to 2003. He can be heard on recordings made for Amberola Records and ATMA Records.

Born in Joliette, Quebec, Thouin began studying the violin at the age of four with Hratchia Sevadjian. He is a graduate of the Conservatoire de musique du Québec à Montréal where he studied with Sonia Jelinkova and was awarded the Prix avec Grande Distinction in 1995. After winning the Prix d’Europe and the Canadian Music Centre’s Prize in 1997, he pursued further studies at the Academy of Performing Arts in Prague with Ivan Straus. He has also attended masterclasses taught by Igor Ozim in Switzerland.

Thouin is the former concertmaster of the Jeunesses Musicales World Orchestra with whom he toured Asia, Europe and Israel. For his work with that ensemble he received the Cécile-Mesnard-Pomerleau Prize. In 1998 he won the Jules C. Reiner Violin Award at the Tanglewood Music Festival and in 2002 he received the Young Canadian Musicians’ Award. He served as the concertmaster of the National Arts Centre Orchestra in the 2004–2005 season.
