= Schola Gregoriana Pragensis =

Czech a capella male choir

- Choir
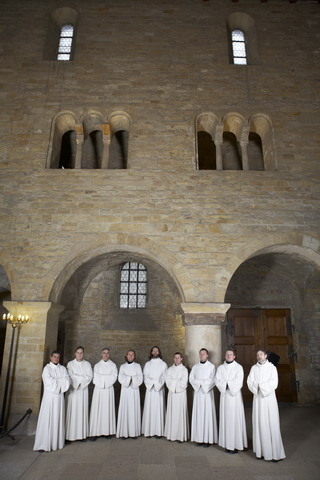
- Founded: 1987 (38 years ago)
- Founder: David Eben
- Genre: Medieval sacred music including Gregorian chant and Bohemian polyphony
- Music director: David Eben
- Awards: Choc du monde de le musique 10 de Repertoire; Zlatá Harmonie
- Website: www.gregoriana.cz/en/sgp

Schola Gregoriana Pragensis (English: The Gregorian School of Prague) is an a cappella male voice choir from the Czech Republic, founded in 1987 by David Eben. Their core repertoire consists of Gregorian chant, Bohemian plainchant, and early polyphony, but they also perform modern works including some composed for them.

== Description ==
=== Schola Gregoriana Pragensis ===
The Schola Gregoriana Pragensis is a choir from the Czech republic with primary focus on Gregorian chant and Bohemian plainchant. The choir formed in 1987 under the direction of David Eben and was restricted in its repertoire to only liturgical music for the first two years. Since the Velvet Revolution of 1989, the choir has extended its repertoire to include a variety of sacred music, with particular focus on Gregorian chant (monophonic Latin liturgical music) and early polyphony.

The choir has won several awards, including the Choc du monde de le musique, 10 de Repertoire and Golden Harmony (Zlatá Harmonie). Since inception they have toured a variety of countries.

Of particular importance is the choir's work in researching and performing Bohemian plainchant and early polyphony.

The choir has between six and nine members with a repertoire of various sacred music. They have toured many countries, including Japan, Israel, Norway, Sweden, Italy, Spain, France, Germany, Austria, Belgium, the Netherlands, Luxembourg, Switzerland, Slovakia, Hungary and Poland.

Their work in the interpretation of medieval music, with particular focus on Bohemian plainsong, is particularly significant with a focus on the symbolism of neumatic notation from the 10th and 11th centuries. Performances feature the original Bohemian plainchant tradition, including the earliest examples of polyphony. In addition they have performed music from 14th and 15th century and more modern compositions, including some written specifically for the group.

They have produced numerous recordings under the Supraphon and other labels.

The choir has participated in early music festivals, including the Festival Early Music at Utrecht in 2014.

The work of David Eben and the choir has featured in Czech academic publications related to musicology.

=== David Eben ===
David Eben
- Born: 6 January 1965 (age 60); Prague, Czech Repulblic
- Genres: Early Music and Choral direction
- Occupation: Academic
- Instruments: Vocal, clarinet
- Years active: 1992–present (2016)
- Website: http://www.gregoriana.cz/en/stranka/david-eben

David Eben is the son of composer Petr Eben and is the founder and director of Schola Gregoriana Pragensis. He started studies in musicology at the philosophy school of the Charles University in Prague in 1986 following completion of his training in clarinet at the Prague Conservatory. He began concentrating on mediaeval music in 1986 and graduated from Paris Conservatory (Conservatoire de Paris) having studied Gregorian chant conducting.

He established the Schola Gregoriana Pragensis in 1987.

He regularly teaches theory and practice of Gregorian chant at summer school at Musiques et Patrimoine Rânes, Normandy, France and at the Festival de Musique Sacré de Fribourg in Switzerland.

He has collaborated with Czech radio to produce programs on Gregorian chant.

As of 2016, he works at Charles University in Prague, where he lectures in musicology and liturgy.

He is a member of the music group Eben Brothers.

=== Other choir members ===
- Stanislav Predota is one of the founding members of Schola Gregoriana Pragensis.

== Discography ==
The group has made the following recordings:

- 1995 – Rosa Mystica Supraphon SU 0194-2 231
- 1997 – Liturgical Year – Gregorian chant
- 1998 – Antica e moderna
- 1996 – In Pragensi Ecclesia
- 1999 – Codex Franus
- 2002 – Ach, homo fragilis
- 2004 – Missa III., Vesperae Beatae Mariae Virginis, Litaniae B. M. V. à 8.
- 2005 – Maiestas Dei
- 2007 – Salve Mater, Salve Jesu
- 2009 – Dom zu St. Blasien Orgelmusik und Gregorianischer Choral
- 2009 – Musica Sacra – Buddhist Shõmyõ & Gregorian Chants
- 2010 – Dialogs (Jiří Bárta – violoncello)
- 2011 – Adventus Domini
- - – Carolus IV
- - – Christus natus est: Gregorian Chant on Christmas Eve
- - – Anno Domini 997
- - – Musica Sacra: Buddhist Shõmyõ & Gregorian Chants
