= Jiří Stivín =

Czech flutist and composer (born 1942)

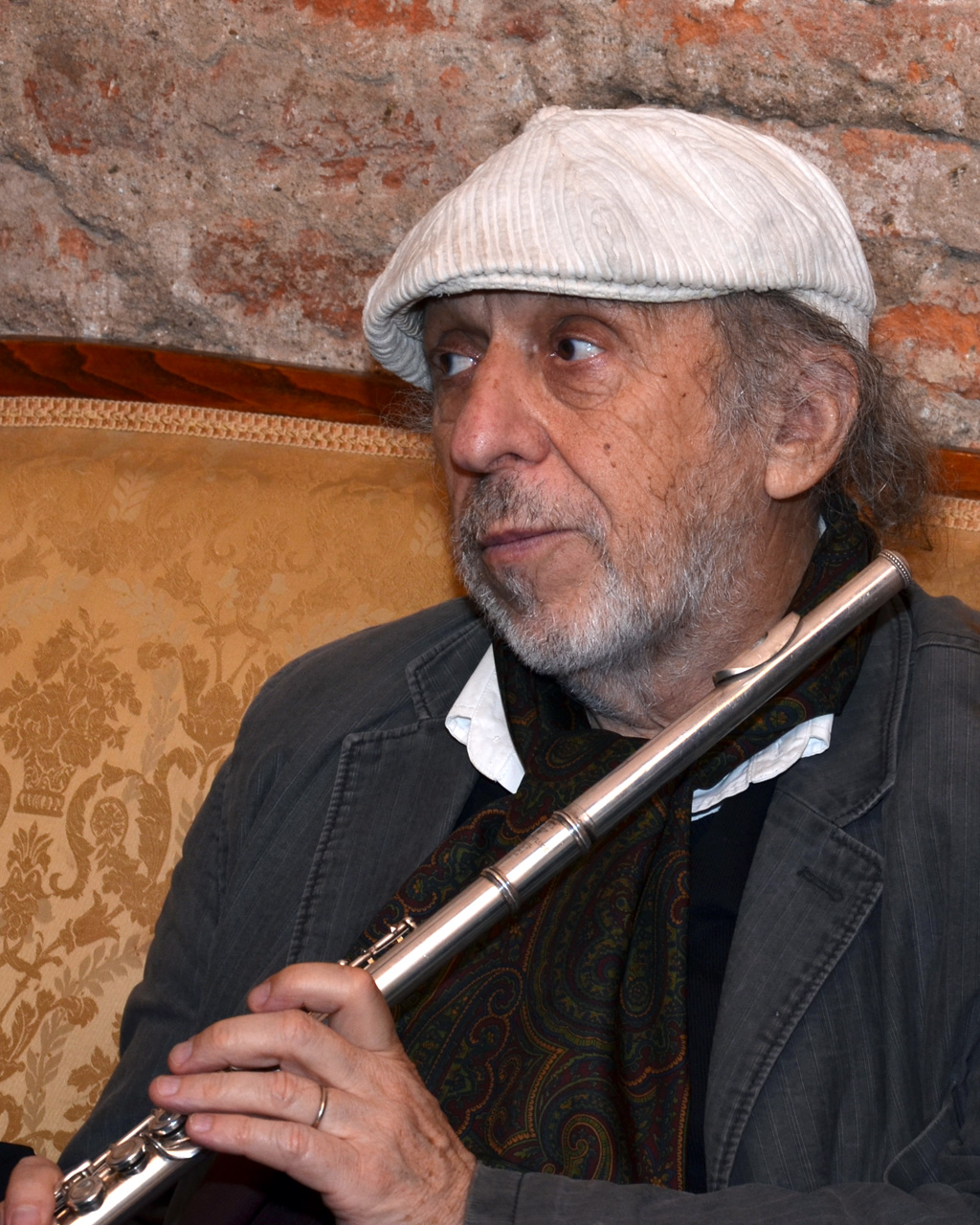
- Jiří Stivín (2015)

Background information
- Born: Jiří Stivín; 23 November 1942 (age 83); Prague, Czechoslovakia
- Genres: Jazz; Classical
- Occupations: Musician, multi-instrumentalist, composer, educator
- Instruments: Flute, Saxophone
- Labels: SQS, Konnex
- Website: jiri.stivin.cz

Jiří Stivín (born 23 November 1942 in Prague) is a Czech flute player and composer.

== Biography ==
He graduated from the Film Faculty of the Academy of Performing Arts in Prague (FAMU). He also studied composition at the Royal Academy of Music as well as at the Prague Academy of Music (AMU), and studied the flute under Milan Munclinger.

Stivín performs music from the Middle Ages, the Renaissance, and the Baroque periods. As a sololist, he performed with the Prague Symphony Orchestra, with the Slovak Chamber Orchestra, with Suk Chamber Orchestra, Barocco sempre giovane as well as with several other ensembles. He is also involved in jazz, both as a performer and as a composer. In the 1990s, he gave lectures at the Prague Conservatory and had conducted annual master classes in Barock music in the South Bohemian town of Bechyně in the summer in the 1970s-1980s.

Stivín is active in the Jazz Quartet in the Czech Republic, playing both the flute and saxophone. His large discography ranges from jazz to classical music, and his nine separate CDs of suite and chamber music recordings of Georg Philipp Telemann for recorder and flute with Naxos and Supraphon labels are the most numerous of his contemporaries performing Telemann. In 2007, Stivín was awarded the Medal of Merit by President Václav Klaus for his contributions to culture and art.

In recent years, Stivín has remained musically active well into his 80s. He continues to perform across the Czech Republic, including appearances at major events such as JazzFest Brno in November 2025.
