= Pavel Kohout (organist) =

Czech organist

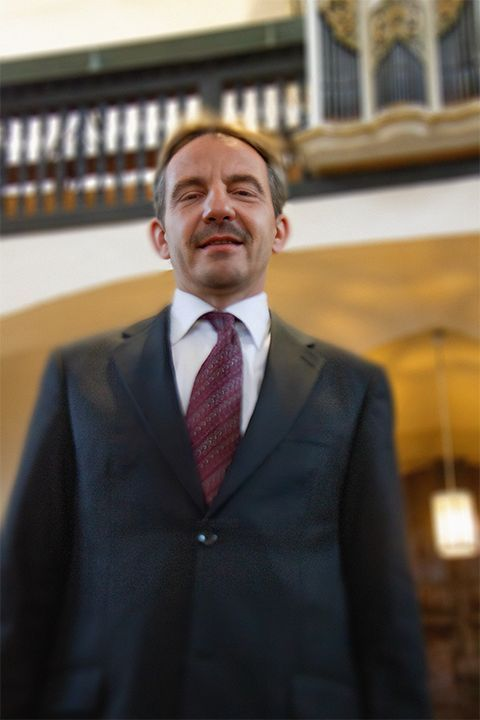
Pavel Kohout

Pavel Kohout (born 1976 in Prague, Czechoslovakia) is a Czech organist.

He is a graduate of the Prague Conservatory and the Faculty of Music of the Academy of Performing Arts in Prague under the tutelage of Prof. Jaroslav Tůma. In 1999–2000 he continued his studies at the Conservatorium van Amsterdam in the Netherlands under renowned specialist Prof. Jacques van Oortmerssen.

== Prizes ==
- Winner of both the prestigious First Prize and the J. S. Bach Prize at one of the world's largest international organ competition Musashino – Tokyo 2000, Pavel Kohout is regarded today as one of the most brilliant representatives of the new generation of European organists.

Pavel Kohout graduated from the Prague Conservatory and the Music Faculty of the Academy of Performing Arts in Prague under the guidance of Jaroslav Tůma. From 1999 he continued his studies in historical organ technique at the Conservatorium van Amsterdam in the Netherlands with renowned specialist Prof. Jacques van Oortmerssen.

Pavel Kohout has won a number of prizes at international organ competitions including first prizes at international contests in Ljubljana 1998 and Vilnius 1999 and several other special awards including the "Dancing Angel" prize of the European Music Competition for Youth.

As a recitalist and soloist, Pavel Kohout performs with various ensembles and orchestras throughout Europe, Russia, Asia, Australia and the United States. His further activities include an ongoing collaboration with Czech National Radio for the project "Historical Organs", helps provide organ tours in the Czech Republic for organ experts, presents international master classes and continues recording on CDs.

- First Prizes at international organ contests in Ljubljana 1998
- First Prizes at international organ competition Vilnius 1999
- Dancing Angel - prize of the European Music Competition for Youth.
