= Dolní Bezděkov =

- Municipality
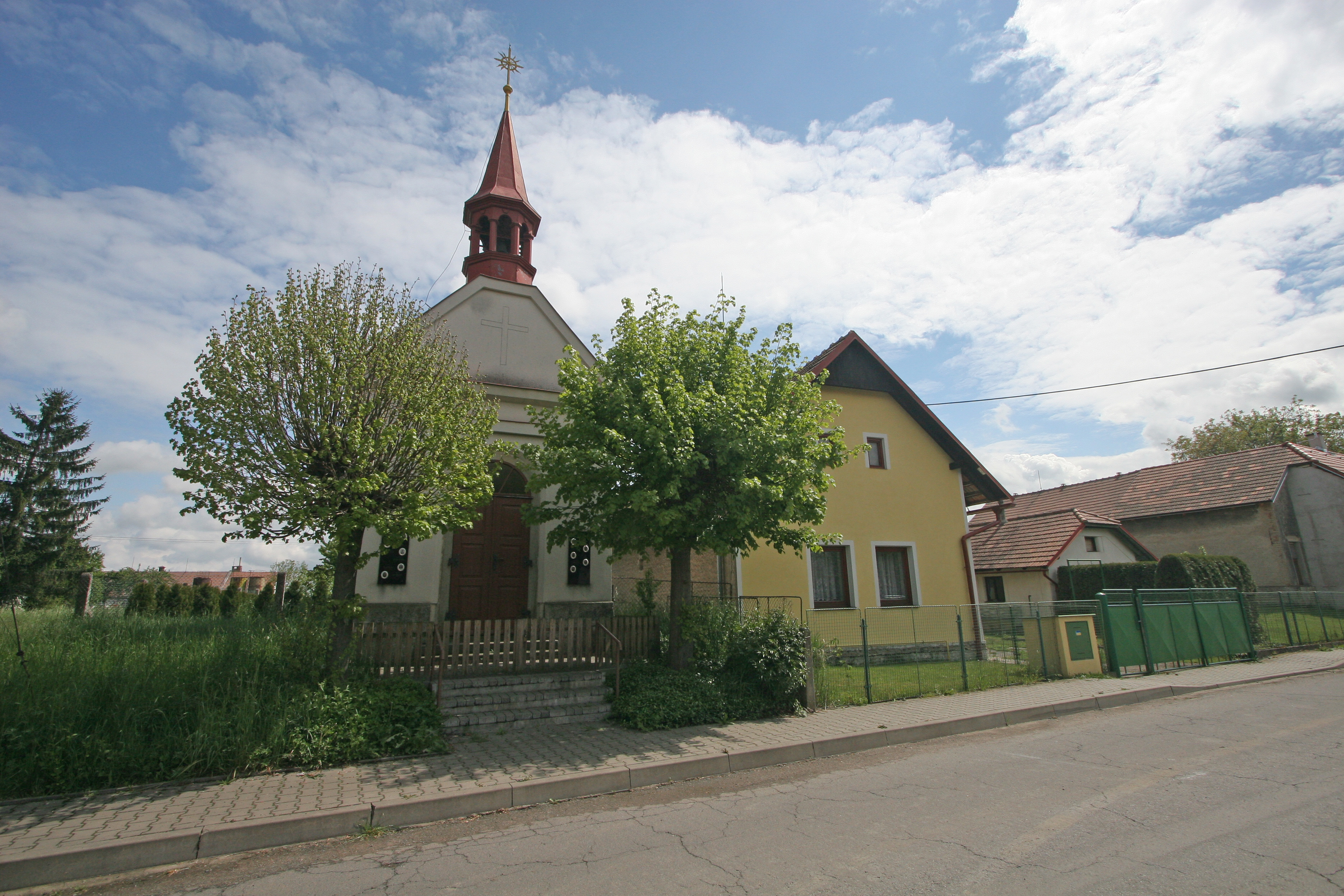
- Chapel of Saint John the Baptist

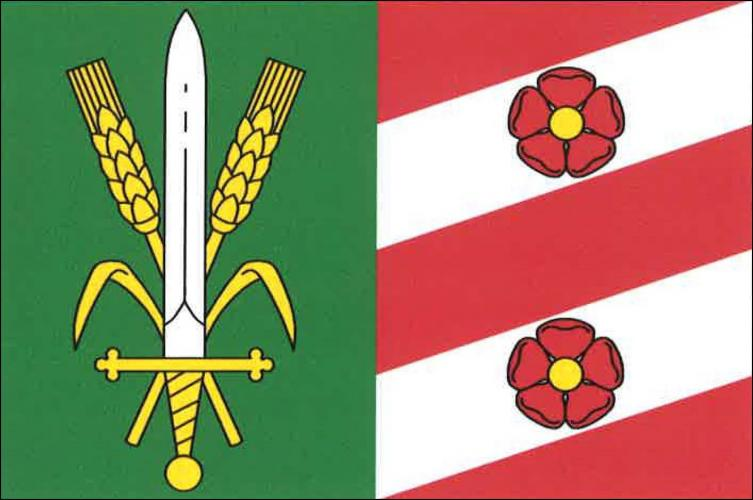
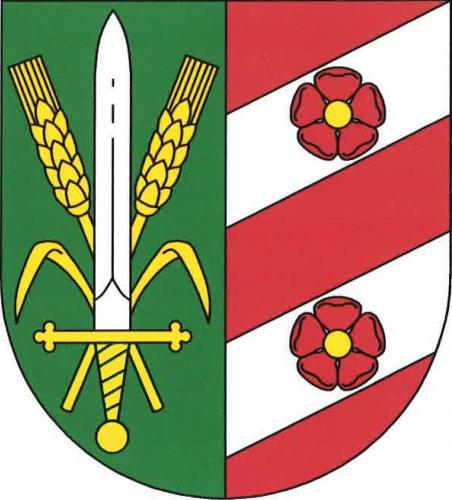
- Flag Coat of arms

- Location in the Czech Republic
- Coordinates: 49°57′38″N 15°53′2″E
- Country: Czech Republic
- Region: Pardubice
- District: Chrudim
- First mentioned: 1318

Area
  - Total: 1.75 km^{2} (0.68 sq mi)
- Elevation: 244 m (801 ft)

Population (2026-01-01)
  - Total: 271
  - Density: 155/km^{2} (401/sq mi)
- Time zone: UTC+1 (CET)
  - Summer (DST): UTC+2 (CEST)
- Postal code: 538 62
- Website: dolnibezdekov.cz

Dolní Bezděkov is a municipality and village in Chrudim District in the Pardubice Region of the Czech Republic. It has about 300 inhabitants.

== Demographics ==
Historical population
| Year | Pop. | ±% |
|---|---|---|
| 1869 | 277 | — |
| 1880 | 294 | +6.1% |
| 1890 | 352 | +19.7% |
| 1900 | 344 | −2.3% |
| 1910 | 332 | −3.5% |
| 1921 | 308 | −7.2% |
| 1930 | 308 | +0.0% |
| 1950 | 296 | −3.9% |
| 1961 | 257 | −13.2% |
| 1970 | 234 | −8.9% |
| 1980 | 210 | −10.3% |
| 1991 | 175 | −16.7% |
| 2001 | 176 | +0.6% |
| 2011 | 187 | +6.2% |
| 2021 | 225 | +20.3% |
Source: Censuses

== Notable people ==
- Václav Rabas (1933–2015), organist
