= Petr Eben International Organ Competition =

Petr Eben International Organ Competition (or The Competition for Young Organists) is held in Opava in the Czech Republic since 1978. It is named in honour of the Czech organist and composer Petr Eben (1929–2007).

The competition consists of three rounds, held at the Petr Bezruč Library, the Church of the Holy Ghost and the Cathedral of the Assumption of Our Lady in Opava.

== Jury ==
- Roberto Antonello (Italy)
- Johannes Geffert (Germany)
- Kamila Klugarová (Czech Republic)
- Susan Landale (France)
- Jon Laukvik (Germany)
- Petr Rajnoha (Czech Republic)
- Martin Sander (Germany)
- Halgeir Schiager (Norway)
- Imrich Szabó (Slovakia)
- Jaroslav Tůma (Prague)
- Václav Uhlíř (Czech Republic)

== Laureates of Competition ==
- Arnfinn Tobiassen (Norway)
- Balász Szabó (Hungary)
- Pavel Černý (Czech Republic)
- Pavel Svoboda (Czech Republic)
- Marek Kozák (Czech Republic)
- Liene Andreta Kalncinema (Latvia)
- Vladimír Roubal (Czech Republic)
- Přemysl Kšica (Czech Republic)
