= Slovak Chamber Orchestra =

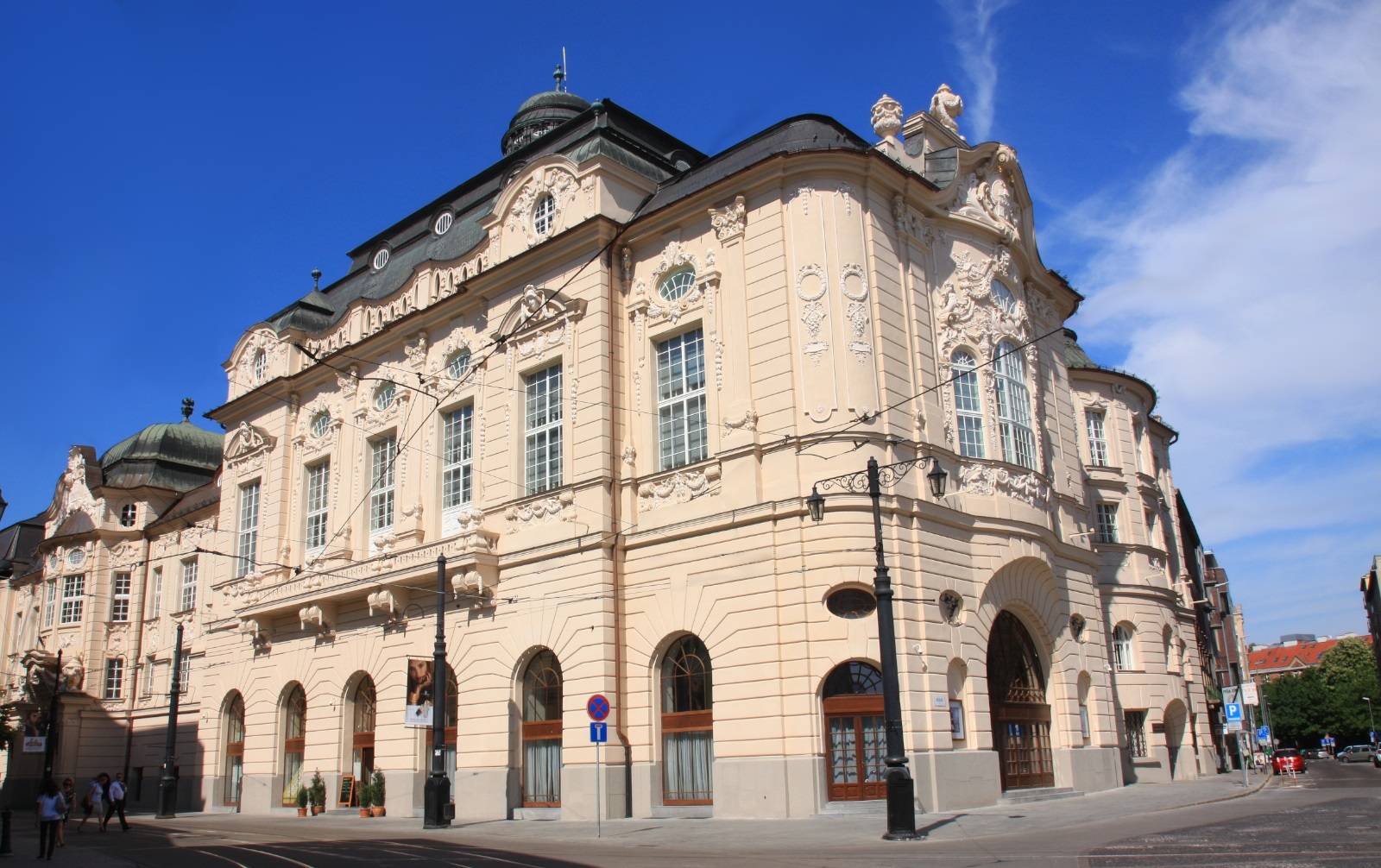
Slovak Philharmonic (National Philharmonic)

Slovak Chamber Orchestra is a chamber orchestra from Slovakia founded in 1960. Founder was violinist Bohdan Warchal. Planctus (1968) by composer Ladislav Burlas is dedicated to the Slovak Chamber Orchestra. The orchestra performs frequently at the Bratislava Music Festival.

== Leadership ==
- Bohdan Warchal
- Ewald Danel
