= European Union of Music Competitions for Youth =

The European Union of Music Competitions for Youth (EMCY) is a Europe-wide network collaborating globally, encompassing national and international music competitions for young people. Since its foundation in Brussels in 1970, EMCY develops, coordinates, and maintains a system of music competitions that serve to promote and inspire young musicians. Since its foundation in 1970, EMCY stands for musical excellence, promoting the youth and European cooperation. In order to develop the musical education of young Europeans, EMCY arranges concerts (with and without orchestra), broadcasts, tours, award ceremonies, master classes and courses for competition prize winners throughout Europe.

EMCY is established to foster youth cultural cooperation, intercultural dialogue, culture for peace, the development of young musical talents, the implementation of high-quality standards, and transparency in national and international music competitions for youth.

The activities of EMCY are guided by the fundamental values of humanity as defined in Article 2 of the EU Treaty of Lisbon, the United Nations Charter, and the Constitution of UNESCO.

EMCY supports multilateral and multicultural cooperation, democratic principles of human dignity, fundamental human values and justice, democracy, equality, mutual respect, the rule of law, basic human rights, environmental sustainability, and the pursuit of peace. EMCY remains committed to these values and supports its members in fully and comprehensively implementing them. Furthermore, EMCY is open to promoting and upholding additional values and initiatives that align with its mission and vision.

Guided by EMCY’s core values and commitment to music education and practice, EMCY collaborates with organizations worldwide that share similar values. EMCY promotes integrity through EMCY Quality Standards, supporting both established competitions and new initiatives that strive for excellence and impact. EMCY and its members work together to engage a wide range of youth audiences through a variety of projects aimed at improving music education and disseminating music to young people worldwide.

EMCY is a non-profit organization registered under German Law in Munich (Germany). It is governed by an international board elected by the General Assembly.

== EMCY board ==
The EMCY board is elected every four years at the general assembly. Current members are:

- Justas Dvarionas, Lithuania (president)
- Boris Svetiev, North Macedonia (vice president for national competitions)
- Veronika Lemishenko, Ukraine (vice president for international competitions)
- Siv Kristin Klippen, Norway (board member for national competitions)
- Patrick Ehrismann, Switzerland (board member for international competitions)

== EMCY office ==
EMCY’s registered seat (legal seat) is in Munich, Germany. The association is registered under German law (VR 16803, Munich Register of Associations). EMCY maintains an administrative office in Vilnius, Lithuania.

== General assembly ==
The EMCY general assembly gathers, in general, every two years in a different European country at the invitation of an EMCY member competition.

General assemblies have been held in (place and organiser):

- 2002 – Altea (Spain): Juventudes Musicales de España
- 2004 – Dubrovnik (Croatia): HDGPP (Croatian national competition)
- 2006 – Saint Petersburg (Russia): Mravinsky International Competition for Youth
- 2008 – Kyiv (Ukraine): International Competition for Young Pianists in Memory of Vladimir Horowitz
- 2010 – Heerlen (Netherlands): International Charles Hennen Concours
- 2012 – Ohrid (Macedonia): International Competition for Young Musicians 'Ohrid Pearls'
- 2014 – Luxembourg: Concours Luxembourgeois pour Jeunes Solistes & European Competition for Young Soloists (and INTER-NATIONAL net_works+)
- 2016 – Vilnius (Lithuania): National Lithuanian Balys Dvarionas Piano & String Competition, the International Balys Dvarionas Competition for Young Pianists and the International Jascha Heifetz Competition for Violinists (and INTER-NATIONAL net_works+)
- 2018 – Luxembourg: Concours Luxembourgeois pour Jeunes Solistes & European Competition for Young Soloists (and INTER-NATIONAL net_works+)
- 2020 – Online due to COVID-19
- 2022 – Bonn (Germany): Deutscher Musikrat & Jugend Musiziert
- 2024 – Vilnius (Lithuania): National Lithuanian Balys Dvarionas Piano & String Competition, the International Balys Dvarionas Competition for Young Pianists and Violinists, the International Jascha Heifetz Competition for Violinists, International Stasys Vainiūnas Competition for Pianists and Chamber Ensembles, International Virgilijus Noreika Competition for Singers, Center for International Cultural Projects (and B.R.A.N.D. NEW project)

== Member competitions ==
=== National competitions ===
Participation in these competitions is usually reserved for nationals or residents of the respective country. This often includes schools abroad, students at conservatoires or ex-patriates, however.

- Österreichischer Jugendmusikwettbewerb prima la musica in Austria
- podium.jazz.pop.rock... in Austria
- The Papandopulo Croatian Competition of young musicians in Croatia
- National Radio Competition of the Czech Republic 'Concertino Praga' in the Czech Republic
- Oresund Soloist in Denmark / Sweden
- Concours d'excellence – Confédération Musicale de France in France
- Jugend musiziert in Germany
- National Balys Dvarionas Piano and String Competition in Lithuania
- Concours Luxembourgoise pour Jeunes Solistes (Union Grand-Duc Adolphe (UGDA)) in Luxembourg
- Competition of the United Music and Dance Teacher of Macedonia in Macedonia
- Netherlands Violin Competition in the Netherlands
- Ungdommens Musikkmesterskap (Norwegian Music Competition for Youth) in Norway
- Prémio Jovens Músicos in Portugal
- EMCY Slovakia in Slovakia
- TEMSIG – Slovenian Music Competition for Youth in Slovenia
- Concurso Juventudes Musicales in Spain
- SJMW Classica in Switzerland
- SJMW Jazz&Pop in Switzerland

=== International competitions ===
These competitions are open to participants from all over the world. Many include categories which change every year.

- International Competition Young Virtuosos in Sofia, Bulgaria
- International Radio Competition for Young Musicians 'Concertino Praga' in Prague, Czech Republic
- Smetana International Piano Competition in Plzeň, Czech Republic
- International Competition 'Virtuosi per musica di pianoforte' in Ústí nad Labem, Czech Republic
- Aarhus International Piano Competition in Aarhus, Denmark
- International Competition of Young Pianists dedicated to the Work of F. Chopin in Narva, Estonia
- Anna Amalia Competition for Young Guitarists in Weimar, Germany
- Ettlingen International Competition for Young Pianists in Ettlingen, Germany
- International Competition for Violin, Kloster Schöntal in Schöntal, Germany
- International Franz Liszt Piano Competition in Weimar, Germany
- International Louis Spohr Competition for Young Violinists in Weimar, Germany
- Pianale International Academy and Competition in Schlitz, Germany
- International Balys Dvarionas Competition for Young Pianists and Violinists in Vilnius, Lithuania
- International Jascha Heifetz Competition for Violinists in Vilnius, Lithuania
- International Competition for Young Musicians 'Ohrid Pearls' in Ohrid, Macedonia
- International Competition for Young Pianists Artur Rubinstein in memoriam in Bydgoszcz, Poland
- Peter Toperczer International Piano Competition Košice in Košice, Slovakia
- International Competition for Young Pianists in memory of Vladimir Horowitz in Kyiv, Ukraine
- International Vladimir Krainev Young Pianists Competition in Kharkiv, Ukraine
- Yehudi Menuhin International Competition for Young Violinists in the UK
- International Competition “Glowing Harp”, Ukraine
- International Competition of Musical Art “Kharkiv Assemblies”, Ukraine
- Robert Schumann Competition for young pianists, Germany
- International piano competition of Orléans for youth ‘Brin d’herbe’, France

== Projects ==
EMCY works to help prize winners in their musical and personal development. Performance and training opportunities throughout Europe are arranged by EMCY, together with its member competitions and partners. These concerts, tours, workshops, and master classes are international meeting points for young musicians.

EMCY also holds conferences for competition organisers and music educators on particular themes.

== See also ==
- List of classical music competitions
- World Federation of International Music Competitions
- International Music Council, IMC
