= Přepychy (Pardubice District) =

- Municipality
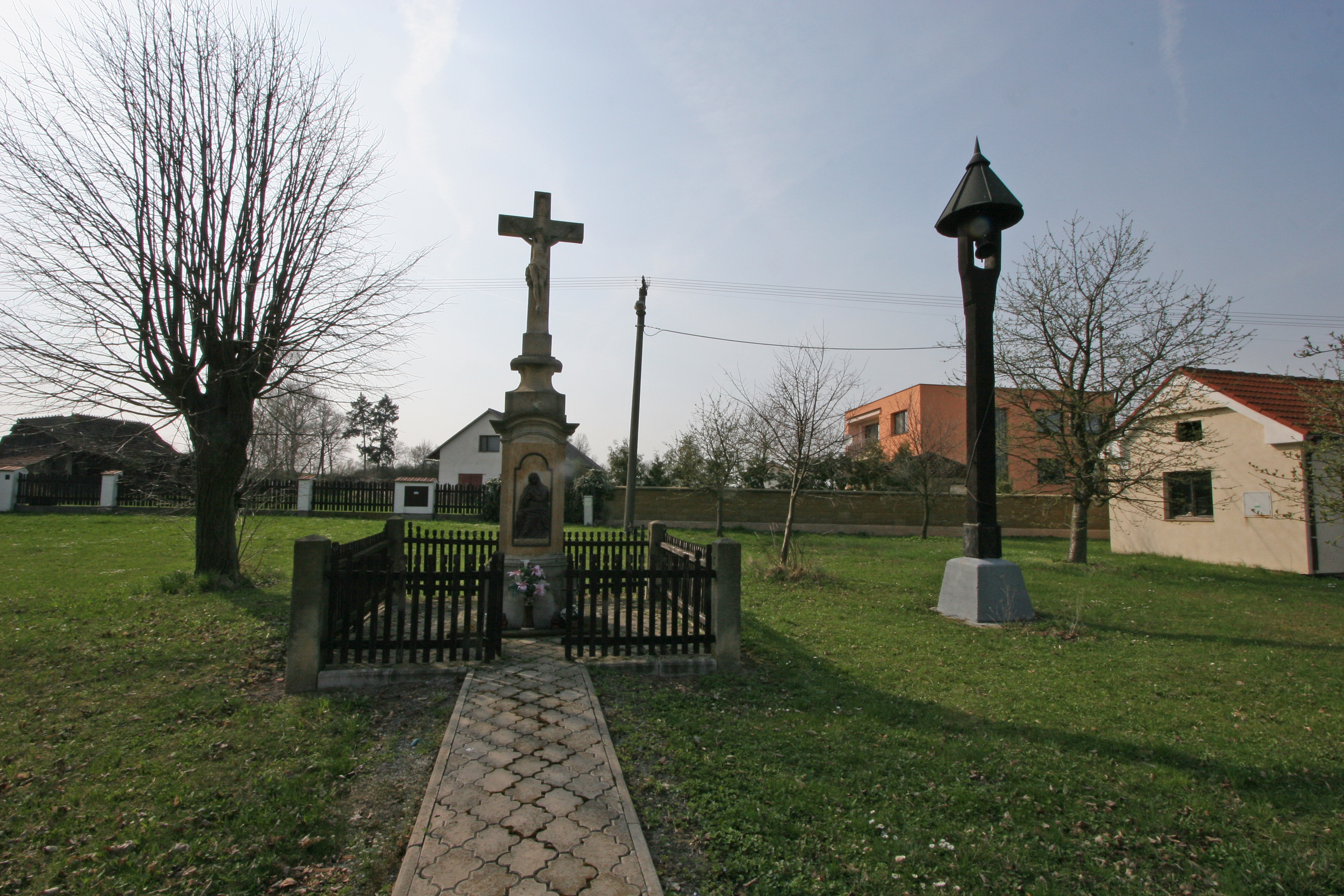
- Cross and belfry in the centre of Přepychy

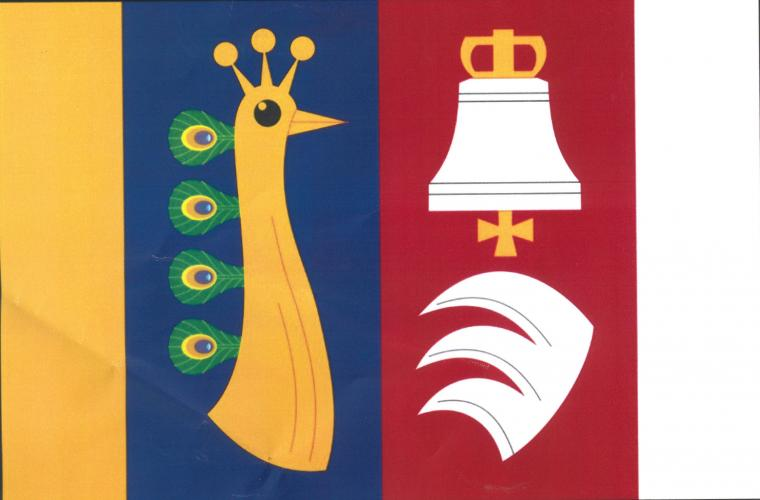
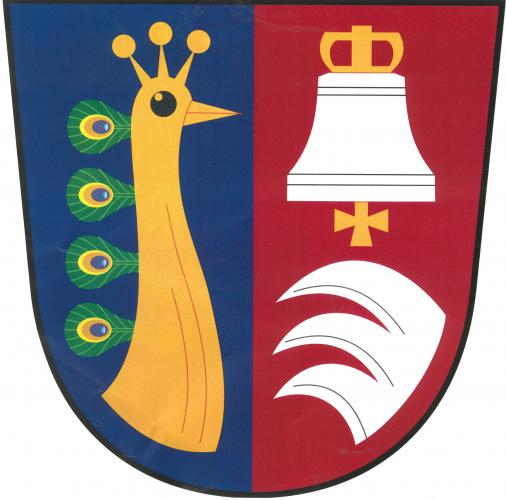
- Flag Coat of arms

- Location in the Czech Republic
- Coordinates: 50°6′23″N 15°31′12″E
- Country: Czech Republic
- Region: Pardubice
- District: Pardubice
- First mentioned: 1337

Area
  - Total: 2.55 km^{2} (0.98 sq mi)
- Elevation: 225 m (738 ft)

Population (2026-01-01)
  - Total: 91
  - Density: 36/km^{2} (92/sq mi)
- Time zone: UTC+1 (CET)
  - Summer (DST): UTC+2 (CEST)
- Postal code: 533 16
- Website: www.obec-prepychy.cz

Přepychy is a municipality and village in Pardubice District in the Pardubice Region of the Czech Republic. It has about 90 inhabitants.

== Demographics ==
Historical population
Year	Pop.	±%
1869	191	—
1880	232	+21.5%
1890	190	−18.1%
1900	195	+2.6%
1910	215	+10.3%
1921	224	+4.2%
1930	221	−1.3%
1950	161	−27.1%
1961	150	−6.8%
1970	134	−10.7%
1980	104	−22.4%
1991	91	−12.5%
2001	78	−14.3%
2011	90	+15.4%
2021	81	−10.0%
Source: Censuses
