= Ivan Straus =

Czech violinist and music pedagogue (born 1937)

Ivan Straus (born 1937) is a Czech violinist and music pedagogue. He is particularly associated with the works of Bohuslav Martinů. He has served as first violinist of the Suk Quartet since 1979. With the quartet he has toured internationally and made multiple recordings. He was previously a member of the Bohemia Trio with Josef Palenicek and Saša Večtomov from 1968-1979. He was also both a member and soloist with the Chamber Philharmonic Orchestra Pardubice (1975-1979) and the Prague Symphony Orchestra (1979-1991).

Straus is a graduate of both the Prague Conservatory, the Academy of Performing Arts in Prague (APAP), and the Moscow Conservatory. In 1964 he won the Prague Spring International Music Festival Competition. In 1968 he joined the staff of APAP, but was forced to resign his post due to political reasons seven years later. He later returned to APAP as a full professor in 1989 where he currently remains. One of his pupils is violinist Olivier Thouin.
