= Petr Eben =

Czech composer (1929–2007)

- Petr Eben, c. 2005
- Born: 22 January 1929; Žamberk, Czechoslovakia
- Died: 24 October 2007 (aged 78); Prague, Czech Republic
- Occupations: Composer, organist, pianist, cellist, choir master
- Years active: 1950–2007

Petr Eben (22 January 1929 – 24 October 2007) was a Czech composer of modern and contemporary classical music, and an organist and choirmaster.

== Life and career ==
Born in Žamberk in northeastern Bohemia, Eben spent most of his childhood and early adolescence in Český Krumlov in southern Bohemia. There he studied piano, and later cello and organ. The years of World War II were especially difficult for the young man. Although Eben was raised as a Catholic, his father was a Jew and thus fell foul of the National Socialist occupiers of his homeland. In 1943, aged 14, Eben was captured and imprisoned by the Nazis in Buchenwald, remaining there for the duration of the war.

After being released, he was admitted to the Prague Academy for Music, and there he studied piano with František Rauch and composition with Pavel Bořkovec. He graduated in 1954. Beginning in 1955 Eben taught for many years in the music history department at Charles University in Prague. Between 1977 and 1978 he was professor of composition at the Royal Northern College of Music, Manchester. In 1990 he became professor of composition in the Academy of Performing Arts in Prague and President of the Prague Spring Festival.

Eben refused to join the Czech Communist Party and continued openly attending church, thus forfeiting many career advancements before 1989. After the Communist government crumbled, however, he was given several important appointments and awards, among them presidency of the Prague Spring Festival (1989) and the Medal of Merit (2002). Among Eben's most important late works is his 1992–1993 oratorio "Posvátná znamení" (Sacred Symbols). Despite declining health from a stroke in his final years, Eben remained busy, composing mostly organ and choral works. He died in Prague on 24 October 2007.

Eben's compositions are often performed in both Europe and overseas, especially in the United States, Canada, Japan and Australia. In 1991, Eben was awarded the title of Knight of the French Ministry of Culture, Arts and Letters. Two years earlier he became honorary president of the Society for Sacred Music. An international organ competition bearing his name has been organized since 2004 in Opava.

His son David Eben is the founder and director of Schola Gregoriana Pragensis, an a cappella male voice choir.

== Works ==
Over more than half a century Eben produced a good deal of music in diverse genres. His earliest large works included his 1954 First Organ Concerto (the Second came in 1984) and Concerto for Piano and Orchestra (1960–1961). He wrote numerous vocal, choral, symphonic, piano, and chamber works, but it was organ music which remained his greatest love and in which he was most prolific.

Among Eben's biggest projects were the oratorio Apologia Socratus, the ballet Curse and Benediction (Kletby a dobrořečení), written for the Holland Festival 1983, the orchestral works Hours of the Night (Noční hodiny) and Prague Nocturne (Pražské nokturno), for the Vienna Philharmonic, the Organ Concerto No. 2 for the dedication of the new organ for Radio Vienna, the mass Missa cum populo for the Avignon Festival, the oratorio Holy Symbols (Posvátná znamení) for Salzburg Cathedral, and the opera Jeremiah (intended for church, not theatrical, performance). He also wrote children's songs such as Sníh, a song about snow which won an award for Best Children's Choir Song in Illinois.

Eben was considered a master at improvisation on the organ and piano, but composition remained his main area of interest. However, many of his organ compositions in particular were based on his public improvisations. These improvisations were the origin for the Two Choral Fantasies, Landscapes of Patmos, and Job. Eben improvised and developed a cycle of organ movements in the years from 1991 to 2003 based on excerpts from John Comenius' famous book, Labyrinth of the World and the Paradise of the Heart that became a published work in response to positive reception.

His music has been widely performed and recorded since about 1980, with his popularity still apparently on the rise. Stylistically, his musical language can be considered as "neoexpressionistic" in many ways, however in some works we can hear some kind of new forms of impressionistic tendencies. He is often compared with Olivier Messiaen (the comparison is valid to some extent, in that both men wrote a great deal of organ music, and quite often have examples of their organ output included in the same recitals), but overall his style is less consistently experimental and voluptuous than Messiaen's.

== Recordings ==
The majority of Eben's works has been published by Czech label Supraphon. Some recordings of his organ pieces were performed by himself. The Norwegian organist Halgeir Schiager has recorded five CDs of Petr Eben's organ music on Hyperion Records. The German organist Gunther Rost has recorded 6 discs of Petr Eben's organ music on label Motette. The interpretation recorded on this CD-SACD series was largely influenced by the composer's personal suggestions and comments. The series compiles all of Eben's works for solo organ which have been published to this date, played by Gunther Rost on various contemporary instruments. The speaker in both cycles, Job (vol. I) and The Labyrinth of the World and the Paradise of the Heart (vol. V, published in 2008), is Gert Westphal, one of Germany's most important contemporary reciters. Some of his CDs feature works by Sieglinde Ahrens. Petr Eben's Moto Ostinato from "Sunday Music" is played by English organist Gillian Weir in her "The King of Instruments" series (Priory Records' PRDVD 7001). The Canadian organist Philip Crozier, playing the Fulda Cathedral organ, has also recorded a number of Eben's works on the Azimuth label. Swedish jazz pianist Bobo Stenson included two versions of Eben's "Song of Ruth" on his 2008 trio album Cantando.

== Compositions ==
- Missa adventus et quadragesimae, 1952
- Simphonia Gregoriana (Organ Concerto No. 1), 1954
- Sunday Music, organ, 1957–59
- Hořká hlína (Bitter Earth), cantata, 1959–60
- Piano Concerto, 1960–61
- Laudes, organ, 1964
- Ordinarium missae, 1966
- Apologia Socratus, oratorio, 1967
- Truvérská mše (Trouvere Mass), 1968–69
- Vox clamantis, 1969
- Ten Preludes on Chorales of the Bohemian Brethren, organ, 1971–73
- Pragensia, cantata, 1972
- Noční hodiny (Hours of the Night), sinfonia, 1975
- Faust, incidental music, 1976
- Hamlet, incidental music, 1976–77
- Pocta Karlu IV., cantata, 1978
- Mutationes, organ, 1980
- Rorate coeli, Fantasy for viola and organ, 1982
- Missa cum populo, 1982
- Kletby a dobrořečení (Curses and Blessings), ballet, 1983
- Hommage à Dietrich Buxtehude, organ, 1987
- Job, organ, 1987
- A Festive Voluntary: Variations on Good King Wenceslas, organ, 1987
- Two Invocations (for trombone and organ), 1988
- Organ Concerto No. 2, 1988
- Prague Te Deum, 1989 (for mixed choir, 4 brass instruments, timpani and percussion or organ)
- Biblical Dances, organ, 1990–91
- Posvátná znamení (Sacred Symbols), oratorio, 1992–93
- Proprium festivum monasteriense, hymn, 1993
- Amen — es werde wahr: Choralphantasie für Orgel, organ, 1994
- Momenti d'organo, organ, 1994
- Hommage à Henry Purcell, organ, 1994–95
- Jeremiah, opera, 1996–97
- Campanae gloriosae, organ, 1999
- The Labyrinth of the World and the Paradise of the Heart, organ and speaker, 2002

== Bibliography ==
- K. Vondrovicová, Petr Eben, Prague 1993
