= Přepychy (Rychnov nad Kněžnou District) =

- Municipality
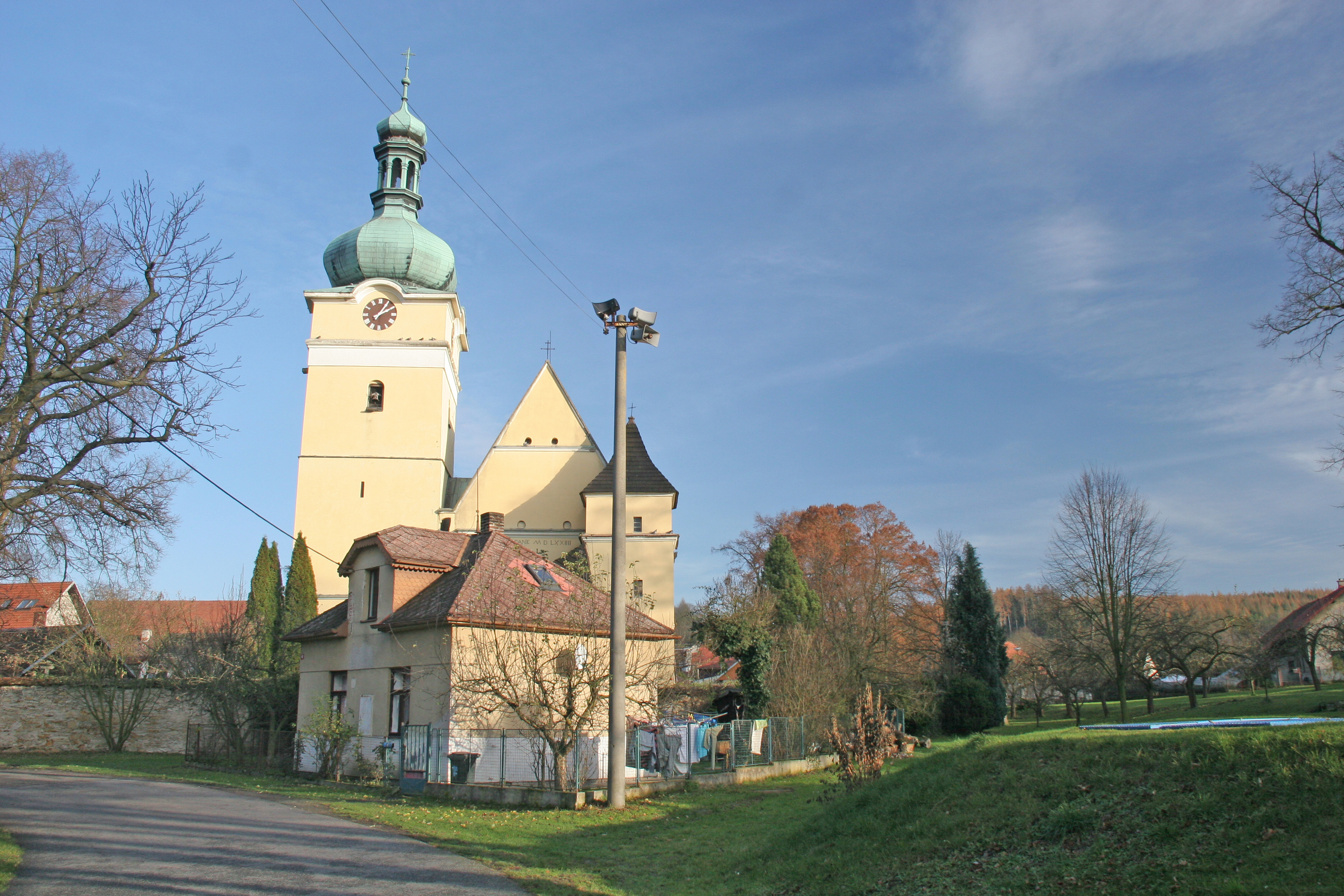
- Church of Saint Procopius

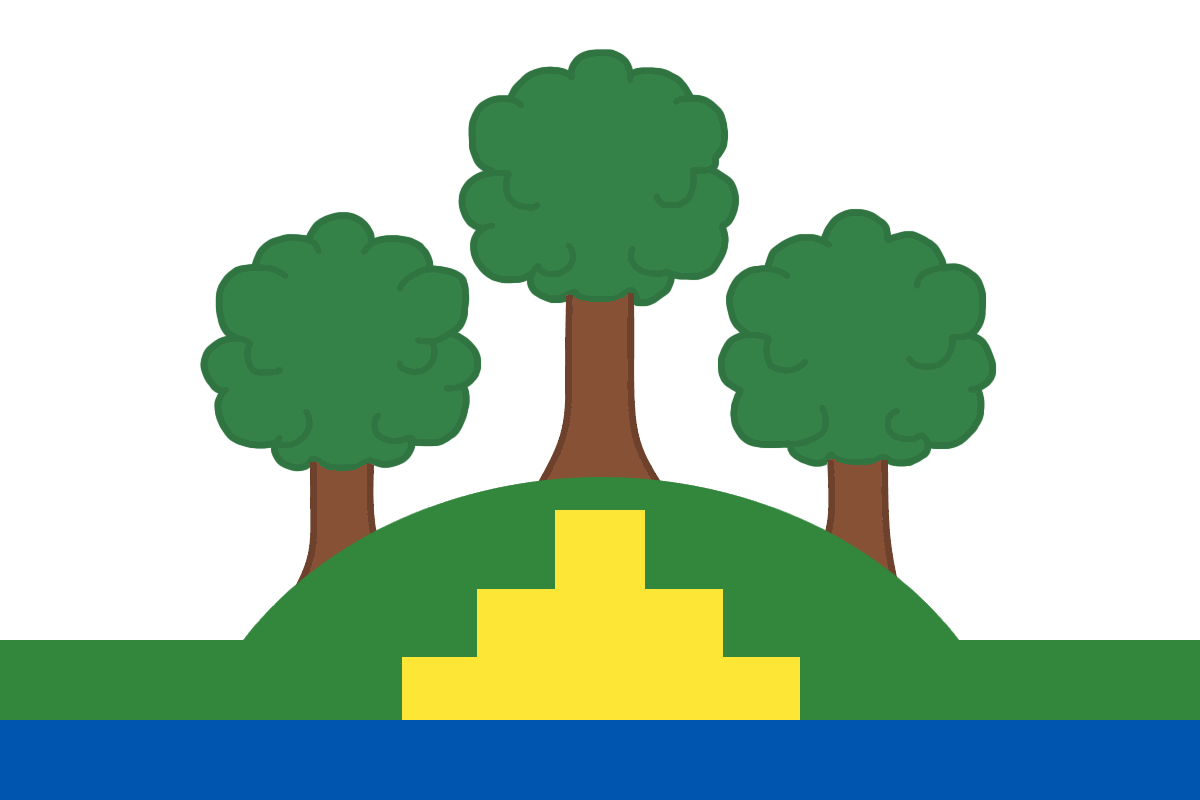
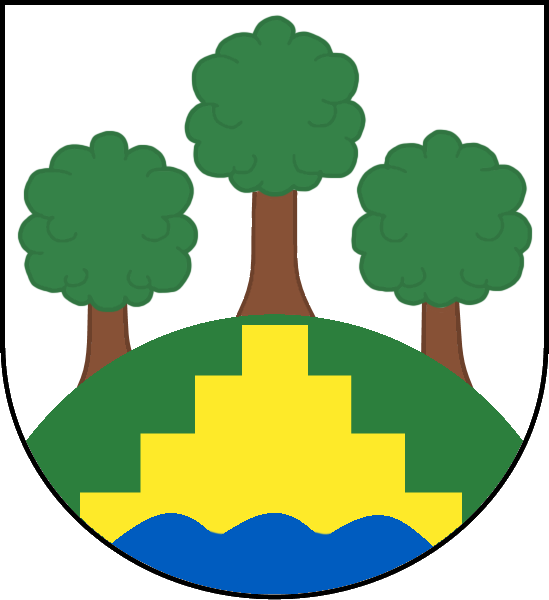
- Flag Coat of arms

- Location in the Czech Republic
- Coordinates: 50°14′9″N 16°6′24″E
- Country: Czech Republic
- Region: Hradec Králové
- District: Rychnov nad Kněžnou
- First mentioned: 1355

Area
  - Total: 9.37 km^{2} (3.62 sq mi)
- Elevation: 305 m (1,001 ft)

Population (2026-01-01)
  - Total: 639
  - Density: 68.2/km^{2} (177/sq mi)
- Time zone: UTC+1 (CET)
  - Summer (DST): UTC+2 (CEST)
- Postal code: 517 32
- Website: prepychy.cz

Přepychy is a municipality and village in Rychnov nad Kněžnou District in the Hradec Králové Region of the Czech Republic. It has about 600 inhabitants.

== Demographics ==
Historical population
Year	Pop.	±%
1869	907	—
1880	1,058	+16.6%
1890	1,013	−4.3%
1900	910	−10.2%
1910	877	−3.6%
1921	896	+2.2%
1930	815	−9.0%
1950	677	−16.9%
1961	657	−3.0%
1970	617	−6.1%
1980	569	−7.8%
1991	631	+10.9%
2001	594	−5.9%
2011	639	+7.6%
2021	667	+4.4%
Source: Censuses
