= Jaroslav Tůma =

Czech organist

Jaroslav Tůma (born 1956, in Prague, Czech Republic) is a Czech organist.

== Life and career ==
This organist, clavichord, harpsichordist and pianoforte player graduated from the Prague Conservatory and from the Faculty of Music of the Academy of Performing Arts in Prague (Milan Šlechta organ, and Zuzana Růžičková harpsichord). He won first prizes in organ improvisation competitions in Nuremberg in 1980 and in the Dutch city of Haarlem in 1986. He is also the laureate of a number of organ interpretation competitions, 1978 Linz, 1979 the Prague Spring competition and 1980 the Leipzig Bach competition. Through 1990 - 1993, he performed the complete works of Johann Sebastian Bach. He records for Czech radio, Czech television, and numerous recording companies. His discography includes more than twenty solo recordings. He has collaborated with Giedré Lukšaité-Mrázková, Irena Troupová, Barocco sempre giovane, Bohuslav Matoušek etc.

He is Professor of the Faculty of Music of the Academy of Performing Arts in Prague (his students: Petr Rajnoha, Pavel Kohout, Pavel Černý, Pavel Svoboda, Drahoslav Gric etc.) and is often invited to sit on juries of international organ or harpsichord competitions, e.g. the International Competition of the Prague Spring Festival, Petr Eben International Organ Competition in Opava, Internationale Orgelwoche in Nuremberg, Internationaal Orgelimprovisatieconcours in the Dutch city of Haarlem, and the Georg Muffat Competition in Schlägel in Austria.
