= Aleš Bárta =

Czech organist

Aleš Bárta (born 1960 in Rychnov nad Kněžnou) is a Czech organist.

He began his studies at the Brno Conservatory (under Josef Pukl) and continued at the Academy of Music in Prague (Václav Rabas). He appears as soloist with leading Czech symphony and chamber orchestras, among them the Prague Symphony orchestra FOK, the Czech Radio Symphony Orchestra, the Prague Chamber Orchestra and the Czech Philharmonic. During his tour of Japan his appearance marked the opening of a new concert hall in Yokohama.

== Prizes ==
- 1982 - won the Anton Bruckner International Organ Competition in Linz
- 1983 - prize winner at the Franz Liszt International Organ Competition in Budapest
- 1984 - absolute winner of the Prague Spring International Organ Competition
