= International Performers Competition Brno =

The International Performers Competition Brno (Czech: Mezinárodní interpretační soutěž Brno) is a competition for musicians held at the Brno International Music Festival in Brno in the Czech Republic.

The Brno International Music Festival has been held at the end of September and the beginning of October each year since 1966. The festival is a member of the European Festivals Association (since 1993). The first International Performers' Competition was held in 1996 and has since become a regular event at the festival. There are six prizes totalling CZK 200,000.

== Disciplines, Laureates and Jurors ==
- Organ: Petr Čech, Pavel Svoboda (Czech republic), Anna Pikulska (Poland)
- French Horn: Zoltán Szöke (Hungary), Pablo Lago Soto (Spain)
- Tuba: Sergio Finca Quiros (Spain), Carolyn Jantsch (USA)
- Double Bass: Stanislau Anishchanka (Belarus), Artem Chirkov (Russia)
- Percussion: Sabrina Suk Wai Ma (Hongkong)

=== Jurors ===
James Gourlay, Francis Orval, Susan Landale, Gillian Weir, Helmut Deutsch, David Heyes, Stefan Schäfer, James Gourlay

=== Cycle of competition categories ===
- 1996 French horn
- 1997 Pipe organ
- 1998 Double bass
- 1999 Percussion
- 2000 Tuba
- 2001 French horn
- 2002 Pipe organ
- 2003 Double bass
- 2004 Percussion duo
- 2005 Tuba
- 2006 French horn
- 2007 Pipe organ
- 2008 Double bass
- 2009 Percussion - Marimba
- 2010 Tuba
- 2011 French horn
- 2012 Pipe organ
- 2013 Double bass
- 2014 Percussion

== Concert performances for laureates ==
- performing at the:
  - Brno International Music Festival
  - Brno Philharmonic Orchestra
  - South Bohemian Chamber Philharmonic Orchestra České Budějovice
  - Philharmonic Orchestra Hradec Králové
  - Janáček Philharmonic Orchestra Ostrava
  - Moravian Philharmonic Orchestra Olomouc
