= David Titterington =

British musician and educator

David Titterington is a British organist, educator and artistic director.

== Early life and education ==
David Titterington was born on 10 January 1958, the son of Geoffrey Bridge Titterington and Claire Elizabeth Titterington (née Parsons).

He studied piano, violin and viola in the Junior Department of the Northern School of Music with John Foster, Anne Brindley and Ida Carroll. He went on to study organ with William Morgan and Derrick Cantrell of Manchester Cathedral. For many of his school years he played viola in the Lancashire Schools Symphony Orchestra and chamber ensembles.

He was an organ scholar at Pembroke College, Oxford (BA Hons 1980, MA 1984), and at the Conservatoire de Rueil-Malmaison, Paris with Susan Landale and Marie-Claire Alain, where he was awarded a Premier Prix (à l’unanimité avec les félicitations du jury) in 1984 and Prix d'Excellence in 1985.

== Career ==
Titterington has been professor of organ at London's Royal Academy of Music since 1991, where he has been Head of organ studies since 1996. In 2017 he was conferred as professor with a personal chair from the University of London. He has also been Honorary Visiting Professor of Organ at Liszt Ferenc Academy of Music in Budapest since 1997. Between 1993 and 2010, he gave annual masterclasses at the Dartington International Summer School.

Since 2007 he has been artistic and executive director of the St Albans International Organ Festival.

Since 1989 he has been associated with London's Dutch Church where he has been director of music for many years.

In 1992, for the Foreign & Commonwealth Office, he was artistic director of the European Organ Festival and Competition.

He has been organ consultant to Pembroke College, Oxford from 1993 to 1995; Chapel Royal at Tower of London from 1997 to 2000; St Catharine's College, Cambridge from 2000 to 2001; Sidney Sussex College, Cambridge from 2007 to 2016; Canterbury Cathedral from 2007 to 2010. He has held the post of Organ Consultant at King's College London from 2016, and at St Botolph-without-Bishopsgate from 2019. He was organ curator at St John's Smith Square from 2012 to 2022.

Other teaching positions include:

- Honorary professor at Liszt Ferenc State University (1999)
- Distinguished Visiting Professor at Tokyo University of the Arts (2018)
- Visiting Professor at Korea National University of Arts (2016, 2022)
- Visiting Professor at Yonsei University, Seoul (2018).

He is a co-founder (with Dinah Molloy-Thompson) and trustee of the Eric Thompson Charitable Trust for Organists and a Liveryman of the Musicians' Company. He is a member of the Senior Common Room at Pembroke College, Oxford.

Awards include

- Honorary Fellow of Bolton Institute of Higher Education (1992)
- Honorary Fellow of the Royal College of Organists (1999)
- Honorary Fellow of King's College London (2018)
- Honorary Member of the Royal Academy of Music (2008)
- Hon. DMus of Liszt Ferenc Academy of Music, Budapest (2000)
- Honorary Doctor of the University of Huddersfield (2010)
- Honorary Doctor of Arts, University of Bolton (2018)
- elected Fellow Commoner Sidney Sussex College, Cambridge 2018

== Performances ==
Titterington appears in recitals and concertos festivals worldwide.

He made his debut at the BBC Proms on 6 August 1990 with a solo recital which included a Proms commission from Diana Burrell, Arched forms with bells. At the BBC Proms 2000, he played in the UK premiere on 1 September 2000 of Hans Werner Henze’s Ninth Symphony with the BBC Symphony Orchestra and in the BBC Proms 2009, he gave his second solo recital (25 July 2009) of works by Elgar and Peter Dickinson.

Royal Festival Hall recitals include his debut in 1986 followed by a recital in the 50th anniversary recital series which included the premiere of Stephen Montague’s Toccare Incandescent commissioned by the Southbank Centre. In February 2016, his recital included the world premiere of a Southbank commissioned work by Sally Beamish, Chaconne.
