= Luboš Sluka =

Czech Contemporary Composer (born 1928)

Luboš Sluka (born September 13, 1928, in Opočno) is a Czech contemporary composer.

== Life and career ==
Lubos Sluka was admitted to Prague Conservatory where he completed his studies in three subjects - percussion, conducting and composition. In 1951, Sluka was chosen as Arthur Honegger's student, as well as George Auric's assistant. However, his stay in Paris has been cancelled due to political reasons. He graduated at the Academy of Performing Arts in Prague in composition with Jaroslav Řídký and Pavel Borkovec, film music with Václav Trojan in 1959.

From 1962 to 1963, he was employed as the program editor in Czech Television, from 1963 till 1969 he'd worked in the music publishing company Panton. In February 1992 was voted the chairman of the Society of composers and in January 1995 the chairman of the whole Association of musical artists and scientists of the Czech Republic. Sluka's work is very complex and diverse (more than 350 compositions). He had also paid a great heed to vocal and vocal-symphonic compositions (8 song cycles, 5 cantatas), film and television productions (70 full-length films, 30 television productions, 3 musicals and 5 TV serials), as well as to orchestral music (80 pieces) and to so called popular music (80 compositions).

An asteroid 27978 Lubosluka is named after him.

== Works ==
- 0001 Sonata per violoncello e pianoforte
- 0002 Sonata per fagotto e pianoforte
- 0003 Sonata per clarinetto basso e pianoforte
- 0004 Sonata per saxofono e pianoforte
- 0005 Sonata per pianoforte
- 0006 I. Quartetto d´archi (Partitura e parti)
- 0007 II. Quartetto d´archi (Partitura e parti)
- 0008 Miniature per Quartetto d´archi(Partitura e parti)
- 0009 Quartetto per flauto, violino, viola, violoncello (Partitura e parti)
- 0010 Sunset suite for string quartet (The second version for string quartet + contrabass) (Partitura e parti)
- 0011 Suiete to the Memory of Jaroslav Ježek per due violoni, viola violoncello contarbasso (Partitura e parti)
- 0012 In Memory of Jaroslav Ježek per 5 violoncelli
- 0013 Nénie per 5 violoncelli (Partitura e parti)
- 0014 Quintetto per flauto, oboe, clarinetto, corno e fagotto (Infanzia) (Partitura e parti)
- 0015 II. Trio per violino, violoncello e pianoforte
- 0016 Racconto (Pohádka) per flauto, chitarra e violoncello
- 0017 Partita per tre flauti
- 0018 Pastorale per violino, viola e pianoforte
- 0019 Pastorale per violino, violoncello e pianoforte
- 0020 Pastorale per violino, clarinetto e pianoforte
- 0021 Pastorale per flauto, viola e pianoforte
- 0022 Pastorale per flauto, violoncello e pianoforte
- 0023 Pastorale per flauto, clarinetto e pianoforte
- 0024 Pastorale per clarinetto, viola e pianoforte
- 0025 Pastorale per clarinetto, violoncello e pianoforte
- 0026 Due pezzi per violino e pianoforte (Dva elegické kusy)
- 0027 Due notturni per violoncello e pianoforte
- 0028 Gabbione per due usignuoli (Klec pro dva slavíky) per violoncello (fagotto ossia basclarinetto)e pianoforte
- 0029 Con animo per violoncello e pianoforte
- 0030 Con animo per fagotto e pianoforte
- 0031 Con animo per clarinetto basso e pianoforte
- 0032 Suita in G per oboe (ossia flauto e clarinetto) e pianoforte
- 0033 Tre composizioni per oboe (clarinetto) e pianoforte
- 0034 Tre composizioni per clarinetto basso e pianoforte
- 0035 Andante con moto per oboe e pianoforte
- 0036 Andante con moto per violoncello e pianoforte
- 0037 Andante con moto per fagotto e pianoforte
- 0038 Andante con moto per clarinetto basso e pianoforte
- 0039 Variazioni per pianoforte
- 0040 Ricapitolazioni per pianoforte
- 0041 Cesty pro varhany (Wege für Orgel – Ways for Organ)(Cesta stínu, Cesta ticha, Cesta uzdravení)
- 0042 Sonata per violino e pianoforte
- 0043 D-S-C-H per clarinettobasso e pianoforte
- 0044 D-S-C-H per violoncello e pianoforte
- 0045 D-S-C-H per contrabasso e pianoforte
- 0046 D-S-C-H per saxofono e pianoforte
- 0047 Malá klavírní suita - Kleine Klaviersuitte – Small Suitte for Piano
- 0048 Jaro a mládí – Frühling und Jugend – Spring and Youth - Suite per pianoforte
- 0049 Hry a sny – Spiele und Träume – Games and Dreams per pianoforte
- 0050 Hrátky - Plauderstündchen – Amusements per pianoforte
- 0051 Chvilky u klavíru – Kurzweil am Klavier – Moments at the Piano
- 0052 Klavírní brevíř pro mladé i starší pianisty – Klavierbrevier für kleine und grosse Pianisten – Piano Breviary for young and older Pianists
- 0053 Suita piccola per chitarra
- 0054 Duettini per due violoncelli
- 0055 Duettini per flauto (flauto a becco, clarinetto ossia violino) e fagotto (ossia violoncello) - ossia pianoforte solo
- 0056 Suita in G per oboe e archi (Partitura)
- 0057 Serenati per orchestra d´archi (Partitura)
- 0058 Ricordo (Vzpomínka) per grande orchestra (Partitura)
- 0059 Oravská balada, poema sinfonico (Partitura)
- 0060 Via della guarigione (Cesta uzdravení), meditazione sinfonico (Partitura)
- 0061 Vejménu života, kantáta pro mužský sbor, recitátora, a symfonický orchestr – In Namen des Lebens, Kantate für Männerchor, Sprecher und Sinfonieorchester (Text S.K.Neumann)(Partitura)
- 0062 LIALA, Valzer di concerto per violino
- a) e grande orchestra (Partitura)
- b) per violino e pianoforte
- 0063 Suita per grande orchestra (Partitura)
- 0064 Vyznání, monolog pro hluboký hlas a smyčce na slova Michelangela Buonarrotiho v překladu Jana Vladislava Die Konfession für tiefe Stimme und Streichorchester auf Worte des Michelangelo Buonarroti Freie deutsche Nachdichtung von Helena Medková
- a) pro hluboký hlas a smyčcový orchestr (Partitura) - für tiefe Stimme und Streichorchestr (Partitura)
- b) pro hluboký hlas a varhany - für tiefe Stimme und Orgel
- c) pro střední hlas a varhany - für mittlere Stimme und Orgel
- 0065 Beránci a beránky, hrátky pro dětský sbor, sóla, pastýře (recitace) a komorní orchestr na slova Václava Fischera (Partitura e parti)
- 0066 Zpíváno dětem, cyklus písní pro vyšší hlas
- a) a klavír na slova J.V.Sládka - Kindern gesungen, Liederzyklus für höhere Stimme und klavier Deutsche Übersetzung von Adolf Langer
- b) pro dvouhlasý dětský sbor a klavír - für Kindernchor (2-3 Stimmen) und Klavier Deutsche Übersetzung von Adolf Langer
- 0067 Radosti není nikdy dost, kantáta pro dětský sbor a klavír na slova Vladimíra Šefla(Partitura e parti)
- 0068 Praha – Tokio, kantáta pro dětský sbor a klavír na slova Václava Fischera (Partitura e parti)
- 0069 Čekání na Ježíška pro dětský nebo ženský sbor, klarinet a klavír na slova Václava Fischera
- 0070 Šest písní na slova moravské lidové poezie pro vyšší hlas a klavír – Sechs Lieder nach mährischer Volkspoesie für höhere Stimme und Klavier
- 0071 Tři písně na slova švédské lidové poezie pro baryton a klavír – Drei schwedische Lieder für Bariton und Klavier
- 0072 Písně renesanční pro střední hlas a klavír (Angelo Poliziano, Tarquato Tasso, Michelangelo Buonarroti v překladu Jana Vladislava) – Rennaissancelieder für mittlere Stimme und Klavier (Angelo Poliziano, Tarquato Tasso, Michelangelo Buonarroti) Deutsche Übersetzung von Bedřich Eben
- 0073 Tři zpěvy pro střední hlas a klavír (J.W.von Goethe, Otakar Theer, Vladimír Kučera)– Drei Gesänge für mittlere Stimme und Klavier (J.W.von Goethe, Otakar Theer, Vladimír Kučera)
- 0074 Květomluva, cyklus písní pro střední hlas a klavír na slova Roberta Desnose ve volném přebásnění Kamila Bednáře – Blumensprache, Liederzyklus für mittlere Stimme und Klavier nach Versen von Robert Desnos.Freie deutsche Nachdichtung zur gegebenen Music von Adolf Langer
- 0075 Kladské písně a balady – Lieder und Balladen aus Glatz
- a) pro střední hlas a klavír, für mittlere Stimme und klavier
- b) pro hluboký hlas a klavír, für tiefere Stimme und Klavier
- 0076 Na konci tisíciletí, tři smíšené sbory na slova českých básníků (V. Závada, F.Nechvátal, K.Bednář)
- 0077 Návraty – Rückkehren – Returns – Ritorni – 8 composizioni i per pianoforte
- 0078 Devatero – Nove composizioni per pianoforte
- 0079 Vigilie per organo
- 0080 Slavíček v keřku spievá – Die Nachtigall singt im Gebüsch – Nightingale in the Sky – composizioni per flauto a becco (ad lib.flauto piccolo, flauto, oboe, clarinetto, violino)e pianoforte
- 0081 4 Ave Maria per canto e organo e O sanctissima per canto, violino e organo
- 0082 Canti (Zpěvy) per tromba e organo
- 0083 Due valzeri per pianoforte
- 0084 Jako tehdy, 8 písní pro mezzosoprán a klavír - Wie damals, 8 Lieder für Mezzosopran und Klavier
- 0085 Bezový keř, 11písní pro baryton a klavír – Holunderstrauch, 11 Lieder für Bariton und Klavier
- 0086 Suite to the Memory of Jaroslav Ježek per due violoncelli e pianoforte
- 0087 2 Pange lingua per coro misto
- 0088 III. Quartetto d´archi (Partitura e parti)
- 0089 IV. Quartetto d´archi (Partitura e parti)
- 0090 Sonata per viola e pianoforte
- 0091 Trio per flauto, violoncello e pianoforte
- 0092 Samota (Solitudine – Einsamkeit – Solitude)
- a) per violino e orchestra d´archi
- b) per violino e pianoforte
- c) per violoncello e pianoforte
- 0093 Suite to the Memory of Jaroslav Ježek
- a) per flauto, violino, violoncello e pianoforte
- b) per orchestra d´archi (Partitura e parti)
- c) per pianoforte
- 0094 Lento affabile per grande orchestra d´archi(Partitura e parti)
- 0095 Consonanza con Mozart per violino ossia flauto e pianoforte
- 0096 Svou káru táhnu za sebou – tři šansony pro střední hlas a klavír na básně Jiřího Sternwalda
- 0097 Sonatine per pianoforte
- 0098 Suite in modo classico per arpa ossia clavicemballo
- 0099 Quartetto per 4 flauti
- 0100 Sinfonietta per archi (Partitura e parti)
- 0101 Dvě velikonoční písně pro střední hlas a klavír
- 0102 Amoroso
- a) per pianoforte
- b) per violino ossia violoncello e pianoforte
- c) per violino, violoncello ossia fagotto e pianoforte
- 0103 Missa Neratovensis per coro misto, soli e organo (Partitura e parti)
- 0104 Vidi aquam per coro misto e organo
- 0105 Tři ženské sbory
- 0106 Toccata per pianoforte
