= Ivan Ženatý =

Czech violinist

Ivan Ženatý (born 2 February 1962) is a Czech violinist.

Ženatý appears regularly as a guest artist with BBC Symphony Orchestra of London, Symphonieorchester des Bayerischen Rundfunks, Berliner Symphoniker, Orchestra Nacional de Madrid as well as with orchestras in his homeland, in prior with the Czech Philharmonic, the Prague Symphony Orchestra and the Prague Radio Symphony Orchestra. What mostly attracts attention are his solo and chamber music projects (the complete Bach Sonatas and Partitas for solo violin or Beethoven and Brahms Sonatas from recent seasons). He is also appreciated for his taste and style and for his captivatingly beautiful tone.

== Life ==
Ženatý was born on 2 February 1962 in Lomnice nad Popelkou. The violinist began his professional career with his participation in the finale of the International Tchaikovsky Competition in Moscow, followed by his debut with the Czech Philharmonic and Libor Pešek and his first prize at the Prague Spring Competition. He earned the title of laureate at the UNESCO International Rostrum of Young Performers (1989). in 1990 Mr. Ženatý made his debut in London, in 1991 at the Berliner Philharmonie and the Concertgebouw in Amsterdam, in 1994 in Tokyo and in 1996 in New York and Buenos Aires. He has collaborated with Yehudi Menuhin, Yo-Yo Ma, Serge Baudo, Valery Gergiev, Andrey Boreyko, Neville Marriner and many others.

The musicianship of Ženatý has been influenced the most by his personal encounters with Nathan Milstein, Ruggiero Ricci and André Gertler, and a major change to his musical thinking was initiated by professor Bezrodny at the Tchaikovsky Conservatory in Moscow. What he valuate at most, however, have been his private lessons with Josef Suk and many subsequent years of their collaboration, climaxing with performances at the Mozart Festival Würzburg and the Prague Spring Festival and with a recording of the complete works of W. A. Mozart.

He has recorded the complete violin works of composers Telemann, Bach, Mendelssohn, Schumann, Schulhoff, Dvořák and Grieg. His new complete Dvořák recording has attracted attention, as well as has his recording of both violin concertos by J. B. Foerster with the BBC Symphony Orchestra and its music director Jiří Bělohlávek.

Ženatý played on Giuseppe Guarneri's violin Prince of Orange. Now he plays on another Guarneri violin made in 1740.

Ženatý has taught at Cleveland Institute of Music, Royal Danish Academy of Music and Hochschule für Musik Carl Maria von Weber in Dresden.

== Awards ==
- 1982 - Finalist of the International Tchaikovsky Competition in Moscow
- 1987 - Winner of the International Prague Spring Violin Competition
- 1989 - Laureate of the International Tribune of Young Performers UNESCO
- 1990 - Main prize of the Ruggiero Ricci international master-classes in Berlin
