= Prague Spring International Music Festival =

Annual classical music festival in Czechia

Coordinates: 50.090°N 14.416°E

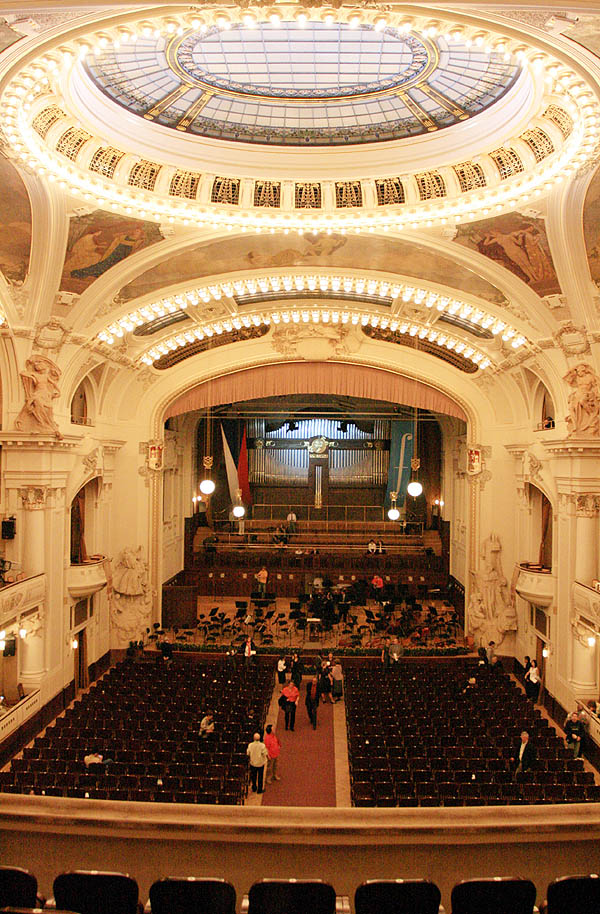
Municipal House in Prague, Czech Republic, serves as one of the main venues in the annual Prague Spring Festival.

The Prague Spring International Music Festival (Czech: Mezinárodní hudební festival Pražské jaro, commonly Czech: Pražské jaro, Prague Spring) is a classical music festival held every year in Prague, Czech Republic, with symphony orchestras and chamber music ensembles from around the world.

The first festival was held in 1946 under the patronage of Czechoslovak president Edvard Beneš, and its organizing committee was made up of important figures in Czech musical life. In that year, the Czech Philharmonic Orchestra was celebrating its fiftieth anniversary and was therefore granted to appear in all of the orchestral concerts. The project was initiated by Rafael Kubelík, chief conductor of the orchestra at the time. Such musicians as Karel Ančerl, Leonard Bernstein, Sir Adrian Boult, Rudolf Firkušný, Jaroslav Krombholc, Rafael Kubelík, Moura Lympany, Yevgeny Mravinsky, Charles Münch, Ginette Neveu, Jarmila Novotná, Lev Oborin, David Oistrakh, Ken-Ichiro Kobayashi and Jan Panenka have appeared at the festival. Since 1952, the festival has opened on 12 May, the anniversary of the death of Bedřich Smetana, with his cycle of symphonic poems Má vlast (My Country), and it used to close (until 2003) with Ludwig van Beethoven's Symphony No. 9.

The festival commemorates important musical anniversaries by including works by the composers concerned on its programmes, and presents Czech as well as world premieres of compositions by contemporary authors. Artists and orchestras who performed at the festival include Sviatoslav Richter, Lorin Maazel, Herbert von Karajan, Mstislav Rostropovich, Julian Lloyd Webber, Boris Pergamenschikow, Lucia Popp, Kim Borg, Sir Colin Davis, Maurice André, Dmitry Sitkovetsky, Leonid Kogan, Paul Klecki, Gustav Leonhardt, Anne-Sophie Mutter, Giovanni Bellucci, Alfred Brendel, Heinrich Schiff, Leopold Stokowski, Arthur Honegger, Arthur Rubinstein, and Gennady Rozhdestvensky.

Prague Spring's traditional venue is the Rudolfinum concert hall, a neo-renaissance building situated on the bank of the Vltava River. It is complemented by Prague's ornate Municipal House (Obecní dům), which has a larger seating capacity.

The Prague Spring has a particular focus on supporting younger performers. The Prague Spring International Music Competition was established just one year after the festival itself and is held each year in various instrumental sections. The list of past winners of competition includes Mstislav Rostropovich, Saša Večtomov, Natalia Gutman, James Galway and Maurice Bourgue.

== Competitions, disciplines, and laureates ==
- Piano: Giovanni Bellucci, Martin Kasík, Ivo Kahánek
- Organ: Václav Rabas, Aleš Bárta, Martin Sander, Jaroslav Tůma
- Violin: Ivan Štraus, Bohuslav Matoušek, Ivan Ženatý, Petr Messiereur, Jindřich Pazdera,
- Cello: Mstislav Rostropovich
- Trumpet: Vladislav Kozderka, Vladimír Rejlek
- Trombone: Nicolas Moutier, Carl Lenthe, Gonçalo Nova
- Flute: Jean Ferrandis, Andrea Lieberknecht, Tatjana Ruhland, Dora Seres, Denis Bouriakov, Yubeen Kim, Chaeyeon You
- French Horn: Radek Baborák
- Basson: Luboš Hucek, Václav Vonášek
- Oboe: Liběna Séquardtová
- Singing: Dagmar Pecková, Štefan Margita, Magda Ianculescu
- Harpsichord: Jean Rondeau, Anastasia Antonova
- Conducting: Charles Olivieri-Munroe, Pierre-Michel Durand

== See also ==
- Designblok

== Bibliography ==
- Antonín Matzner a kol.: Šedesát pražských jar. Togga: Praha, 2006.
