= Sádlo =

Sádlo (feminine: Sádlová) is a Czech surname, meaning 'lard'. Notable people with the surname include:

- Christiane Sadlo (born 1954), German screenwriter and journalist
- Karel Pravoslav Sádlo (1898–1971), Czech cellist
- Mike Sadlo (born 1971), German footballer
- Miloš Sádlo (1912–2003), Czech cellist
- Miloslav Sádlo (1897–1961), Czech violist and soloist
