= František Xaver Thuri =

Czech composer (1939–2019)

František Xaver Thuri (also known as F. X. Thuri) (29 April 1939 Prague - 22 April 2019) was a Czech composer, harpsichordist, oboist, organist, musicologist and a notable pedagogue.

== Early life and education ==
After graduating from the Prague Conservatory majoring in organ studies, he went on to study oboe at the Janáček Academy of Music and Performing Arts. He had worked as an oboist for the Prague Radio Symphony Orchestra and Prague Chamber Orchestra.

== Contributions to the music world ==
He is known for his tenure as a professor of the Prague Conservatory where he had taught a number of notable Czech oboe players (for example his son Jan Thuri, soloist Vilém Veverka among others), who constitute the majority of current soloists in Czech orchestras and solo oboe performers.

In the Czech Republic he is often called 'the last baroque composer', having written an extensive number of works in baroque and early classicism style.

== Notable works ==
=== Church music ===
- Musica Sacromontana jubilatica;
- Mass in F major;
- Mass in B;
- Requiem in c minor;
- Stabat Mater

=== Instrumental music ===
- 4 concertos for Oboe and Orchestra (recorded on Thuri records by his son Jan Thuri);
- 2 concertos for Organ and Orchestra;
- Homage to Jan Dismas Zelenka
- Poema "Elbrus" for Oboe, B-flat Clarinet & Bassoon;
- Czech Folksong Suite for Oboe, B-flat Clarinet and Bassoon
