= Patricia Janečková =

Slovak singer (1998–2023)

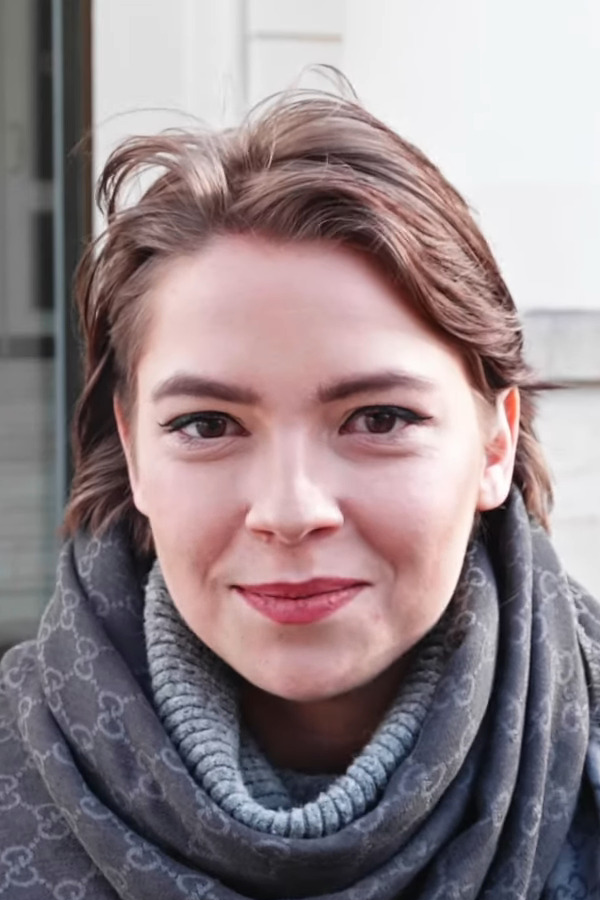
- Janečková in 2022
- Born: 18 June 1998; Münchberg, Bavaria, Germany
- Died: 1 October 2023 (aged 25); Ostrava, Czech Republic
- Spouse: Vlastimil Burda (m. 2023)
- Parents: Martin Janeček (father); Zuzana Janečková (mother)
- Musical career
- Genres: Opera; classical
- Occupation: Singer
- Years active: 2010–2023

YouTube information
- Channel: Patricia Janečková
- Views: 50 million
- Last updated: 5 October 2023

Patricia Burda Janečková (18 June 1998 – 1 October 2023) was a Slovak coloratura soprano. At the age of 12, she was the winner of the Czech–Slovak television show Talentmania in November 2010 and gained international recognition through the broadcasting of CNN television shortly after winning.

== Early life ==
Janečková was born in Münchberg to Slovak parents Martin Janeček, double bassist and Zuzana Janečková who used to play the violin. Shortly after, her family moved to Ostrava in the Czech Republic. She started singing at the age of four. After graduating from primary school, she began studying voice at the Janáček Conservatory in Ostrava.

== Professional career ==
Rossini: Petite messe solennelle, Crucifixus

Janečková first performed publicly at the Antonín Dvořák Theatre, accompanied by the Janáček Philharmonic Orchestra. Subsequent to this, she went on to win the Talentmania competition in 2010, at age 12, having received over 1 million votes.

In 2014, she won the international singing competition at the Concorso Internazionale di Musica Sacra in Rome.

Janečková was noted for her passionate and emotive performances, and is known for receiving a standing ovation while performing Ennio Morricone's theme song from Once Upon a Time in the West at the Rudolfinum in Prague. She continued to perform in public while studying privately with Czech soprano Eva Dřízgová-Jirušová.

In 2017, she performed the role of Galatea in Handel's Acis and Galatea with Collegium Marianum as part of the Janáček Music Festival.

Janečková released her self-titled début album in 2011, at age 13. She went on to collaborate with Czech oboist Vilém Veverka on a Christmas album in 2022.

== Personal life ==
Janečková married actor Vlastimil Burda in June 2023.

=== Cancer diagnosis and death ===
On 10 February 2022, Janečková announced on her Instagram page that she had been diagnosed with breast cancer and would take a career hiatus for an undetermined length of time. A fundraising concert was hosted in January 2023 by Radio Čas to support her treatment, featuring the well-known artists Čechomor, Martina and Lukáš Vlček, Hana Fialová and Tomáš Krpec. Janečková returned to the stage on 15 December 2022, performing the role of Esmeralda in Smetana's comic opera The Bartered Bride. Despite early signs of a successful treatment, Janečková died from the illness on 1 October 2023. She was 25. Her funeral mass was held at the Roman Catholic Church of the Holy Spirit in Zábřeh borough of Ostrava - Jih. She is buried in Ondrejský Cemetery in Bratislava.

== Discography ==
- Patricia Janečková (Bellevoice Produktion, 2011)
- Christmas Album – with Vilém Veverka (Supraphon, 2022)
