= Jan Thuri =

Czech oboist (born 1975)

Jan Thuri (born 1975) is a Czech oboist born in Prague in a musical family. He is a son of a notable Czech composer, organist and a pedagogue František Xaver Thuri. Jan Thuri is a Marigaux brand ambassador.

== Early life ==
After starting his musical education with piano and violin, Jan Thuri started playing the oboe at the age of thirteen. After graduating from the Prague Conservatory in class of František Xaver Thuri, he went on to study at the Utrechts Conservatorium with Ernest Rombout and at the Faculty of Musical Arts in Ostrava with Dusan Foltyn. He has further taken lessons and took part in master-classes with Jean-Louis Capezzali, Maurice Bourgue, Han de Vries, Jérôme Guichard, and Jacques Tys.

== Professional career ==
Jan Thuri is a soloist, having performed all across Europe, USA, South Korea and Japan, where he performs and teaches on a regular basis. Besides his solo career, he often performs with chamber ensembles he co-founded (Thuri Ensemble, wind trio DuBois). He is an active recording artist, notable for having recorded a set of his father's Oboe Concertos for Thuri records. He also recorded for EMI and Virgo Record Label. He is a professor of oboe and chamber music at the Prague Conservatory.

== Awards ==
Jan Thuri has won numerous prestigious oboe competitions, among them:

- Second place at the Isle of Wight International Oboe Competition (Barbirolli International Oboe Festival and Competition);
- First place at the European Music Competition in Picardy;
- First place at the EBU-UER TIJI UNESCO.
