= Vlasta Prachatická =

Czech portrait sculptor (1929–2022)

Acad. sculptor Vlasta Prachatická
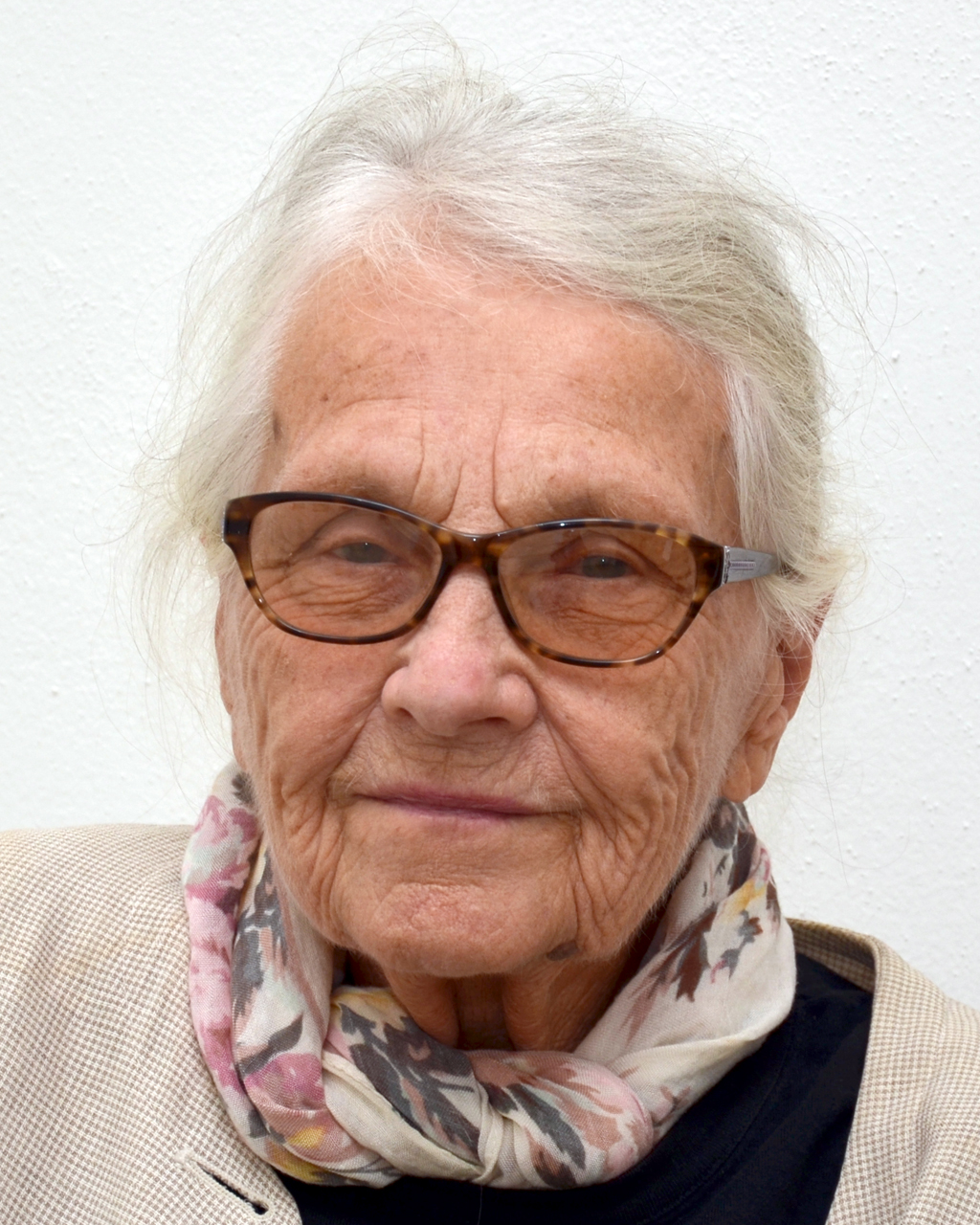
- Vlasta Prachatická (2018)
- Born: 27 November 1929; Staré Smrkovice, Czechoslovakia
- Died: 27 April 2022 (aged 92); Prague, Czech Republic
- Education: Academy of Fine Arts, Prague
- Known for: sculptor
- Spouse: Stanislav Kolíbal
- Children: Markéta Prachatická, Pavel Kolíbal

Vlasta Prachatická (27 November 1929 – 27 April 2022) was a Czech portrait sculptor, honorary member of the British Society of Portrait Sculptors.

== Life ==
After the war, she spent a year at the Higher Industrial School of Sculpture and Stonemasonry in Hořice, where her teacher was Myslbek's pupil Prof. Jaroslav Plichta. In 1946–1951 she studied at the Academy of Fine Arts in Prague in the studio of Professor Otakar Španiel. Her graduation Portrait of mother, exhibited in 1951, was purchased by the National Gallery. In 1952 she acquired an apartment in Prague 7, Nad Královskou oborou 23, which she partly used as a studio.

In 1953 she married the sculptor Stanislav Kolíbal. Their daughter Markéta Prachatická (born 1953), is an artist, their son Pavel Kolíbal (born 1956), is an architect.

In 1952, she took part in a joint exhibition at the Academy in Berlin and in 1957 in a joint exhibition of five artists in the Aleš Hall of the Umělecká beseda, prepared by the art historian František Matouš. In the 1960s she became a member of the UB 12 group and exhibited at all its exhibitions until 1965. The members of UB 12 mostly studied at the Academy of Arts, Architecture and Design in Prague, where prevailed a freer creative spirit than at the Academy and their interest in modern art also influenced Vlasta Prachatická.

In 1967 she was invited to join an exhibition of five sculptors at the Václav Špála Gallery (Pacík, Zoubek, Kmentová, Vinopalová, Prachatická) and represented Czechoslovakia at the Sculpture Biennale in Middelheim, Belgium. She won the competition for a portrait of Jan Masaryk for the entrance hall of the Ministry of Foreign Affairs, but after the Warsaw Pact invasion of Czechoslovakia the bust was never installed.

In 1968 she accompanied Stanislav Kolíbal on his study stay in Vence. Thanks to Kolíbal's scholarship from the Deutscher Akademischer Austauschdienst (DAAD), she spent the years 1988 and 1989 in Berlin. Thanks to the support of the Calder Foundation, she spent half a year in Saché, France in 1992. Since 2006 she has been an honorary member of the British Society of Portrait Sculptors.

Vlasta Prachatická lived and worked in Prague.

== Work ==
Since her student days she has been working on sculptural portraits. Initially, she portrayed well-known people from her surroundings - her mother, her father, her friend, Daisy Mrázek. She started from the classical principles concerning surface modelling as formulated by leading sculptors: Despiau - "even the smallest part of a sculpture's surface must have a life of its own", Rodin - "the sculptor, like the builder, kneads and models light and shadow", or Giacometti - "heads are matter in constant motion, a mutable form, never quite graspable".

She avoided psychologising and formal stylisation of portraits, but was aware of the significant relationship between the anatomical structure of the skull and the relief representation of the face, which is an expression of the tension of skin and muscles. She was inspired by the impressionist modelling of Medardo Rosso and the balance of Charles Despiau's works, which remain faithful to the subject without suppressing artistic imagery. The closest Czech sculptor to her was Josef Kaplický, whose portrait reflected the legacy of the avant-garde personified by Otto Gutfreund. The works of her mature period were inspired by the expressive modelling of Marino Marini and the abstracted conception of portraiture by Alberto Giacometti, based on sensory perceptions and emotional stirrings.

The modelling of the face in clay, in particular, lacks luminous qualities and thus affects the likeness of the sitter, while the bronze cast is "too definitive" and at the same time the deadliest. Prachatická therefore prefers the plaster cast, which for her is a real and living original. Moreover, the plaster can be modified or finished with polychromy.

Consistently working on portraits meant the need to get into the personal background and consider the nature and characteristics of the person being portrayed. This was easier in the case of people with whom she and Stanislav Kolíbal were friendly. This circle included the art historian František Matouš, who curated the exhibition of young artists at Umělecká beseda (1957), and his daughter Helena, or the painter Václav Bartovský, one of the founders of UB 12. Prachatická was always keenly interested in modern and classical music and her friends included some well-known musicians and composers (Pavel Bořkovec, Karel Balling). In an attempt to capture the likeness of a person as truthfully as possible, she returned to some of her portraits several years later. She first modelled a portrait of her uncle, the cellist Karel Pravoslav Sádlo, in 1961, but she later destroyed the study herself and did not reach a final portrait until 1985.

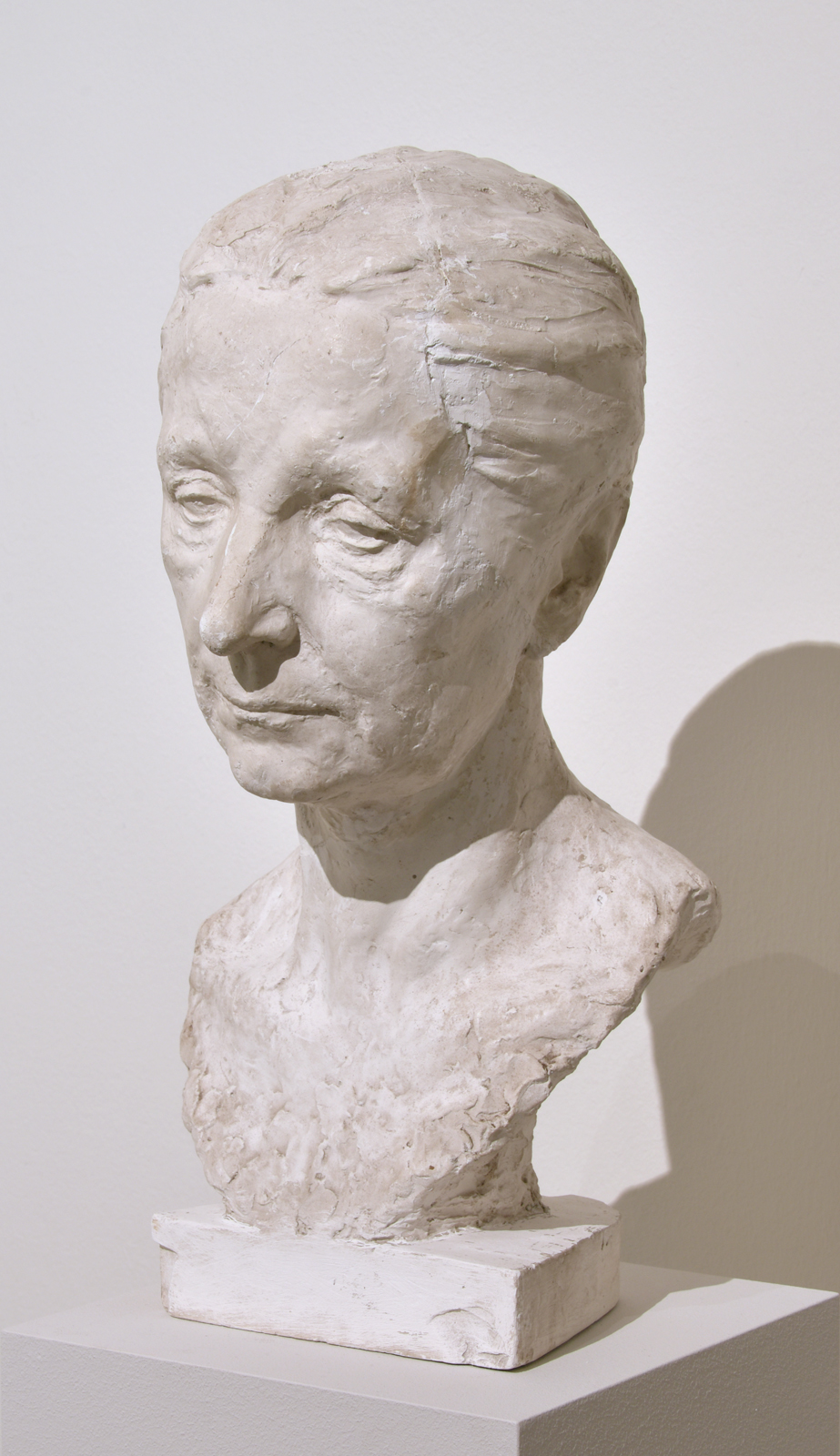
Mother I, 1951

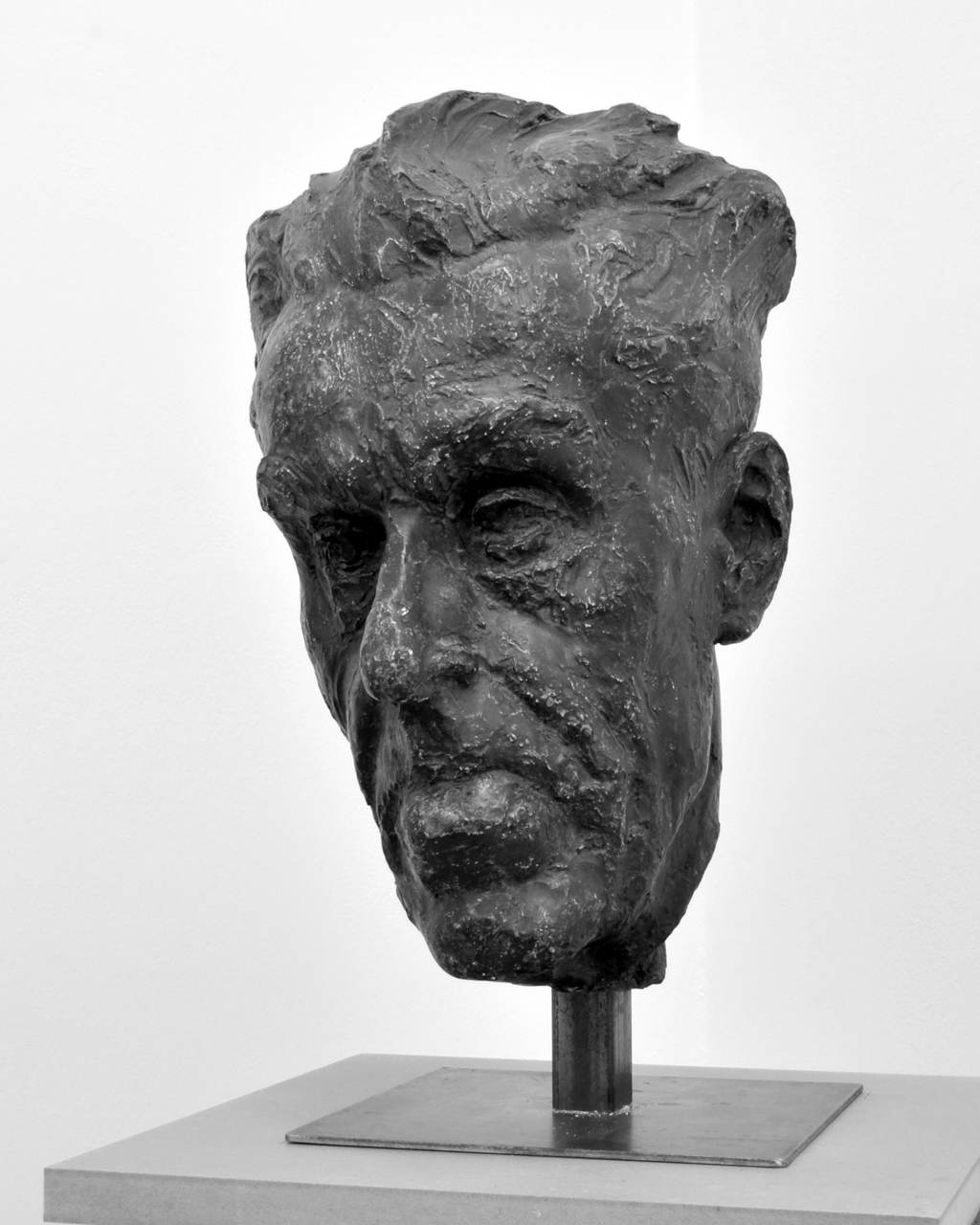
PhDr František Matouš, 1955

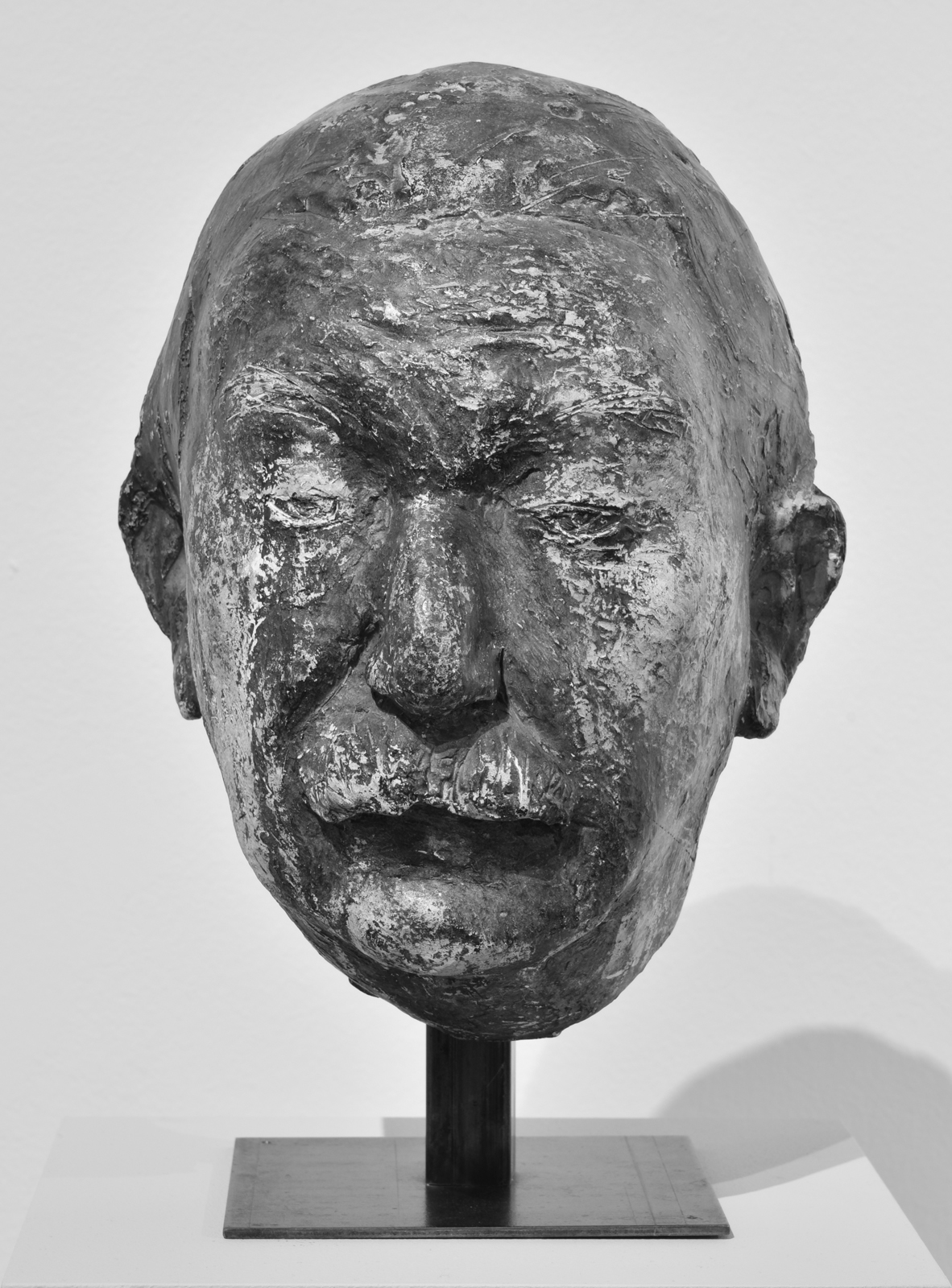
Václav Bartovský, 1959

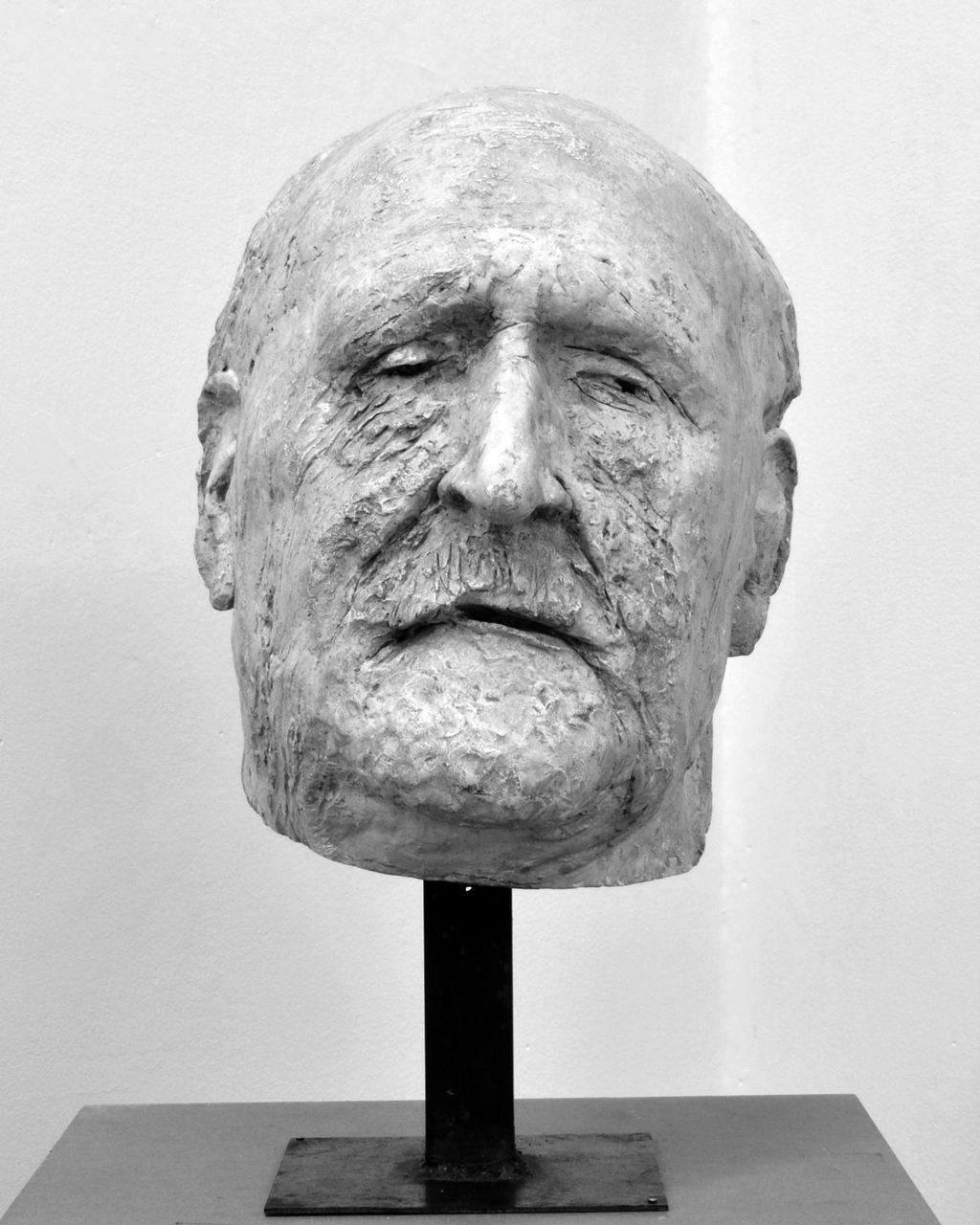
Karel Pravoslav Sádlo, 1960

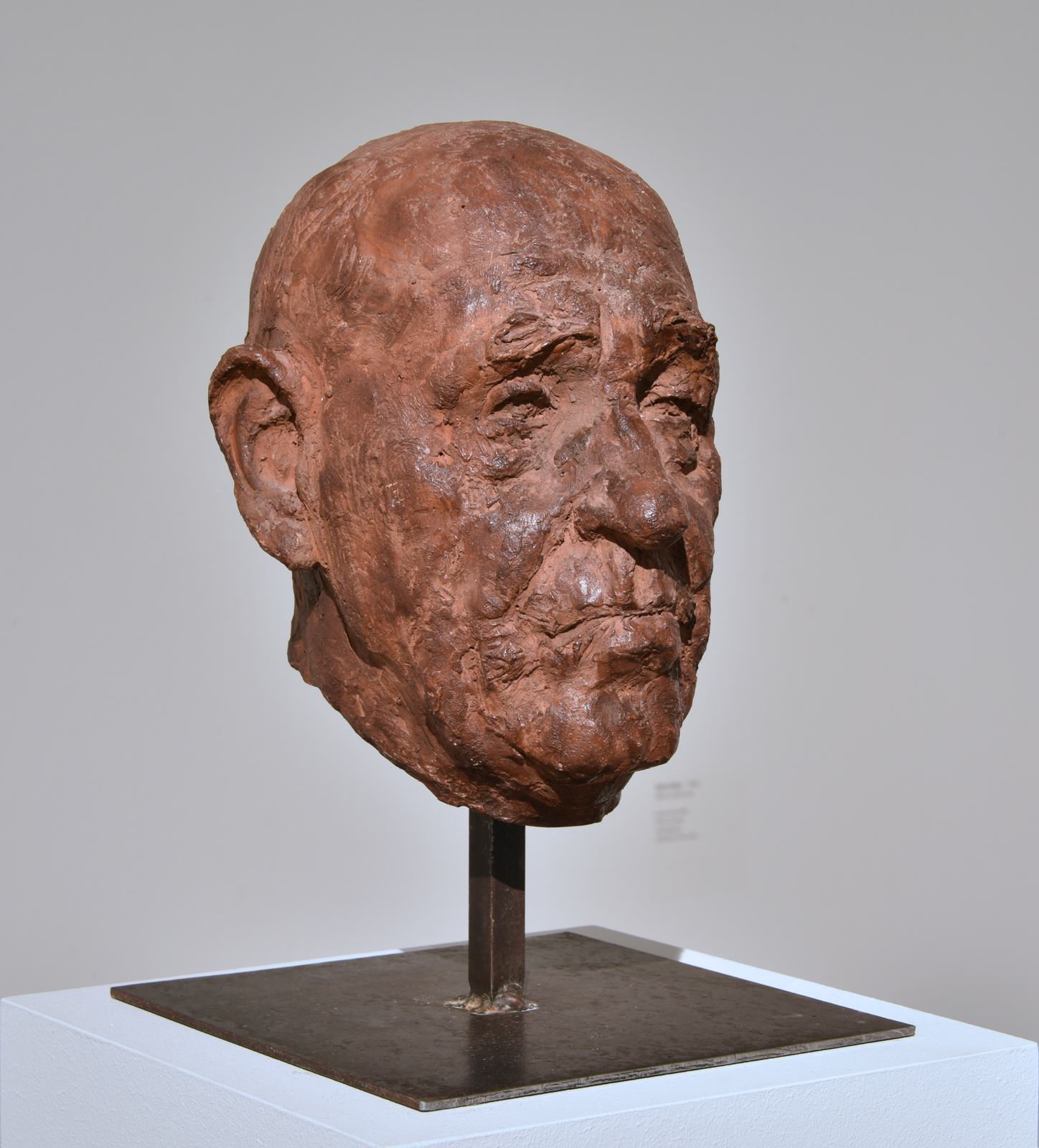
Portrait of father, 1962

Since the turn of the 1960s and 1970s, when she received some public commissions, it was necessary to model without direct contact with the sitter, only on the basis of documentation. Such assignments included the portrait of Ludwig van Beethoven (Hradec nad Moravicí Castle), Karel Hoffmann, Archbishop of Olomouc Antonín Cyril Stojan or Jan Masaryk. Even with the living people she portrayed, she eventually grew tired of the model's stiff expression when sitting in the studio. She preferred to observe people in everyday life and to capture in memory the fleeting facial expressions that give a portrait its natural character. It is the ability to abstract characteristic facial features that makes Vlasta Prachaticka's work unique. Her latest portraits depict mostly people who are no longer alive. For the sculptor, this did not mean a limitation, but rather greater creative freedom.

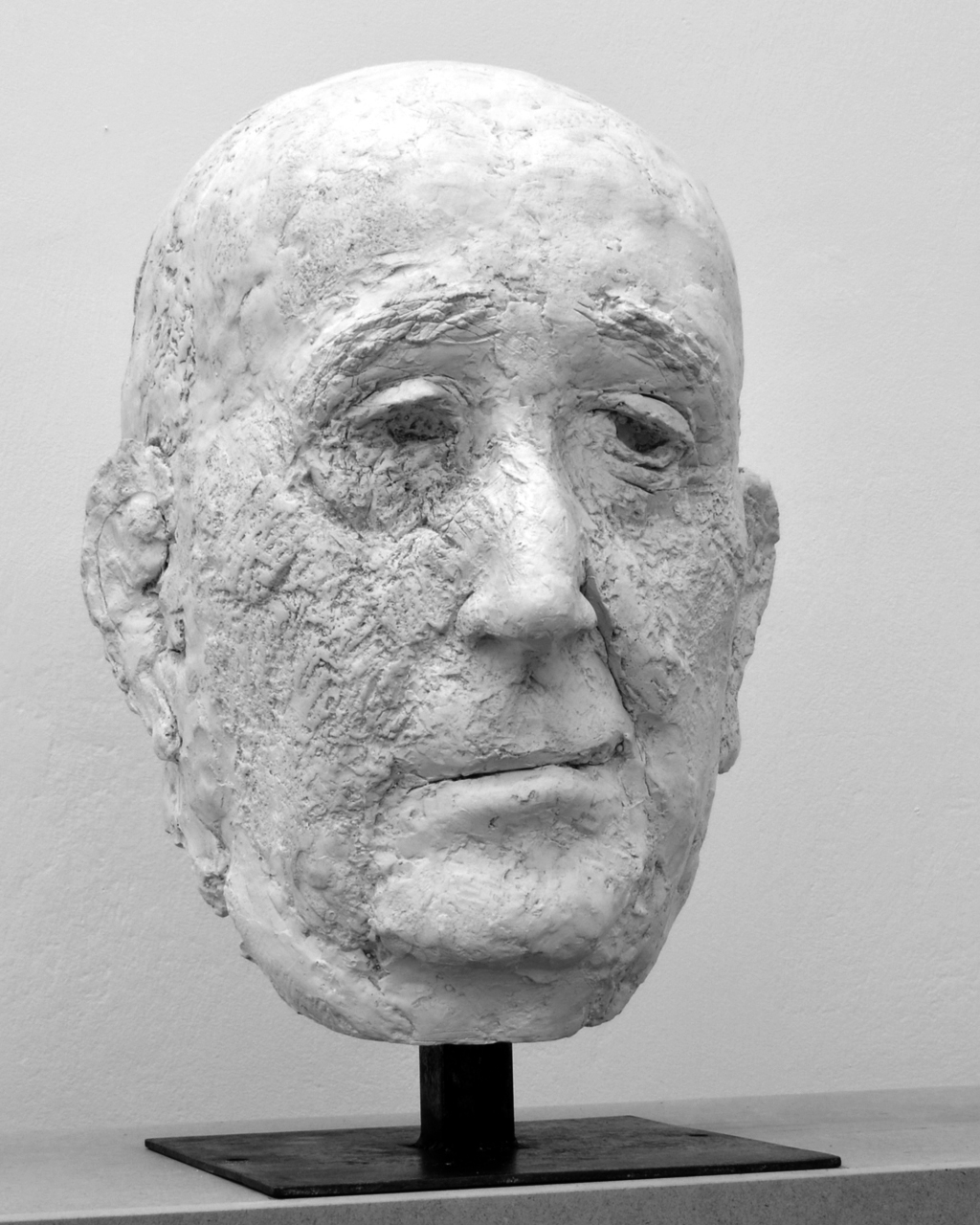
Jan Masaryk, 1968

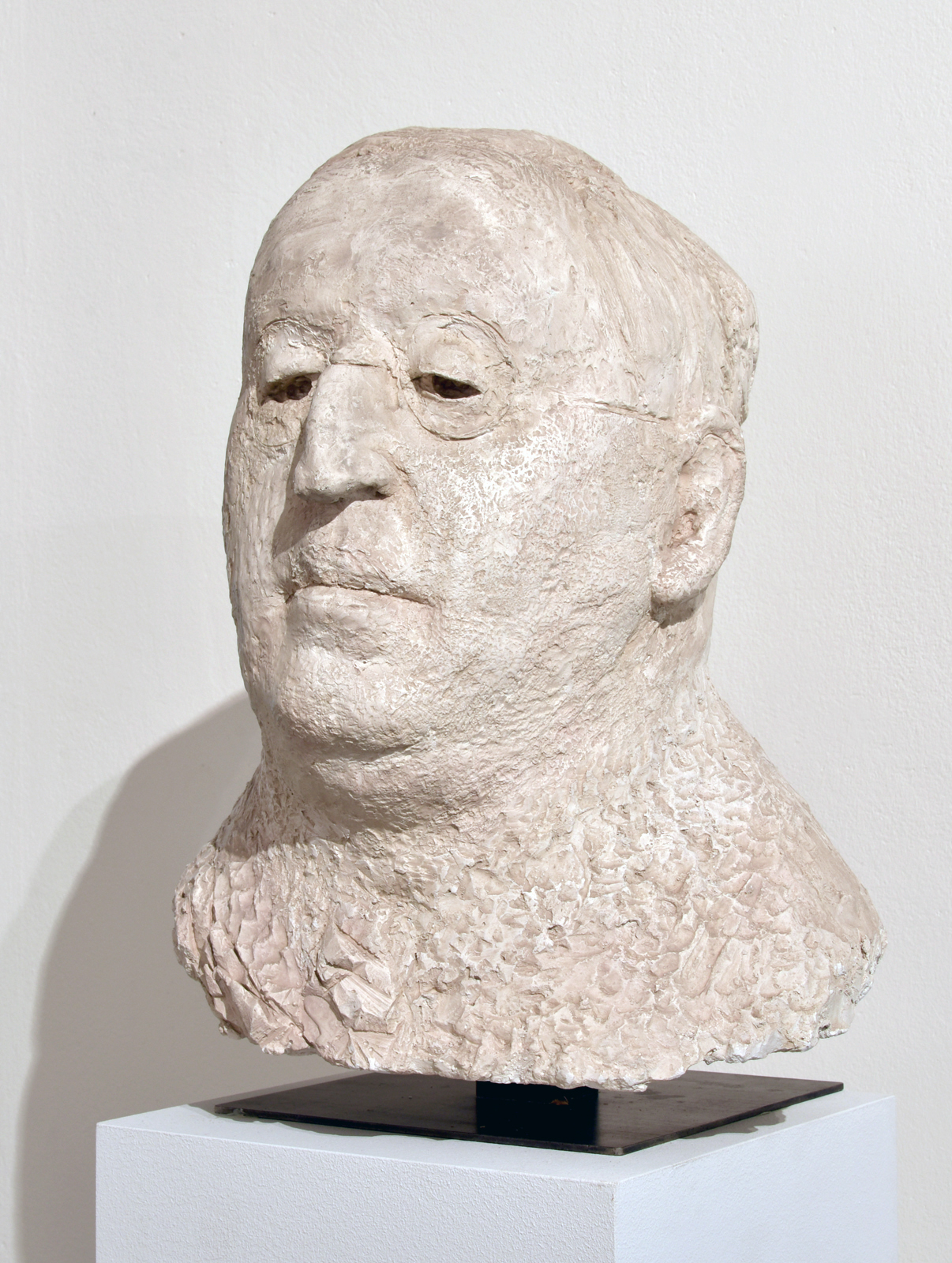
Josef Čapek, 1972

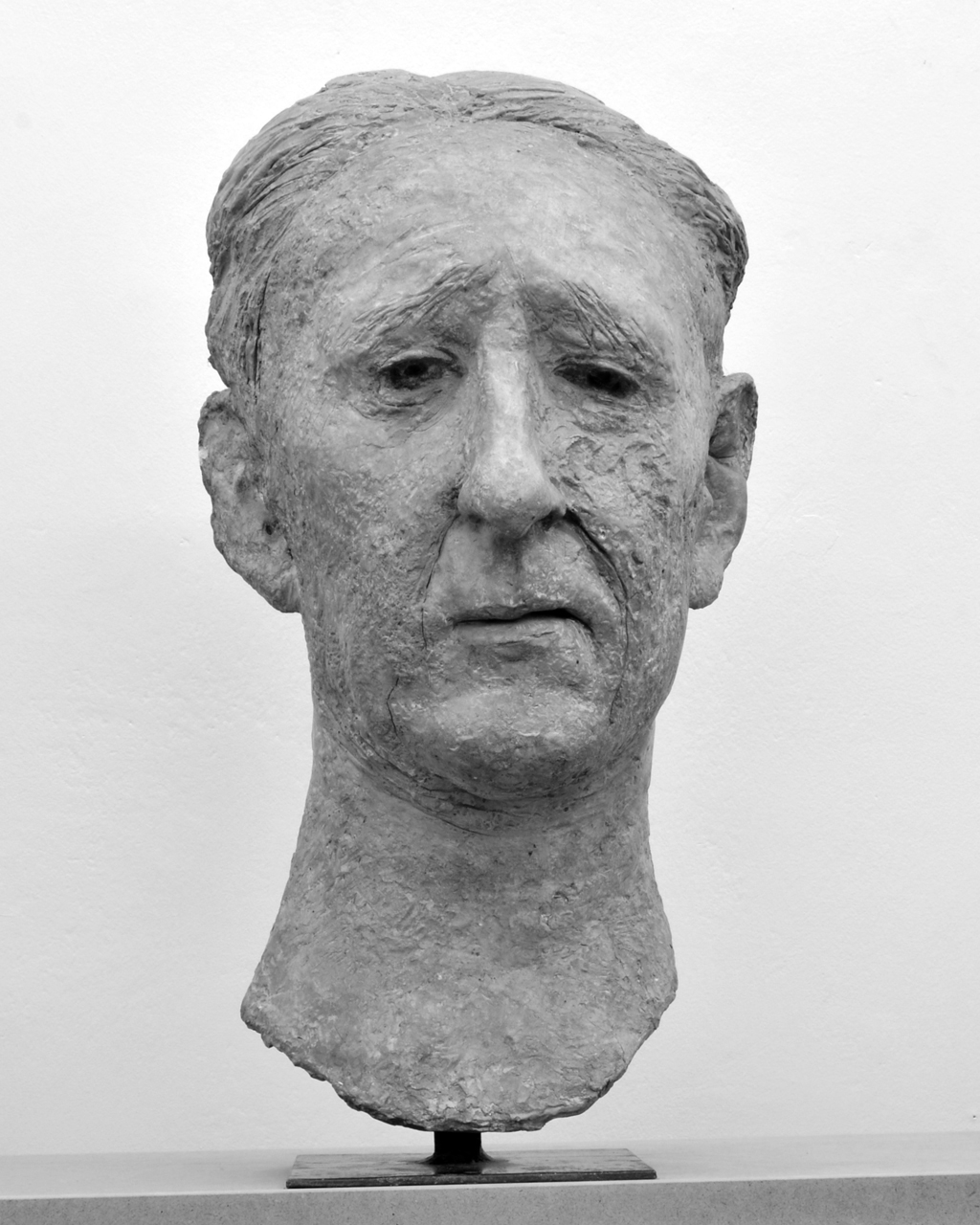
Bohuslav Martinů, 1978

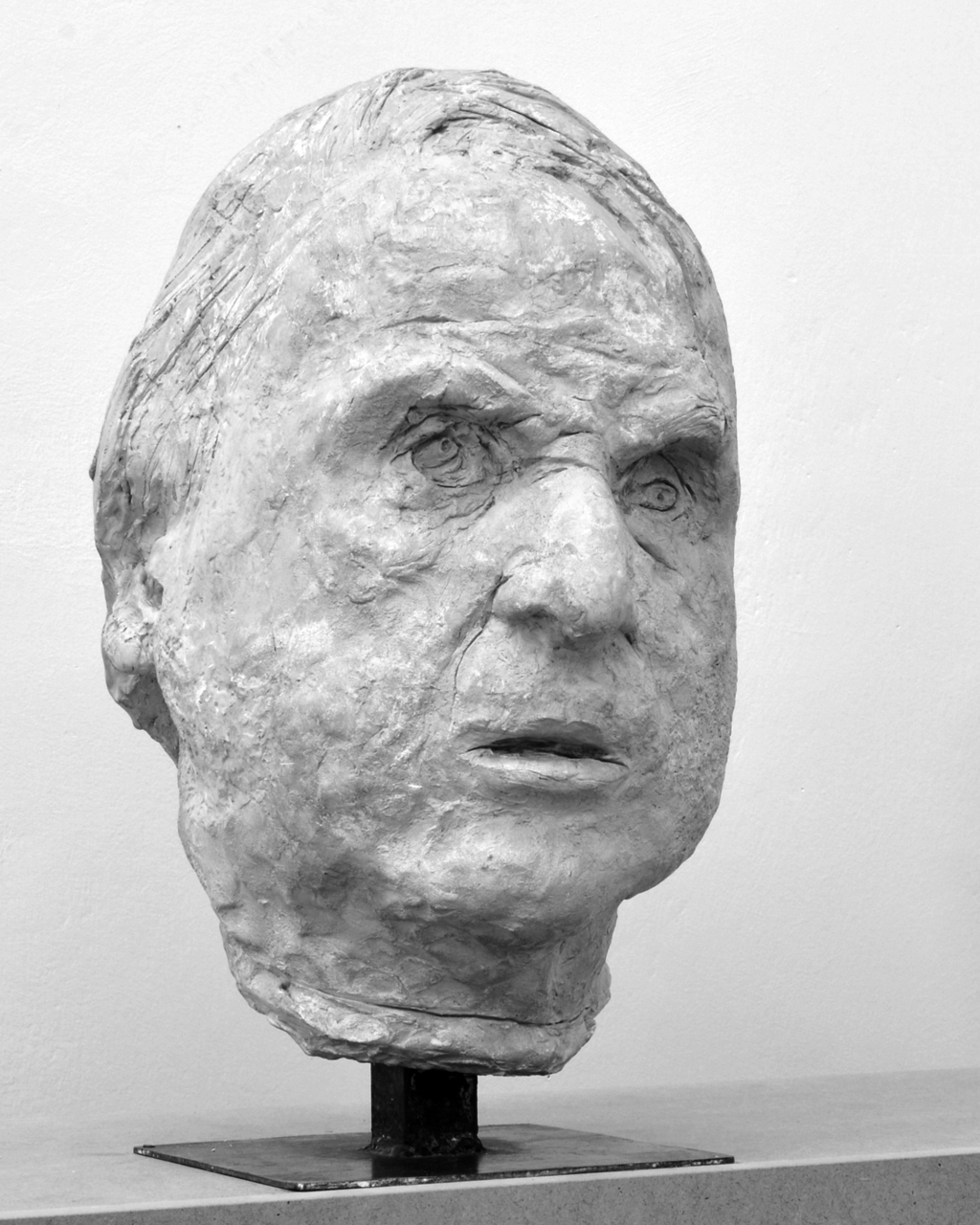
Francis Bacon, 1985

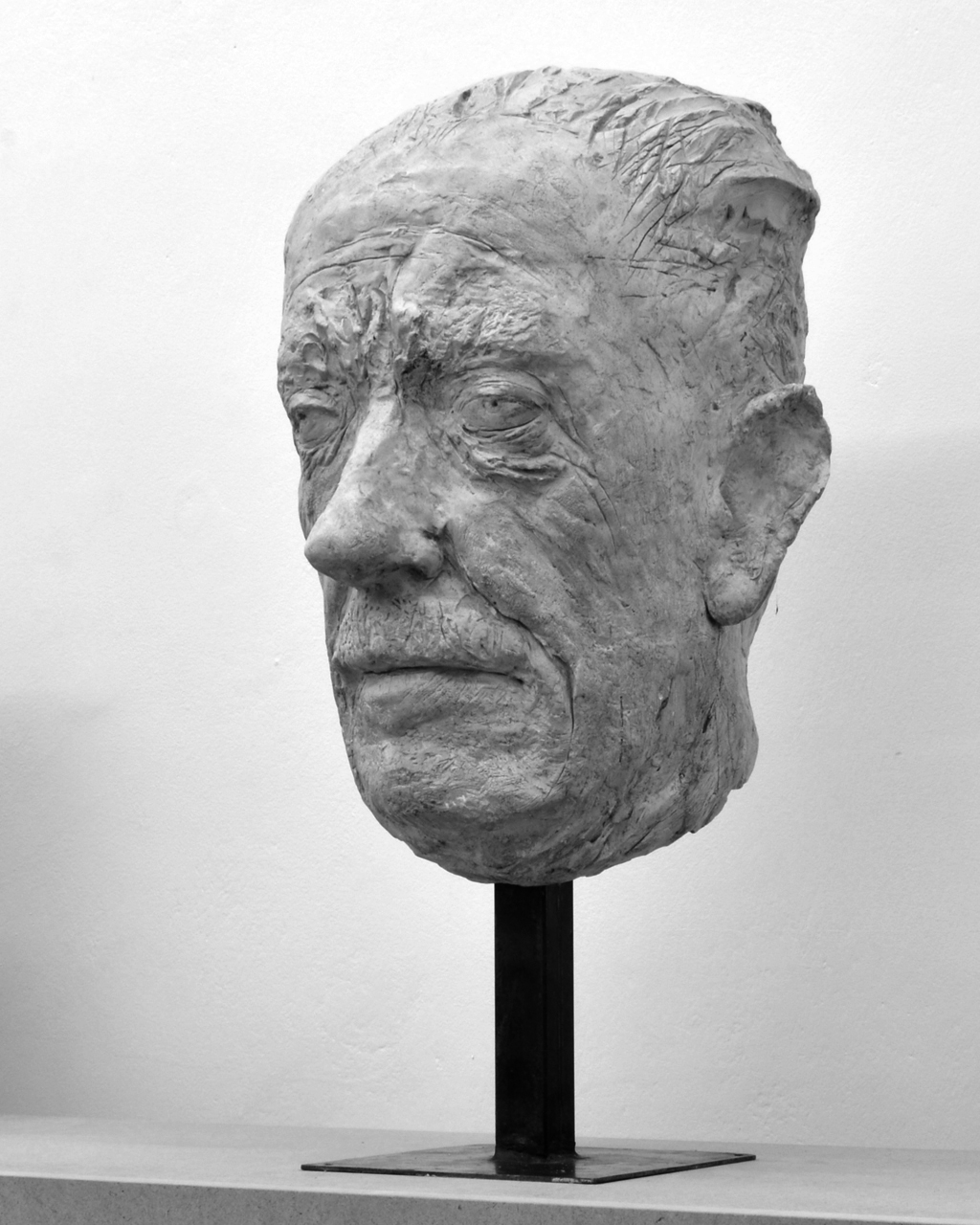
Josef Šíma, 1988

=== Quote ===
"I have always been interested only in the human face. However, I am not only concerned with expressing the one to whom it belongs. For a few thousand years, actually, people have been interested in it, and in that time, the external changes are not so obvious. We still find types of some ancient portraits around us. But my point is to express, by all artistic means, the head that belongs to our time."

=== Realisations ===
- 1969 Ludwig van Beethoven, Hradec nad Moravicí Castle
- 1970 commemorative plaque with bust of Josef Bohuslav Foerster, Wattmanngasse 25, Vienna
- 1972 Portrait of Archbishop Stojan, St. Moritz Church, Kroměříž
- 1972 commemorative plaque with a portrait of Karel Hoffmann, violinist of the Bohemian Quartet
- 1978 portrait of Bohuslav Martinů, foyer of the National Theatre, Prague
- 1980 Vincenc Kramář, head and memorial plaque, Municipal Library, Mariánské náměstí Prague
- 1985 Portrait and memorial plaque of painter Jaroslav Hněvkovský on his family home in Žebrák
- 1988 portrait of Josef Šíma, Jaroměř City Museum
- 1988 portrait of Josef Bohuslav Foerster, foyer of the National Theatre, Prague
- 1997 commemorative plaque with a portrait of Josef Václav Sládek, Resslova 5, Prague 2
- 1999 bust of Jan Palach, Všetaty Primary School
- 2006 Rainer Maria Rilke, bust and memorial plaque, Na Příkopě 16, Prague 1
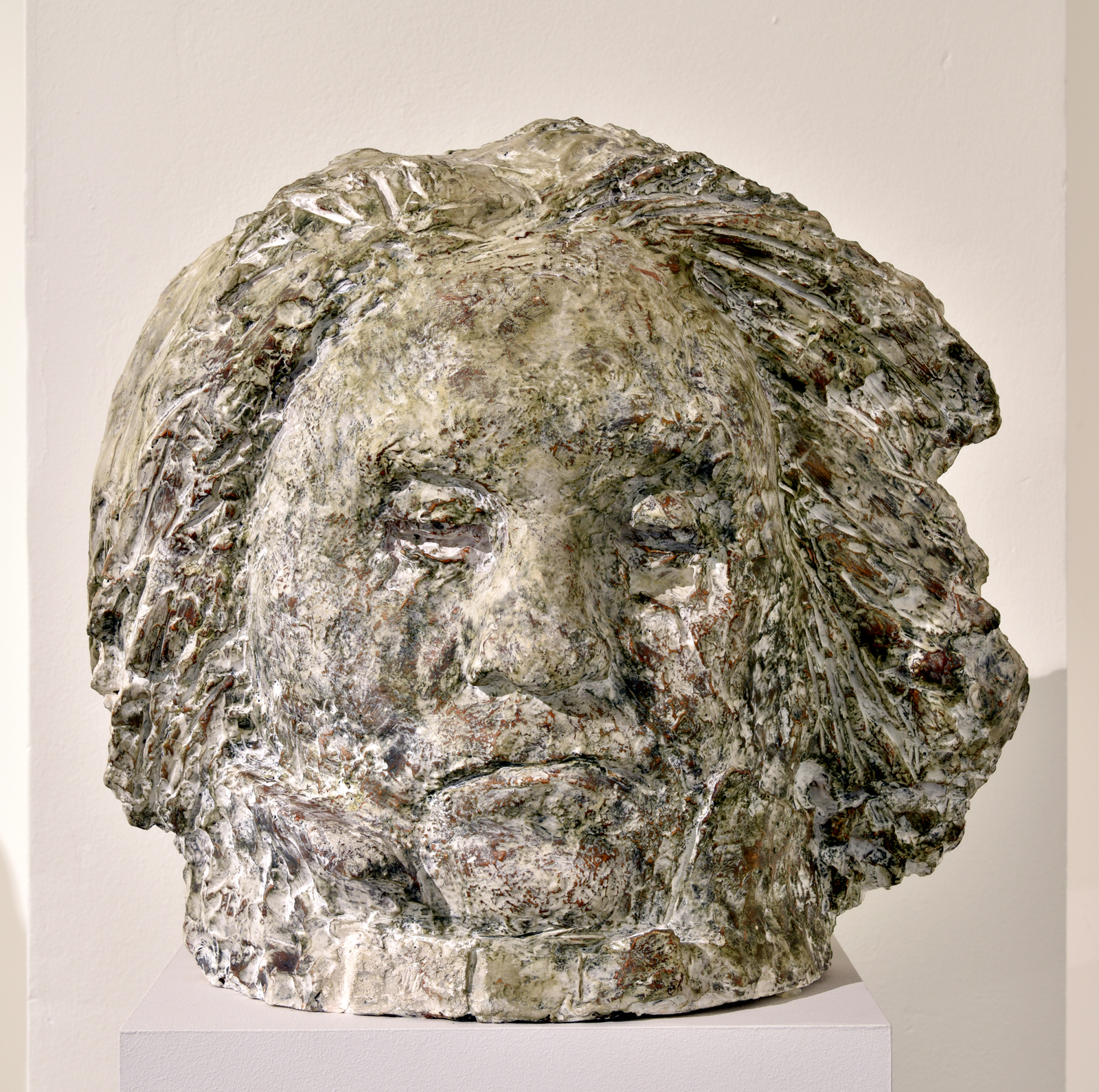
Vlasta Prachatická: Ludwig van Beethoven, 1969

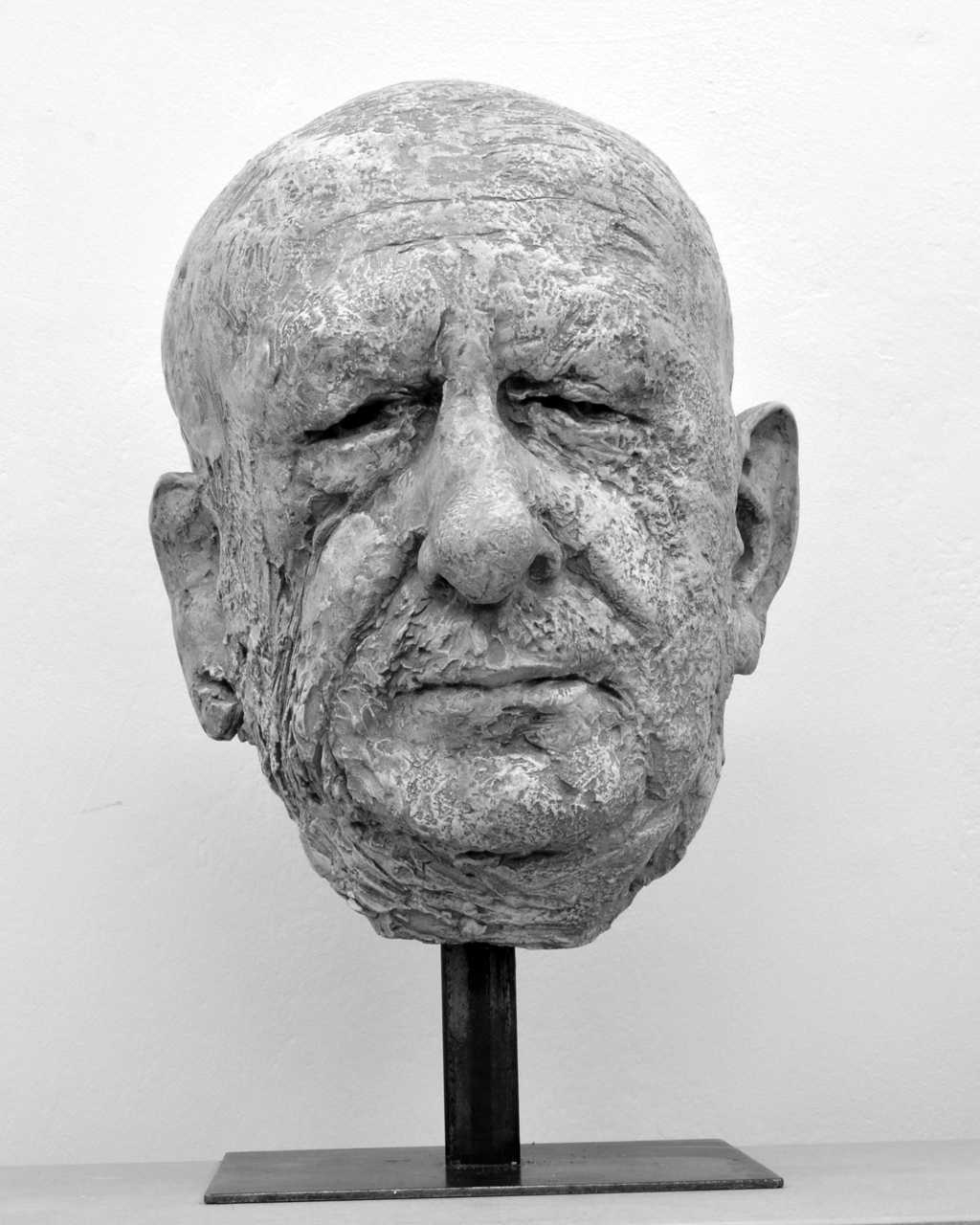
Vlasta Prachatická: Karel Hoffmann, 1972

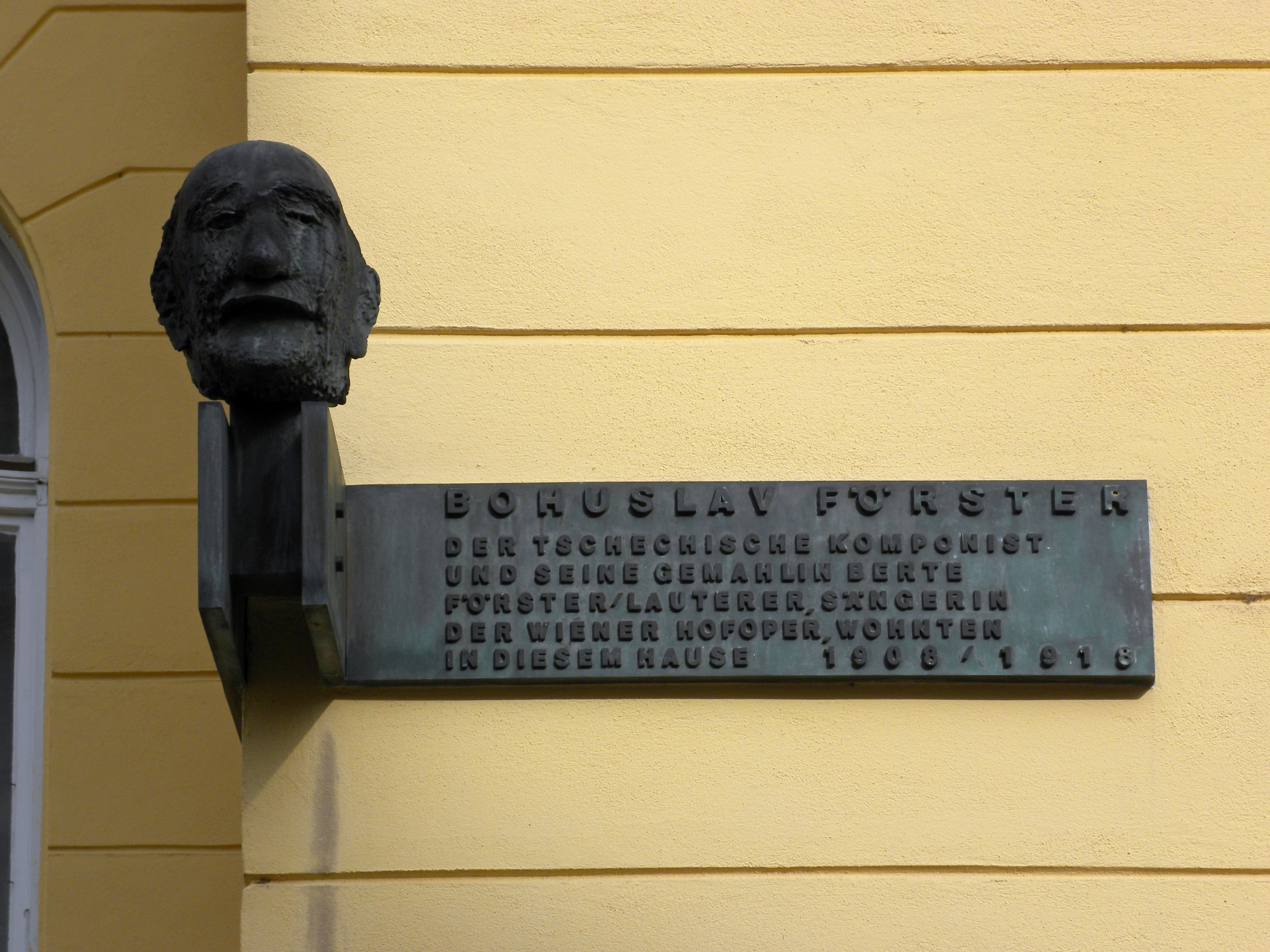
Josef Bohuslav Foerster Memorial Plaque, Vienna

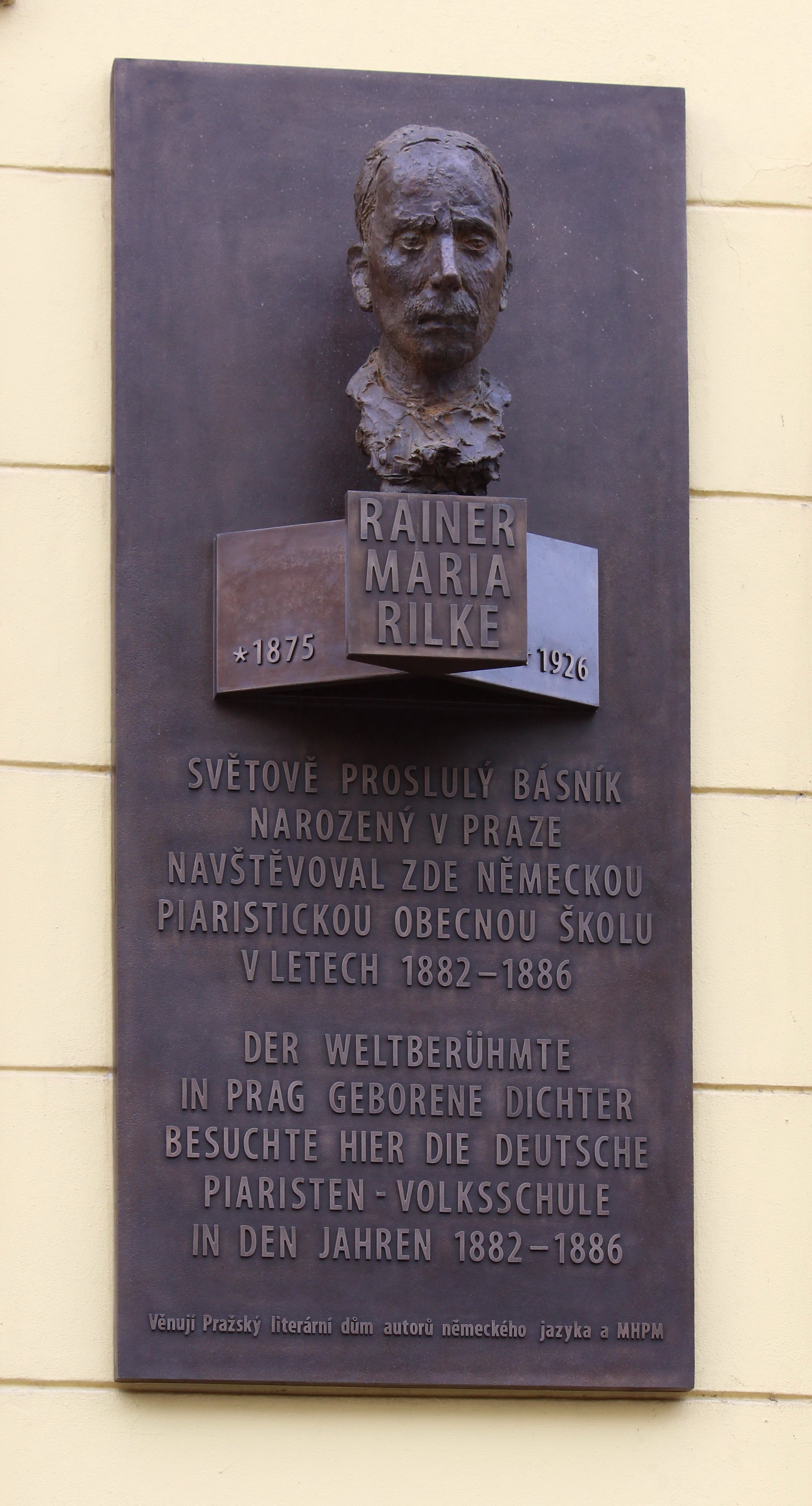
Vlasta Prachatická: memorial plaque of R. M. Rilke, Prague, Na příkopě, 2011

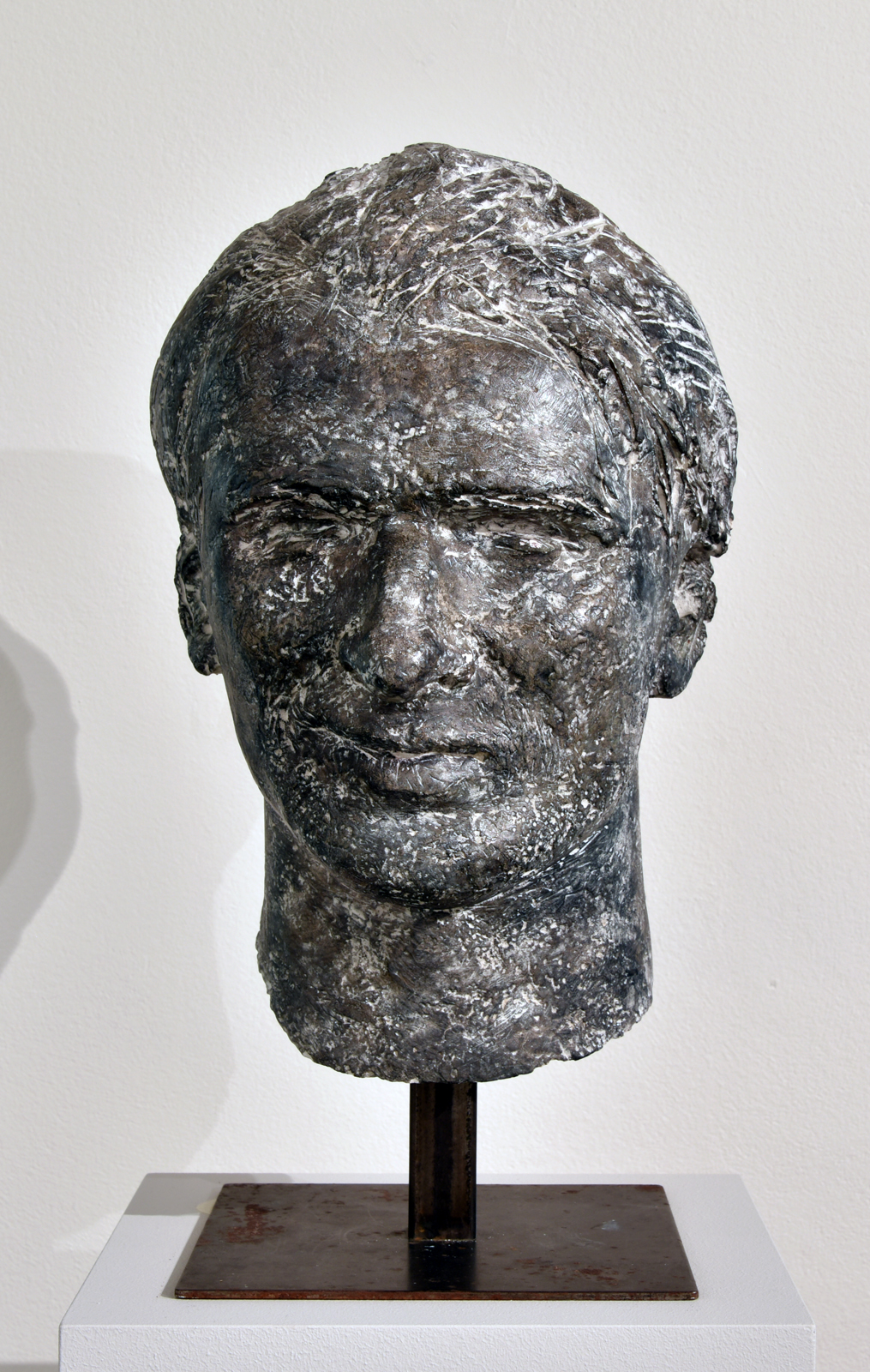
Vlasta Prachatická: Portrait of Jan Palach, 1998

=== Representation in collections ===
- National Gallery in Prague
- Gallery of the Central Bohemian Region in Kutná Hora (formerly ČMVU)
- Gallery of the City of Prague
- Gallery of Modern Art in Roudnice nad Labem
- Gallery of Fine Arts in Ostrava
- Art Gallery Karlovy Vary
- Moravian Gallery in Brno
- Museum of Art Olomouc
- Gallery Klatovy / Klenová

=== Individual exhibitions ===
- 1961 Daisy Mrázková, Vlasta Prachatická: Portraits, Gallery on Charles Square, Prague
- 1985 Vlasta Prachatická : Portraits, Old Town Hall, Prague City Gallery
- 2001 Vlasta Prachatická : Portraits, Veletržní palác, National Gallery in Prague
- 2001 Vlasta Prachatická : Portraits, Klenová Castle, Klatovy / Klenová Gallery
- 2003 Vlasta Prachatická, Municipal Museum and Gallery, Hořice v Podkrkonoší
- 2016 Markéta and Vlasta Prachatická: Portraits and Drawings, 1st Floor Gallery, Prague
- 2018 Vlasta Prachatická - Portraits, Museum Kampa, Prague, 27 October 2018 – 20 January 2019

=== Collective exhibitions (selection) ===
- 1952 Ausstellung Die tschechoslowakische Skulptur, Akademie der Künste, Berlin
- 1957 Exhibition of five artists (Prachatická, Kolíbal, Šimotová, John, Burant), Alšova síň Umělecké beseda, Prague 1
- 1967 5 Sculptors, Václav Špála Gallery, Prague
- 1971 Contemporary Czechoslovak art, Kuwait
- 1987 Czech Portrait 1877 - 1987, Central Bohemia Gallery, Prague
- 1994 Focal Points of Rebirth, Municipal Library, Prague
- 2015 Women Sculptors: A Selection of Significant Czech and Slovak Sculptors, Slovak National Gallery, Bratislava

== Sources ==
- Hynek Glos, Petr Vizina, Stará garda / Old Guard, nakl. Argo, Prague 2016, pp. 56–59, ISBN 978-80-257-1881-0
- Jiří Šetlík: Daisy Mrázková / Vlasta Prachatická, cat. 18 p., Gallery of the Czechoslovak Art Union on Charles Square, Prague 1961
- Vlasta Prachatická: Portraits, 1985, cat. 28 p., GHMP? Prague, Old Town Hall
- Václav Boštík et al., UB 12, cat. 41 p., Art Department of Umělecká Beseda (re-established 1990), Prague 1994
- Jiří Šetlík, Stanislav Kolíbal: Vlasta Prachatická - Portraits, Řevnice: Arbor vitae Publishing House, 2001. ISBN 80-86300-23-4
