= Miloslav Sádlo =

Background information
- Born: Miloslav Sádlo; 6 June 1897; Prague, Austria-Hungary
- Died: 30 October 1961 (aged 64) Prague, Czechoslovakia
- Genres: Classical
- Occupations: Violist, violin pedagogue
- Instrument: Viol
- Years active: 1926–1961
- Relatives: Karel Pravoslav Sádlo, cellist (brother)
- Formerly of: Czech Philharmonic Orchestra (Česká Filharmonie)

Miloslav Sádlo (June 6, 1897 in Prague, Austria-Hungary – October 30, 1961 in Prague, Czechoslovakia), was a violist and soloist in the Czech Philharmonic (Česká Filharmonie) where he was also executive and later orchestra director. Sádlo also played in the České Trio (Czech Trio), with Alexandr Plocek and Josef Páleníček, and in Micka Quartet, and was a member of the "Klub orchestrálních umělců" (Club of Orchestra Artists).

== Early life and education ==
Miloslav Sádlo was born in Prague into the family of a sole proprietor, the shoemaker Josef Sádlo and his wife Anna. After finishing primary school, he was allowed to go to the military in 1911, where he remained until 1919. Due to his interest in music, he was assigned to military music. After graduating from the military in 1919, he began to study in the Prague Conservatory where he studied in Professor J. Bastar's violin class until 1926. Already during his studies he began to teach the violin and for 20 years he taught a number of violinists.

== Career ==
In 1926 Sádlo was engaged by the Česká Filharmonie - the Czech Philharmonic Orchestra, where he was active until the autumn of 1961. From 1933 to 1945 he was a member of the Union of Professional Musicians, and from 1931 to 1946 in the committee of the Club of Orchestral Artists in Prague. He was on the committee of the Česká Filharmonie for 18 years. On October 22, 1945, he was involved in the establishment of the nationalization of the České Filharmonie. At that time, he was appointed orchestra director.

Miloslav Sádlo organized both domestic and foreign tours, where he also played the viola.

Foreign travel was mainly before the Second World War: to Italy, Yugoslavia, England, France, Switzerland, Austria, the Netherlands, Romania, and elsewhere. After 1945 he went to the Soviet Union, East Germany and West Germany.

In the fall of 1959 he went on a three-month tour to Australia, Japan, China and India. In Australia there was a concert for the local Czechoslovak community (there were a large number of Czech and Slovak emigrants after the war). Jawaharlal Nehru was present at a concert in India.

== Death ==
In October 1961, he died of ileus when doctors failed to operate on him in time.

== Notes ==
- Miloslav Sádlo. Viola School on a comparative basis - analogy with the violin verso viola - manuscript. Škola na violu na podkladě srovnávacím (in Czech) Prague.
- Miloslav Sádlo should not be confused with Miloš Sádlo, who played the cello and took the surname Sádlo after Karel Pravoslav Sádlo (brother of Miloslav Sádlo), his teacher.
