= Ladislav Černý =

Czech violist and teacher (1891–1975)

Ladislav Černý (13 April 1891 – 13 July 1975) was a Czech violist and teacher.

== Biography ==
Černý was born on 13 April 1891 in Plzeň in Bohemia, Austria-Hungary. He studied violin at the Prague Conservatory (1906–1912) with Ferdinand Lachner and Jindřich Bastař, and chamber music with František Spilka.

He became assistant concert master of the Czech Philharmonic (1916–1918) and in 1919 was accepted into the opera orchestra in Ljubljana, not as a violinist, but as principal violist (solo violist). While in Ljubljana, he taught at the Ljubljana Conservatory (Glasbena matica) and also founded the Zika Quartet (Zikovo kvarteto) in 1920 along with fellow countrymen Richard Zika (violin) and Ladislav Zika (cello), and Slovene violinist Karel Sancin. The Quartet returned to Prague in 1921 where it was called the Czechoslovak Quartet, and from 1929, the Prague Quartet. Černý remained as the violist of the ensemble for 46 years giving more than 1300 performances until it disbanded in the mid-1950s.

Černý was a pioneer for the viola in the former Czechoslovakia. He enjoyed a solo career often performing the solo viola part of Berlioz's Harold en Italie and other repertoire. In 1922 at the Festival of Contemporary Music in Donaueschingen, Černý befriended Paul Hindemith and they became lifelong friends. Hindemith dedicated his Sonata for Solo Viola, Op. 25 No. 1 (1922) to Černý.

From 1940 to 1952, Černý taught viola and chamber music at the Prague Conservatory, becoming Professor of Viola in 1945. Concurrently, he taught the same courses at the Academy of Performing Arts from 1946 to 1958, initially as associate professor, then later when his mobility deteriorated in 1952, he taught from his apartment, which in time became a major artistic meeting place. Černý's numerous students include violists Lubomír Malý, Karel Řehák and Karel Doležal, as well as many chamber musicians.

Černý had a constant devotion to Czech avant-garde technical innovations which blossomed in 1966. He performed works by Miroslav Krejčí, Pavel Bořkovec, Alois Hába, Iša Krejčí, Jindřich Feld, Jiří Jaroch, Jiří Matys, Josef Matěj, Jan Kapr and Jan Tausinger among others. Numerous compositions were initiated by Černý and many were dedicated to him. Černý's viola playing excelled in virtuoso technique, with remarkable temperament, beauty and expressiveness of tone.

In 1955, Černý was named an Artist of Merit (Zasloužilý umělec) and in 1971 People's Artist (Národní umělec).

Černý owned and played a very large German viola which was once thought to be made by Giovanni Battista Grancino.

Černý died on 13 July 1975 in Dobříš.

== Discography ==
=== Viola ===
- Hector Berlioz: Harold en Italie, Op. 16 – Ladislav Černý (viola); Václav Jiráček (conductor); Czech Philharmonic; Supraphon (1953, 1954)
- Bloch and Britten – Ladislav Černý (viola); Josef Páleníček (piano); Supraphon 1110847G (1959, with Britten: 1970, 1971)
  - Ernest Bloch: Suite for viola and piano (1919)
  - Benjamin Britten: Lachrymae, Reflections on a Song by John Dowland for viola and piano, Op. 48 (1950)
- František Brož: Jarní sonáta (Spring Sonata; Frühlingssonate) for viola and piano, Op. 18 (1946) – Ladislav Černý (viola); Jan Panenka (piano); Supraphon LPM 458 (1957)
- Osvald Chlubna: Sonatina for viola and piano, Op. 119 – Ladislav Černý (viola); Jarmila Kozderková (piano); Panton 11 0312 (1972)
- Paul Hindemith: Viola Works – Ladislav Černý (viola); Jan Panenka (piano); Martin Turnovský (conductor); Prague Chamber Orchestra; recorded 1957–1961; Supraphon SU 3021-2 911 (1991)
  - Sonata in F for viola and piano, Op. 11 No. 4 (1919)
  - Sonata for solo viola, Op. 25 No. 1 (1922)
  - Trauermusik for viola and orchestra (1936)
- Arthur Honegger: Sonata for viola and piano, H. 28 (1920) – Ladislav Černý (viola); Josef Páleníček (piano); Supraphon SUF 20036 (1953)
- Hummel, Reger and Tausinger – Ladislav Černý (viola); Jarmila Kozderková (piano); Brigita Šulcová (soprano); Panton 11 0430 (1974)
  - Johann Nepomuk Hummel: Sonata in E♭ major for viola and piano, Op. 5 No. 3
  - Max Reger: Suite No. 1 in G minor for viola solo, Op. 131d (1915)
  - Jan Tausinger: Duetti Compatibili for soprano and viola (1971)
- Jan Tausinger: Concertino meditazione for viola and chamber orchestra (1965) – Ladislav Černý (viola); František Vajnar (conductor); Czech Philharmonic; Supraphon
- Ladislav Černý (viola); Josef Páleníček (piano); Supraphon (1960)
  - Johann Sebastian Bach: Air from Suite No. 3 in D major
  - Henry Eccles: Allegro vivace from Sonata in G minor
  - George Frideric Handel: Andante ma non troppo
  - Robert Schumann: Snění (Träumerei)

=== Chamber music ===
- Johannes Brahms: String Quartet No. 3 – Prague Quartet; Supraphon (1950)
- Leoš Janáček: String Quartet No. 2 – Černý Quartet; Ultraphon (1943); Supraphon (1948)
- Robert Schumann: String Quartet in A major, Op. 41 No. 3 – Prague Quartet
- Erwin Schulhoff: 5 Pieces (Pět kusů) for string quartet (1923) – Prague Quartet; Supraphon (1962)
