= Alexandre Rudajev =

American classical composer

Alexander Rudajev
- Born: Prague, Czechoslovakia; 13 February 1935 (age 91)
- Died: 27 July 2002
- Education: Prague Conservatory
- Occupations: Composer, psychiatrist

Alexander Rudajev (13 February 1935 in Prague - 27 July 2002) was a composer and psychiatrist. He was trained at the Prague Conservatory. In 1962, he moved to Paris to study composition with the legendary teacher Nadia Boulanger. He went to medical school to provide what he called a "backup" profession (according to the St. Petersburg Times), and specialized in psychiatry, but continued to compose professionally as well. In 1969, he moved to New York City; eventually, he moved to Florida, where his psychiatric practice was in Clearwater.

His music is published by C. F. Peters and Editions Combre. Prizes and honorable mentions have been given to his compositions at the 1966 Prague Spring Festival, the 1988 Musician's Accord Composers Competition in New York, and the Sigvald Thompson Composition Competition in Fargo-Moorhead, ND. Among the conductors who have led performances of his compositions are, JoAnn Falletta, Yehudi Menuhin, and Julius Rudel.
