= Staré Smrkovice =

- Municipality
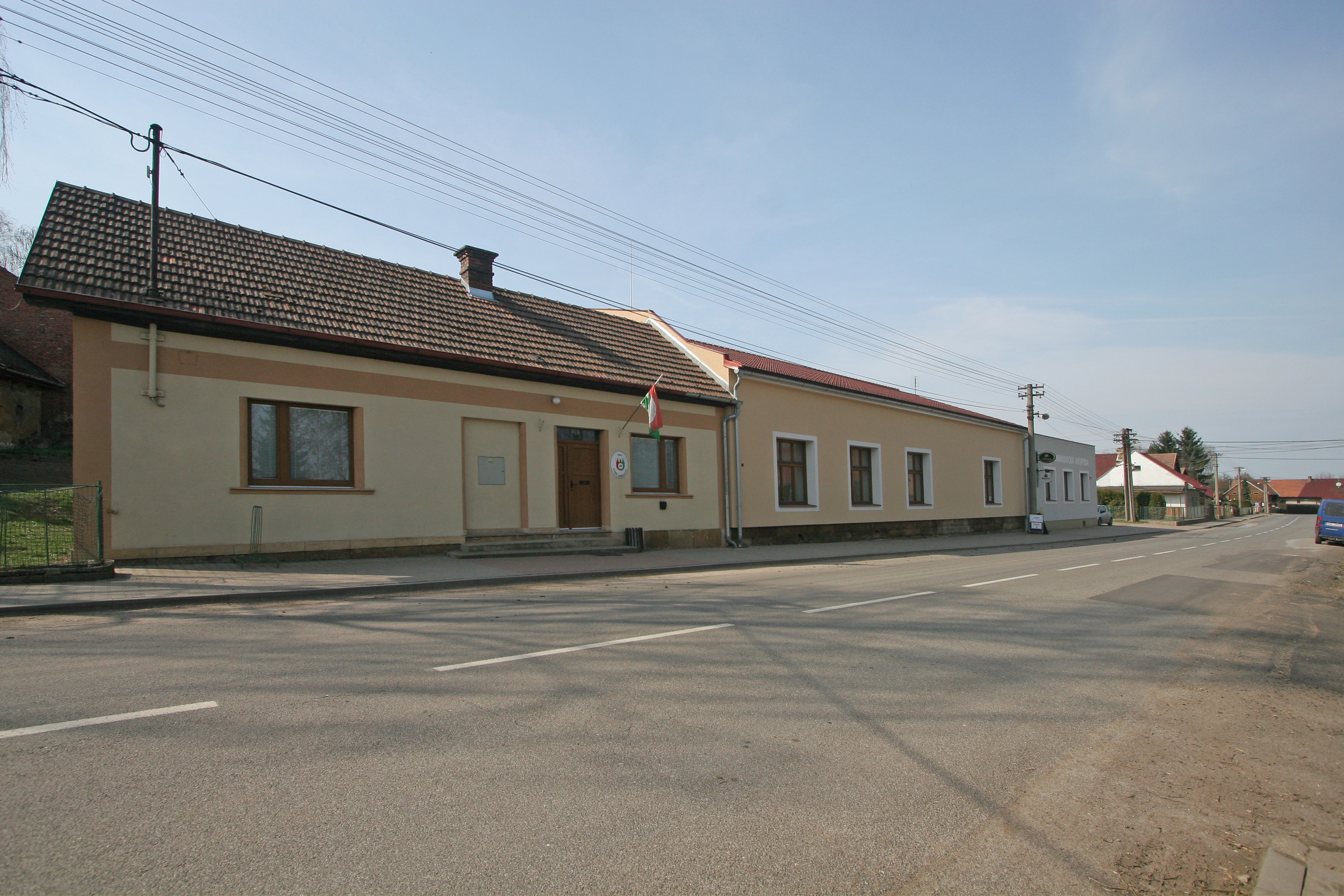
- Municipal office

- Flag Coat of arms

- Location in the Czech Republic
- Coordinates: 50°20′12″N 15°29′41″E
- Country: Czech Republic
- Region: Hradec Králové
- District: Jičín
- First mentioned: 1297

Area
  - Total: 5.21 km^{2} (2.01 sq mi)
- Elevation: 250 m (820 ft)

Population (2026-01-01)
  - Total: 265
  - Density: 50.9/km^{2} (132/sq mi)
- Time zone: UTC+1 (CET)
  - Summer (DST): UTC+2 (CEST)
- Postal code: 508 01
- Website: www.staresmrkovice.cz

Staré Smrkovice is a municipality and village in Jičín District in the Hradec Králové Region of the Czech Republic. It has about 300 inhabitants.

== Demographics ==
Historical population
Year	Pop.	±%
1869	733	—
1880	705	−3.8%
1890	713	+1.1%
1900	674	−5.5%
1910	731	+8.5%
1921	638	−12.7%
1930	608	−4.7%
1950	423	−30.4%
1961	357	−15.6%
1970	319	−10.6%
1980	259	−18.8%
1991	221	−14.7%
2001	228	+3.2%
2011	257	+12.7%
2021	246	−4.3%
Source: Censuses

== Notable people ==
- Vlasta Prachatická (1929–2022), sculptor
