= Prague Quartet =

The Prague Quartet (Czech: Pražské kvarteto; German: Prager Quartett) was a string quartet based in Prague that existed from 1920 to 1955. Along with the Ševčík Quartet and Bohemian Quartet, it was one of the foremost chamber ensembles of the interwar years.

== History ==
The beginnings of the ensemble date back to 1919, when Richard Zika (1st violin) together with his brother Ladislav Zika (cello), Mirek Dezel (viola) and Ivo Trost (2nd violin) founded the Jugoslavenski Quartet. The members of the quartet played in the orchestra of the Slovene National Theatre in Ljubljana. Ladislav Černý later replaced Dezel on viola and Slovene violinist Karel Sancin took the post of Ivo Trost. The Zika brothers and Černý, expatriate Czechs working in Ljubljana, founded the Zika Quartet (Zikovo kvarteto) together with Karel Sancin in 1920. Their first performance took place in Ptuj on March 22, 1920. The Quartet relocated to Prague in 1921 where it was called the Czechoslovak Quartet (Československé kvarteto), and from 1929, the Prague Quartet. During the 1920s, the ensemble travelled and performed extensively around Czechoslovakia and Europe. In 1927, the Prague Quartet undertook a six month-tour of South America.

During the 1930s, the Prague Quartet was composed of Willibald Schweyda (Violin I), Berger (Violin II), Černý (Viola) and Večtomov (Cello).

During World War II when the Germans forbade nationalistic titles, it was known as the Černý Quartet (Černé kvarteto, 1943–1944).

The quartet toured extensively and helped to promote the music of Paul Hindemith, with whom Černý was associated. Playing with exceptional rhythmic vitality, tonal quality and technical address, the group influenced generations of Czech musicians. The quartet made several recordings including works of Antonín Dvořák, Bedřich Smetana, Leoš Janáček, Johannes Brahms and Robert Schumann.

The quartet disbanded in 1955 and soon, with Černý's encouragement, Břetislav Novotný, the quartet's final second violinist, founded the City of Prague Quartet (Kvarteto města Prahy), also known as the Prague String Quartet (Prager Streichquartett).

== Personnel ==
Violin I

- Richard Zika (1920–1933)
- Willibald Schweyda (Vilibald Schwejda) (1933–1941)
- Alexandr Plocek (1941–1951)
- Josef Suk (1951)
- Břetislav Novotný (1951–1954)
- Karel Šroubek (1954–1966)

Violin II

- Ivo Trost (1919)
- Karel Sancin (1920–1923)
- Herbert Berger (1923–1954)
- Břetislav Novotný (1954–1955)
- Jiří Baxa (1955–1966)

Viola

- Mirek Dezel (1919)
- Ladislav Černý (1920–1966)

Cello

- Ladislav Zika (1920–1931)
- Miloš Sádlo (1931–1933)
- Ivan Večtomov (1933–1941, 1951–1966)
- Josef Šimandl (1941–1951)
