= Vilém Veverka =

Czech oboist (b. 1978)

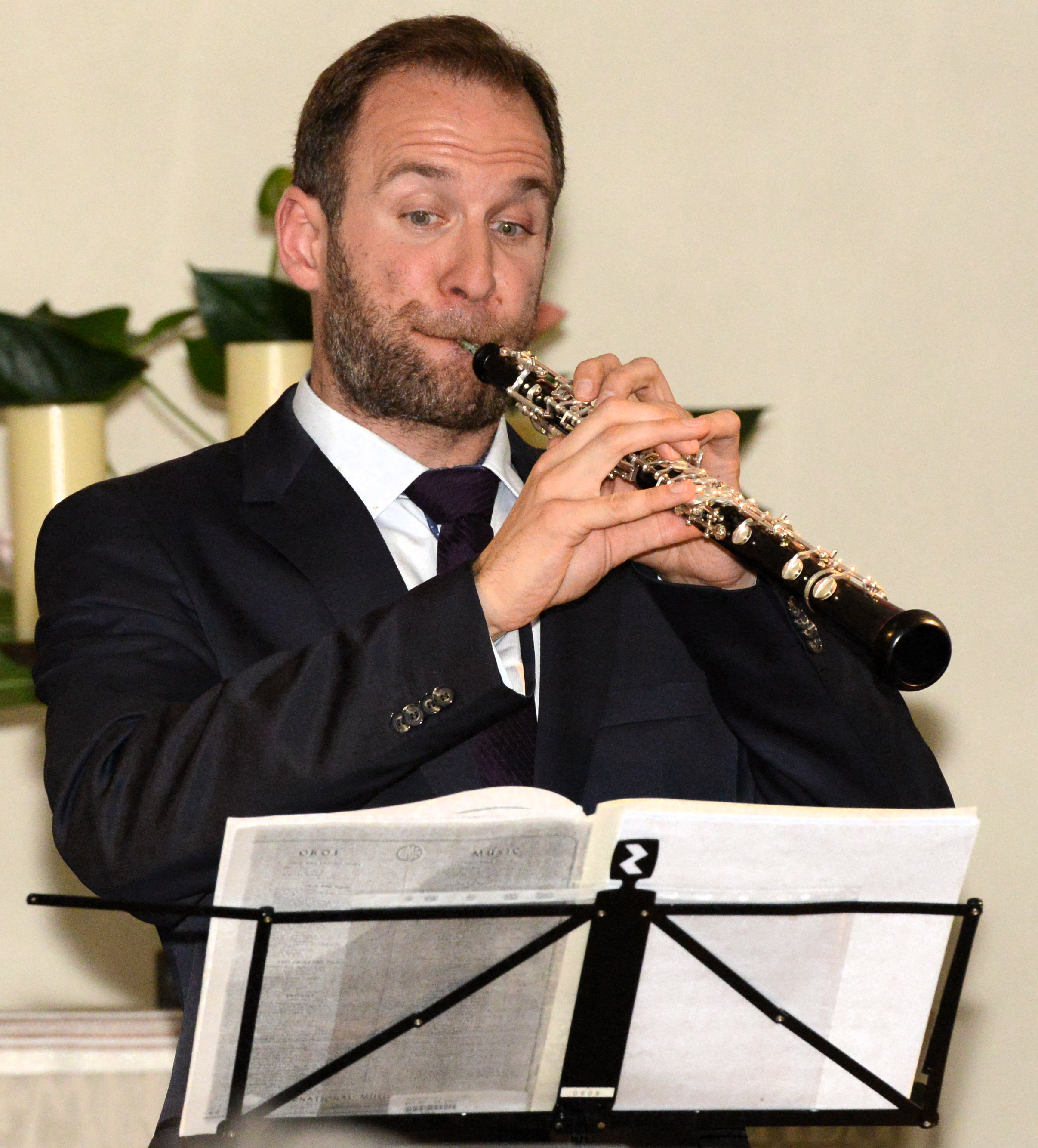
Vilém Veverka (2015)

Vilém Veverka (also sometimes written as Vilem Veverka) (born 5 February 1978 in Prague) is a Czech oboist. He is the winner of the 7th International Tokyo Oboe Competition and a soloist.

== Career ==
After studying at the Prague Conservatory with František Xaver Thuri and later at the Academy of Performing Arts in Prague, he studied at the Hochschule für Musik Hanns Eisler and interned at the Berlin Philharmonic. He produced a complete recording of Georg Philipp Telemann’s Twelve Fantasias for Supraphon and notably performed all Jan Dismas Zelenka's Trio Sonatas, with the Ensemble Berlin-Prag, which he co-founded in 2011. Vilém Veverka is a soloist of the Brno Philharmonic and an ambassador of France's Buffet Crampon. In 2014 he was an Artist in Residence at Germany's Mitte Europa festival.

== Recordings ==
- 2015 – Vivaldi, Bach, Telemann - Oboe Concertos (Recorded with Dominik Wollenweber and Ensemble 18+ for Supraphon).
- 2017 – Impressions / Ravel, Debussy, Sluka: Works for Oboe and Harp.
- 2017 – Mozart, Beethoven, Klein: Music for Wind Instruments.
- 2018 – Zelenka: Trio Sonatas ZWV 181.
- 2020 – Next Horizon, with Ultimate W Band
