= Jan Tausinger =

Czech conductor and composer (1921–1980)

Jan Tausinger (1 November 1921 in Piatra Neamţ – 29 July 1980 in Prague) was a Romania-born ethnic Czech violist, conductor and composer.

== Biography ==
Tausinger studied composition at the Bucharest Conservatory as a pupil of Dimitrie Cuclin and Mihail Jora. Later, he continued his studies at the Academy of Performing Arts in Prague with Pavel Bořkovec and Alois Hába. From 1948 to 1952, he studied also conducting with Metod Doležil and Karel Ančerl.

== Selected works ==
Orchestral

- Symphony No. 1 "Liberation" (1952)
- Confrontazione I., II. (1964)
- Confrontazione III. for string quartet and orchestra (1965)
- Musica evolutiva for chamber orchestra (1970)
- Setkání ve svobodném máji (1975)
- Sinfonia slovacca (1978–1979)
- Promiňte, Mistře..., Little Rondo

Wind ensemble

- Naše klarinety (Our Clarinets), Fantasy-Polka for wind ensemble (1962)
- Preludium – Sarabanda – Postludium for wind ensemble, harp, piano and percussion (1967)

Concertante

- Concert for violin and orchestra (1962–1963)
- Concertino-meditazione for viola and chamber orchestra (1965)
- Improvisations "Hommage à J. S. Bach" for piano and orchestra (1970)

Chamber music

- Sonata for violin and piano (1953–1954)
- Partita for viola and piano (1954)
- Le Avventure di un flauto e un'arpa (The Adventures of a Flute and a Harp), Duo Breve for flute and harp (1965)
- Sonatina emancipata for trumpet and piano (1968)
- Hommage à Ladislav Černý for viola and piano (1971)
- On rêvient toujours ..., Suite for violin and piano (1974)
- Comme il faut, Sonatina for oboe and piano (1974)
- ... Au dernière amour, Sonata-Suite for cello and piano (1974–1975)
- Sonata for clarinet and piano (1975)
- Two Essays for Due Boemi for bass clarinet and piano (1977)
- 4 Kusy (4 Pieces) for bassoon and piano (1977)
- Korelace (Correlation) for accordion (1978)
- Trio No. 1 for violin, viola and cello (1960)
- String Quartet No. 1 (1961)
- Trio No. 2 for violin, viola and cello (1964–1965)
- String Quartet No. 2 (1966)
- String Quartet No. 3 (1966)
- Colloquio (Colloquium) for flute, oboe, clarinet and bassoon (1968)
- Quintet for 2 trumpets, horn and 2 trombones (1968)
- Dva apostrofy (Two Apostrophes) for wind quintet (1968)
- Canto di speranza for violin, viola, cello and piano (1969)
- String Quartet No. 4 "Struktury" ("Structures") (1969)
- Hukvaldský nonet (Hukvaldy Nonet) for flute, oboe, clarinet, horn, bassoon, violin, viola, cello and double bass (1974)
- Nerovnoramennost (Lopsidedness), Trio for flute, cello and piano (1974)
- 4 Evocations for flute, viola, cello and piano (1976)
- Nonet No. 2 "Črty" ("Sketches") for flute, oboe, clarinet, horn, bassoon, violin, viola, cello and double bass (1976)
- Nonet No. 3 "Reminiscences" for flute, oboe, clarinet, horn, bassoon, violin, viola, cello and double bass (1976)
- Sextet for flute, oboe, clarinet, bassoon, horn and piano (1974–1976)
- Interference for violin, horn and piano (1977)
- 7 Mikrochromofonií (7 Michrochromophonies) for clarinet, viola and piano (1977)
- Quatre nuances (4 Nuances) for flute, harp, violin, viola and cello (1978)
- Tři odstíny (3 Shades) for flute, harp, violin, viola and cello (1979)
- Collage for guitar
- Cyklus 9 skladbiček (Cycle of 9 Little Pieces) for 2 clarinets, 2 (or 3) trumpets, 2 trombones and percussion
- De rebus musicalibus for flute, bass clarinet, piano, harpsichord and vibraphone
- Etudy (Studies) for flute and cello
- Kruhy (Circles) for solo flute or flute and piano

Piano

- Sonata for piano (1948–1950)
- Ten Dodecaphonic Studies (10 Etud) (1972)

Vocal

- Zpěvy míru (Songs of Peace), 3 Folk Cantatas for voice and piano (1951)
- Láska (Love), Cycle of Songs to Japanese Quatrains for soprano and piano (1964)
- Čmáranice na nebi (Scribbling in the Sky), Song Cycle for soprano and chamber ensemble (1967); text by Velemir Khlebnikov
- Duetti compatibili "Nulový bod" (Zero Point) for soprano and viola (1971); poetry by Erik Lindgreen
- Ave Maria for soprano, narrator and orchestra (1972)
- Constellation, Song Cycle for soprano and piano (1975)
- Pražská domovní znamení (Prague House Signs), Song Cycle for soprano and piano (1976); text by Vítězslav Nezval
- Výchozí bod (Point of Departure) for soprano and 2 violins (1979–80); poetry by Erik Lindgreen

Choral

- Já budu vždycky věřit v máj (I Shall Always Believe in May) for female chorus (1959); text by Jan Noha
- Haló, voláme svět, Song for mixed chorus with accompaniment (1959); text by Erich Sojka
- Závrať (Dizziness) for mixed chorus and orchestra (1964)
- Správná věc (The Right Thing), Symphonic Picture for tenor solo, mixed chorus and orchestra (1966–1967)
- Houby (Mushrooms), Cycle for children's chorus, bass clarinet and tuba (or piano) (1971); poems by Josef Hanzlík
- Vyhlášení dobré mysli (Declaration of Good Cheer) for mixed chorus (1972); poems by D. Burlyuk
- Sinfonia bohemica for baritone, male chorus, harpsichord, trumpet and orchestra (1973–1975); texts from Jan Ámos Komenský, Julius Fučík and Jaroslav Heyrovský
- Labutí peříčko (The Swan's Little Feather), Song Cycle for children's chorus and chamber ensemble (1976)
- Oči milenek (Eyes of Lady Lovers) for female chorus (1977); poems by Vítězslav Nezval
- Vrh kostek (A Game of Dice) for mixed chorus a cappella (1979); verses by Stéphane Mallarmé
- Kantáta o komunistické straně for alto, bass, mixed chorus and orchestra

Film scores

- Borisek – malý serzhant (1976)
