= Prague Conservatory =

Music school in the Czech Republic

- Pražská konzervatoř

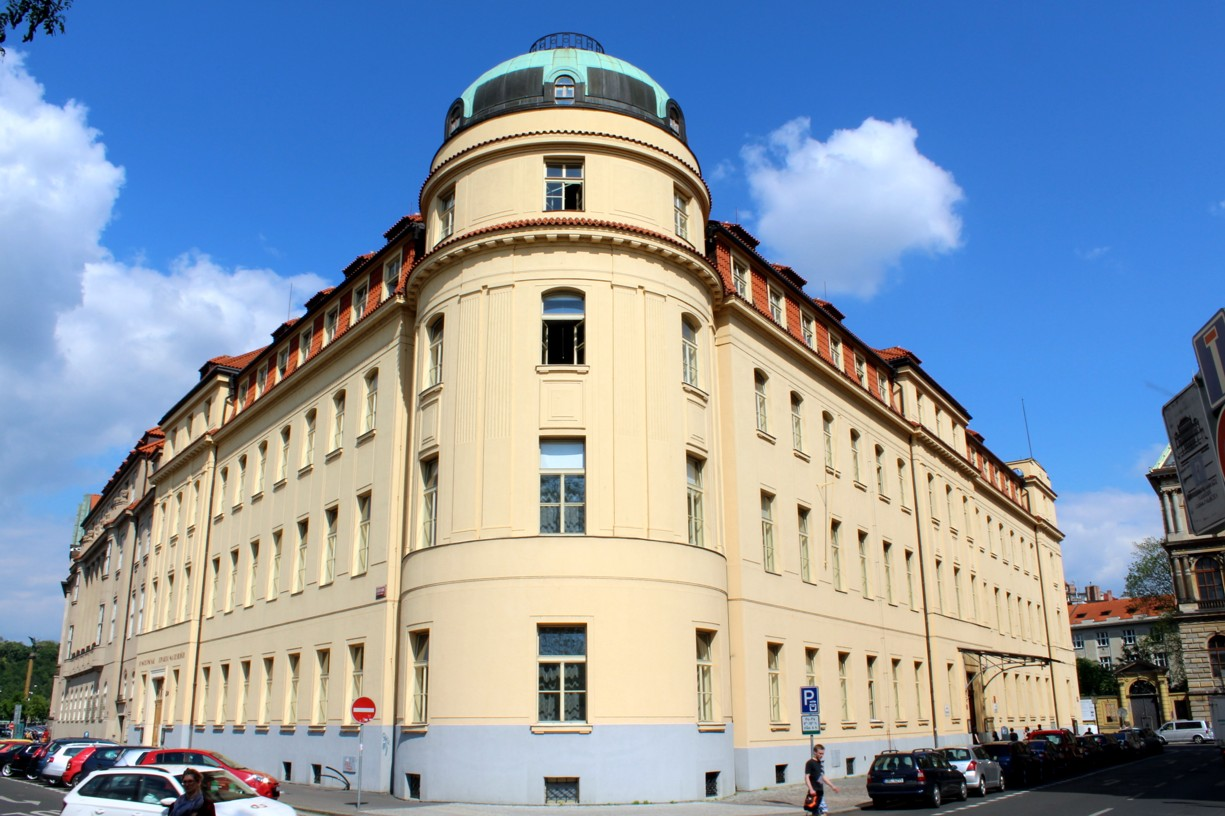
- Main building

Location
- Na rejdišti 77/1, Prague 1 Czech Republic; 50°05′26″N 14°24′57″E

Information
- Type: Music school
- Established: 24 April 1808
- Founders: František Josef of Vrtba; František Josef of Sternberg and Manderscheid; Jan Nepomuk Nostitz-Rieneck; Kristián Kryštof Clam-Gallas; Bedřich Nostitz; Karel of Firmian; Jan Josef Pachta of Rájov; František Josef of Klebelsberg
- Gender: Coeducational
- Language: Czech
- Website: prazskakonzervator.cz

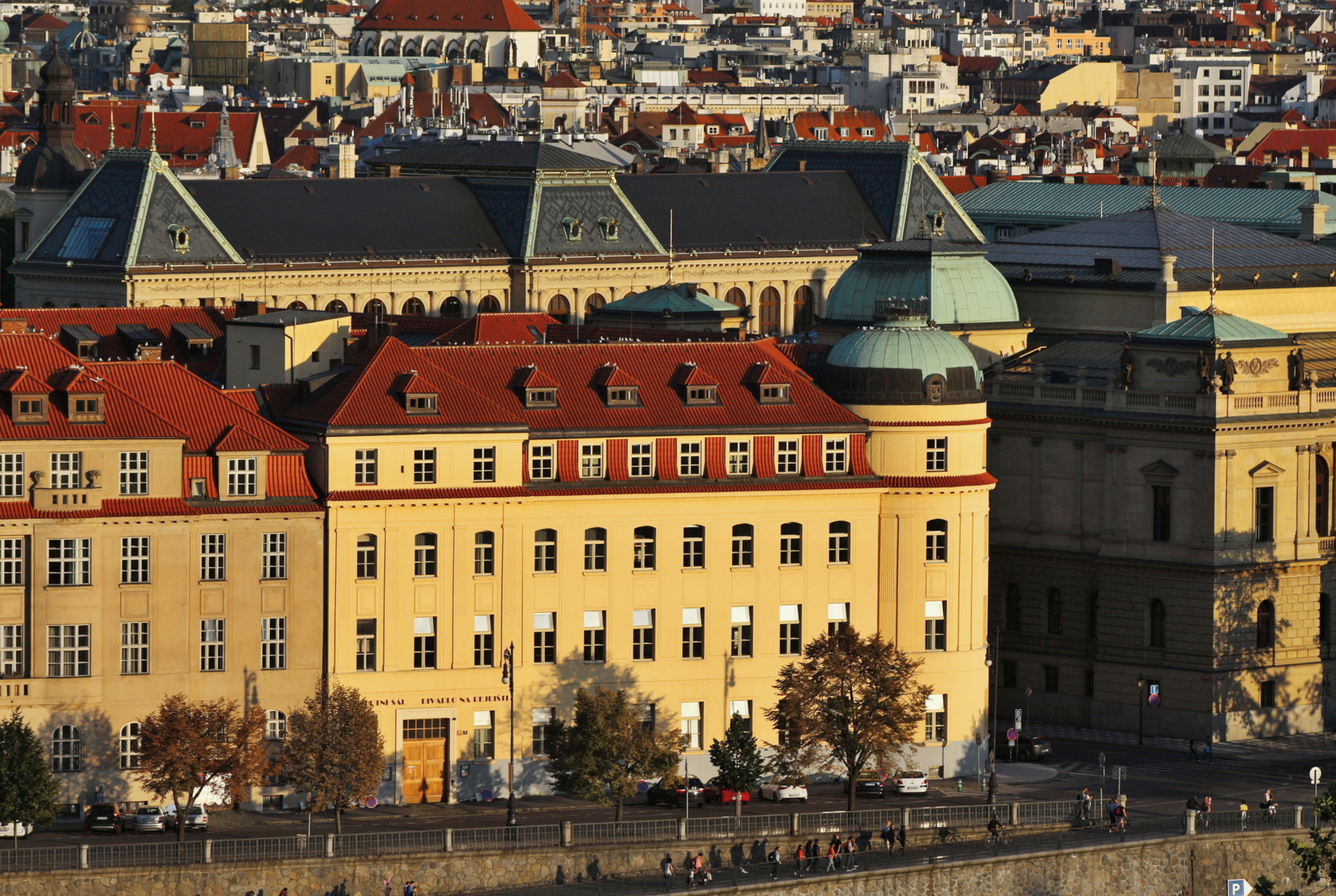
Main building of the Prague Conservatory, viewed from Letná hill

The Prague Conservatory (Czech: Pražská konzervatoř) is a public music school in Prague, Czech Republic, founded in 1808. Currently, the school offers four- or six-year courses, which can be compared to the level of a high school diploma in other countries. Graduates can continue their training by enrolling in an institution that offers undergraduate education.

== History ==
The Prague Conservatory was founded in 1808 by local aristocrats and burghers following the example of the Conservatoire de Paris (est. 1795) and the Milan Conservatory (est. 1807). The founders are listed as František Josef of Vrtba, František Josef of Sternberg and Manderscheid, Jan Nepomuk Nostitz-Rieneck, Kristián Kryštof Clam-Gallas, Bedřich Nostitz, Karel of Firmian, Jan Josef Pachta of Rájov, and František Josef of Klebelsberg.

In 1810, the Union for the Improvement of Music in Bohemia (Jednota pro zvelebení hudby v Čechách) was formed, which ensured the financial operation of the school for the next hundred years. Classes started in 1811, after a delay caused by the Napoleonic Wars.

Bedřich Diviš Weber was appointed the first director of the school, which was originally located in the monastery next to St. Giles' Church.

In 1891, Antonín Dvořák joined the faculty as head of the composition department and served as the school's director between 1901 and 1904. Dvořák's students included the composers Vítězslav Novák, Josef Suk (who later also served as director of the conservatory), Rudolf Friml, Oskar Nedbal, and Franz Lehár. Another director of the school was pianist Vilém Kurz.

In 1945, a number of professors and students of higher classes at the conservatory left to found the Academy of Performing Arts. Theatre and ballet departments were also opened that year, from which the independent Dance Conservatory was created in 2001.

== Instruction ==
The Prague Conservatory offers instruction in several instruments, including accordion, guitar, piano, and organ, as well as in singing, composition, conducting, and acting. The institution has its own symphonic and chamber orchestras, a choir, and a theatre company.

== Locations ==
The conservatory's main campus is located at Na rejdišti 77/1, Prague 1. It has two ancillary locations: one situated within Pálffyho Palace, in Prague's Malá Strana, and the other in Prague's Old Town.

== Directors ==
The following is a list of directors of the Prague Conservatory:

- Bedřich Diviš Weber 1811–1843
- Jan Bedřich Kittl 1843–1865
- Josef Krejčí 1865–1881
- Antonín Bennewitz 1882–1901
- Antonín Dvořák 1901–1904
- Karel Knittl 1904–1907
- Jindřich Kàan z Albestů 1907–1918
- Vítězslav Novák 1918–1922
- Josef Bohuslav Foerster 1922–1923
- Josef Suk 1923–1928
- Josef Bohuslav Foerster 1928–1930
- Vilém Kurz 1930–1939
- Jaroslav Kocián 1939–1940
- Václav Holzknecht 1942–1970
- Jan Tausinger 1971–1976
- František Martiník 1976–1989
- Věroslav Neumann 1989–2004
- Pavel Trojan 2004-2018
- Petr Čech 2018–2024
- Ivo Kahánek 2025–present

== Notable alumni ==
- Karel Ančerl
- František Bartoš
- Jiří Bělohlávek
- František Brikcius
- František Brož
- Oliver Butterworth
- Andrea Černá
- Ladislav Černý
- Ludmila Červinková
- Radim Drejsl
- Gabriela Eibenová
- Maria Forescu
- Rudolf Friml
- Julius Fučík
- Jarmila Gerbič
- Wolfgang Hildemann
- Jan Hřímalý
- Jan Hrubý
- Kateřina Jalovcová
- Jaroslav Ježek
- Jana Jonášová
- Jan Kalivoda
- Naděžda Kniplová
- Pavel Kohout
- Jan Kubelík
- Rafael Kubelík
- Otomar Kvěch
- Franz Lehar
- Manoah Leide-Tedesco
- Zuzana Marková
- Bohuslav Martinů
- Pauline Metzler-Löwy
- Oskar Nedbal
- Václav Neumann
- Vítězslav Novák
- Jana Obrovská
- Karel Paukert
- Michael Pospíšil
- Alexandre Rudajev
- Karel Pravoslav Sádlo
- Miloslav Sádlo
- František Salzer
- George Schick
- Otakar Ševčík
- Franz Simandl
- Lucijan Marija Škerjanc
- Yngve Sköld
- Josef Slavik
- Václav Smetáček
- Eugen Suchoň
- Josef Suk
- Jana Sýkorová
- Jan Talich
- Václav Talich
- Jiří Tancibudek
- Jan Thuri
- Václav Vaca
- Vilém Veverka
- Tomáš Víšek
- Sláva Vorlová
- Pavla Vykopalová
- John Stepan Zamecnik

== Notable faculty ==
- František Brož
- Ladislav Černý
- Kateřina Emingerová
- Emil Hlobil
- Valentina Kameníková
- Saša Večtomov
