= Jean-Louis Capezzali =

French oboist

Jean-Louis Capezzali is a French classical oboist born in 1959 in Saint-Étienne.

== Biography ==
Born in Saint-Étienne, Capezzali began learning music at the age of nine with the piano and discovered the oboe at the age of 14, listening to a recording of Vivaldi's concerti performed by Pierre Pierlot.

After studying one year at the Schola Cantorum de Paris, he entered the "classes à horaires aménagé musique" (CHAM) at the CNR in Versailles where he studied oboe with Gaston Longatte. He won the Gold Medal and the Honorary Prize and obtained the Certificate of Qualification (CA) as an oboe teacher.

In 1979, at the age of twenty, he was named first solo oboe of the Concerts Lamoureux. In 1984, he was awarded the first solo oboe at the Orchestre philharmonique de Radio France. He is also a prizewinner of the International Competitions of Geneva (1982) and Prague (1986).

In 1988, after assuming the post of assistant in Maurice Bourgue's class at the CNSM de Paris, he replaced him as a full professor when the former left for the conservatoire de Genève. Since 1998, he has been teaching at the Conservatoire national supérieur de musique et de danse de Lyon where he is also responsible for the pedagogical responsibility of the department of woodwind instruments. He is also professor of oboe at the Haute École de Musique of the Lausanne Conservatory.

Each year, he conducts advanced sessions in instrumental practice and in chamber music at the Britten school, Institut Supérieur de Musique de Périgueux, and trains the next generation of oboists in international academies such as Telč in the Czech Republic, Musicalp à Courchevel, and the Pablo Casals Festival in Prades.

In parallel to these activities, he leads a career as a camerist and as a soloist which leads him to perform with the greatest ensembles: Orchestre National Bordeaux Aquitaine, Orchestre de chambre de Paris, Orchestre de chambre de Toulouse etc. He is regularly invited to give concerts and master classes in China, Japan, Korea, Taiwan, Scandinavia, Russia, Germany, Spain, Poland, Czech Republic, USA, where he represents the French Wind School.

He has been working with Buffet Crampon since 1992 and has also contributed to the development of the oboe, particularly the Green Line oboe.

== Recordings ==
- Qigang Chen: Extase (Virgin Classics 2006)
- Jean Françaix, Georges Auric: Chamber music - Trios & sonatas (Arion 2005)
- Charles Koechlin: Sonatines 1 and 2 (Gallo 2002)
- Kurtag; Florentz; Ligeti; Pesson (Arion 1998)
- Wagner: Siegfried Idyll in E WWV103 (Gallo 1996)
- Mozart: Divertimento K136, Oboe Concerto K314 with the Orchestre National Bordeaux Aquitaine (Forlane 1996)
- Schumann Kalliwoda, Johann Peter Pixis: The Romantic Oboe (Disques Pierre Verany 1994)
- and also: Milhaud, Prokofiev, Poulenc, Martinu etc.
