= Karel Pravoslav Sádlo =

Czech cellist

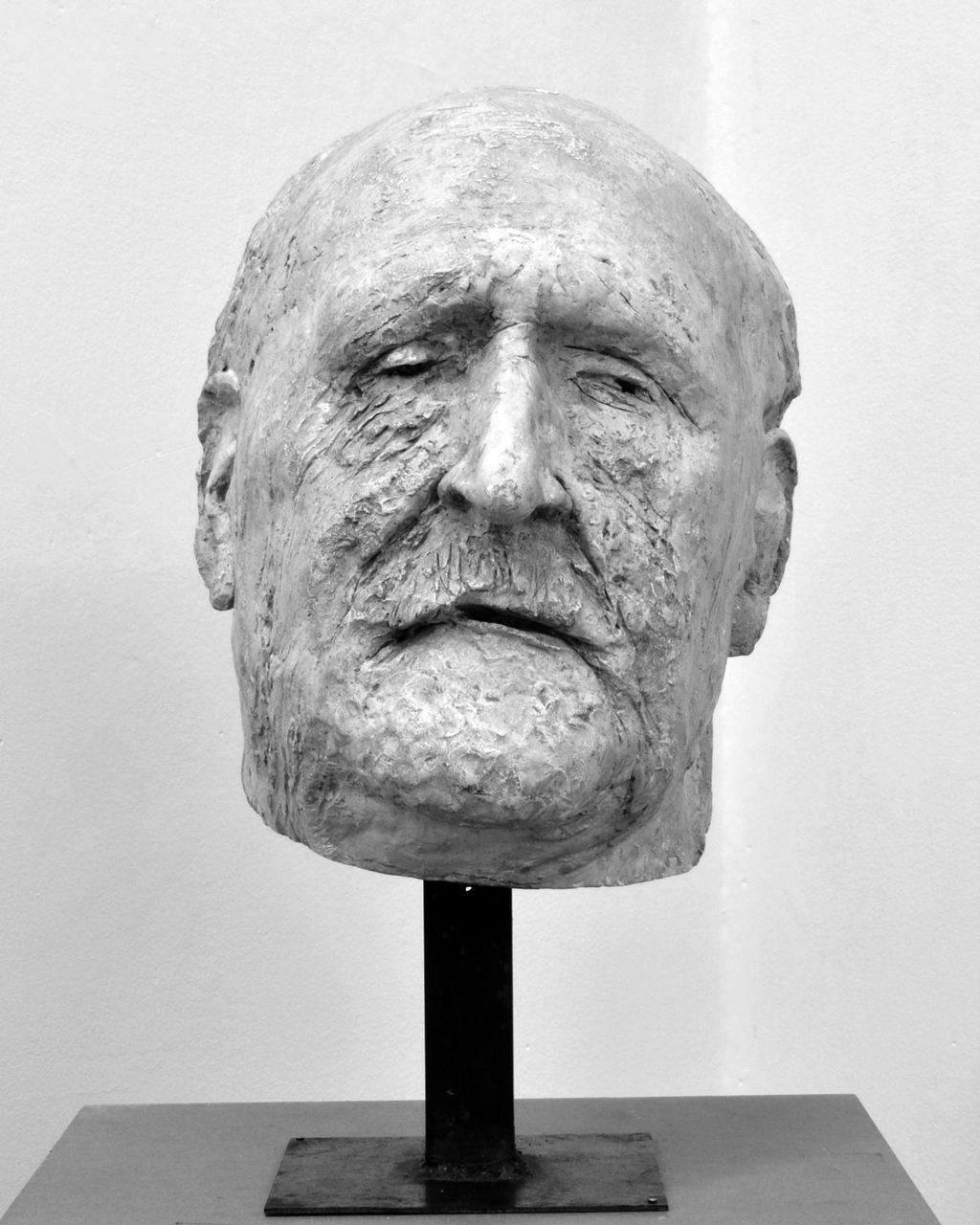
- A bust of Karel Pravoslav Sádlo by Vlasta Prachatická, his niece (1960)

Background information
- Born: 5 September 1898; Prague, Bohemia, Austria-Hungary
- Died: 24 August 1971 (aged 72) Prague, Czechoslovakia
- Genres: Classical
- Occupation(s): Cellist, cello pedagogue
- Instrument: Cello
- Years active: 1920–1965
- Relatives: Miloslav Sádlo, violist (brother); Vlasta Prachatická, portrait sculptor (niece)

Karel Pravoslav Sádlo (5 September 1898 – 24 August 1971) was a Czech cellist and cello pedagogue.

== Life ==
Sádlo was born on 5 September 1898 in Prague, Bohemia. Between 1928 and 1961, he was the teacher of the majority of Czech cellists and tutored a large number of leading soloists and chamber music performers (e.g. Miloš Sádlo, Josef Chuchro, František Sláma, Antonín Kohout). He was a teacher at the Prague Conservatory, dean of the Faculty of Music of the Academy of Performing Arts in Prague and a juror at prestigious performers' competitions.

His music publishing (Edition Sádlo, since 1928) as well as his new way of playing the cello (his book on cello technique was published in 1925) had a lasting influence on the development of modern Czech music.

Karel Pravoslav Sádlo was an active freemason. In 1937 he joined masonic lodge Bernard Bolzano in Prague, which was part of the National Czechoslovak Grand Lodge.

Sádlo died on 24 August 1971 in Prague, at the age of 72.
