= Stanislav Kolíbal =

Czech artist and sculptor

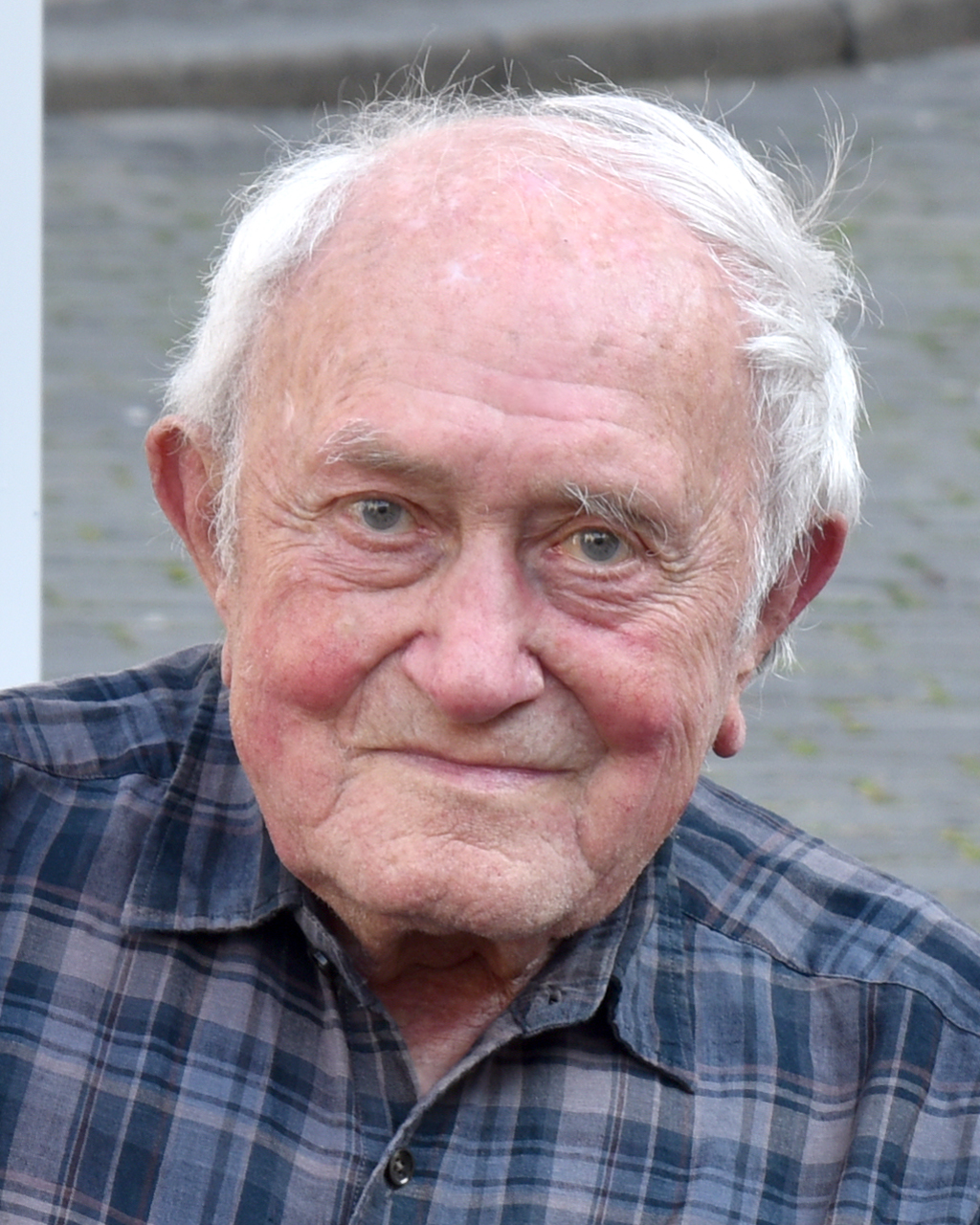
- Kolíbal in 2025
- Born: 11 December 1925 (age 100); Orlová, Czechoslovakia
- Education: Academy of Arts, Architecture and Design in Prague
- Known for: Sculpture

Signature
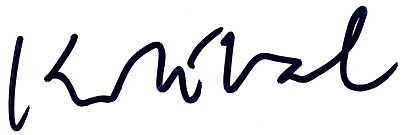

Stanislav Kolíbal (born 11 December 1925) is a Czech artist and sculptor.

== Work ==
His work is counted among the fundamentals of modern Czech art. Since the 1950s, Stanislav Kolíbal has been one of the most notable personalities on the Czech art scene. He was a leading figure in the group “UB 12”, which played an important role in the 1960s. His language is geometry, his predominant theme the relation of illusion and reality. Eventually his emphasis turned to the need for finding rules and order. It is a meditation on the problems engendered by and linked to man's presence on Earth.

From drawings used as ground plans, Stavby (Buildings), i.e. wooden and metal objects, that became Kolíbal's preoccupation since the second half of the 1980s, came into being. Stanislav Kolíbal has been drawing and sculpting simultaneously with his work in architecture and other creative pursuits for more than 60 years. His cycles of drawings are a key to the understanding of his highly sophisticated art.

He has exhibited in numerous museums and important exhibitions: the 5th exhibition of "the Sculpture of Twenty Nations" at the Guggenheim in New York, "Paris Prague" at the Musée d'Art Moderne de la Ville de Paris, and "Painting and Sculpture Today" (1980) at the Indianapolis Museum of Art.

In December 2025, he turned 100.
