= Josef Páleníček =

Czech piano virtuoso and composer (1914–1991)

Josef Páleníček

Josef Páleníček (July 19, 1914, Travnik, Bosnia, Austria-Hungary—March 7, 1991, Prague) was a Czech piano virtuoso and composer.

== Biography ==
Páleníček studied at the gymnasium in Prague, and concurrently he studied also at the Prague Conservatory. From 1933 to 1938 he continued his studies at the master school of Karel Hoffmeister. Simultaneously he studied law at the Charles University. He graduated from both schools in 1938. Páleníček was also a pupil of Vítězslav Novák and Otakar Šín. He completed his studies at the École Normale de Musique de Paris, where he studied under Diran Alexanian and Pierre Fournier. During his stay in Paris he studied also with Albert Roussel. From 1936 he started his career as a concert pianist and he became a solo pianist with the Czech Philharmonic Orchestra in 1949. However, his first public performance was at the age of 12 in 1926 in Olomouc. Following the World War II he also became a member of the Czechoslovak Communist Party.

Páleníček was appointed a professor at the Academy of Performing Arts in Prague in 1963. In 1984 he served on the jury of the Paloma O'Shea Santander International Piano Competition.

== Works ==
=== Orchestral compositions ===
- Concertino for orchestra (1945)
- Symphonic Variations on an Imaginary Portrait of Ilya Erenburg for large symphony orchestra (1971)

=== Concertant compositions ===
- 1st Concerto in C for piano and orchestra (string orchestra and timpani) (1940)
- 2nd Concerto in E flat for piano and orchestra (1952)
- 3rd Concerto for piano and small orchestra, for young pianists (1961)
- Concertino da camera in D for clarinet and orchestra (1957)
- Concerto for Flute and orchestra (1955)
- Concerto for Saxophone and orchestra (1944)

=== Compositions for chamber ensembles ===
- Preludium a Capriccio for violin and piano (1935)
- Suita piccola for violin and piano (1958)
- Variations on a Choral Song of the XVIIth Century for violoncello and piano (1942)
- Sonata for clarinet and piano (1936)
- Partita piccola for clarinet and piano (1943)
- Masks, two compositions for saxophone and piano (1957)
- 1st String Quartet (1954)
- Piano Quintet (1933)
- Variations on his own theme for violoncello and piano (1972)
- Rondo Concertante for violoncello and piano (1972)
- Trio Sonata for oboe, mezzo-soprano and piano (1965)

=== Compositions for piano ===
- Sonata (1936)
- Piano Sketchbook (cycle of five compositions), (1939)

=== Choral compositions ===
- Songs to Chinese poetry for soprano and piano (ossia for baritone and piano), Czech translation of verses by B. Mathesius (1947)
- My Lai, for mezzo-soprano and piano (1971)
- Blown Traces, cycle of men s choirs (1958)

=== Cantatas ===
- Song of Man, full-length oratorio for soloists, mixed choir and large orchestra, folk choir and folk soloists and children's choir (1960)

=== Instructive compositions ===
- Czech Fairytales (1940)
- From the Notebook of a Small Boy, 7 short compositions for violoncello and piano (ossia bassoon and piano, bass clarinet and piano) (1972)
- Abacus for children's choir, piano, trumpet, clarinet and percussion instruments (1973)
