= Miloš Sádlo =

Czech cellist

Miloš Sádlo (13 April 1912 – 14 October 2003), was a Czech cellist born in Prague.

== Life ==
Born Miloš Bláha, later Miloš Zátvrzský after his step-father. He started his musical education by playing violin when he was 8 years old. At 15 he switched to cello and began his studies with Karel Pravoslav Sádlo. After studying for 10 hours every day for 3 years he was invited to play cello concertos of Jaroslav Řídký and Antonín Dvořák with Czech Philharmonic. Around this time Zátvrzský took the name Sádlo after his teacher. In 1931 he joined the Prague Quartet, and went to UK tour with them in 1932. They made a highly praised recording of Dvořák's String Quartet No. 13. Next year Sádlo quit the quartet to focus on his solo career.

In 1947 he recorded Shostakovich's Piano trio in E-minor with violinist David Oistrakh and the composer himself on the piano. In 1955 Sádlo spent six months in Prades, France, studying with Pablo Casals. At various points of his life he was a member of the Czech Trio, Suk Trio, Prague Trio and the Prague Chamber Trio. After meeting Bohuslav Martinů through Rafael Kubelík he premiered the revised version of Martinů's Cello Concerto No. 1. Sádlo also premiered works by Viktor Kalabis (1952), Ivan Řezáč (1963), Vladimír Sommer (1981) and Martin Smolka (1982).

Sádlo taught violoncello at Prague Academy for Music, Indiana University, and the University of San Diego in California.

On 19 May 1962 he premiered the newly discovered Joseph Haydn's Cello Concerto No. 1 in C major with Czechoslovak Radio Symphony Orchestra conducted by Sir Charles Mackerras.

In 1989 he played as a guest artist in Zoltan Rozsnyai's orchestra of United States International University (USIU) in San Diego.
