= Prague Spring International Piano Competition =

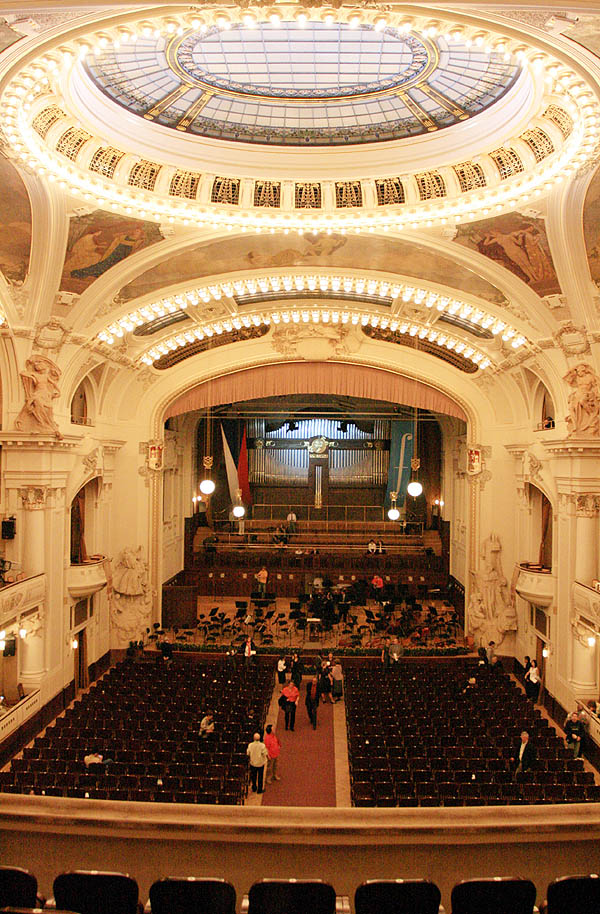
The Municipal Hall (Smetana Hall) in Prague, Czech Republic, serves as one of the main venues in the annual Prague Spring Festival and Competition.

The Prague Spring International Piano Competition is a music competition for young pianists that takes place in Prague, Czech Republic.

The competition is a member of the World Federation of International Music Competitions in Geneva. There have been eight editions of the competition since its inaugural session in 1948. The prize-giving ceremony takes place in the Brožík Room in the Old Town City Hall of Prague, with the mayor always traditionally attending. The competition's 9th edition took place in May 2011.

Since its first edition in 1948, the competition has discovered dozens of outstanding musicians for all over the world. Past piano laureates include Mindru Katz, Zdeněk Hnát, Pavel Štěpán, and Ivo Kahanek. Among the first laureates in other categories other than piano are the cellists Mstislav Rostropovich and Daniil Shafran, and the Smetana Quartet.

The Prague Spring Competition is now among the most widely recognized internationally, not only because it has discovered a respectable number of artists for the rest of the world (more past laureates include James Galway, Natalia Gutman, Natalia Shakhovskaya, Jan Panenka, Michel Becquet, Philippe Cuper, Dagmar Pecková, and Štefan Margita), but also because it was a founding member of the World Federation of International Music Competitions (WFIMC) in Geneva. Though the WFIMC is made up of hundreds of competition organizations, few of them hold a competition for several categories of instruments every year as Prague Spring Competition does.

The original prize included a cash award and an opportunity to perform in the closing concert of the Prague Spring Festival as soloist with the Czech Philharmonic Orchestra, but now also includes concert appearances in the following venues and festivals: Ticino Musica International Gathering of Young Musicians, International Festival Mitte Europa, EuroArt Praha International Music Festival, Young Prague International Music Festival, Young Stage Festival as part of the cycle Czech Culture Festivities, Treasures of Broumov Festival, and the Central European Festival of Concert Art in Žilina.

The competition also gives the opportunity of paid performances as part of the subscription series in the 2011–2012 season for winners of one of the main prizes with the following orchestras: Czech Chamber Music Society of the Czech Philharmonic, Brno Philharmonic Orchestra, Bohuslav Martinů Philharmonic Orchestra in Zlín, Hradec Králové Philharmonic Orchestra, Chamber Philharmonic Orchestra of South Bohemia in České Budějovice, Karlovy Vary Symphony Orchestra, Czech Chamber Philharmonic Orchestra in Pardubice, Moravian Philharmonic in Olomouc, Antonín Dvořák Memorial at Vysoká u Příbrami, Pilsen Philharmonic Orchestra, and North Czech Philharmonic Teplice.

The range of paid concert performances at international festivals and subscription series, which are offered to the laureates, is also broad. For competitors the chance to perform at the next Prague Spring Festival is also a major reason to enter the competition.

== History ==
The idea of organizing an international music competition as part of the famous Prague Spring Festival came from Rafael Kubelík and members of the Czech Philharmonic in 1946. That same year, the rules of the Jan Kubelík Violin Competition were drawn up, and the first competition was held in May 1947 as part of the Prague Spring. The honorary chairman of the competition was Jan Masaryk, the Minister of Foreign Affairs. The first piano competition was celebrated in 1948 and, until recently, it also carried the name of Bedřich Smetana Prize.

Members of the jury in the piano competition have included: Raoul Koczalski, Rudolf Firkusny, Lazar Berman, Lev Oborin, Pál Kadosa, Ilona Štěpánová-Kurzová, Guido Agosti, Eugene List, Pavel Štěpán, Jerzy Zurawlew, Jan Ekier, Jacques Février, Vera Gornostayeva, Jacob Lateiner, Josef Palenicek, Fanny Waterman, and Barbara Hesse-Bukowska.

== Winners ==
Complete list of winners

- 1st Edition - 1948 First Prize: Emi (Emmy) Béhar/Bernard Flavigny (tied)
- 2nd Edition - 1951 First Prize: Gleb Axelrod/Marina Slesaryeva (tied); Second Prize: Margarita Fjodorova (Fyodorova)
- 3rd Edition - 1957 First Prize: Anton Ginsburg/Zdenek Hnat/Alexei Skavronsky (tied)
- 4th Edition - 1963 First Prize: Roumiana Atanassova
- 5th Edition - 1973 First Prize: Valery Vishnevsky
- 6th Edition - 1988 First Prize: Sergey Tarasov
- 7th Edition - 1998 First Prize: Martin Kasik
- 8th Edition - 2004 First Prize: Ivo Kahanek
- 9th Edition - 2011 First Prize: not awarded
