= Antoni Sole =

Spanish filmmaker

Antoni Solé is a Spanish film & TV producer, showrunner, writer and director.

== Biography ==
He started his career as a film producer in 2001, some of his movies where in Competition in Cannes Film Festival, Berlin International Film Festival and Venezia. He wrote the script and direct the second unit in the action drama Alpha. directed by Joan Cutrina and produced by Genco Films and Zip Films in 2012. With the short movie thriller film You are a terrorist. made his director debut with a very controversial short film about media manipulation in the so-called "war against terrorism". In 2014 he wrote the script and direct the supernatural thriller Foe.

== Personal life ==
He is one of the most important collectors in the world of items related to Russian cellist Daniil Shafran.
