= 1. X. 1905 =

Piano composition by Leoš Janáček

- Piano sonata by Leoš Janáček
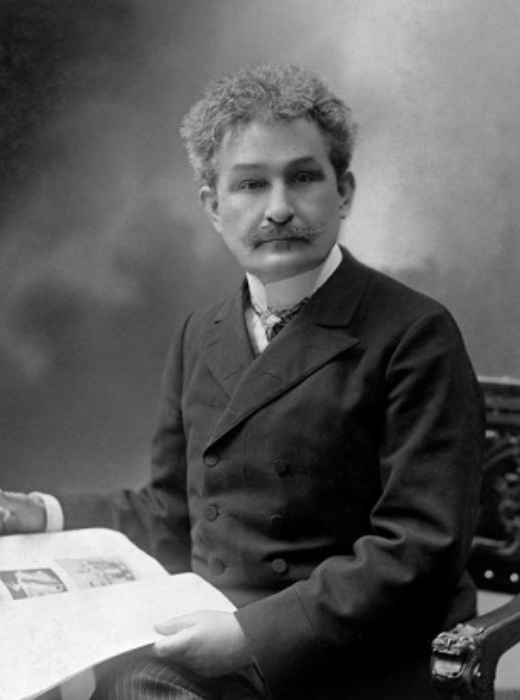
- Janáček in 1904
- Native name: Czech: Z ulice
- Other name: From the Street
- Key: E♭ minor
- Composed: 1905
- Performed: 27 January 1906: Brno
- Published: 1924
- Movements: 2

Complete performance by Eric Xi Xin Liang
I. Předtucha

II. Smrt

1. X. 1905, also known as Piano Sonata 1.X.1905, is a two-movement (originally three-movement) piano sonata in E♭ minor composed by Leoš Janáček in 1905. It is also known as From the Street.

== Background ==
Janáček intended the composition to be a tribute to a worker named František Pavlík (1885–1905), who on 1 October 1905 was bayoneted during demonstrations in support for a Czech university in Brno. In the work, Janáček expresses his disapproval of the violent death of the young carpenter. He started to compose it immediately after the incident occurred and finished its composition in January 1906. The première took place on 27 January 1906 in Brno (Friends of the Arts Club), with Ludmila Tučková at the piano.

Janáček also wrote a third movement, a funeral march, which he cut out and burned shortly before the first public performance of the piece in 1906. He was not satisfied with the rest of the composition either and later tossed the manuscript of the two remaining movements into the river Vltava. He later commented with regret about his impulsive action: "And it floated along on the water that day, like white swans". The composition remained lost until 1924 (the year of Janáček's seventieth birthday), when Tučková announced that she owned a copy. The second performance took place on 23 November 1924 in Prague, under the title 1. X. 1905. Janáček later accompanied the work with the following inscription:

The white marble of the steps of the Besední dům in Brno. The ordinary labourer František Pavlík falls, stained with blood. He came merely to champion higher learning and has been slain by cruel murderers.

The first authorized printed edition of the work was published in 1924 by the Hudební matice in Prague.

The Dutch composer Theo Verbey made an orchestral version of 1.X.1905, which premiered on 9 May 2008 in Utrecht, the Netherlands, with the Dutch Radio Filharmonisch Orkest conducted by Claus Peter Flor.

== Movements ==
The two movements in this sonata are:

1. Presentiment (Předtucha) – Con moto
2. Death (Smrt) – Adagio

== Recordings ==
- Leoš Janáček: Piano Works. Supraphon 1972. SU 3812-2 (Josef Páleníček)
- Leoš Janáček: Piano Works. Deutsche Grammophon 1972. 429 857–2 (Rudolf Firkušný)
- Leoš Janáček: Complete Piano Works. ArcoDiva. UP 0071–2132 (Jan Jiraský)
- Leoš Janáček: Piano Music Volume 1. Naxos (1996) N 8.553586 (Thomas Hlawatsch)
- Leoš Janáček: Sonata 1. X., In the Mist, On an Overgrown Path. Nonesuch (1983) 79041 (Ivan Moravec)
- Leoš Janáček: The Piano Works of Leoš Janáček. Helicon (1999) N 1204928 (Avner Arad)
- Leoš Janáček: Piano Sonata 1.X.1905, In the Mists, On the Overgrown Path, Series 1. EMI (2000) 724356183926 (Leif Ove Andsnes)
- Leoš Janáček: Piano Works (Complete). Brilliant Classics (2004) 92295 (Håkon Austbø)
- Chopin & Janáček: Piano Sonatas & Mussorgsky: Pictures at an Exhibition (Salzburg Festival 1957), Orfeo (2005), C633041B (Rudolf Firkušný)
- Leoš Janáček: Returning Paths: Solo Piano Works By Janáček and Suk. CAG (2014) 820360180828 (Ieva Jokubaviciute)
- Leoš Janáček: 'Piano Sonata 1.X.1905; On an Overgrown Path 1st & 2nd Series; In The Mist; A Recollection.' SommCD 028 – (Charles Owen)
- Haochen Zhang plays Schumann, Liszt, Janáček and Brahms. BIS (2017) BIS-2238 7318599922386 (Haochen Zhang)
