= Vilém Kurz =

Czech pianist (1872–1945)

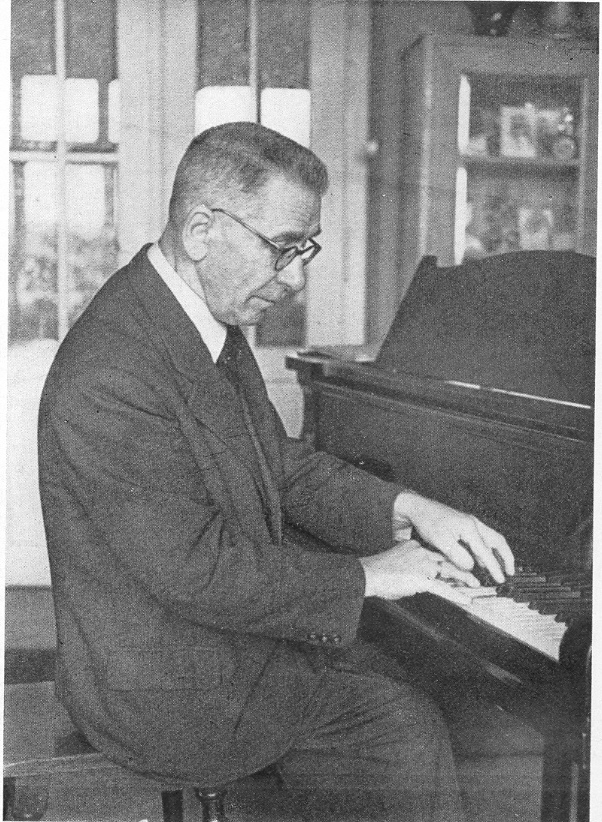
Vilém Kurz

Vilém Kurz (23 December 1872 – 25 May 1945) was a Czech pianist and piano teacher.

== Career ==
Kurz was born in Německý Brod, Bohemia on 23 December 1873. He became a professor at the State Conservatory in Lviv and Vienna, and Prague Conservatory.

His students included his daughter Ilona Štěpánová-Kurzová, Vasyl Barvinskiy, Rudolf Firkušný, Eduard Steuermann, Artur Rodziński, Břetislav Bakala, Pavel Štěpán, Stanislav Heller, František Maxián, Gideon Klein, Rafael Schächter, Stefania Turkewich, Ilja Hurník, and Pavel Šivic. (Note: See: List of music students by teacher: K to M#Vilém Kurz.)

His teaching methods were largely based on those of Theodor Leschetizky and his pupils he met during the time he taught in Lviv. Later they were further developed by his daughter, Ilona Štěpánová-Kurzová.

He died in Prague on 25 May 1945.

== Antonín Dvořák's Piano Concerto in G minor ==
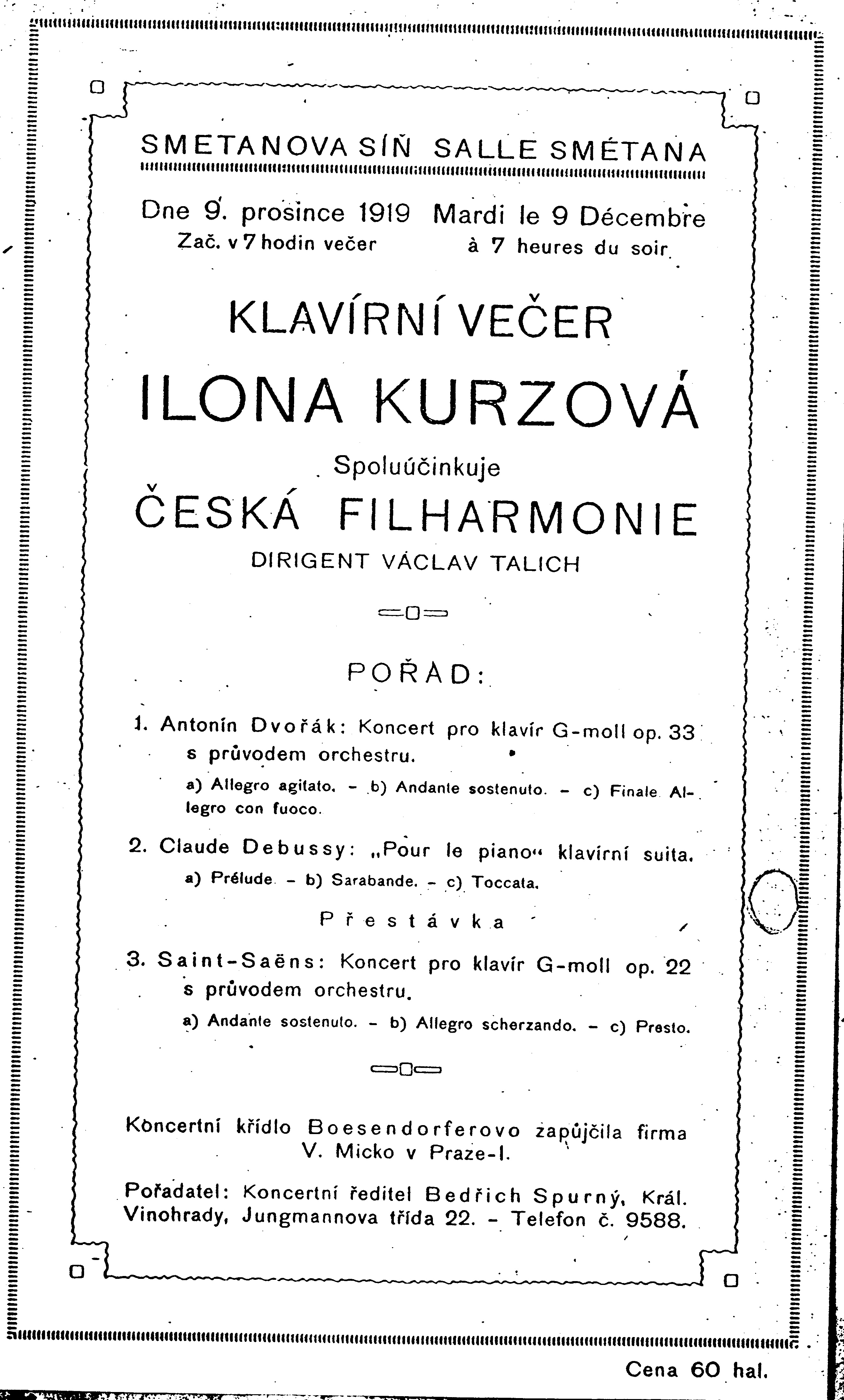
Premiere of Dvořák's Piano Concerto in G minor, Op. 33, reworked by Vilém Kurz, 9 December 1919, Ilona Kurzová, Czech Philharmonic Orchestra conducted by Václav Talich

Kurz is known for his reworking of the solo part of Antonín Dvořák's Piano Concerto in G minor, Op. 33, which was originally composed in 1876. For more than a decade after the concerto's first performance, it suffered from neglect and critical disdain.

In his 20s, Kurz undertook a revision of the solo part, and it is this version that he frequently performed. Since that time, the original and the Kurz versions have been printed together in Otakar Šourek's critical edition of the score, one beneath the other, so that the soloist can choose which version to perform. The Kurz version has become a part of the standard piano repertoire. Dvořák's original orchestral material is not affected by the soloist's choice.

In 1919, Ilona Kurzová played the first performance of the Kurz version of the concerto, conducted by Václav Talich. This revision was later adopted and recorded by Rudolf Firkušný, who in the 1950s also introduced a few cuts to the first and third movements. In the 1970s he abandoned all revisions in favour of the original version by Dvořák.

Supraphon, the Czech recording company, issued a compact disc on which Ivan Moravec plays the Kurz version, with the Czech Philharmonic conducted by Jiří Bělohlávek, while Radoslav Kvapil plays the composer's original score, with the Brno Philharmonic Orchestra under František Jílek.
