= Stanislav Heller =

Czech harpsichordist (1924–2000

- Born: 15 September 1924; Brno, Czechoslovakia
- Died: 23 January 2000 (aged 75); Jihlava, Czech Republic
- Occupation: Harpsichordist

Stanislav Heller (15 September 1924 – 23 January 2000) was a Czech harpsichordist and musicologist. After World War II, he lived and worked in the United Kingdom and Germany, and obtained British citizenship. After 1989, he returned to Czechoslovakia.

== Life and career ==
Heller was born in Brno, Czechoslovakia on 15 September 1924, to Stanislav Heller Sr., who was a lawyer in Brno, and Marie Hellerová. He studied piano with Vilém Kurz and organ with Bedřich Antonín Wiedermann at the Prague Conservatory. His family emigrated to Argentina after World War II. Stanislav Heller also spent a lot of time in South America and learned to speak Spanish fluently.

In 1947, he moved to London and later obtained British citizenship. He started a career as a concert harpsichordist there (one of the first concert harpsichordists in the 20th century) and also toured with Rafael Kubelík.

In the second half of the 1970s, Heller moved to Freiburg and worked as teacher of harpsichord at the Hochschule für Musik Freiburg. After the Velvet Revolution in 1989, he returned to Czechoslovakia and taught at the Janáček Academy of Performing Arts. He died on 23 January 2000 in Jihlava.
