= Ivan Moravec =

Czech concert pianist (1930–2015)

Ivan Moravec (9 November 1930 – 27 July 2015) was a Czech concert pianist whose performing and recording career spanned nearly half a century. Media and critics worldwide often called Moravec "a poet of the piano" or "pianist supreme". He is considered one of the greatest interpreters of Chopin.

== Life and career ==
Ivan Moravec was born in Prague. His first musical interest was in opera, which he attended as a child with his father. His father was an amateur pianist and singer, and helped his son sight-read and sing through the opera scores. Moravec later began piano studies with Erna Grünfeld (niece of the Austrian pianist Alfred Grünfeld). At twenty, he entered the Prague Conservatory, then went on to the Prague Academy of Arts, where he studied with Ilona Štěpánová-Kurzová, daughter of Vilém Kurz. In 1957, after hearing Moravec play in Prague, Arturo Benedetti Michelangeli invited him to attend master classes in Arezzo that summer.

In the late 1950s, an audio tape of a Prague recital was circulated in America. Soon afterwards, Connoisseur Society, a small American audiophile record company, negotiated with the Czech authorities to engage the young Moravec. In 1962 he traveled to New York to create the first of many recordings for that label, and in 1964 George Szell invited him to perform with the Cleveland Orchestra. Moravec's international concert career was launched.

Moravec performed major recital works by Chopin, Debussy, Beethoven, and Mozart, as well as Czech composers. He played with most of the world's notable symphony orchestras, and his active piano concerto repertoire included more than a dozen works by Mozart, Beethoven, Brahms, Schumann, Ravel, Prokofiev, and Franck. Moravec also taught music in Prague, and frequently gave master classes when on tour. In the 1984 film Amadeus about the life of Mozart, Moravec can be heard playing part of Mozart's Piano Concerto in E-flat.

Moravec had a reputation for attention to the condition of the pianos he played. He contended that this reputation was somewhat exaggerated, and named other pianists who traveled with a spare action or even their own pianos. Moravec's baggage was less extensive: a small black bag containing a few carefully chosen voicing tools. He comments, "I only try to meet with the technician, and I listen with him for any unevenness in sound. I do not find mechanical problems, because today the technicians in great cities are very knowledgeable, so mainly I listen to harsh notes, or to weak notes, and ask for these to be changed gently, and I try to put the local piano in the best condition."

Moravec died on 27 July 2015 in Prague at the age of 84.

== Awards and honors ==
- In 2010, the New York Times selected Moravec's 1965 recording of Chopin's Nocturnes as one of 5 representative works to showcase their celebration of the bicentenary of Chopin's birth.
- In 2000 Moravec was awarded the Charles IV Prize, the Czech Republic's most prestigious acknowledgement of service to humanity.
- In 2000 President Václav Havel presented Moravec with the Medal of Merit for outstanding artistic achievements.
- In 2002 Moravec was awarded the Cannes Classical Award for lifetime achievement.
- In 2004 Cannes Classical Awards
- In 1974 Wiener Flötenuhr – Preis der Mozartgemeinde Wien for the recording of Mozart’s Concerto for piano and orchestra
- In 1975 Wiener Flötenuhr – Preis der Mozartgemeinde Wien for the recording of Mozart’s Concerto No 25 in C major
- In 1976 American Stereo review´s Record of the year Award for the recording of Schumann’s Concerto for piano and orchestra in a minor

== Discography ==
Moravec's recordings for the Connoisseur Society are known for their audiophile quality, and nearly all of them remain available, following the LP era, on CD reissues.

Moravec also recorded for other labels, including Vox, Nonesuch, Dorian, Hänssler, and Supraphon. In 1998 a 2-CD compilation of Ivan Moravec recordings was published as part of the landmark Philips series, Great Pianists of the 20th Century consisting of Chopin mazurkas and other works, Franck's Prelude, choral et fugue, Books 1 and 2 of Debussy's Images and his Pour le piano, and Ravel's Sonatine. When classical music critics for the Times selected in 2010 on celebrate the bicentennial of Chopin's birth, they chose Moravec’s Nocturnes for its “extraordinary dynamic shading and gracious shaping of each gemlike work.”

Selected recordings include:

- Chopin: Nocturnes, vol. 1, Connoisseur Society (1966) (CS-1065). Reissue, Electra/Nonesuch (1991)
- Chopin: Nocturnes, vol. 2, Connoisseur Society (1966) (CS-1165). Reissue, Electra/Nonesuch (1991)
- Moravec plays Chopin, Connoisseur Society (1969) (CS-2019)
- Debussy: Preludes, Clair de lune, Children's Corner Suite, Connoisseur Society (1967)
- Piano Works—Debussy: Jardins sous la Pluie (Estampes), Suite, La Puerta del Vino, Ondine, Feuilles mortes, Ravel: Sonatine, Athena Records (1990) (ALSY-10002) (LP)
- Janáček: Sonata 1. X. 1905 and In the Mists (Hänssler, recorded 2000)
- Brahms: Piano Concerto No. 2 in B Flat Major (Supraphon, recorded 1990)
