= Ilona Štěpánová-Kurzová =

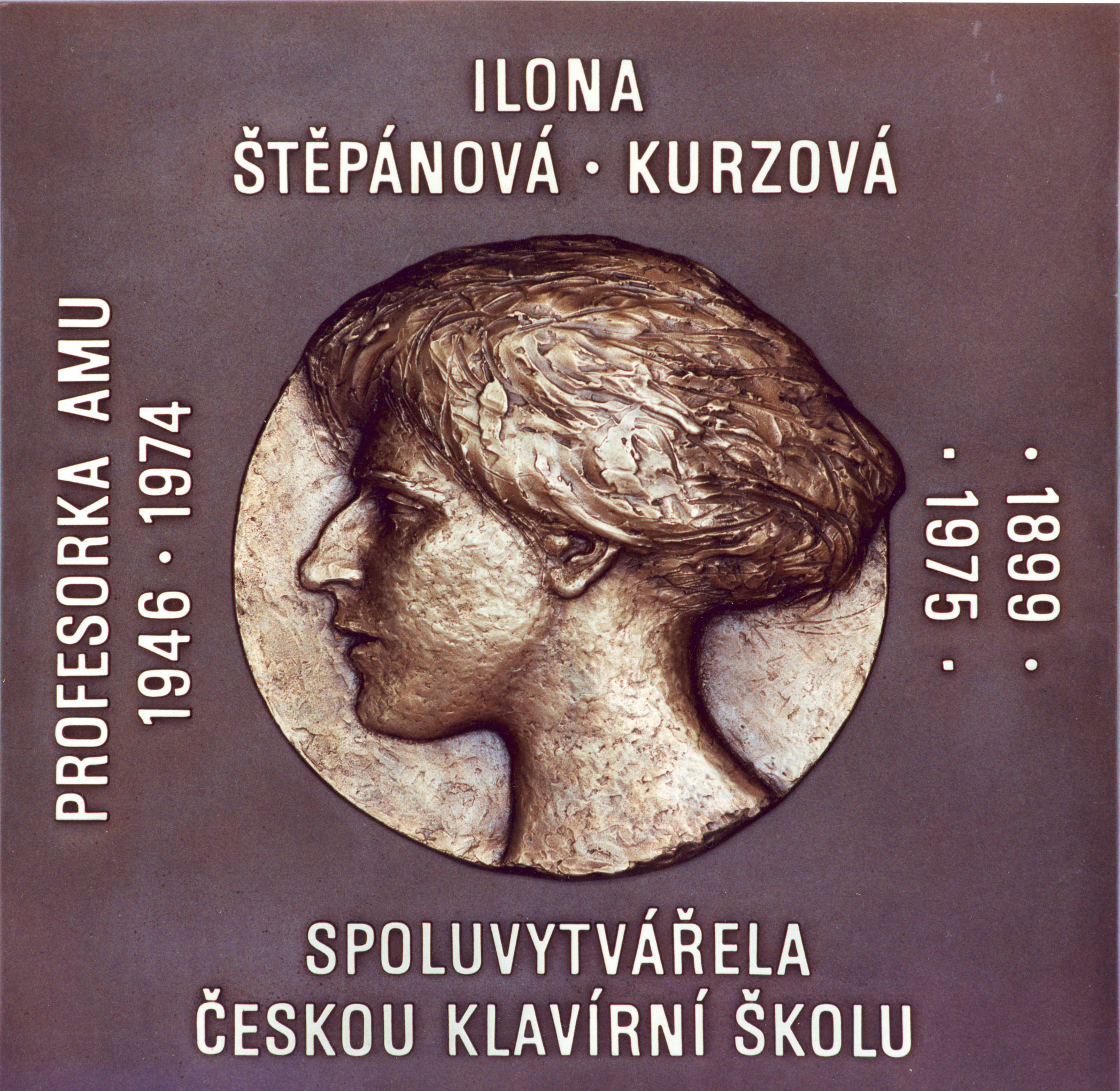

Ilona Štěpánová-Kurzová (19 November 1899 in Lviv – 25 September 1975 in Prague) was a Czechoslovak concert pianist and piano teacher, a professor at the Prague Academy of Arts. Her students included Ivan Moravec. Ilona Štěpánová-Kurzová was the mother of pianist Pavel Štěpán.

== Biography ==
Ilona Štěpánová-Kurzová belongs to notable representatives of the Czechoslovak piano school. To the public she is known as a popular teacher who prepared many interpreters during her life. Her concert career is omitted nowadays even though Ilona Štěpánová ranked herself among the best European artists of her time.

She was born as the only daughter in a family of excellent piano teachers Vilém Kurz and his wife Růžena. She was taught to play piano by her parents from a very young age. Her concert career started in Lviv, Ukraine at the age of ten with Mozart's "Coronation concert in D major" conducted by Oskar Nedbal and accompanied by the Viennese Tonkünstlerverein orchestra. This concert was repeated in Vienna and Prague.

=== Concert activity ===
Beginning in 1911 she developed extensive concert activity which lasted until the second half of the 1930s. Ilona Štěpánová inherited profession mastery to which she added her own personal contribution - deep inner experience and poetry. Summary of these qualities made her one of the most popular piano players of her time. She performed innumerable solo concerts, accompanied by notable orchestras and chamber ensembles (e. g. Czech, Ševčík's, Prague quartet etc.) in her country and abroad (performances in Poland, Germany, Austria, Holland). She included eleven piano concertos with orchestra and her general and extensive repertoire included principal works of world literature of all style periods (she was especially famous for her interpretation of Chopin's compositions).

Of Czechoslovak piano literature she played mostly Josef Suk, Vítězslav Novák, Bedřich Smetana, Antonín Dvořák, but also compositions of contemporary Czech authors (Karel Boleslav Jirák, Boleslav Vomáčka). She presented premieres of many compositions: e.g. in 1919 she played the first performance of Dvořák's Piano Concerto in G minor adapted by her father Vilém Kurz, conducted by Václav Talich; at Frankfurt am Main modern music festival in 1926 she performed the world premiere of Janáček's Concertino (Czech premiere - 16 February 1926); of the Russian literature she played Prokofiev's 3rd Piano Concerto in C major in Prague in 1926.

Marriage to outstanding Czechoslvak pianist, composer, teacher and musicologist Václav Štěpán (1924) meant another extension of public activities for the pianist. There is movement to contemporary music and many individual concerts from the two pianos literature.

=== Pedagogy ===
Ilona Štěpánová's teaching abilities were shown since her young age and it seemed to be just natural to turn her attention to this activity. As in her concert career she achieved outstanding success in this field. After her husband's death (1944) she took the lead of the master school of Prague Conservatory students. When Vilém Kurz died she took lead of his students as well.

She was professor at Academy of Music and Drama in Prague since 1946 (Ivan Moravec, Mirka Pokorná, Ilja Hurník, Anna Machová, Zdeněk Hnát, Dagmar Baloghová, Zorka Lochmanová-Zichová, Jaroslav Jiránek etc. were among her graduates). She fully concentrated on teaching for the rest of her life. Her son Pavel Štěpán became successor of family tradition. The pianist brought regard to composer's intention from Kurz school. This is shown in precise interpretation of the part and respecting composer's style, beautiful fine-sounding cantilena and brilliancy of technical performance. She enriched the Czech piano school by deep inner experience, colourfulness and plasticity of touch nuances. It enabled her complete loosening of entire playing apparatus combined with conscious fixing of some of its parts where certain kind of touch - according to character of the expected sound - demands this.

=== Publications ===
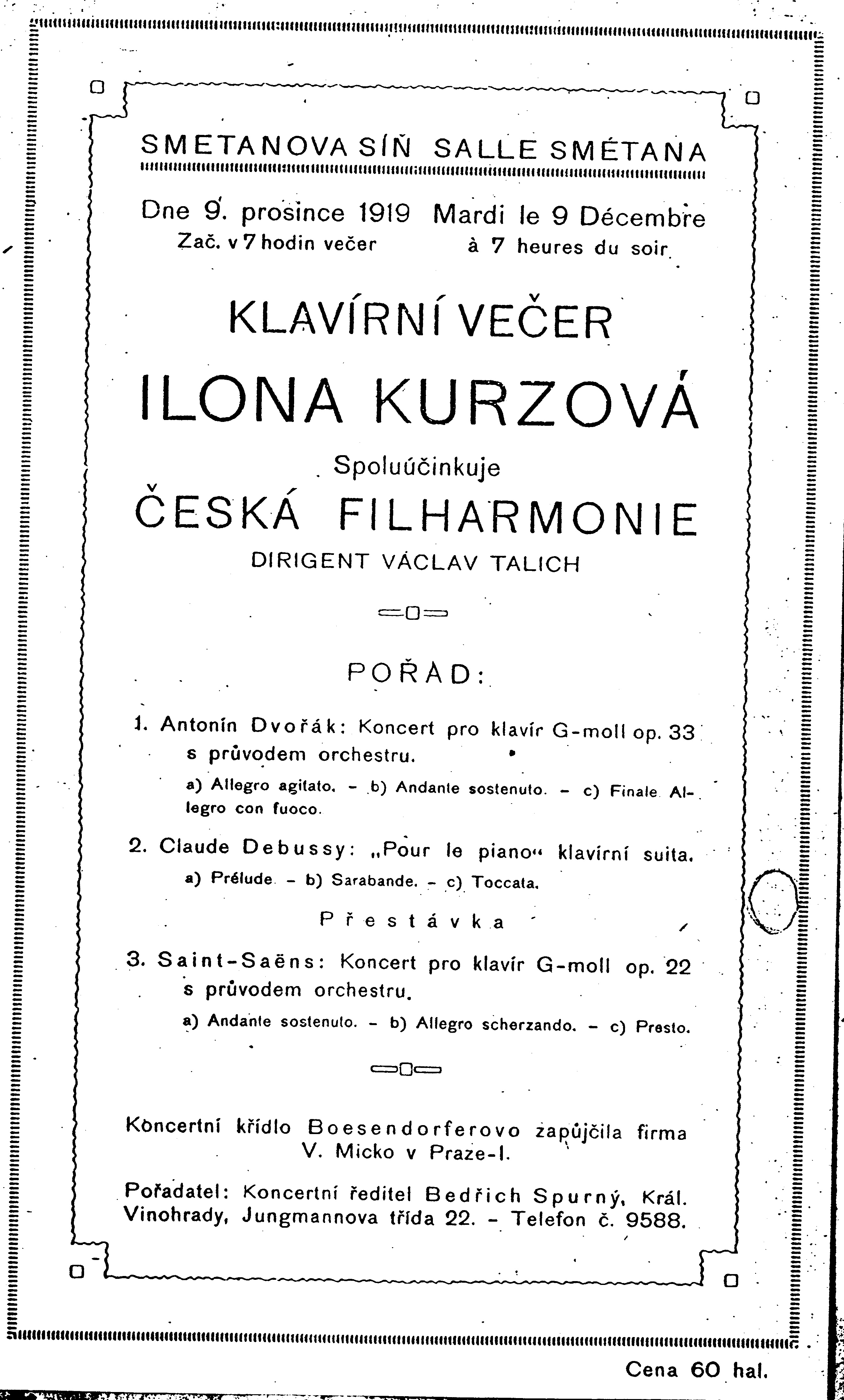
Premiere of Dvořák'sPiano Concerto in G minor op.33 remarked of Vilém Kurz 9 November 1919, Ilona Kurzová, Czech Philharmonic Orchestra conducted by Václav Talich

Technical studies anthology by Ilona Štěpánová "Piano technique" [Klavírní technika] (Prague 1979; new publications are being prepared) completed with methodical explanation which extends Kurz's "Technical fundamentals of piano play" [Technické základy klavírní hry] (Prague 1924) which it quotes in some parts. It analyses the smallest details of separate piano technique components. Each of eighteen series concentrates on one technical problem in progressively structured exercises. The development of piano play trend confirmed correctness of her opinion and comprehensive handbook was established, which professionals appreciate.
