= Sergey Tarasov (musician) =

Russian pianist

Sergey Tarasov is a Russian pianist. He was awarded 2nd prizes at the 1995 Ferruccio Busoni and Arthur Rubinstein competitions before winning the 1996 Sydney International Piano Competition. In 1988 he also won the 7th Prague Spring International Piano Competition. He subsequently obtained the 1998 International Tchaikovsky Competition's 4th prize and won the 1999 Premio Jaén.
