= Josef Bulva =

Czech pianist (1943–2020)

Josef Bulva (9 January 1943 – 12 August 2020) was a Czech pianist.

== Life ==
Bulva was born in Brno, Protectorate of Bohemia and Moravia, now the Czech Republic. He began his training aged nine at a music school in Napajedla and performed his first concerts aged 13, playing works by Mozart, études by Liszt and the Paganini Variations by Brahms. He was excused from conventional education and entered the Brno Conservatory with a state scholarship, before continuing on to the Music Academy of the Academy of Performing Arts in Bratislava (where he studied alongside Lucia Popp and Edita Gruberová), graduating with honors. Soon after, aged 21, he was named as an "artist of the State".

Bulva's subsequent intense international concert schedule was interrupted in 1971 for an entire year by a serious accident. He subsequently emigrated to the west for political reasons, taking residence first in Munich and then in Luxembourg, where he resumed his concert and recording activities.

In 1996 Bulva injured his left hand in another accident, with what was thought to be permanent damage, forcing him to end his career as a professional pianist. However, after an operation by Swiss hand surgeon Beat Simmen, Bulva regained full control of his hand and recommenced his career in November and December 2009, after a pause of 13 years, performing concerts in Augsburg, Munich, Zurich and Stuttgart. He died in Monaco.

Bulva's repertoire included works by Mozart, Beethoven, Brahms, Chopin, Liszt, Tchaikovsky, Prokofiev, Scriabin, Rachmaninov and contemporary composers. In some cases he has made his own arrangements of existing compositions, such as Liszt's "Hungarian Rhapsody No. 2" and Wagner's Tannhäuser Overture.

== Critical response ==
Bulva has occasionally divided opinion among critics. Music critic Joachim Kaiser once called him "the pianist of the scientific age" under whose hands "masterpieces appear in a new light", and the Steinway Owners' Magazine stated that "he mirrors much of the credo of Steinway & Sons". However, others have criticized his perceived analytic distance and lack of "romanticism", the latter especially with respect to his interpretation of the music of Chopin.

== Recordings ==
Bulva has recorded with labels such as Teldec, RCA, Orfeo and Mediaphon-Madacy, some of which are still available. These include:

- "Piano Recital" with compositions by Beethoven and Chopin, live recording on CEPA/Radio 100.7 FM
- Beethoven: Piano Sonata No. 21 ("Waldstein") on Orfeo
- Beethoven: Piano Sonata No. 23 in F minor, Op. 57 ("Appassionata") on Orfeo
- Liszt: Transcendental Études on Orfeo
- Prokofiev: Romeo and Juliet, Op. 75 (piano version) on Teldec

Later, the Oreikon label published The Art of Josef Bulva, a seven-CD authorized collection of Bulva's work. The main works on this edition are:

- Beethoven: Piano Concerto No. 5 in E flat major, Op. 73 ("Emperor")
- Beethoven: Piano Sonata No. 13 in E flat major, Op. 27 No. 1
- Beethoven: Piano Sonata No. 14 in C sharp minor, Op. 27 No. 2 ("Moonlight")
- Beethoven: Piano Sonata No. 23 in F minor, Op. 57 ("Appassionata")
- Brahms: Piano Concerto No. 2 in B flat major, Op. 83
- Chopin: Ballade No. 1 in G minor, Op. 23
- Chopin: Scherzo No. 2 in B flat minor, Op. 31
- Chopin: Polonaise No. 3 in A major, Op. 40 No. 1 ("Military Polonaise")
- Chopin: Polonaise No. 5 in F-sharp minor, Op. 44
- Liszt: Piano Concerto No. 1 in E flat major
- Liszt: Piano Concerto No. 2 in A major
- Liszt: Piano Sonata in B minor
- Liszt: Hungarian Rhapsody No. 2 in C sharp minor
- Liszt: Grandes études de Paganini No. 3 in G sharp minor ("La Campanella")
- Liszt: Rhapsodie Espagnole
- Mozart: Piano Sonata No. 17 in B flat major, K 570
- Rachmaninov: Rhapsody on a Theme of Paganini, Op. 43
- Scriabin: Piano Sonata No. 3 in F sharp minor, Op. 23
- Tchaikovsky: Piano Concerto No. 1 in B flat minor, Op. 23
