= Piano Concerto (Dvořák) =

1876 piano concerto by Antonín Dvořák

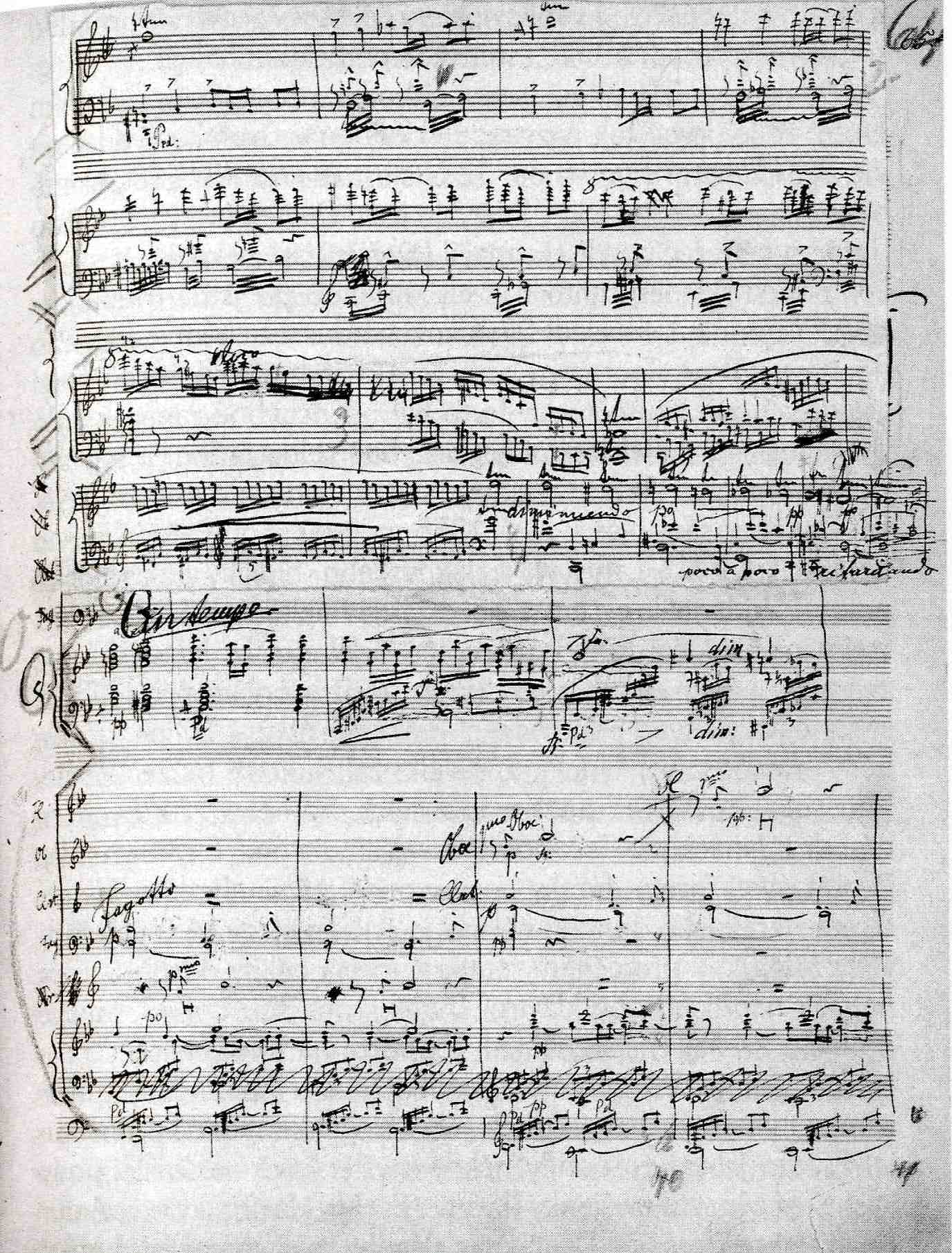
Page from Dvořák's Piano Concerto in G minor, Op. 33

The Concerto for Piano and Orchestra in G minor, Op. 33, is the only piano concerto by Czech composer Antonín Dvořák. Written in 1876, it was the first of three concertos that Dvořák completed, followed by the Violin Concerto, Op. 53 from 1879 and the Cello Concerto, Op. 104, written in 1894–1895. The piano concerto is the least known and least performed of Dvořák's concertos.

As the music critic Harold C. Schonberg put it, Dvořák wrote "an attractive Piano Concerto in G minor with a rather ineffective piano part, a beautiful Violin Concerto in A minor, and a supreme Cello Concerto in B minor".

== Background ==
Dvořák composed his piano concerto from late August through 14 September 1876. Its autograph version contains many corrections, erasures, cuts and additions, the bulk of which were made in the piano part. The work was premiered in Prague on 24 March 1878, with the orchestra of the Prague Provisional Theatre conducted by Adolf Čech with the pianist Karel Slavkovský. The first performance in England was with soloist Oscar Beringer at the Crystal Palace on October 13 1883.

While working on the concerto, Dvořák himself realized that he had not created a virtuosic piece in which the piano does battle with the orchestra. Dvořák wrote: "I see I am unable to write a Concerto for a virtuoso; I must think of other things." What Dvořák composed instead was a symphonic concerto in which the piano plays a leading part in the orchestra, rather than opposed to it.

In an effort to mitigate awkward passages and expand the pianist's range of sonorities, the Czech pianist and pedagogue Vilém Kurz undertook an extensive rewriting of the solo part; the Kurz revision is frequently performed today.

The concerto was championed for many years by the noted Czech pianist Rudolf Firkušný, who played it with many different conductors and orchestras around the world before his death in 1994. Once a student of Kurz, Firkušný performed the revised solo part for much of his life, turning towards the original Dvořák score later on in his concert career.

In discussing the piano music of Franz Liszt, the pianist Leslie Howard, who has recorded all of it, notes: "... there is nothing in Liszt that is anywhere near as difficult to play as the Dvořák Piano Concerto - a magnificent piece of music, but one of the most ungainly bits of piano writing ever printed".

== Form ==
The concerto is scored for solo piano and an orchestra consisting of 2 flutes, 2 oboes, 2 clarinets, 2 bassoons, 2 horns, 2 trumpets, timpani, and strings. It has three movements:

1. Allegro agitato (about 18 minutes)
2. Andante sostenuto, in D major (about 9 minutes)
3. Allegro con fuoco, in G minor → G major (about 11 minutes)

A typical performance of the work lasts 38–40 minutes.

== Performance history ==
Performances of Dvořák's Piano Concerto.

- Prague, Austria-Hungary: 24 March 1878, conducted by Adolf Čech, played by Karel Slavkovský
- London, Great Britain: 13 October 1883, conducted by August Manns, played by Oscar Beringer
- Prague, Austria-Hungary: 4 January 1884, conducted by Adolf Čech, played by Ella Modřická
- Prague, Austria-Hungary: 26 March 1884, conducted by Adolf Čech, played by Ella Modřická
- Berlin, German Empire: 21 November 1884, conducted by Dvořák himself, played by Anna Groser
- London, Great Britain: 6 May 1885, conducted by Dvořák himself, played by Franz Rummel
- Prague, Austria-Hungary: 12 March 1898, conducted by Oskar Nedbal, played by Josef Růžička

== Selected discography ==
- Sviatoslav Richter: Dvořák's Piano Concerto & Schubert's "Wanderer" Fantasy. Bavarian State Orchestra conducted by Carlos Kleiber. EMI Great Recordings of the Century (catalog no. 66947)
- Radoslav Kvapil: Dvořák: Piano Concerto, Op.33. Czech State Philharmonic Orchestra (Brno) conducted by František Jilek. Supraphon, 1996.
- Rustem Hayroudinoff: with the BBC Philharmonic conducted by Gianandrea Noseda. (Chandos Records catalogue no. CHAN 10309); Also on this CD is the Violin Concerto performed by James Ehnes
- Ivo Kahánek: Dvořák & Martinů: Piano Concertos. Bamberg Symphony conducted by Jakub Hrůša. (Supraphon SU 4236-5). On this CD with the Piano concerto No. 4 by Bohuslav Martinů. 2020 BBC Music Magazine Awards winning recording in category Concerto Award.
