= Orfeo (record label) =

German record label

Orfeo International Music
- Parent company: Naxos
- Founded: 1979
- Founder: Axel Mehrle
- Genre: Classical
- Country of origin: Germany

Orfeo Classic Schallplatten und Musikfilm GmbH of Munich was a German independent classical record label founded in 1979 by Axel Mehrle and launched in 1980. It has been owned by Naxos since 2015.

== History ==
The Orfeo music label was registered by F. Axel Mehrle on 12 December 1979 as Orfeo Classic Records and Music Film GmbH. Orfeo introduced a new financial model for the music industry that made all investments in the label tax-deductible.

All of Orfeo's masters were digital, pressed using Direct Metal Mastering, distributed as CDs starting in 1983, and featuring a striking navy blue border on all covers.

In 1981, some of Orfeo's records were released and distributed by EMI and RCA through a five-year partnership deal. From 1981 to 1984, the label's yearly revenue grew from $100,000 to $2 million.

In 1985, as the company faced severe financial difficulties, the label's name was changed to Oro, and the company filed for bankruptcy. In May 1985, Frank Mehrle licensed all of Orfeo's master rights to his associate Dieter Sinn (120 releases). Dieter Sinn created a new company, Orfeo International, to further the sales of the releases. Orfeo International hired many of Orfeo's employees and took over all of the bankrupt label's international contracts.

Despite having a strong catalogue of artists from the start, the costs of operations were excessive, and the label was burdened by additional funding efforts that ruined its finances and derailed its promising launch. In December 1985, F. Axel Mehrle was charged with fraud and embezzlement in connection with Orfeo's bankruptcy, and a warrant for his arrest was issued.

In 2017, qobuz.com released some of the records online.

== Releases ==
It has released many classical own productions with artists as Carlos Kleiber, Wolfgang Sawallisch, Rafael Kubelik, Colin Davis, Bernard Haitink, Kurt Eichhorn, Christian Thielemann, Andris Nelsons, Dietrich Fischer-Dieskau (both as singer and conductor), Jessye Norman, Julia Varady, Margaret Price, Lucia Popp, Diana Damrau, Edita Gruberova, Grace Bumbry, Brigitte Fassbaender, Agnes Baltsa, Carlo Bergonzi, Peter Schreier, Piotr Beczala, Renato Bruson, Bernd Weikl, Kurt Moll, Dmitry Sitkovetsky, Géza Anda, Josef Bulva, Oleg Maisenberg, Mischa Maisky, Julius Berger, Karl Leister, Aurèle Nicolet etc.

Orfeo owns a well-known sub-label "ORFEO D'OR", publishing legendary live performances from the archives of the Salzburg Festival, the Bayreuth Festival, the Bavarian State Opera, the Vienna State Opera, the Bavarian Radio Symphony Orchestra etc. Further, it has produced two records with the late Heinz Ruehmann.

== See also ==
- List of record labels
