= Leoš Firkušný =

Czech musicologist

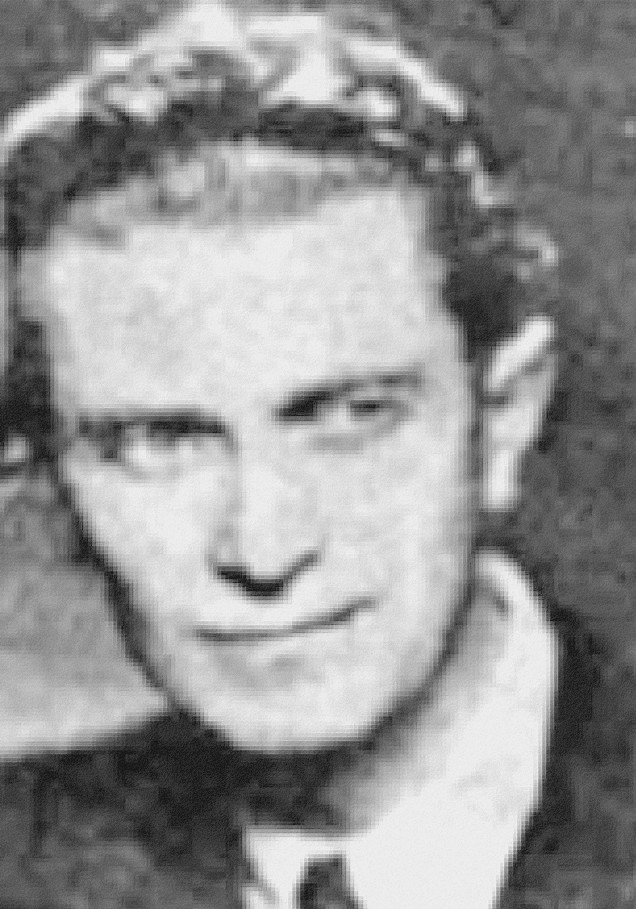
Leoš Firkušný (1905-1950)

Leoš Firkušný (16 July 1905 – 9 July 1950) was a Czech musicologist.

== Life ==
Firkušný was born on 16 July 1905 in Napajedla, Moravia, Austria-Hungary. He was an older brother of the pianist Rudolf Firkušný, and their sister Marie Kasiková (born Firkušná). He was an expert on Leoš Janáček and did much to bring his music to the listeners abroad. He was one of the founders of the music festival Prague Spring. He died on 9 July 1950 in Buenos Aires, Argentina.
