= Vincenc Prasek =

Czech historian and educator

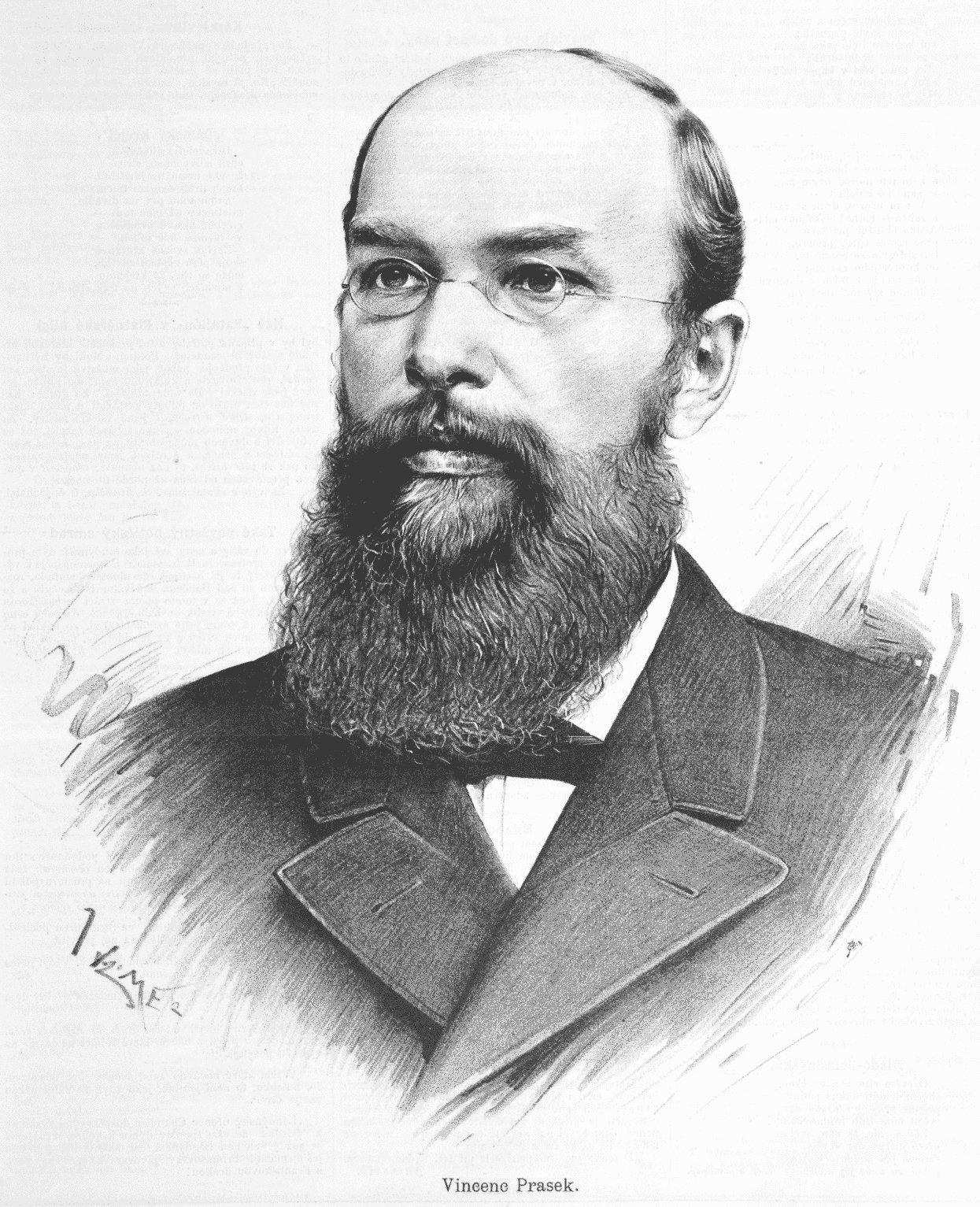
- Vincenc Prasek (1889)
- Born: 9 April 1843; Milostovice, Austrian Silesia
- Died: 31 December 1912 (aged 69); Napajedla, Moravia
- Citizenship: Austrian
- Occupations: Educator, linguist, historian

Vincenc Prasek (9 April 1843 in Milostovice – 31 December 1912 in Napajedla) was a Czech educator, linguist and historian active in the region of Silesia. He contributed to several Czech periodicals based in Opava and in 1883–1895 served as the first principal of the Czech grammar school (gymnasium) there.

In 1863–1868 Prasek studied classical philology and slavistics at the University of Vienna. He also spent one semester at the University of Breslau. He began his teaching career in 1868 in Olomouc at the Czech gymnasium. Prasek was active in several school organizations. As a writer, Prasek focused mainly on publishing works about political history, ethnography and historical geography of Moravia and Silesia. In 1902–1909, he edited magazine Selský archiv (Peasants' Archive), which focused on general and cultural history of peasants in Moravia and Silesia. He also published several linguistic works.

== Works ==
- Brus příspěvečkem ku skladbě srovnávací (1873)
- Podání lidu (1888)
- Historická topografie země Opavské. A–K (1889)
- Dějiny kraje Holasovského čili Opavského (1891)
- Dějiny knížetství Těšínského (1894)
