= Napajedla =

- Town
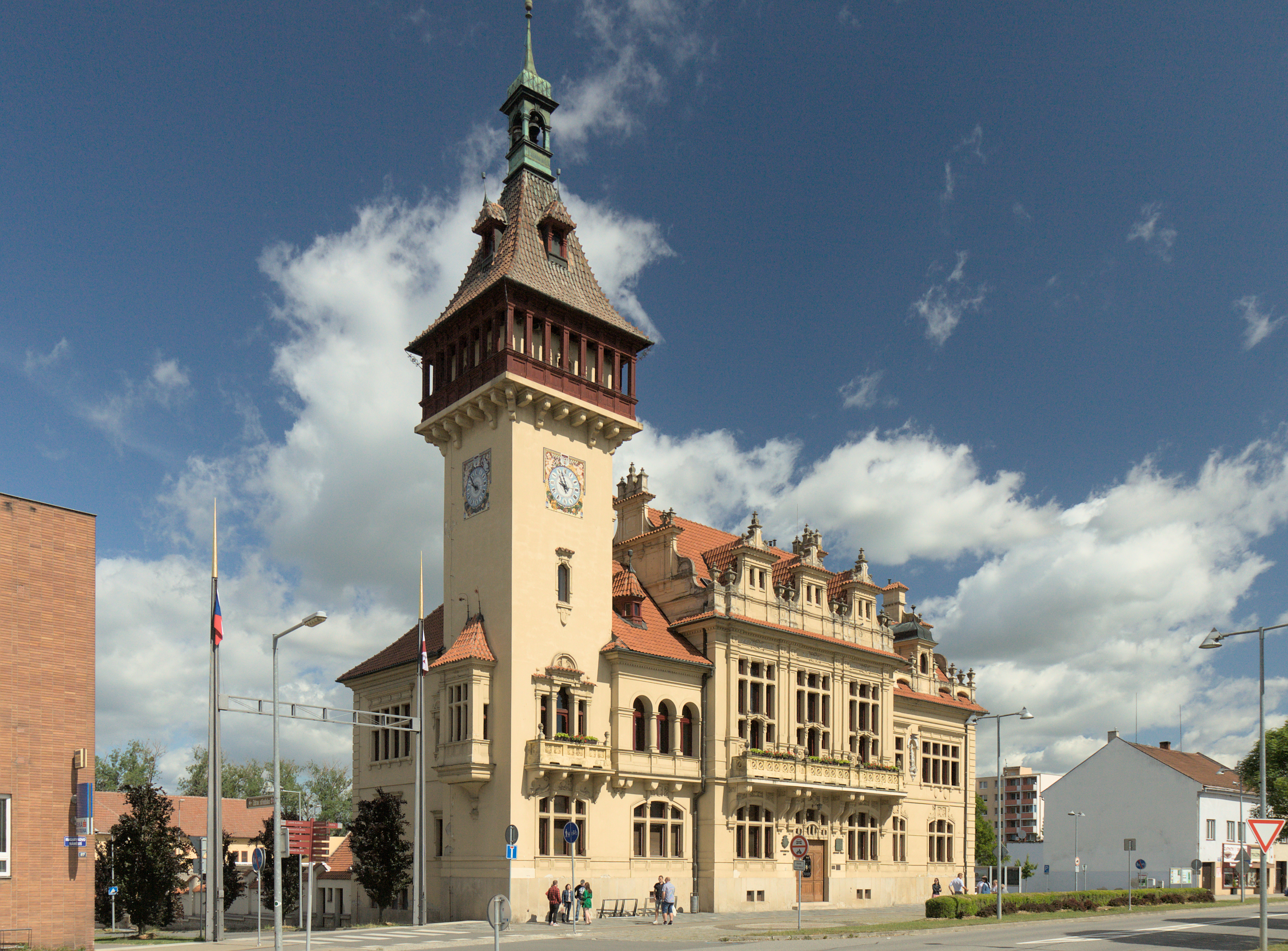
- Town hall

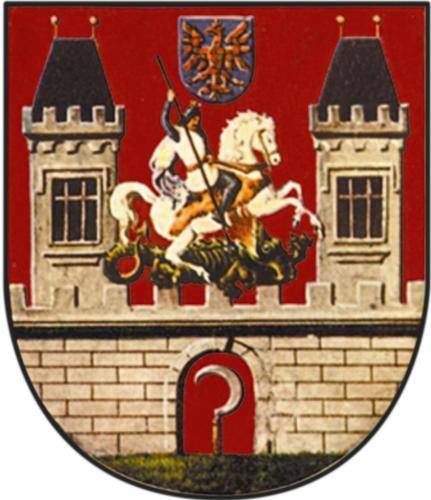
- Flag Coat of arms

- Location in the Czech Republic
- Coordinates: 49°10′18″N 17°30′43″E
- Country: Czech Republic
- Region: Zlín
- District: Zlín
- First mentioned: 1355

Government
  - Mayor: Jiří Čižmař (ANO)

Area
  - Total: 19.83 km^{2} (7.66 sq mi)
- Elevation: 200 m (660 ft)

Population (2026-01-01)
  - Total: 6,981
  - Density: 352.0/km^{2} (911.8/sq mi)
- Time zone: UTC+1 (CET)
  - Summer (DST): UTC+2 (CEST)
- Postal code: 763 61
- Website: www.napajedla.cz

Napajedla (Czech pronunciation: [ˈnapajɛdla]; German: Napajedl) is a town in the Zlín Region of the Czech Republic. It has about 7,000 inhabitants. The town is situated on the Morava River. The historic town centre is well preserved and is protected as an urban monument zone.

== Etymology ==
The town's name is derived from the verb napojit, which means 'to water (horses)'. It refers to a ford, which was used by military caravans for stops and refreshments. The word napajedla literally means 'watering holes' in Czech.

== Geography ==
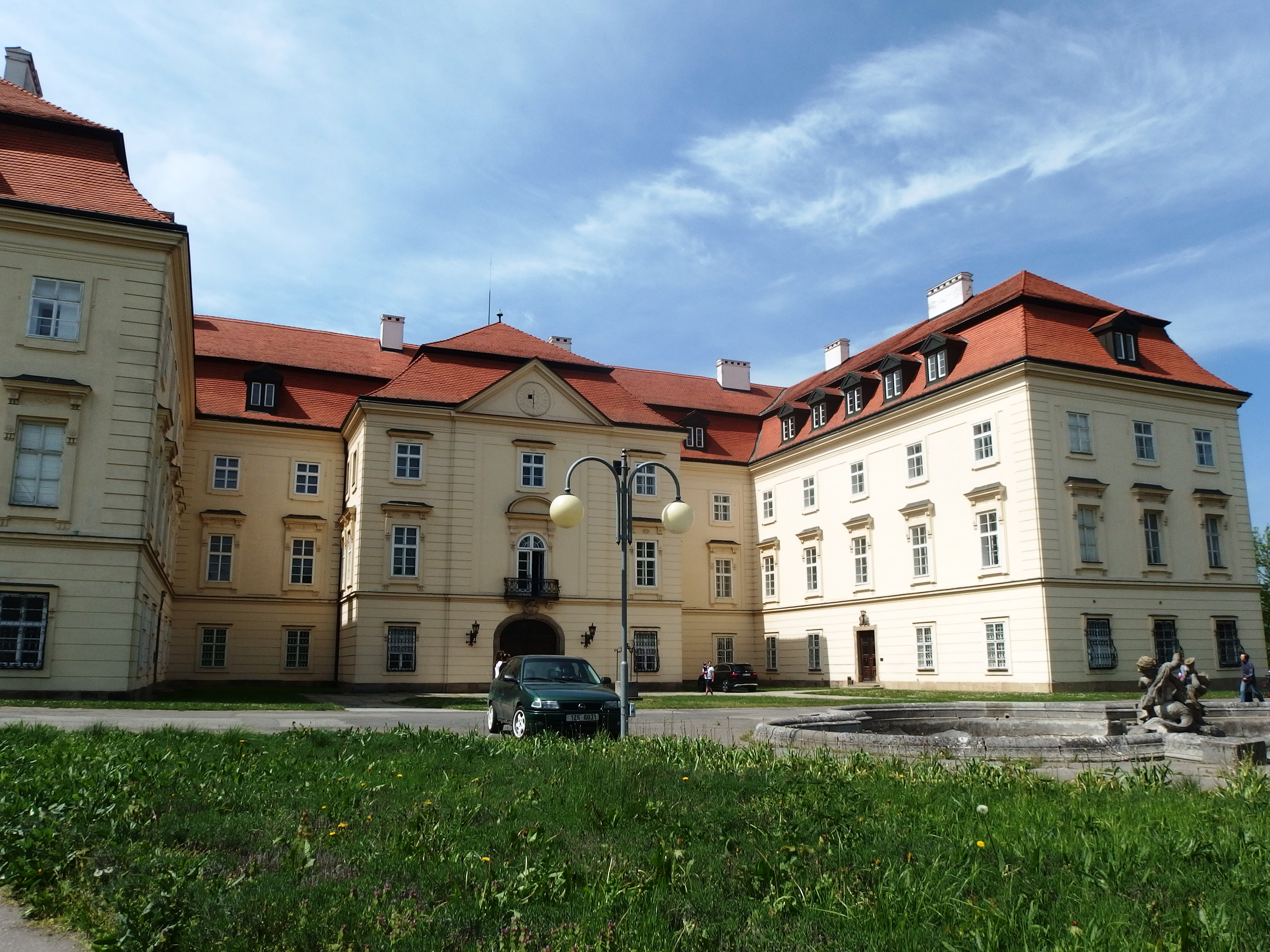
Napajedla Castle

Napajedla is located about 7 kilometres (4 mi) southwest of Zlín. It forms a conurbation with the neighbouring town of Otrokovice. Most of the municipal territory lies in the Vizovice Highlands, but the area on the right bank of the Morava extends into the Chřiby range. The highest point is the hill Maková at 338 m (1,109 ft) above sea level. The Morava River flows through the town.

== History ==
The first written mention of Napajedla is from 1355. In the 14th century, the settlement became a market town. For a long time, it was owned by the Zierotin family. The next important owner was the Rottal family. During their rule, the estate grew significantly and they had built the Church of Saint Bartholomew.

The Napajedla estate achieved its greatest fame under the Lords of Stockau. The sulfur spa with a healing mineral water was established and Napajedla became a much-visited town. The existence of the mineral springs was first mentioned in documents from the 16th century. The springs were severely damaged when the railway was built in the mid-19th century, and only one spring persisted. The spa was closed in the mid-20th century.

Napajedla was promoted to a town in 1898.

== Demographics ==
Historical population

Year	Pop.	±%
1869	3,041	—
1880	3,404	+11.9%
1890	3,601	+5.8%
1900	3,769	+4.7%
1910	3,793	+0.6%

Year	Pop.	±%
1921	3,600	−5.1%
1930	3,922	+8.9%
1950	4,848	+23.6%
1961	5,463	+12.7%
1970	5,790	+6.0%

Year	Pop.	±%
1980	7,747	+33.8%
1991	7,784	+0.5%
2001	7,607	−2.3%
2011	7,246	−4.7%
2021	6,928	−4.4%

Source: Censuses

== Transport ==
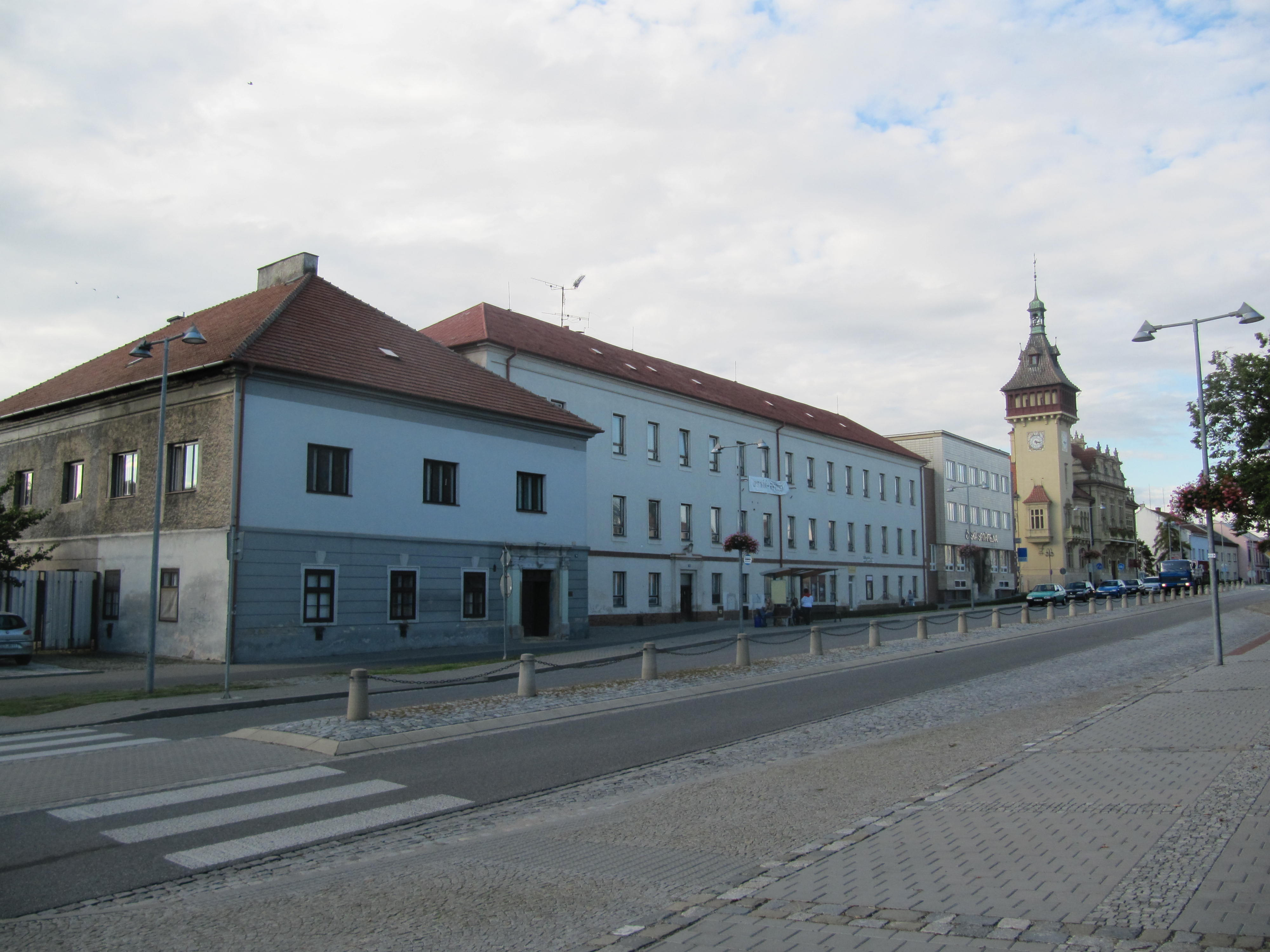
The square Masarykovo náměstí with part of the Old Castle

The D55 motorway, which further continues as the I/55 road, runs next the town.

== Culture ==
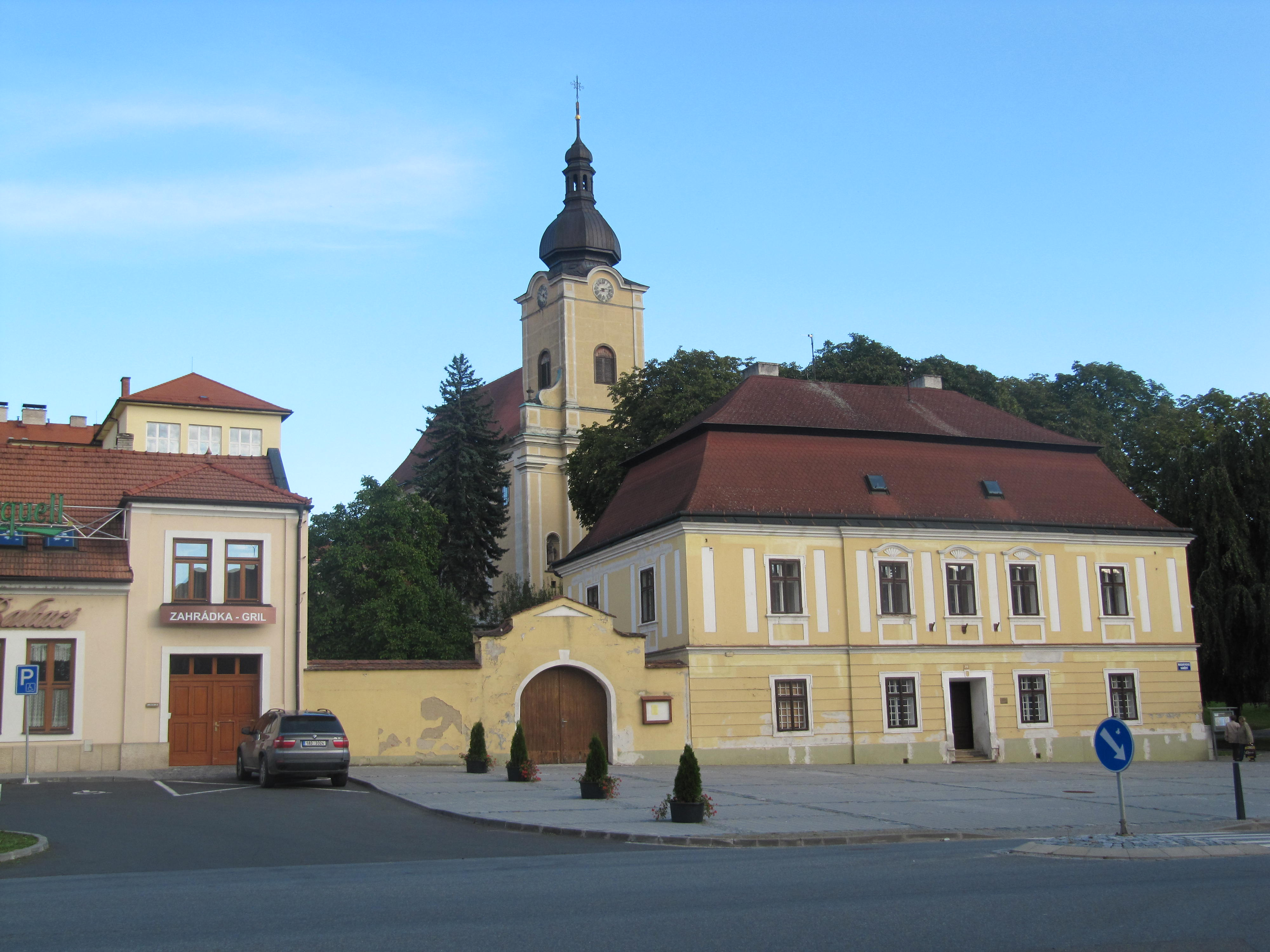
Rectory and Church of Saint Bartholomew

Napajedla is located on the tripoint of the cultural and ethnographic regions of Moravian Wallachia, Moravian Slovakia and Haná. The town hosts an annual meeting of folk ensembles called Moravské chodníčky. Folklore ensembles Radovan and Radovánek with long history are based in the town.

Other annual cultural events are St. Wenceslaus Celebrations and Theatre Festival of Amateur Ensembles.

== Sights ==
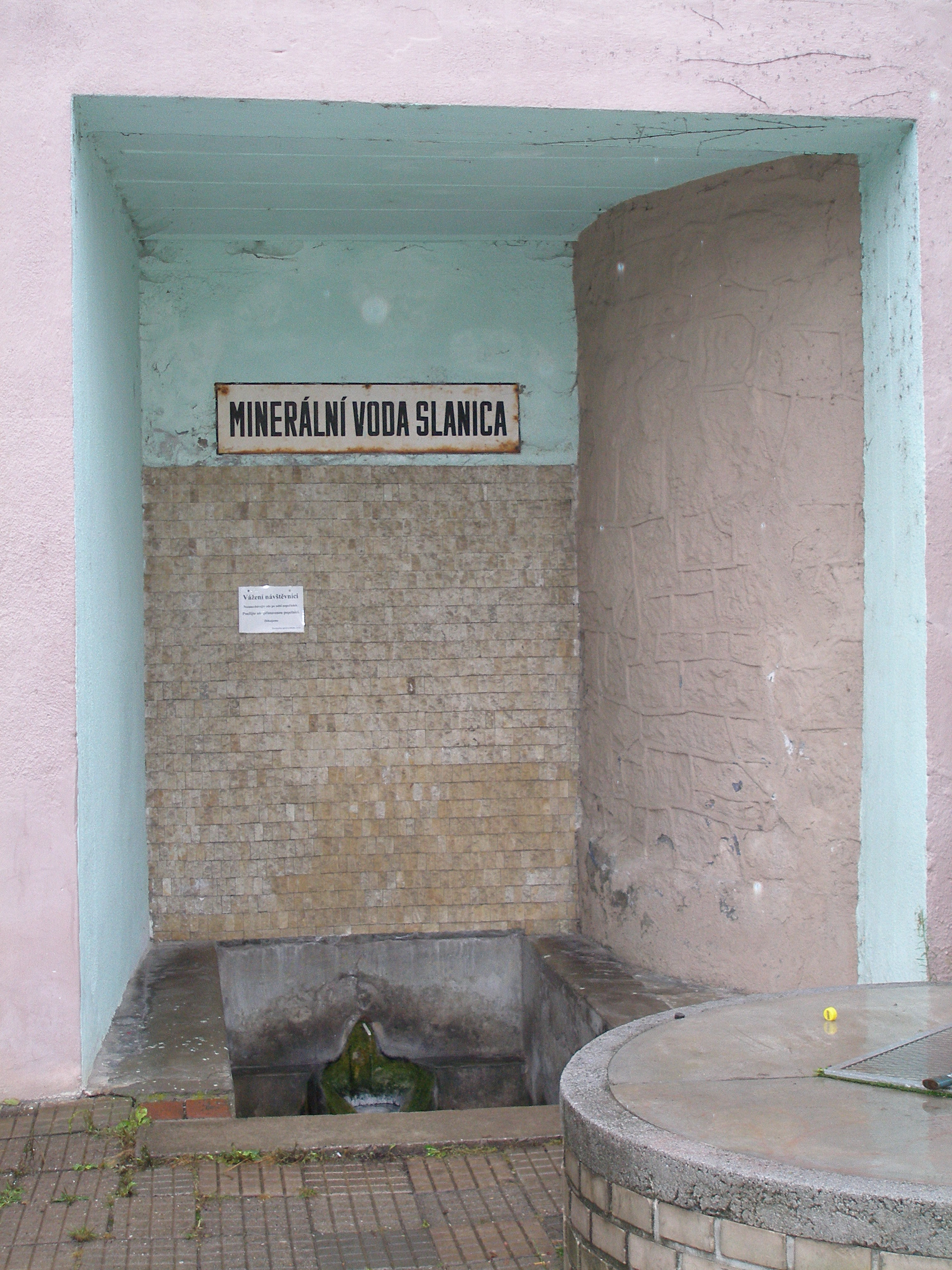
Slanica mineral spring

The pseudo-Renaissance town hall was built in 1898 to celebrate the promotion of Napajedla to a town. It was decorated by František Uprka and Jano Köhler.

The Napajedla Castle was built in the mid-18th century. It is surrounded by a 10 ha (25 acres) large English park. Today it serves as a hotel.

The Old Castle dates from the mid-17th century. It served as an aristocratic residence until the construction of the Napajedla Castle. Today it is also privately owned and used as a hotel.

An important monument is the stud farm, founded in 1886 by the then owner of the estate Aristide Baltazzi. In a large area, in addition to English-style stables, there are also paddocks with horses and the so-called rotunda with the burial ground of the most famous stallions. The tradition of breeding thoroughbred here lasted until 2023.

The Church of Saint Bartholomew was built in 1710–1712. It replaced an older church with insufficient capacity.

There is a mineral spring called Slanica (from slaný, i.e. 'salty') in the town. It is the only one of the original springs that persisted.

== Notable people ==
- Vincenc Prasek (1843–1912), historian, linguist; lived here
- Božena Benešová (1873–1936), poet and writer; grew up here
- Josef Šnejdárek (1875–1945), army general
- Leoš Firkušný (1905–1950), musicologist
- Rudolf Firkušný (1912–1994), pianist
- Zdeněk Řihák (1924–2006), architect
- Josef Bulva (1943–2020), pianist; studied here

== Twin towns – sister cities ==
Napajedla is twinned with:

- Borský Mikuláš, Slovakia
- Kľak, Slovakia
- Ostrý Grúň, Slovakia
