= Zdeněk Hnát =

Czech pianist

Zdeněk Hnát (born 25 October 1935) is a Czech classical pianist, known especially for his interpretations of Czech music and chamber music.

Hnat was born in Liberec, Czech Republic. He studied piano with Ilona Štěpánová-Kurzová in Prague, and Heinrich Neuhaus (the latter at the Moscow Conservatory). He won numerous prizes, including First Prize at the Prague Spring Competition in 1957.

He has made many broadcast and LP recordings, most of which have not yet been reissued on CD. The most celebrated records were those of Beethoven Hammerclavier Sonata, music by Prokofiev, Scriabin, works by Czech composers and chamber works. He appeared on stage in many important venues all around the world. Throughout his whole artistic career, he both performed and taught. He first taught at the Prague Conservatory and later at the Janáček Academy of Music, for a long time also as a headmaster of the Piano Department. He also appeared as a member of faculty at the "International Kubalek Piano Courses".

In 2006 he announced his retirement from the pedagogical life for health reasons, but continues performing giving recitals in Prague and other cities of his homeland.
