= Pavel Štěpán =

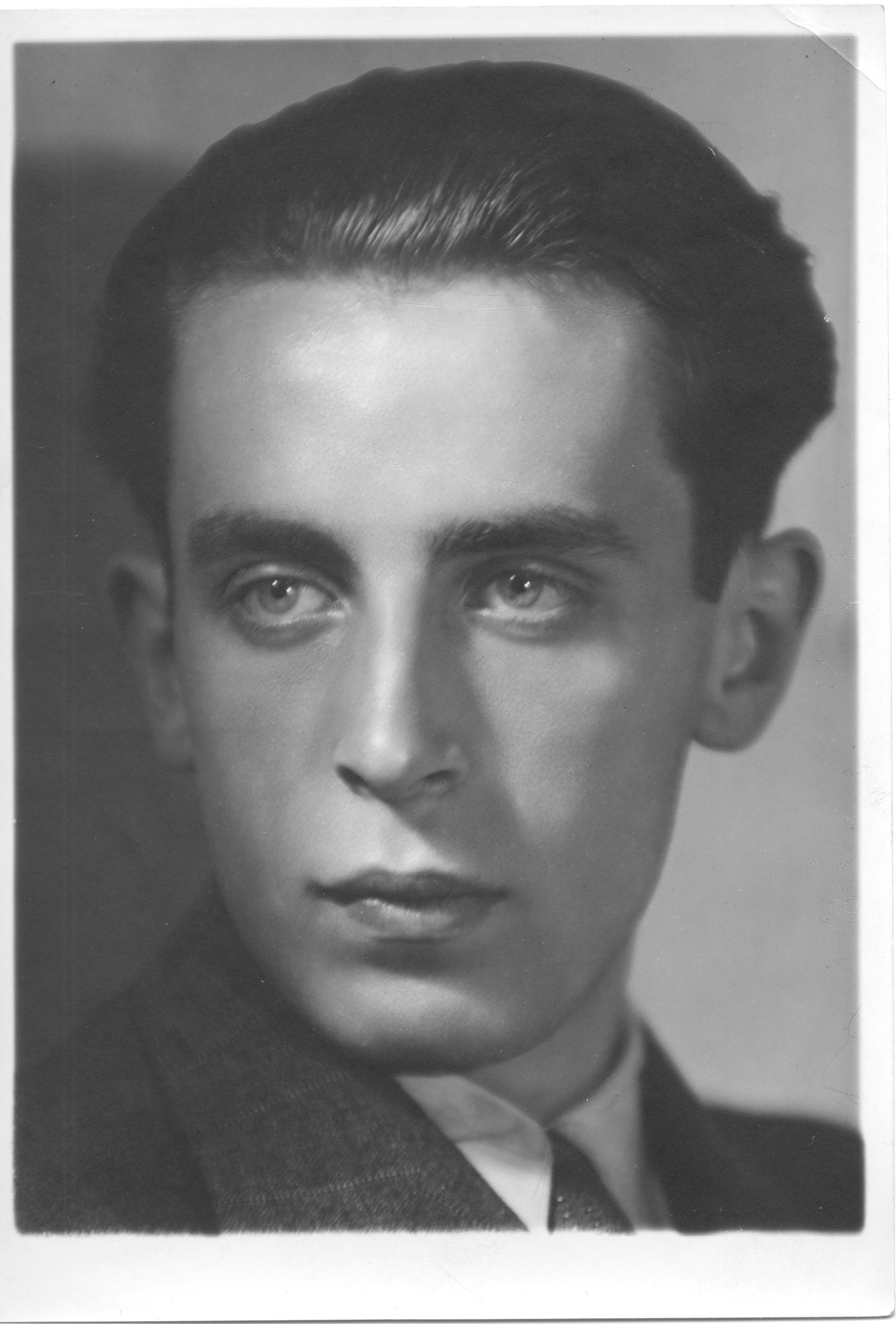
- Pavel Štěpán profile.

Background information
- Genres: Classical music
- Occupation: Pianist
- Instrument: Piano

Pavel Štěpán (28 May 1925 – 30 September 1998) was a Czech pianist whose domain was the interpretation of piano works by Josef Suk, Vitezslav Novak and Wolfgang Amadeus Mozart's piano concertos. He has always been described as a man of unusual intelligence, great pianistic style and deep musicality.

== Biography ==
Štěpán was born in Brno. His career coincided with his family's musical tradition: he was the grandson of Professor Vilém Kurz, a prominent Czech piano educator, and the son of piano virtuoso and teacher Ilona Štěpánová-Kurzová and musicologist/pianist Václav Štěpán. His family maintained close personal contacts with the composer Josef Suk, and actually received instructions for the interpretation of his piano output from the composer himself.

Pavel Štěpán made his first public appearance at the age of sixteen, two years later to make his debut performance with the Czech Philharmonic playing Mozart's Piano Concerto No.24 in C minor K 491 under the baton of Rafael Kubelík. In 1971 and 1982 he received the Wiener Flötenuhr award for the year's best Mozartian recording, and in 1978 his reading of the complete piano works of Josef Suk was presented Supraphon Golden Disc as recording of the year. He died, aged 73, in Prague.

== Best known recordings ==
- Mozart: Piano Concerto No. 23 in A major, K. 488, conducted by Zdeněk Mácal, Czech Philharmonic, Wiener Flötenuhr 1971 Supraphonline
- Mozart: Piano Concerto No. 27 in B major, K, 595, conducted by Mácal, Czech Philharmonic, Wiener Flötenuhr 1971 Supraphonline
- Mozart: Piano Concerto No. 24 in C minor, K. 491, conducted by Václav Neumann, Czech Philharmonic, Wiener Flötenuhr 1982
- Mozart: Rondo in D major, K. 382, conducted by Neumann, Czech Philharmonic, Wiener Flötenuhr 1982

== Gallery ==
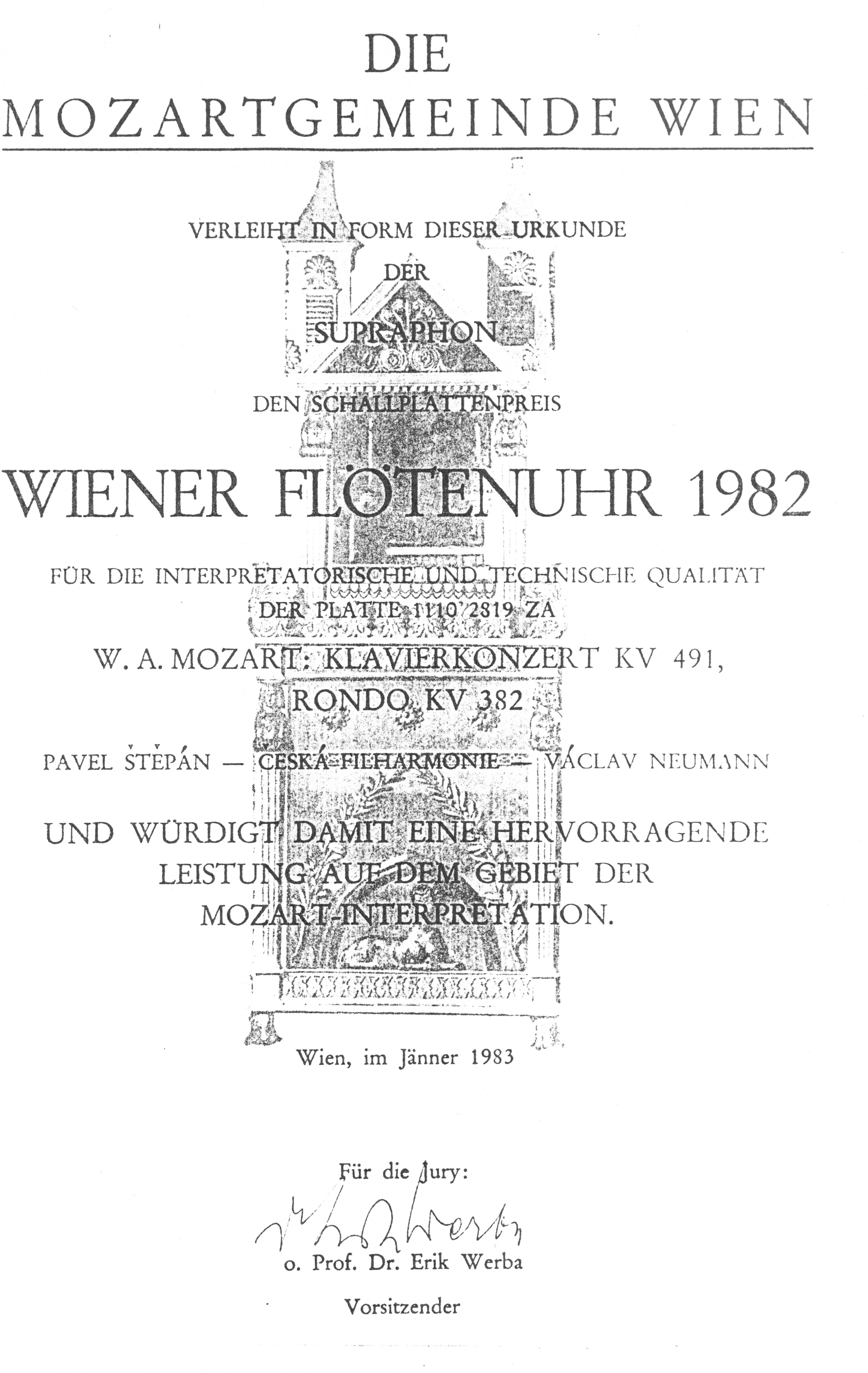
Wiener Flötenuhr 1982
