= Rudolf Firkušný =

Czech-American pianist (1912–1994)

External audio
- You may hear Rudolf Firkušný performing Antonin Dvorak's Piano Concerto in G minor, Op.33 with George Szell conducting the Cleveland Orchestra in 1954 Here on archive.org

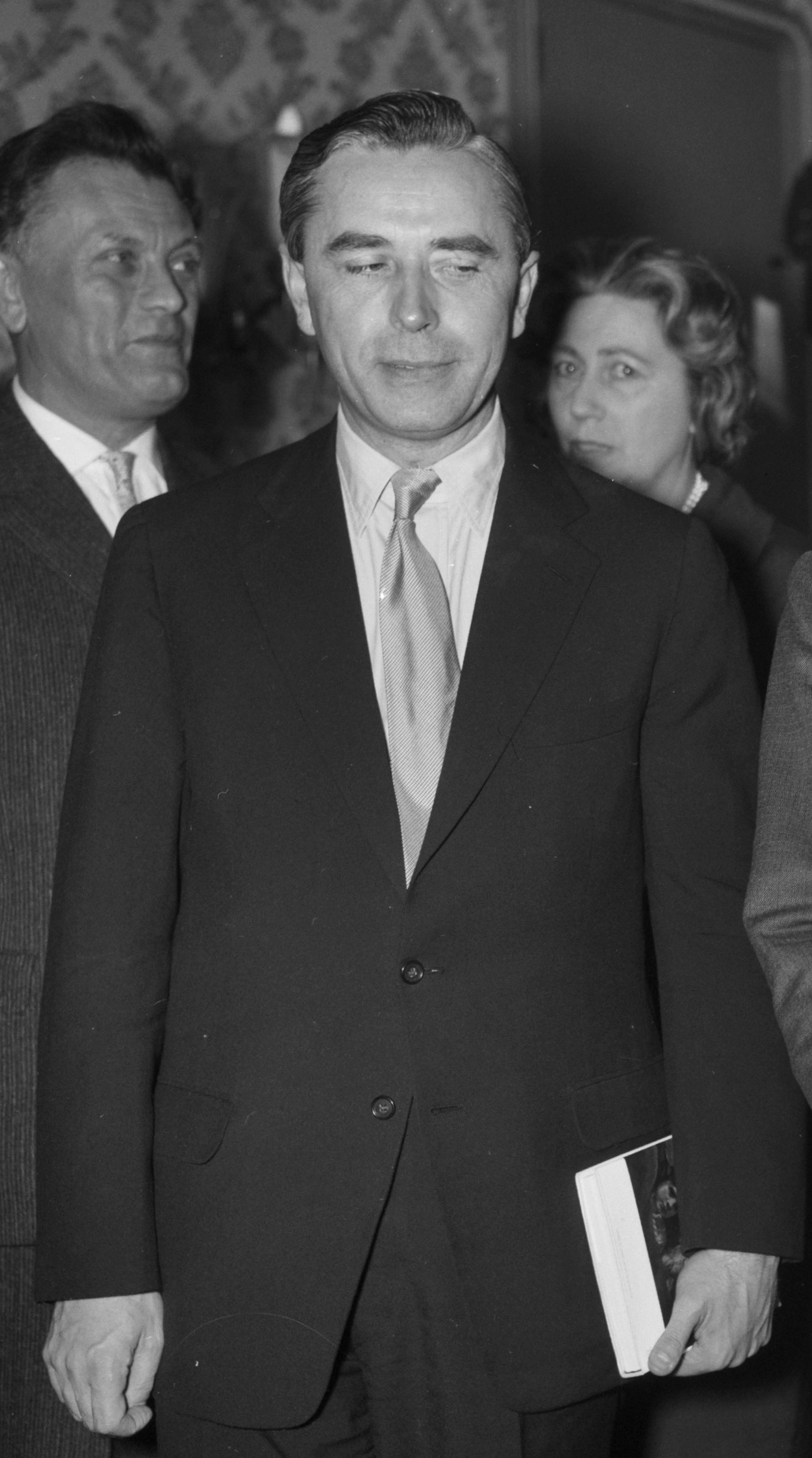
Firkušný in 1960

Rudolf Firkušný (Czech: [ˈrudolf ˈfɪrkuʃniː]; 11 February 1912 – 19 July 1994) was a Czech and American classical pianist.

== Life ==
Firkušný was born on 11 February 1912 in Napajedla, Moravia, Austria-Hungary. He was the younger brother of the musicologist Leoš Firkušný. Rudolf Firkušný started his musical studies with the composers Leoš Janáček and Josef Suk, and the pianist Vilém Kurz. Later he studied with the legendary pianists Alfred Cortot and Artur Schnabel. He began performing on the continent of Europe in the 1920s, and made his debuts in London in 1933 and New York in 1938. He escaped the Nazis in 1939, fled to Paris, later settled in New York and eventually became a U.S. citizen.

Firkušný had a broad repertoire, performing the works of Mozart, Beethoven, Schubert, Schumann, Chopin, and Brahms as well as Mussorgsky and Debussy. However, he became known especially for his performances of the Czech composers Bedřich Smetana, Antonín Dvořák, Leoš Janáček, and Bohuslav Martinů (who wrote a number of works for him).

Firkušný championed Dvořák's only piano concerto, which he played with many different conductors and orchestras around the world and also recorded several times. Originally, he performed the revised version made by his teacher Kurz and even arranged it further; yet in the end, he came back to the original Dvořák score.

Firkušný was also a devoted chamber player, and among his most prominent partners were cellists Pierre Fournier, Gregor Piatigorsky, János Starker, and Lynn Harrell; violinists Nathan Milstein and Erika Morini; violist William Primrose; and the Juilliard String Quartet. He also gave many first performances of contemporary composers, not only Czech such as by his friends Martinů and Vítězslava Kaprálová but also Howard Hanson, Gian Carlo Menotti, Samuel Barber, and Alberto Ginastera.

Firkušný taught at the Juilliard School in New York, and in Aspen, Colorado as well as in the Berkshire Music Centre in Tanglewood. Among his students were Yefim Bronfman, Eduardus Halim, Alan Weiss, Sara Davis Buechner, Carlisle Floyd, Kathryn Selby, Avner Arad, June de Toth, Richard Cionco, Robin McCabe, Anya Laurence, Natasa Veljkovic and Carlo Grante. After the fall of the communist government in his homeland (the "Velvet Revolution" of 1989), Firkušný returned to Czechoslovakia to perform for the first time after more than 40 years of absence. This was acclaimed as one of the major events of his festival, along with the return of his compatriot and friend the conductor Rafael Kubelík. Firkušný retained his remarkable talents well into his later years and, for example, played a full Dvořák-Janáček-Brahms-Beethoven sonata recital in Prague on 18 May 1992 together with the violinist Josef Suk (the namesake and grandson of his teacher, and great-grandson of Dvořák). He played only two times at the Prague Spring International Music Festival. The first time was in 1946, when he performed Dvořák's piano concerto, and in 1990 he played the second piano concerto of Martinů.

Firkušný won praise from his famous colleague Vladimir Horowitz, who once exclaimed, "Rudolf Firkušný can play Schubert, that's for sure. I heard him on the radio this afternoon ... playing the three Klavierstücke. Beautiful!" And the noted piano teacher and critic David Dubal called Firkušný "the preeminent Czech pianist of the twentieth century."

In 1990 he received an honorary doctorate from Charles University in Prague and the Order of Tomáš Garrigue Masaryk from President Václav Havel. Later in 1993, he received other honorary doctorates from Masaryk University in Brno and from Janáček Academy of Music and Performing Arts.

Firkušný died in Staatsburg, New York in 1994. He was survived by a son, Igor Firkusny, and a daughter, Veronique Firkusny Callegari, a Barnard College graduate and award-winning translator.

In 2007, his ashes and those of his wife, Tatiana Nevolová Firkušný, were reburied together in an honorary place at the Brno Central Cemetery in Brno, close to his first teacher, Janáček, and directly next to the grave of Czech composer Jan Novák. In 2012, coinciding with the 100th anniversary of his birth, there was a large festival held by Brno's Janáček Academy of Music and Performing Arts to commemorate the centennial, featuring many of his former alumni from the Juilliard School. In 2013, the Prague Spring Festival established the Rudolf Firkušný Piano Festival held in Prague.

His student Carlisle Floyd's only piano sonata was written for Firkušný in the 1950s. Firkušný performed it once, at a Carnegie Hall recital. It then languished until being taken up in 2009 by the 74-year-old Daniell Revenaugh, who studied it with the composer and made its first recording.

== Discography selection ==
- Beethoven: Sonatas No. 8 in C minor, Op. 13 "Pathetique"; No. 14 in C-sharp minor, Op. 27 "Moonlight"; No. 21 in C major, Op. 53 "Waldstein"; No. 30 in E, Op. 109 (EMI)
- Beethoven: Concerto No. 3 in C minor, Op. 37, with the New York Philharmonic/Guido Cantelli (AS Disc)
- Beethoven: Concerto No. 5 in E♭ major, Op. 73, with the Pittsburgh Symphony Orchestra/William Steinberg (Decca)
- Beethoven: Sonata No. 3 in E♭ major, Op. 12, for violin and piano; Mozart: Sonata in C major, K. 296 for violin and piano, with Erica Morini, violin (Decca)
- Beethoven: Sonata No. 8 in G major, Op. 30, for violin and piano
- Benda: Sonata No. 9 (Vox)
- Brahms: Sonatas No. 1 in F minor, Op. 120, for viola and piano; No. 2 in E♭, Op. 120, for viola and piano, with William Primrose, viola (EMI)
- Brahms: Concerto No. 1 in D minor, with the Pittsburgh Symphony Orchestra/William Steinberg (EMI)
- Brahms: Firkušný plays Brahms (EMI)
- Brahms: Sonata No. 3 in D minor, Op. 108, for violin and piano, with Erica Morini, violin (Decca)
- Brahms: Cello Sonatas, op. 38 & 99, with Pierre Fournier, cello (Deutsche Grammophon)
- Chopin: Sonata No. 3 in B minor, Op. 58, Nocturne in E♭, Polonaise in C minor, Scherzo in B♭ minor, Barcarolle, Waltz in C♯ minor, Nocturne in D♭, Grande valse brillante (EMI)
- Debussy by Firkušný. Capitol.
- Debussy: Estampes (Sugano)
- Dussek: Sonata No. 28 in F minor, Op. 77 "L'Invocation" (Vox)
- Dvořák: Concerto for Piano and Orchestra in G minor, Op. 33, with the Czech Philharmonic/Rafael Kubelík (Multisonic)
- Dvořák: Concerto for Piano and Orchestra in G minor, Op. 33, with the Vienna State Opera Orchestra/Laszlo Somogyi (Westminster)
- Dvořák: Concerto for Piano and Orchestra in G minor, Op. 33, with the Czech Philharmonic, Václav Neumann (RCA)
- Dvořák: Piano Quartets, Opp. 23 31, and 87, Bagatelles, Op. 47, with the Juilliard String Quartet (CBS)
- Dvořák: Piano Quintets, with the Ridge Quartet (RCA)
- Dvořak: Dvořák in Prague: a Celebration, with Yo-Yo Ma, Itzhak Perlman, Frederica von Stade, the Prague Philharmonic Chorus, the Boston Symphony Orchestra and Seiji Ozawa (Sony)
- Franck: Symphonic Variations, with the Royal Philharmonic Orchestra/Claus Peter Flor (RCA)
- Haydn: Sonatas for piano Nos. 33 and 59 (BBC Legends)
- Janáček: Concertino for piano, 2 violins, clarinet, bassoon a French horn; Capriccio forpiano and wind ensemble, with the Czech Philharmonic/Václav Neumann (Supraphon)
- Janáček: Complete Works for Piano, with the Bayerische Rundfunk Symphony Orchestra/Rafael Kubelík (Deutsche Grammophon)
- Martinů: Piano Concerto No. 2, with the Czech Philharmonic/Jiří Bělohlávek (Supraphon)
- Martinů: Piano Works (RCA)
- Martinů: Piano Concertos Nos. 2, 3, 4, with the Czech Philharmonic/Libor Pešek (RCA)
- Martinů: Cello Sonatas 1,2 and 3, with the Hungarian born cellist Janos Starker (RCA, at BMG Studio, New York, 1990)
- Mendelssohn: Piano Concerto No. 1 in G minor, with the Luxembourg Radio Symphony Orchestra/Louis Froment (Vox)
- Mozart: Fantasia in C minor K. 475; Sonata in C minor K. 396 (Columbia)
- Mozart: Piano Concertos K. 271, K. 451, K. 456, K. 466, K. 491, K. 503, with the SWF Sinfonie-Orchester Baden-Baden/Ernest Bour (Intercord)
- Mozart: Piano Concerto K.466, with the Kölner Rundfunk-Sinfonie-Orchester/Günter Wand (Hänssler)
- Mozart: Concerto for Two Pianos in E♭, K. 365; sonatas for four hands and two pianos, with Alan Weiss (Vox)
- Mussorgsky: Pictures at an Exhibition (Deutsche Grammophon Gesellschaft)
- Ravel: 3 piano pieces (Deutsche Grammophon Gesellschaft)
- Schubert: Impromptus, Opp. 90, 142 (Philips)
- Schubert: Drei Klavierstucke, D. 946 (BBC Legends)
- Schubert: Sonata in B♭ Major, D. 960 (BBC Legends)
- Schumann: Piano Concerto in A Minor, Op. 54, with the Luxembourg Radio Symphony Orchestra/Louis Froment (Vox)
- Schumann: Davidsbündlertänze; Symphonic Etudes; Kinderszenen (EMI)
- Smetana: Czech Dances (EMI)
- Smetana: Fantasy in C major, Op. 17, Trio in G minor, with Kaufmann Van den Burg (Columbia)
- Tomášek: Eclogue (Vox)
- Voříšek: Impromptu No. 4, Op. 7 (Vox)

== Videography ==
- Dvořák in Prague: A Celebration (1993), Kultur DVD, D4211, 2007
