= Concertino (Janáček) =

Composition by Leoš Janáček

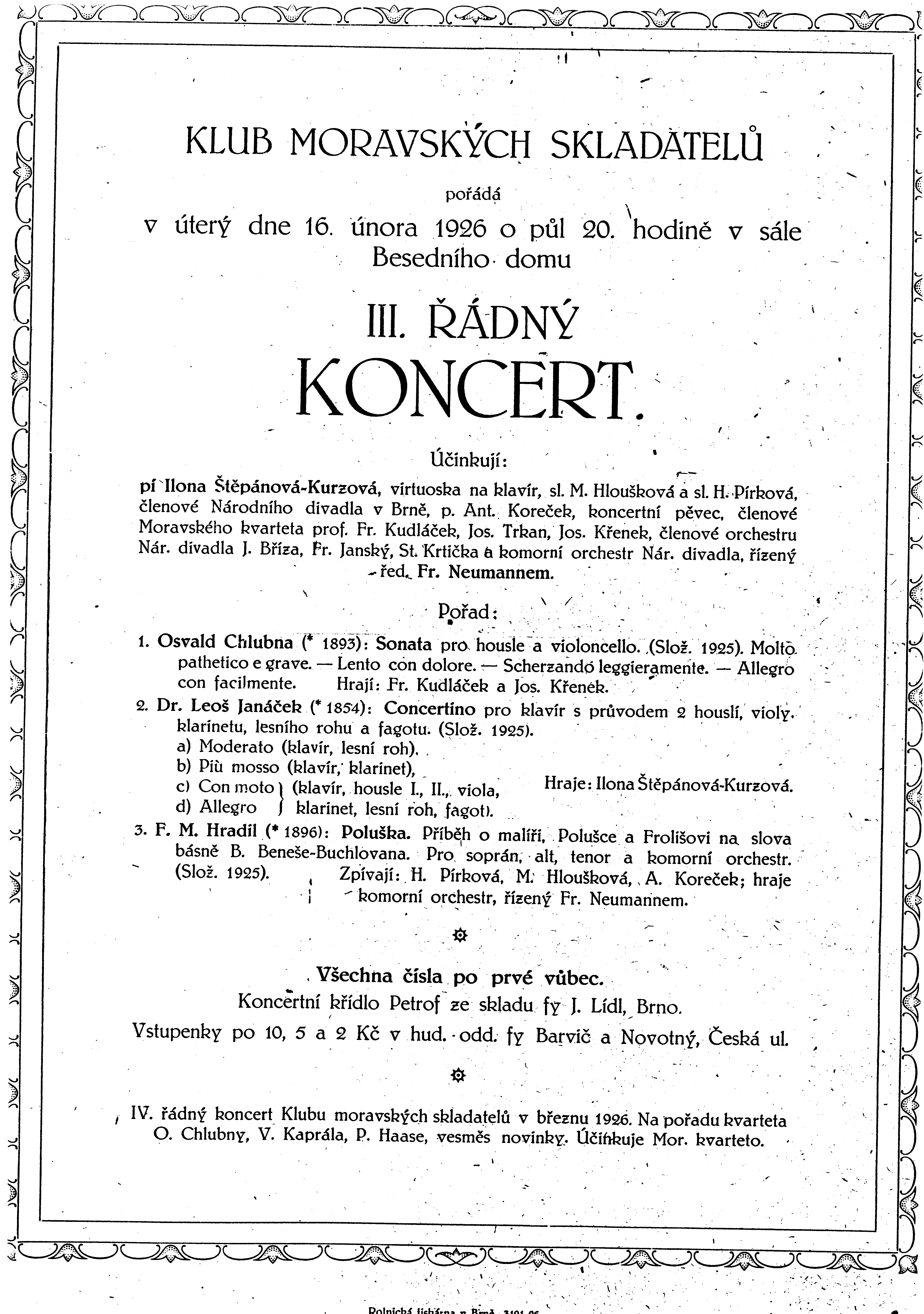
Première of Janáček's Concertino, 16 February 1926

The Concertino for piano, two violins, viola, clarinet, French horn and bassoon is a composition by the Czech composer Leoš Janáček.

== Background ==
The composition was written in first months of 1925, but Janáček decided on its inception in the end of 1924. He was impressed by the skills of pianist Jan Heřman, and therefore he dedicated the composition to him. (The first printing by Hudební matice from 1926 bears the dedication: "To Jan Heřman"). The concertino was at first intended to be a piano concerto, but later grew into a small chamber concerto. It was first entitled "Spring". This title Janáček wrote into the finished manuscript; he also added a date (25 April 1925) and a program note. The première of this 'small concerto' took place on 16 February 1926 in Brno at the third concert of the Moravian Composer's Club. The piano part was performed by Ilona Štěpánová-Kurzová, František Kudláček played first violin, Viktor Nopp the second, the viola was played by Josef Trkan, the clarinet by Stanislav Krtička, František Janský played French horn and František Bříza the bassoon. The work was successful: it was played twice at its premiere and soon received great acclaim in Europe.

== Structure ==
The composition consists of four movements:

1. Moderato
2. Più mosso
3. Con moto
4. Allegro

In 1927 Janáček added a commentary to the definitive program. The theme from the first movement is compared to a "grumpy hedgehog", the clarinet in the second movement to a "fidgety squirrel", the atmosphere of the third part is compared to a "night owl and other night animals", and the last movement is considered by the composer as the "scene from a fairy-tale, where everybody is arguing". The first movement contains only horn and piano, the second only clarinet and piano; other instruments join in during the third and fourth movements.
