= Anton Ginsburg =

Russian pianist

Anton Ginsburg (18 September 1930 – 19 July 2002) was a Russian pianist. He was born in Moscow. A disciple of Heinrich Neuhaus, he graduated from the Moscow Conservatory in 1953. Four years later he won the Smetana Competition in Prague. Ginsburg has been active as a concert pianist both in the USSR and abroad, but is best remembered for his work as an accompanist with Daniil Shafran.

Anton Ginsburg is Merited Artist of the Russian Federation.
