= Daniil Shafran =

Soviet cellist

Daniil Shafran Даниил Шафран
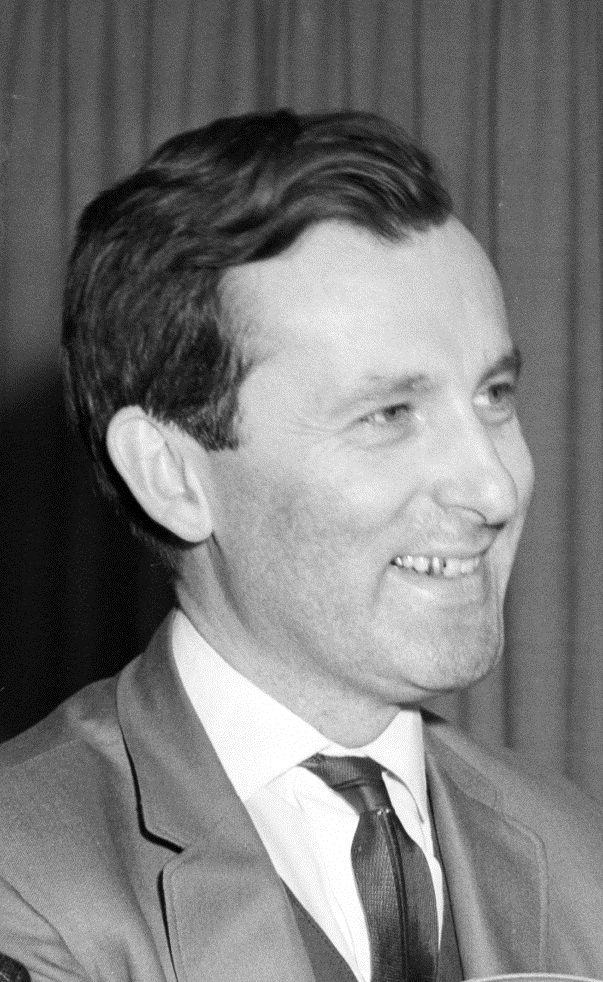
- Shafran in 1966

Background information
- Born: January 13, 1923; Petrograd, RSFSR
- Died: February 7, 1997 (aged 74) Moscow, Russia
- Occupation: Cellist

Daniil Borisovich Shafran (Russian: Даниил Борисович Шафран, January 13, 1923 – February 7, 1997) was a Soviet Russian cellist.

== Biography ==
=== Early years ===
Daniil Shafran was born in Petrograd (later Leningrad, then Saint Petersburg) in 1923 to a Jewish family. Even from before his birth he was surrounded by music. His mother and father were music students when he was born. His father, Boris Shafran, went on to be principal cellist of the Leningrad Philharmonic Orchestra and his mother, Frida Moiseyevna, was a pianist. He recounted how, as his mother went into labour, his father was practicing passages from Haydn's D major Concerto in preparation for a recital, and was reluctant to go to the hospital until he had mastered a difficult technical passage.

Shafran was initially taught by his father, whom he had long begged for lessons. When aged eight and a half, his father bought him a cello and began teaching him. His father was a serious musician and strict teacher and after year and a half under his tutelage, Shafran had absorbed many of the values that he held throughout his life: diligent and regular practice and the importance of striving for the highest goals. A key principle established was to overcome technical obstacles by learning to play far beyond the demands of the work, and Shafran learned to be "mercilessly strict with myself when practicing".

When he was ten years old (other sources say eight), his father took him to Alexander Shtrimer (1888–1961), then professor at the Leningrad Conservatory, for lessons. Initially this was at the Conservatory Special Music School for Children, where Shtrimer also taught, and then at the Conservatory itself where Shafran was one of ten talented children chosen to attend. Shafran remained with Shtrimer for more than ten years (into his early twenties). Though his father took a more active interest in his progress than might be "correct in terms of pedagogical ethics", he took no other teacher, commenting that "my own experiences and my association with my musician colleagues were all a 'second teacher' to me".

Shafran's first public performance was at the age of 10, at one of the Conservatory concerts, where he played two technically demanding works by David Popper: 'Spinning Song' and 'Elfentanz'. His orchestral debut was a year later, when 11, when he played Tchaikovsky's Rococo Variations with the Leningrad Philharmonic Orchestra under the visiting British conductor, Albert Coates.

At the age of 14, Shafran entered the 1937 USSR All-Union Competition for Violinists and Cellists, for young musicians from all Soviet states. Although strictly he was below the qualifying age limit, he was allowed to enter as an unofficial contestant and carried off the first prize. His young age, combined with "filigree virtuosity and poetic appearance", "caused something of a sensation", and Shafran achieved national prominence. Shafran was also awarded a magnificent Antonio Amati cello as part of the prize.

Musical activity in Leningrad was heavily impacted by the Second World War. Among many other activities in Russia, the All-Union competition was suspended for 7 years. Only in 1945 was it held again, when the war in Russia was over, and this time the winner was the young Mstislav Rostropovich. By 1949, "Shafran’s supremacy as the country's leading young cellist was now being challenged by Rostropovich, four years his junior." Shafran and Rostropovich both entered the 1949 competition at the Festival of Democratic Youth, Budapest, and they tied for the first prize. David Oistrakh, a jury member at the competition, wrote "both cellists are complete masters of cello sound. Their light virtuosity and elegant technique should be the envy of many violinists".

The following year Shafran and Rostropovich again met in competition, at the Wihan contest in Prague – an event to commemorate the centenary of the Bohemian Cellist Hanus Wihan (1850–1920), himself a pupil of Karl Davydov. Shafran performed the Rococo Variations in the final round, (which by his own admission, he had not played successfully), and yet, again, Shafran and Rostropovich were the joint prize-winners.

When Shafran graduated from the Conservatory in 1950, he was now 27 years old, and Rostropovich 23. For almost a decade, they stood out as the two outstanding young Russian cellists. "Both had already achieved an extraordinary level of artistry, yet they were temperamentally very different. Shafran's attention to detail made him pre-eminent in miniature forms: his poetic sensibility and the remarkable palette of tone colours he had at his disposal suit him to romantic and impressionistic repertoire". But in large forms, the musician's achievements were no less great.

=== Concert career ===
Shafran pursued a career as soloist and recorded very widely. His repertoire included the major concertos, music for cello and piano, and the solo cello repertoire. His astonishing technique in the higher register enabled him to perform a wide range of violin works at original pitch. He also sought to enrich the cello repertoire, and made and performed transcriptions of works for other instruments. However, he rarely toured outside the Soviet Union and the Eastern bloc, and virtually all his recordings were for the Melodiya label, so his international reputation was very limited.

In 1950, Shafran moved to Moscow, separating him from his family and his teacher on whom he had depended for so long - an event which caused him an artistic crisis. His early career was, in his own observation "rather hard. I made blunders, but this is only natural". Like so many prodigies, Shafran needed to develop into a mature artist, and his first wife and recital partner, Nina Musinian, greatly helped him in this respect, encouraging him to break with his past, and find the space to experiment.

His early concerts and recordings show his stature. His first recording, at age 14, was of the Rococo Variations. In 1946 he performed in Romania with George Enescu at the piano. In 1954 he recorded Kabalevsky's First cello Concerto, under the baton of the composer. Kabalevsky was sufficiently impressed that he dedicated his Second Cello Concerto to Shafran, who gave the premiere and made the first recording in 1965. In 1956 he made a "legendary recording" of the Shostakovich Cello Sonata, with the composer at the piano. He observed that "No matter what I asked or suggested ... Shostakovich listened to every word ... and agreed to any new details ... even those that went against his original notation in the score", highlighting not only Shostakovich's character, but Shafran's confidence in his own musical vision. In 1962 he performed the Khachaturian Cello Concerto under the direction of the composer.

Shafran made a number of concert tours and recordings together with his first wife, pianist Nina Musinian. Later on, he formed a long-lasting partnership with the pianist Anton Ginsburg.

Shafran's American debut was in 1960 in Carnegie Hall, at which concert he met Osip Shtrimer, the brother of his teacher. His British premiere was not till 1964, with concerts in Wigmore Hall and the Royal Festival Hall. He visited Japan several times, and toured Australia. By the time the Berlin Wall fell, Shafran's concert career was nearing its end.

=== Interpretation and technique ===
Shafran had a poetic and sincere way of performing music. His vibrato, phrasing and virtuosity all added to his distinctively passionate performances. Characteristic of his style was his inimitable rich tone (unusual on a baroque instrument), his unlimited musical freedom, and his impeccable technical proficiency.

Shafran saw himself as a product of a Leningrad (rather than a Moscow) tradition that “attached great importance to technical matters, [but] gave more attention to interpretation, revealing the stylistic diversity of works, and developing the artistic propensities of the pupil”. Structured and disciplined practice was the foundation of his playing. “A small minority of string players can get by without constant practice, but I admit that I am not one”, he noted. Each day would start with a slow cantilena piece for about 15 minutes, “to refresh the reflexes” for tonal beauty. From his father, he learned to play a piece through at twice the written speed, to ensure that all technical challenges were met. “I must work and persevere without pause. And if there comes a time when I feel some element of my instrumental control is slipping, I immediately start exercises to rectify the situation. For the left hand… I execute great leaps over the fingerboard with all fingers, striving for exactness of intonation and purity of sound.” To develop tone control, he would take a piece of moderate difficulty, like Rachmaninoff's 'Vocalise', and play it high on the C-string instead of the A-string.

While having great technical mastery, Shafran saw technique as a means rather than an end. Although he followed David Oistrakh's advice “to include a virtuoso piece in your daily dozen”, and he highly recommend practicing the “old bravura works”, he felt that above all his music should be sincere, and he aimed to focus on “major music” with the depth for great expression. “I do detest and avoid music which is patently inferior or 'cheap'. When I encounter a work that does not immediately enthuse me, I always seek to discover something that may be hidden in its pages. If the work seems to lack profundity or expressiveness, I strive to compensate for this by instilling it with my own enthusiasm and imagination, and seek out the work's dramaturgic accents based on the general character of the music.

Shafran was mercilessly strict with himself, and his partners: “from first note to last, I cannot permit my partner's playing to sabotage my intentions”, but he was not dogmatic: “everything is permissible if it sounds beautiful, if it is justified artistically”.

He felt fingering should not be rigid or dogmatic, but must be subordinated to bringing out the content and expressiveness of a work. Noting that a player has a choice of many fingering combinations, he said the “selection must be geared to our own personal hand structure, stretch, finger length, flexibility, etc., and the instrument, too, must be taken into account”. He frequently employed what he called “revolutionary” fingerings, possible only because “every finger was well-trained and obedient”.

He developed a number of unusual technical features. He used the thumb and fourth finger extensively, throughout the compass of the cello, and his large hand combined with the diminutive Amati cello that he always played allowed him to make very large stretches and play octaves between thumb and 3rd finger, and also 1st and 4th fingers. His range of vibrato was unusually wide, grading from fine and violin-like through to a distinctive wide, pulsating and operatic throb. He achieved a very light staccato and spiccato, and he made his beautiful silvery sound using the bow at the tip far more than most cellists and liked the hair to be on the loose side. His bowing appeared rather like a violinist, very light and without effort, yet at the same time very intense.

In performance, his style was individual. He rehearsed in full concert dress, perched at the front of an unusually high chair, positioned on a little raised platform, and played with his eyes closed. His ritual preparation for concerts included early morning practice, eating, relaxation and mental preparation.

Cellist Steven Isserlis described Shafran as "unlike anyone else" as a cellist and musician. At a time when musical styles were converging through various media, Shafran's artistic voice remained distinct. His vibrato, phrasing, and rhythm formed a uniquely cohesive whole, while his virtuosity conveyed a musical personality that retained what Isserlis called "the passion, the simplicity and the poetry of a great Russian folk singer." Isserlis further noted that Shafran "was incapable of playing one note insincerely," adding that "his music spoke from the soul."

The pianist Sviatoslav Richter stated:"a brief association with the cellist Daniil Shafran gave me little pleasure. He was a great cellist, with a distinctive tone, but whenever he played, you always had the impression that he was thinking only of the moment when he would have an interesting high note that he could hold on to and produce an attractive sound. He also suffered from nerves. I stopped performing with him in 1951 and he then joined up with Grigory Ginzburg... As a musician, if not a cellist, Rostropovitch was incomparably more interesting, an artist of far greater stature. He dwarfed him completely."

=== Shafran's Amati cello ===
Unusually for a major cellist, Shafran played the same instrument throughout his life. He formed an unbreakable bond with the Antonio Amati cello that he won at the age of 14, and always played on it.

The cello is described as dating from 1630. The exact dates of Antonio Amati (son of Andrea Amati, and the elder of the two Brothers Amati) are not known for certain, being variously reported between 1540 and 1607 and 1555 to 1640. Sources such as Cozio report that the entire span of Antonio Amati's working life was 1588–1628. It is by all accounts a magnificent instrument, though somewhat smaller than full size. It has been questioned whether "any Amati, no matter how fine, is sufficiently powerful for a solo cellist at the summit of his career. Baroque instruments of that period would not normally have the power of a later master." However, Shafran's recordings give no hint that the Amati has any lack of power. On the other hand, any Amati surviving into the present time has been rebuilt in the neck to allow for a higher bridge, and these alterations would give the instrument more carrying power and a brighter, more piercing sound than it had in the original baroque setup. The use of metal strings at high tension would also add to the brighter sound.

Shafran, who was known for his sometimes remarkably individual fingerings, denied that they would only work for his hand and on a cello of this size: "Any cellist with a normal stretch can use my fingerings on a standard sized cello, though they would, of course, be more difficult for a cellist with a small finger stretch".

Daniil Shafran died in Moscow on February 7, 1997, aged 74. In September 1997, his widow, Svetlana Shafran, donated the Amati cello to the Glinka Museum.
