= Radoslav Kvapil =

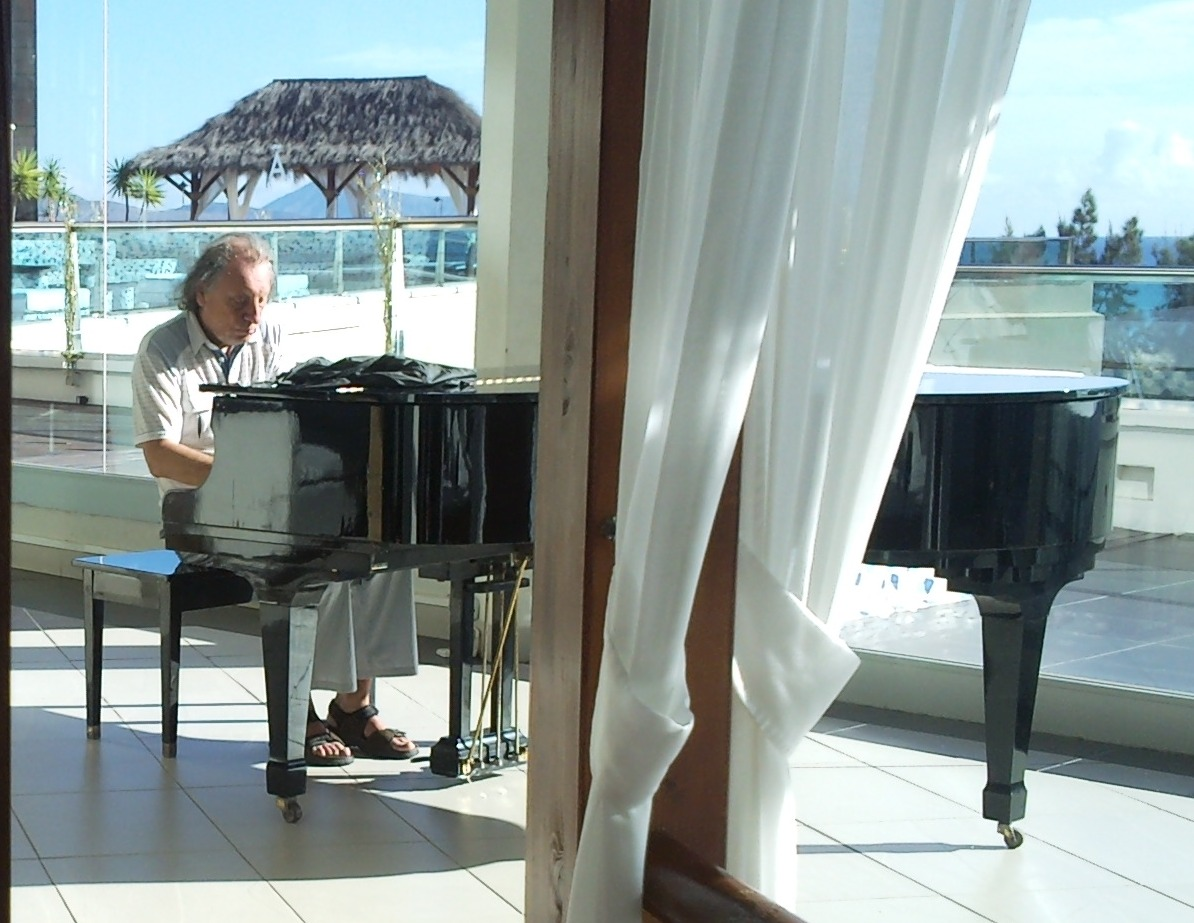

Radoslav Kvapil (born 15 March 1934 in Brno) is a Czech pianist.

At the end of the 20th century, he devoted his concert programmes to works by Frédéric Chopin, particularly in France, in the Chopin International Piano Festival in Nohant. On 21 October 2016 Radoslav gave a recital of Beethoven, Chopin, Dvořák, Janáček and Martinů at St Mary's Parish Church in Hay-on-Wye. He has recorded a CD for Alto of Chopin Complete Ballades and Impromptus, some of which he performed at the concert.

He is widely known as expert performer of Czech piano music, recording numerous discs of works by Dvořák, Smetana, Martinů, Janáček, Jan Václav Voříšek, Vítězslav Novák and Josef Suk. He has also recorded Studies by Chopin (coprod. Amat/Jean-Pierre Thiollet, 1999).
