= Antonín Kohout =

Antonín Kohout (12 December 1919 – 15 February 2013) was a Czech cellist and founder of the Smetana Quartet.

== Life ==
Kohout was born in Lubná in 1919. He studied with the cellist Karel Pravoslav Sádlo at Prague Conservatory; in 1941 at the Conservatory he met the violinist Václav Neumann, who invited him to join an amateur quartet. After changes of personnel the quartet, by then known as the Smetana Quartet, first performed professionally on 6 November 1945 at the Prague Municipal Library, with violinists Jaroslav Rybenský and Lubomír Kostecký, Neumann playing viola and Kohout playing cello; they played quartets by Bedřich Smetana and Vítězslav Novák. Kohout later said, "Our ideal was the Czech character of Smetana's music."

Neumann left in 1947 to pursue a conducting career, and there were other changed of personnel in later years. The quartet was affiliated to the Czech Philharmonic. From 1949, taking the example of the Kolisch Quartet and the Quartetto Italiano, they performed without the printed music; this continued until 1974, from which time they played only their Czech repertoire from memory.

From the 1950s the quartet toured extensively, and made many recordings. They were noted for playing works by Czech composers, including contemporary composers, and also played quartets by Mozart, Haydn, Beethoven and Schubert. From 1967 Kohout and the other quartet members taught at the Academy of Performing Arts in Prague.

In 1976, the quartet recorded, in Praha, Leos Janacek's two String Quartets for Supraphon. Kohout remained in the Smetana Quartet until its dissolution in 1989. He taught and was a mentor for later Czech quartets, including the Wihan Quartet, the Pražák Quartet, the Kocian Quartet, the Panocha Quartet and the Talich Quartet.

Kohout died in Prague in 2013, aged 93.
