= Pavel Hůla =

Czech violinist (1952–2021)

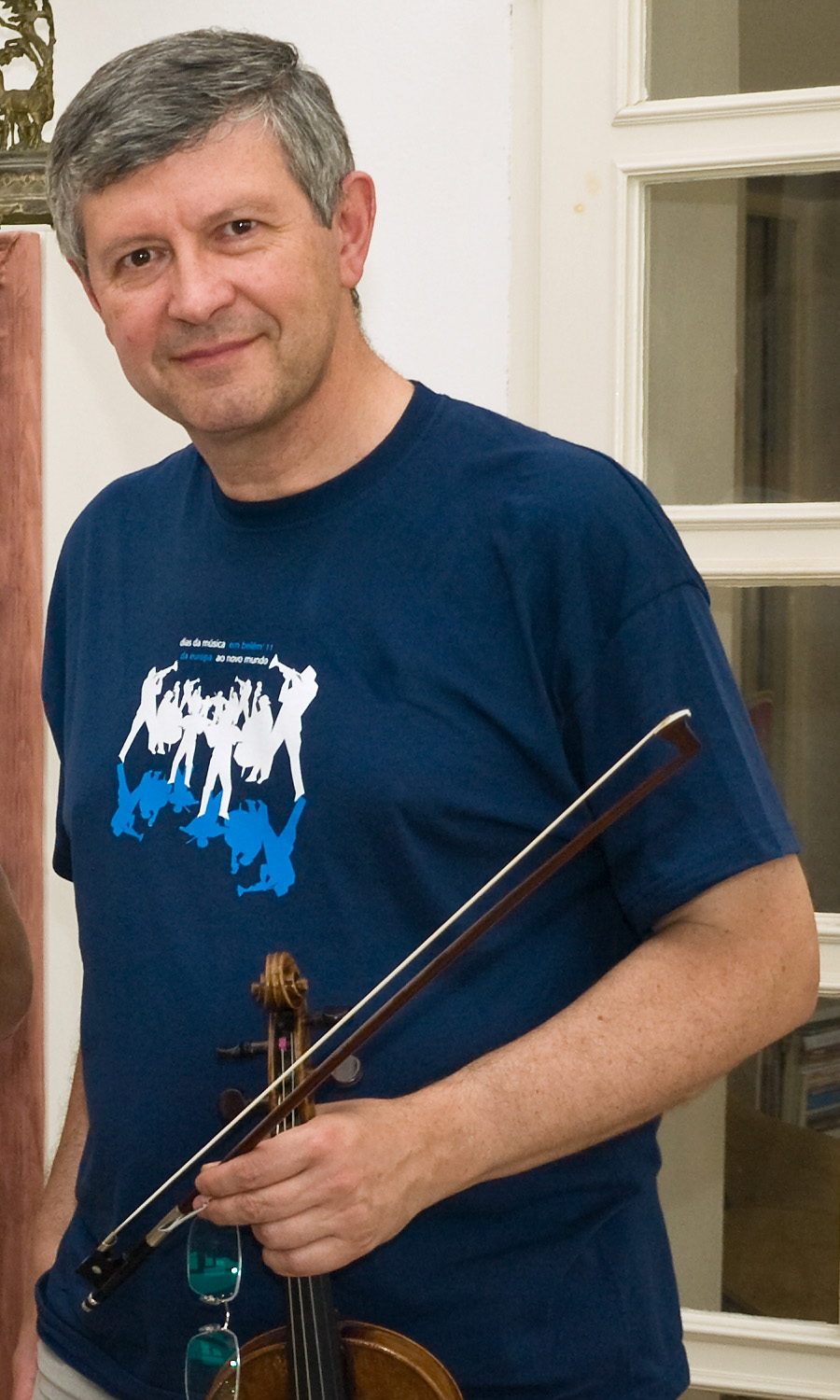
- Hůla in 2011

Background information
- Born: 23 January 1952; Prague, Czechoslovakia
- Died: 7 December 2021 (aged 69)
- Genres: Chamber music
- Occupation: Violinist

Pavel Hůla (23 January 1952 – 7 December 2021) was a Czech violinist, music conductor and music teacher.

== Career ==
Hůla became a double winner of the Kocian Violin Competition in Ústí nad Orlicí (1963 and 1964) and a laureate of the Concertino Praga radio competition in the piano trio category in 1969. He graduated from the School of Music of the Academy of Performing Arts in Prague and completed his post-graduate studies in chamber music with Antonín Kohout and Vladimir Malinin's master classes in Weimar. Hůla had devoted himself to solo and chamber music, serving as leader of the Prague Chamber Soloists from 1972 until 2000. He was principal of the Kocian Quartet, performing over 3000 concerts in 32 countries and received multiple awards (1997 Grand Prix du Disque de l'Académie Charles Cros in Paris, several Diapason d'Or and many others). Hůla was the artistic director of the Praga Camerata in 2001.

In 2006, Hůla devoted himself to conducting and was a professor at the String Instruments Department of the School of Music at the Academy of Performing Arts in Prague. He played a rare old violin, an instrument made by Mathias Albani in 1696, which Jaroslav Kocian played in his youth. In spring 2010, Hůla replaced as the Pražák Quartet's primus its founding member Václav Remeš, who left the ensemble for health reasons. He was himself replaced by Jana Vonášková-Nováková in 2015 due to health issues and died on 7 December 2021 at the age of 69.
