= Vectomov =

Vectomov or Večtomov is a surname that may refer to:

- Oleksandr Vechtomov, Ukrainian footballer
- Saša Večtomov (1930–1989), Czech cellist and music pedagogue
- Vladimír Večtomov (1946–2015), Czech classical guitarist, brother of Saša
