= Vlach Quartet =

Czech string quartet

The Vlach Quartet (Czech: Vlachovo kvarteto) is the name of two consecutive classical string quartet musical ensembles, based in Prague, both of which were founded by members of the Vlach family. The original Vlach Quartet was founded by Josef Vlach in 1950 and wound up in 1975. In 1982 the New Vlach Quartet (Czech: Nové Vlachovo kvarteto) was founded by his daughter Jana Vlachova, with guidance from her father, and came to be known as the Vlach Quartet of Prague (Czech: Vlachovo kvarteto Praha), and is still active as a musical ensemble.

== Vlach Quartet ==
Josef Vlach (Ratměřice, 8 June 1923 - Linköping, 17 October 1988) was a violinist, conductor and teacher in Prague. He shared the principal violin desk of the Czech Chamber Orchestra (as it existed under Václav Talich), with Jiri Novak, leader of the Smetana Quartet. In 1950 he founded the Vlach Quartet with members of the Orchestra. Over the next 25 years they produced interpretations of classical and Czech literature for string quartet, both in concerts and in recording, for which they had a contract with Supraphon Records. The original Vlach Quartet recordings include Beethoven op. 131, op. 18 nos. 1 & 6, op. 59 no. 1. In 1957 Josef Vlach also re-formed the Czech Chamber Orchestra.

=== Personnel ===
The personnel of the original Vlach Quartet in the period 1950-1975 were:

- 1st violin - Josef Vlach
- 2nd violin - Václav Snítil
- Viola
  - Soběslav Soukup (1948–1952)
  - Jaroslav Motlík (1952–1954)
  - Josef Koďousek (1954–1975)
  - Jiří Hanzl (from 1970)
- Cello - Viktor Moučka

== The New Vlach Quartet/Vlach Quartet Prague ==
The New Vlach Quartet was founded in 1982 by Jana Vlachová, Josef's daughter, who had played in a string quartet from childhood under her father's guidance and won first prize in the Concertino Praga international competition aged 14. She graduated from studies with Marie Hlounová at the Academy of Performing Arts in Prague (AMU), chose to concentrate on chamber music, and formed a duo with the Swedish cellist Mikael Ericsson in 1977. Ericsson had studied at the Royal Danish Academy of Music in Copenhagen, attended master-classes by Guy Fallot and Gregor Piatigorsky, and studied at the AMU in Prague with Josef Chuchro and Josef Vlach. He also has a recording career as a soloist. Karel Stadtherr, violinist, had performed with the Suk Chamber Orchestra (in contact with Josef Vlach) and was Concertmaster of the Prague Chamber Orchestra without Conductor. Petr Verner studied solo viola at the Prague Conservatory and at the AMU in Prague with Jiří Zika, Lubomír Malý, Milan Škampa and Jan Pěruška.

They received guidance and mentoring from Josef Vlach, imparting an interpretative tradition from the school of Václav Talich, and underwent a course of training by the Melos Quartet of Stuttgart. They expanded the range of the repertoire of the earlier Quartet, both in international scope and in the time-frame represented. They won the prize for best interpretation of a contemporary Czech work at the Czech String Quartet Competition in Kroměříž in 1983. Their performance and broadcasts focused both on the classics and on the Czech repertoire, including the works of Antonín Dvořák, Bedřich Smetana, Leoš Janáček, and Bohuslav Martinů. Beginning in 1995, they recorded all of Dvořák's string quartets for the Naxos label. Other recordings include works by Schubert, Haydn, John Fernström, and others, on the Naxos, Marco Polo, Bohemia Music and Panton labels.

The Quartet has performed throughout Europe, including Germany, Sweden, Denmark, Greece, and Luxembourg, and many of their concerts have been broadcast, for instance by the Bayerischer Rundfunk, the Südwestrundfunk, Danmarks Radio and Radio France. Czech Television has broadcast documentaries on both the old and the new Vlach Quartets. They have also toured the United States, with an opening concert in New York City in July 2004. They had a Residency in 1997 in Gifu, Japan, and were broadcast by NHK, Japan's principal network. In 2000 they led courses in interpretation at the conservatory in Ingesund, Sweden. In 2004 the Vlach Quartet Prague was Quartet-in-Residence in Schengen, Luxembourg.

The Quartet's main collaborations are with Maria Kliegel (cello), Jenö Jandó and Ivan Klánský (pianists), Eduard Brunner and Dieter Klöcker (clarinet) and Maximilian Mangold (guitar).

The quartet has received a number of prizes, including: an award for the best string quartet among the European competition at the International String Quartet Competition in Portsmouth, England, in 1985; the prize of the Czech Chamber Music Association in 1991; and the prize of the Czech Music Fund for a CD containing string quartets by Bedřich Smetana ("From My Life") and Leoš Janáček ("Intimate Letters") in 1992. In October 2000, they also won a Preis der deutschen Schallplattenkritik for a CPO recording of Esquisses Hébraïques: Clarinet Quintets on Jewish Themes, with Dieter Klöcker.

=== Personnel ===
- 1st violin - Jana Vlachová
- 2nd violin
  - Ondřej Kukal (with New Vlach Quartet in recordings of Arriaga quartets 1–3)
  - Karel Stadtherr
- Viola
  - Peter Verner (1985–2005)
  - Georg Haag (2006–2009 or 2010)
  - Jiří Kabát (since 2010)
- Cello - Mikael Ericsson
