= Jan Panenka =

Czech pianist (1922–1999)

Jan Panenka (8 July 1922 – 12 July 1999) was a Czech pianist. He recorded many of Beethoven's works, and he played for many years with the Suk Trio.

== Life ==
Jan Panenka began his concert career in 1944, as a pupil of František Maxián at the Prague Conservatory. In 1951 he was awarded the 2nd prize at the Prague Spring International Music Competition. He attracted attention in 1959, on a concert tour to Australia and Japan with the Czech Philharmonic. Panenka interrupted his career in 1979, due to hand problems. He worked as a conductor, but later returned to the piano and made recordings with the Smetana Quartet. He worked also as a teacher at the Academy of Performing Arts in Prague.

As a soloist with the Czech Philharmonic he made also a number of gramophone recordings, including the complete piano concertos of Ludwig van Beethoven (1964–71). He was awarded the Grand Prix du Disque for the recording of violin sonatas by Leoš Janáček and Claude Debussy, with Josef Suk.

== Discography ==
His recordings include works by:

- Ludwig van Beethoven
- Johannes Brahms
- Antonín Dvořák
- Leoš Janáček
- Bohuslav Martinů
- Franz Schubert
- Robert Schumann
- Josef Suk

He performed with the following musicians:

- Josef Suk
- Panocha Quartet
- Suk Trio
- Josef Chuchro
- Saša Večtomov
- Czech Philharmonic Orchestra
- Prague Symphony Orchestra
