= Josef Suk (violinist) =

Czech violinist, violist and conductor (1929–2011)

Josef Suk (Jr)
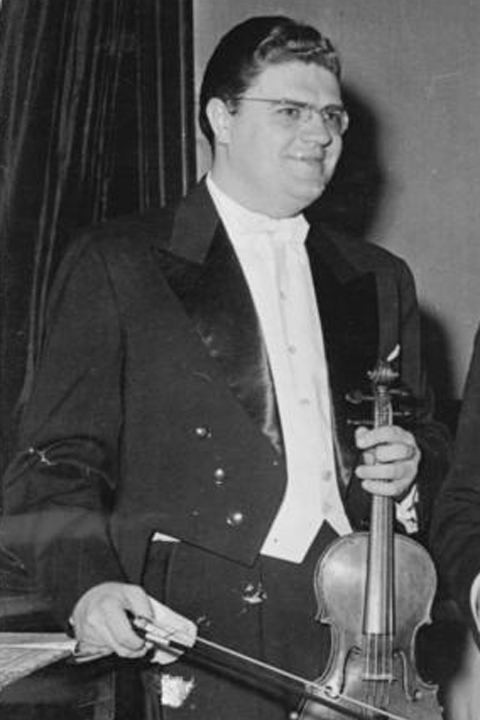
- Josef Suk (1957)

Background information
- Born: 8 August 1929; Prague, Czechoslovakia
- Died: 6 July 2011 (aged 81) Prague, Czech Republic
- Genres: Classical
- Occupations: violinist, violist, pedagogue, writer
- Instruments: Violin, Viola
- Years active: 1949 - 2011

Josef Suk (8 August 1929 – 7 July 2011) was a Czech violinist, violist, chamber musician and conductor. In his home country he carried the title of National Artist.

Suk's recordings of Dvořák's Violin Concerto, especially those with the Czech Philharmonic and conductors Karel Ančerl and Václav Neumann, are taken as references.

== Youth and studies ==
Josef Suk was born in Prague, the grandson of the composer and violinist Josef Suk, and great-grandson of the composer Antonín Dvořák. After finishing high school in 1945 he entered the Prague Conservatory (1945–1951), where his teachers were Jaroslav Kocián, Norbert Kubát and Karel Šnebergr.

The most important of all his teachers was Jaroslav Kocián, who started teaching him privately when Suk was seven years old. Led by him, Suk mastered the violin art drawing from the spectacular interpretative art of his teacher, who was specific with his technique of tone formation.

During his studies, in 1949, Suk was sent to Paris and Brussels where he represented successfully the young generation of Czech violinists.

After leaving the Prague Conservatory, he spent four terms at the Academy of Performing Arts in Prague (AMU) with the professors Marie Hlouňová and Alexandr Plocek. However, before finishing his studies he was suspended for political reasons.

AMU was rather a military and political school at that time. For example, I protested against being obliged to trench. That was because our fingers suffered – and I wanted to be a musician, not a soldier. That was the reason why I was suspended after four terms and detached to the military division of Košice for punishment. In the last minute I was saved when I got to the Army artist company, where I spent the two years of military service playing the violin.

Since the very beginning, when I got my first violin from my father, a binding feeling of big expectations bore on me. I wasn't sure whether I was able to be up to the wishes and hopes of my parents and my grandfather. The great commitment of filling my family tradition attached all my artist career. Sometimes it might have opened some gates and routes, but on the other hand it meant also an indispensable stress.

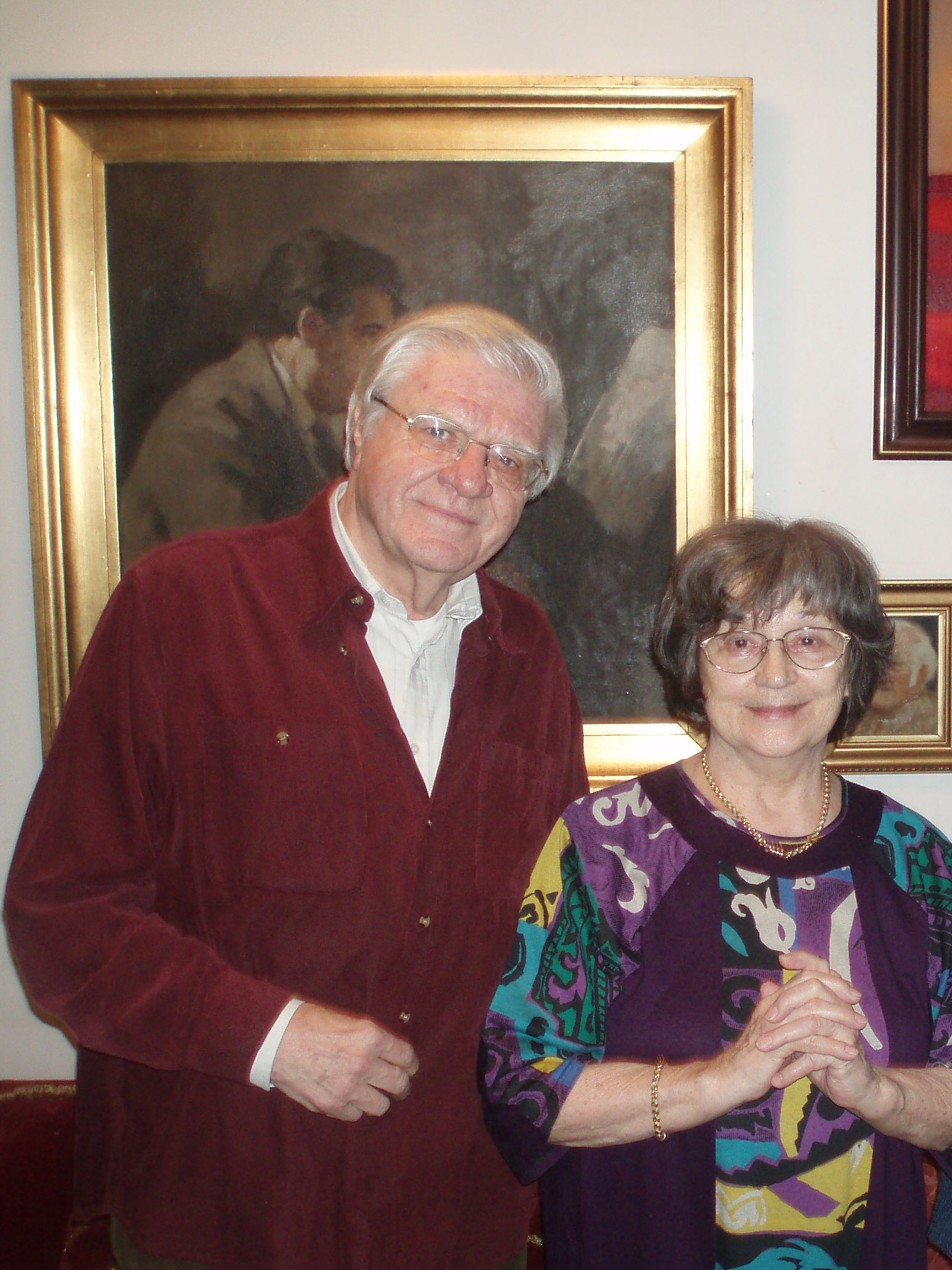
Josef Suk with his wife Marie

== Concert career ==
From 1950 to 1952, he was the primarius of the Prague quartet; from 1953 to 1955, he was concertmaster of the dramatic orchestra of the National Theatre in Prague; and until 1957, he was a soloist of the Army artist company.

His first significant success was a recital in Prague on 6 November 1954. Shortly after that George Szell invited him to the US to play with the Cleveland Orchestra. In 1958 he performed in Germany, Netherlands and Romania, then also in France and Belgium.

In 1960 he was lent the Antonio Stradivari violin called Duc de Camposelice, made in 1710. Its former owner was Váša Příhoda, who donated it to the Czechoslovak state shortly before his death. Suk also played the Libon Stradivari and The Prince of Orange violin by Giuseppe Guarneri del Gesu. He also used an instrument by Přemysl Špidlen for a long time.

In 1961 Suk was named as soloist of the Czech Philharmonic, playing on many of its tours and recitals. He cooperated, and made numerous recordings, with the world's best orchestras, conductors and interpreters. He won many prizes for his recordings – Grand Prix du Disque for Instrumental and Symphonic Music for Debussy's and Janáček's sonatas, for the Dumky Trio by Dvořák with Jan Panenka and Miloš Sádlo, for the complete collection of Mozart's violin concerts with the Pražský komorní orchestr [Prague Chamber Orchestra] conducted by Libor Hlaváček, for the Berg Concerto and for the concertos of Martinů. He again received the Grand Prix du Disque for other recordings from 1966 to 1978.

He was also a violist and he recorded the Sinfonia Concertante by Mozart, playing both parts of violin and viola. With the Czech Philharmonic, conducted by Dietrich Fischer-Dieskau, he recorded Harold en Italie by Hector Berlioz.

His violin art was characterized by a rotund and rich tone, glass-clear intonation and an idiomatic interpretation. Suk was one of the world's best interpreters of Bach, Mozart and Beethoven. His recordings of Dvořák's Violin Concerto are exemplary.

From 1979 to 1986 he was a teacher at the Music College in Vienna.

== Chamber music ==
Aside from his solo career he focused on chamber music. As a student (1950–1952) he was the primarius of the Prague quartet and in 1951 he founded the Suk Trio, named after his father Josef Suk, together with his friends Jiří Hubička (piano) and Saša Večtomov (cello), later with Jan Panenka (piano, replaced then by Josef Hála) and Josef Chuchro (cello). The Suk Trio played many concerts both home and abroad and recorded many compositions. With the trio's later pianist Jan Panenka Suk recorded the entire collection of Beethoven's sonatas, and their recording of Shostakovich's sonata for viola and piano was the very first. As a violist he often cooperated with the Smetana Quartet, mostly as second viola.

Another remarkable partnership was with the harpsichordist prof. Zuzana Růžičková. They were close friends and within many concerts they made many recordings, for example Bach's and Händel's sonatas. They were also dedicated a sonata by Růžičková's husband, Viktor Kalabis.

Suk also collaborated with Julius Katchen and János Starker when recording Brahms's trios and sonatas.

In 1974, as a commemoration of the 100th anniversary of birth of his grandfather Josef Suk, he founded the Suk Chamber Orchestra. Suk acted as its leader and conductor till 2000.

He held the title of Meritorious Artist and from 1977 the title of National Artist. In 2002 he was awarded the National Order of the Legion of Honour.

== Death ==
Suk died on 7 July 2011, aged 81, of prostate cancer and was buried in Prague, in the Vyšehrad cemetery.

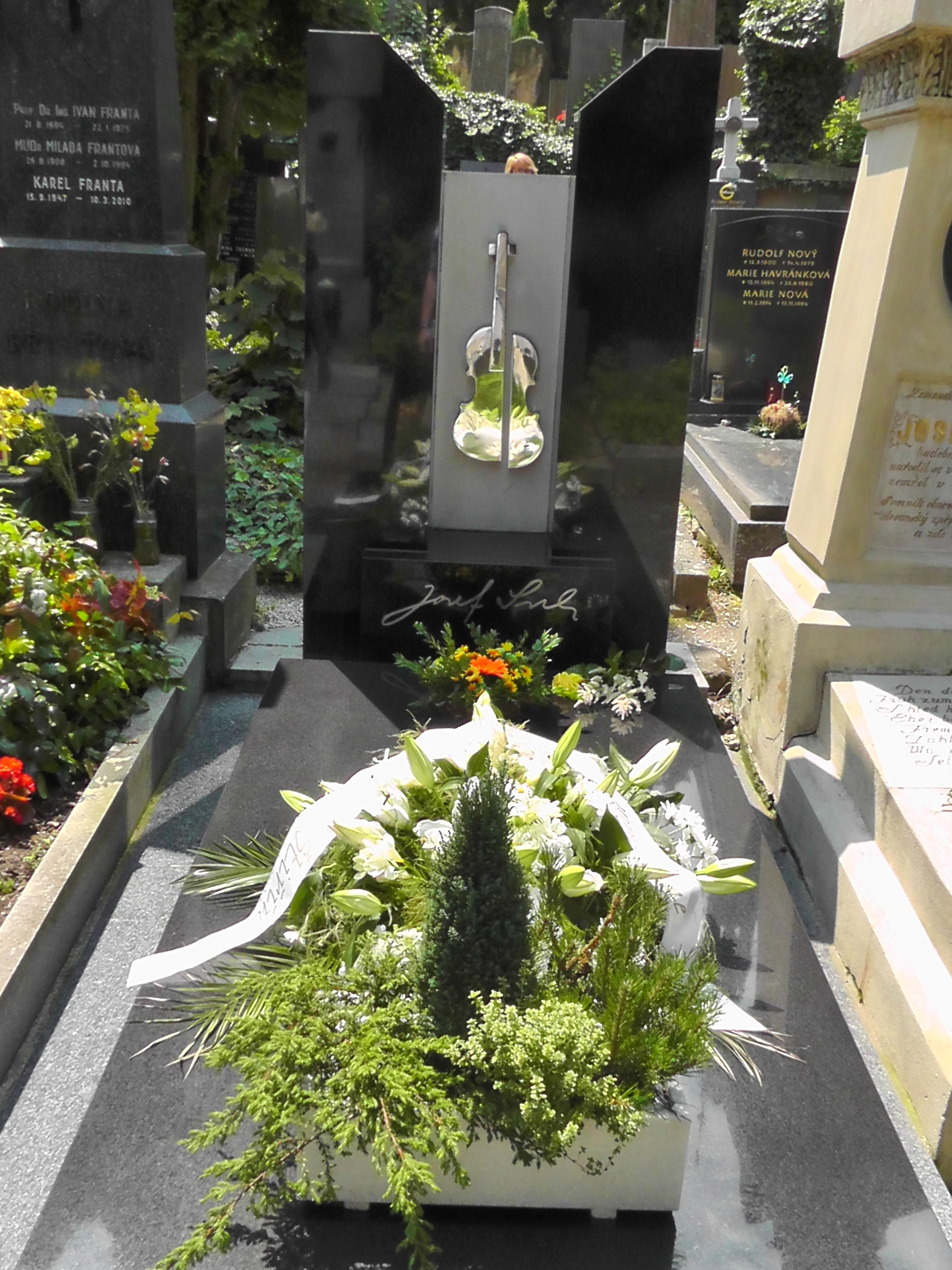
Tomb of Josef Suk at the Vyšehrad cemetery

== Selected discography (violin) ==
- J.S. Bach: Violin Concertos - Supraphon Records
- Bach: Sonatas for Harpsichord and Violin – Lotos Records
- Beethoven: Concerto for violin in D; Dvořák: Concerto for violin in A minor – BBC Radio Classic
- Bartók: Violin Concertos Nos. 1 and 2 - Praga Records
- Berg: Concerto for violin – Supraphon
- Bartók: Concerto for violin No. 1 - Supraphon
- Brahms: Concerto, Op. 77; Concerto, Op. 102 – Praga
- Brahms: Concerto, Op. 77; Concerto, Op. 102 – Praga
- Brahms: Piano Trios and Violin Sonatas with Julius Katchen (piano) and Janos Starker (cello) – Decca Records
- Brahms: Symphony No. 2 in D, Op. 73; Concerto in A minor, Op. 102 – Supraphon
- Brahms: Symphony No. 2/Double Concerto – Supraphon
- Brahms: The Violin Sonatas, with Julius Katchen – Decca (466 393–2)
- Chausson: Concerto for violin, piano & String Quartet; Fauré: Sonata No. 2 for Violin & Piano - Supraphon
- Dvořák: Concerto for violin in A minor – Supraphon
- Dvořák: Piano Quartets Nos. 1 & 2 – Supraphon
- Dvořák: Quartet Op. 51 / Sextet Op. 48 - Lotos
- Dvořák: Quintet in E-flat; Quintet No. 1 – Denon Records
- Dvořák: 'Songs My Great-Grandfather Taught Me' – Toccata Classics (2009)
- Dvořák: Trio No. 1; Trio No. 2 – Denon Records
- Dvořák: Violin Concerto; Romance; Josef Suk: Fantasy – Supraphon
- Dvořák: Works for Violin and Piano – Supraphon
- Janáček: Complete works for Violin, Cello and Piano – Carlton Classics
- Janáček: Sinfonietta, Op. 60; Taras Bulba, rhapsody – Supraphon
- Kodály: Musique de chambre – Praga
- Martinů: Sonata for violin No. 3; Madrigal Stanzas H.297 – Supraphon
- Mendelssohn: Concerto for violin in E minor; Bruch: Concerto for violin in G minor – Supraphon
- Mozart: Quintets – Denon Records
- Mozart: Sinfonia concertante in E-flat; Sinfonia concertante in E-flat – Panton Records
- Ravel: Sonatas for Violin and Piano; Sonata for Violin and Cello; Tzigane – Praga
- Schubert: String Quartet No. 1, D.87/String Quintet in C, Op. 163, D.956 - Praga
- Suk: Piano Quintets, Opp. 1 & 8 – Lotos
- Suk: Piano Trio; Piano Quartet; Piano Quintet – Supraphon
- Karel Ančerl Golden Edition No. 8. CD Supraphon: Praha 2002. SU 3668-2

== Honours ==
- Medal of Merit (1999)
