= Panocha Quartet =

Czech string quartet

The Panocha Quartet (Czech: Panochovo kvarteto) is a Czech string quartet.

== History ==
The Panocha Quartet was formed in 1968 at the Prague Conservatory from a trio consisting of Jiří Panocha (violin), Jaroslav Hlůže (viola), and Jaroslav Kulhan (cello). Following a suggestion from their teacher, Josef Micka, they recruited violinist Pavel Zejfart, completing the quartet. In 1971, Hlůže was replaced on the viola by Miroslav Sehnoutka.

In 1975, the ensemble won the Prague International String Quartet Competition and received the Bordeaux Gold Medal in 1976. They made their US début in 1975, followed by their German and Irish débuts the following year. In 1980, they toured Japan with the Smetana Quartet, whose members had previously been their teachers. Since then, they have established an international reputation.

The quartet's repertory, founded on the Czech masters and the Viennese classics, includes the complete cycles by Dvořák and Martinů (both of which they have recorded) and a large number of quartets by Haydn, as well as many 20th-century works. They have collaborated in recording and concerts with the renowned pianists such as Rudolf Firkušný, Jan Panenka, and András Schiff.

== Quartet members ==
Jaroslav Kulhan (born 1950) studied cello at the Prague Academy of Music with Josef Chuchro. Jiří Panocha (born 1950) studied violin at the Prague Conservatory with Josef Micka, and at the Prague Academy of Music with Jiří Novák. Panocha plays a 1743 violin by Carlo Antonio Testore of Milan. Miroslav Sehnoutka (born 1952) studied viola at the Prague Academy of Music with Milan Škampa. Pavel Zejfart (born 1952) studied violin at the Prague Conservatory with Josef Micka and at the Prague Academy of Music with Nora Grumlíková.
