= Cepicky =

Cepicky is a surname, probably Czech Čepický. Notable people with the surname include:

- Matt Cepicky (born 1977), American baseball player
- Scott Cepicky (born 1966), American politician
- Leoš Čepický, a violinist of the Wihan Quartet
