= Dvořák – In Love? =

1988 documentary film about Antonín Dvořák

Dvorak - in love?

Dvořák – In Love? is a 1988 documentary film about the Czech composer Antonín Dvořák and a recording of his Cello Concerto by Julian Lloyd Webber and the Czech Philharmonic conducted by Václav Neumann, which was made in the same year. The film also tells of a love affair for the composer that never was, but was the inspiration for the concerto.

Originally a co-production with Czechoslovak Television, the finished film and its political content could not be shown in Communist-ruled Czechoslovakia. Two years later, after the fall of communism, the film was the first documentary to be shown on the newly-liberated Czechoslovak Television.

== Credits ==
- Directed and edited by Tony Palmer
- The Dvořák Cello Concerto in B minor played by the Czech Philharmonic Orchestra conducted by Václav Neumann
- Julian Lloyd Webber, cello soloist
- The letters of Antonín Dvořák spoken by Vladek Sheybal
