= Josef Suk =

Josef Suk may refer to:

- Josef Suk (composer) (1874–1935), Czech composer and violinist
- Josef Suk (violinist) (1929–2011), his grandson, Czech violinist and conductor
