= Veselí nad Lužnicí =

- Town
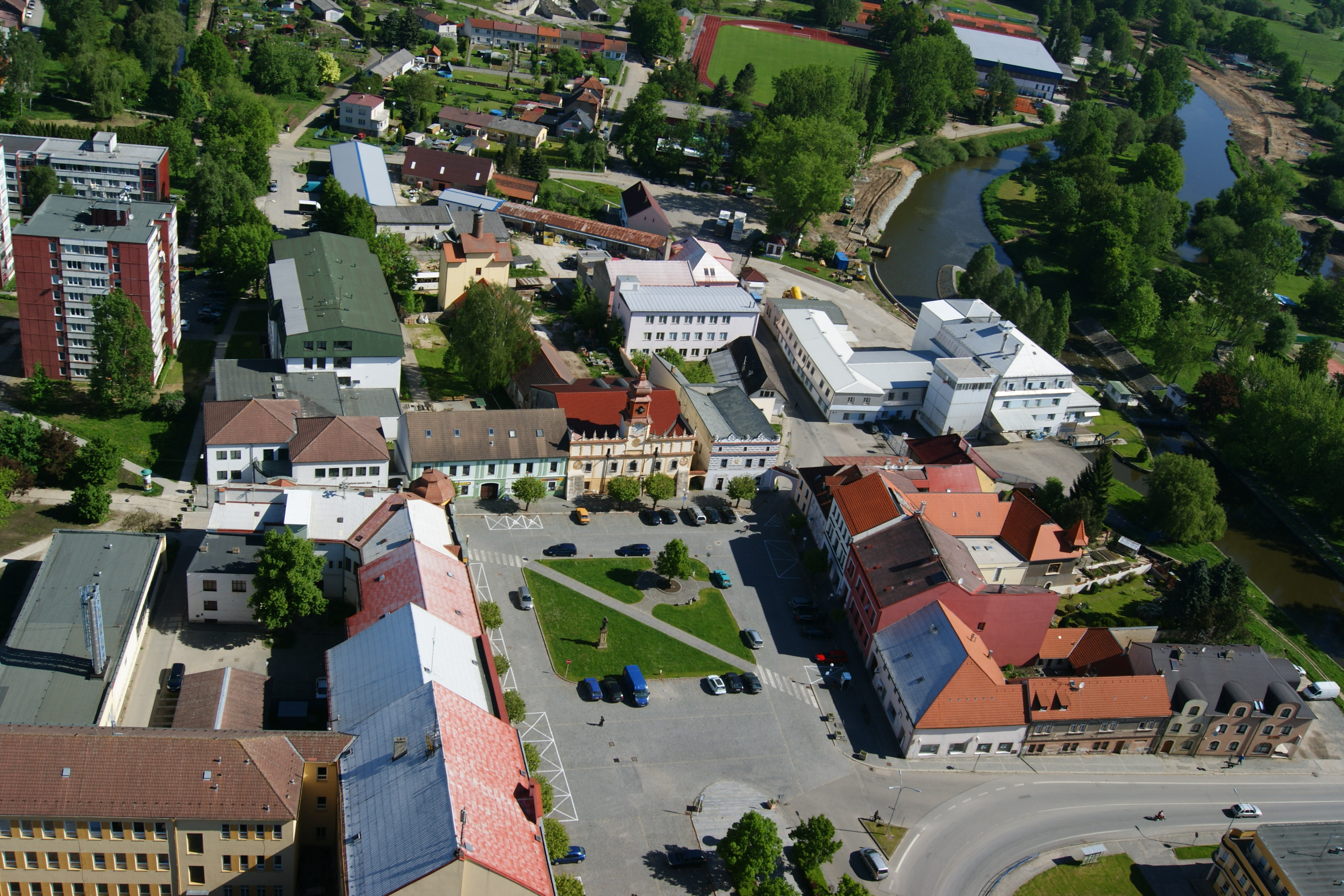
- Town square

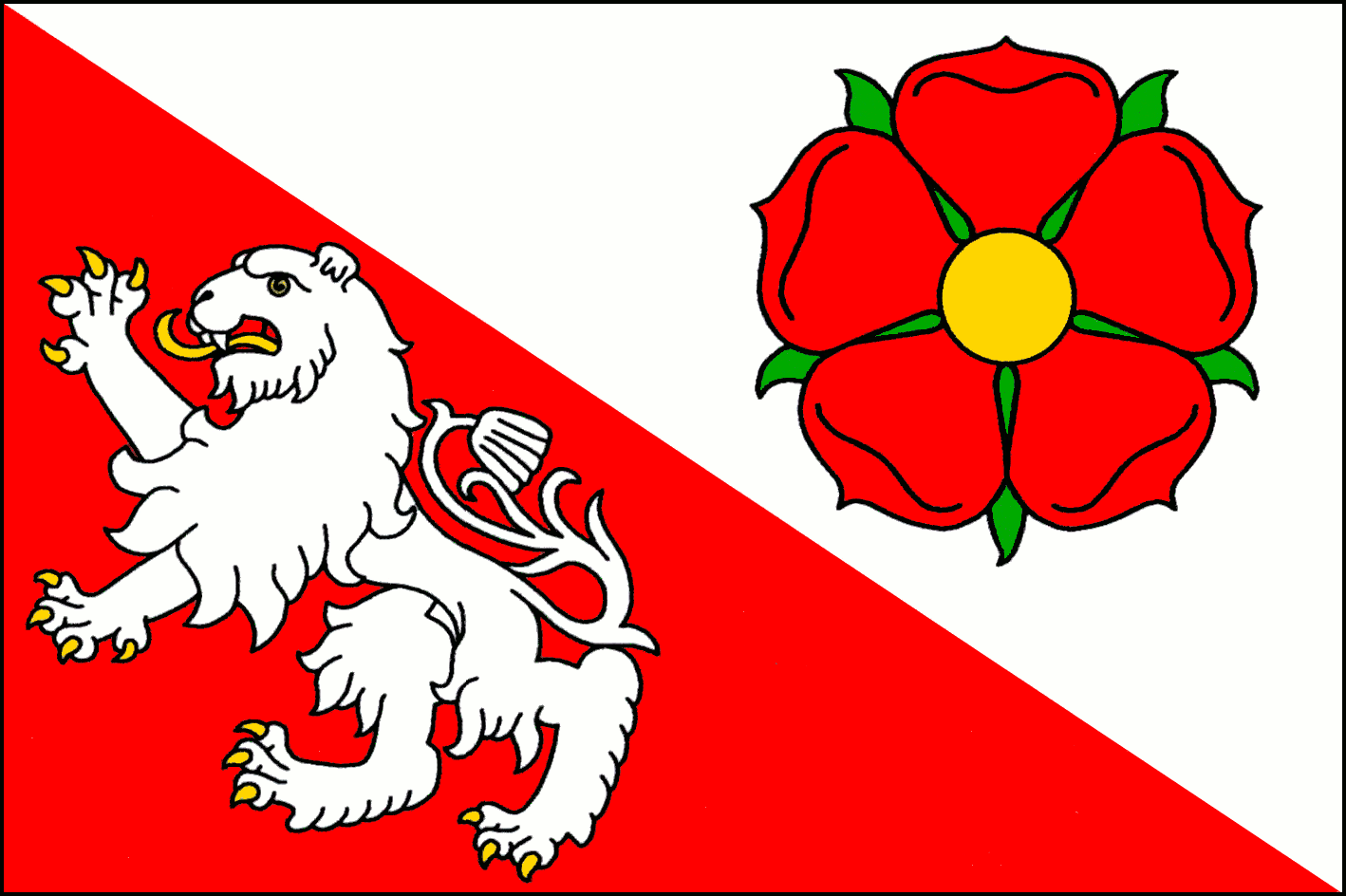
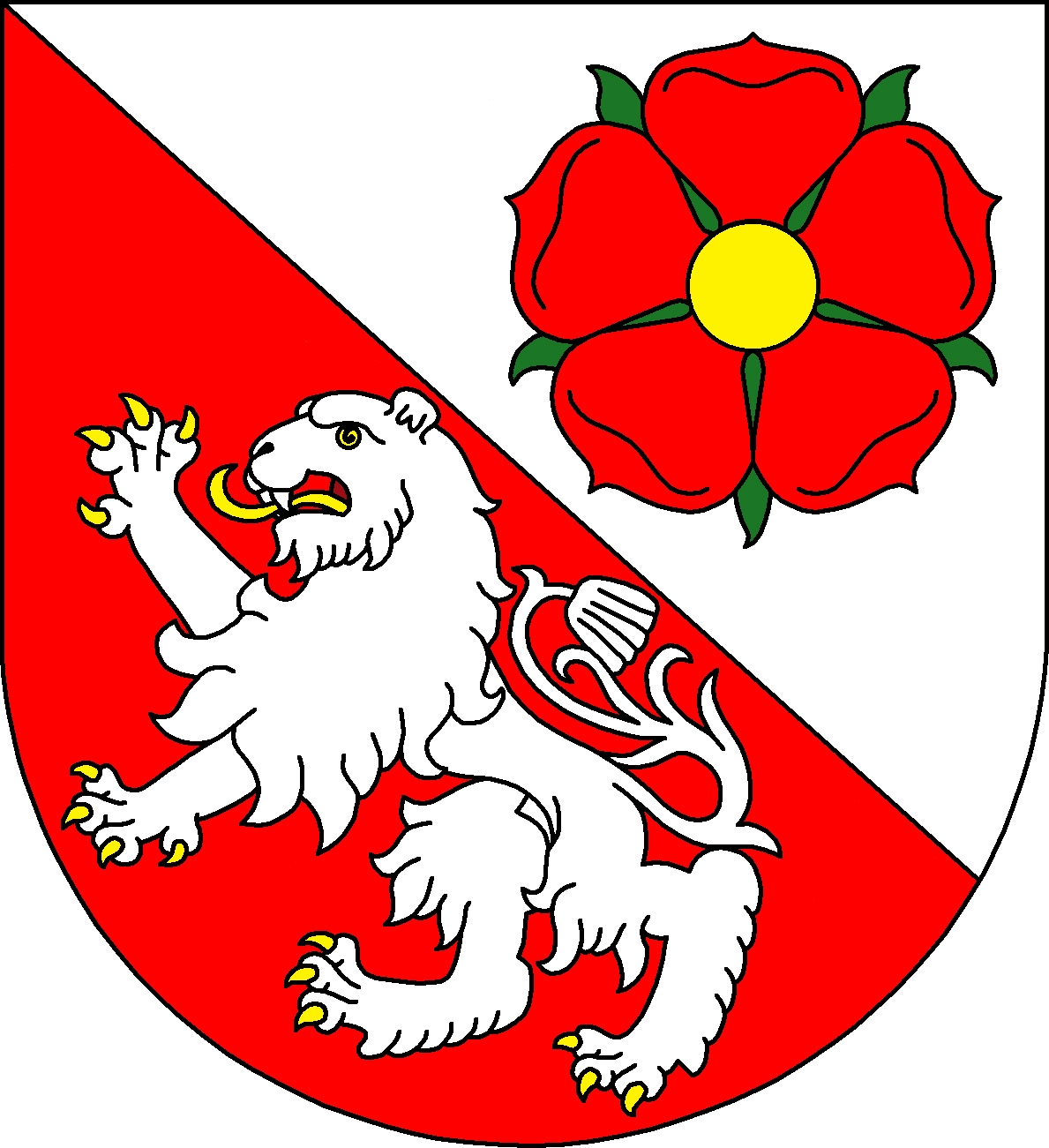
- Flag Coat of arms

- Location in the Czech Republic
- Coordinates: 49°11′12″N 14°41′56″E
- Country: Czech Republic
- Region: South Bohemian
- District: Tábor
- First mentioned: 1259

Government
  - Mayor: Vít Rada

Area
  - Total: 29.57 km^{2} (11.42 sq mi)
- Elevation: 407 m (1,335 ft)

Population (2026-01-01)
  - Total: 6,492
  - Density: 219.5/km^{2} (568.6/sq mi)
- Time zone: UTC+1 (CET)
  - Summer (DST): UTC+2 (CEST)
- Postal code: 391 81
- Website: www.veseli.cz

Veselí nad Lužnicí (Czech pronunciation: [ˈvɛsɛliː ˈnad luʒɲɪtsiː]; German: Wesseli an der Lainsitz) is a town in Tábor District in the South Bohemian Region of the Czech Republic. It has about 6,500 inhabitants. The town is located in the Třeboň Basin at the confluence of the Lužnice and Nežárka rivers.

== Administrative division ==
Veselí nad Lužnicí consists of three municipal parts (in brackets population according to the 2021 census):

- Veselí nad Lužnicí I (3,728)
- Veselí nad Lužnicí II (2,296)
- Horusice (187)

== Etymology ==
The word veselí means 'mirth', 'merriment' in Czech. It was a frequent name of newly founded settlements, which were given this name to ensure that its inhabitants would always be happy and joyful.

== Geography ==
Veselí nad Lužnicí is located about 25 kilometres (16 mi) south of Tábor and 27 km (17 mi) northeast of České Budějovice. It lies at the confluence of the Lužnice and Nežárka rivers.

Veselí nad Lužnicí is situated on the northern edge of the Třeboň Basin and is known for its fishponds and pine forests. There are five artificial lakes south of the town, used for recreational purposes; these were created between 1952 and 1986 by flooding former gravel and sand quarries. An educational trail runs around them.

Horusický rybník, the second largest fishpond in the country with an area of 415 ha (1,030 acres), lies southwest of the town. The southern part of the municipal territory lies in the Třeboňsko Protected Landscape Area, which was declared a UNESCO biosphere reserve.

== History ==
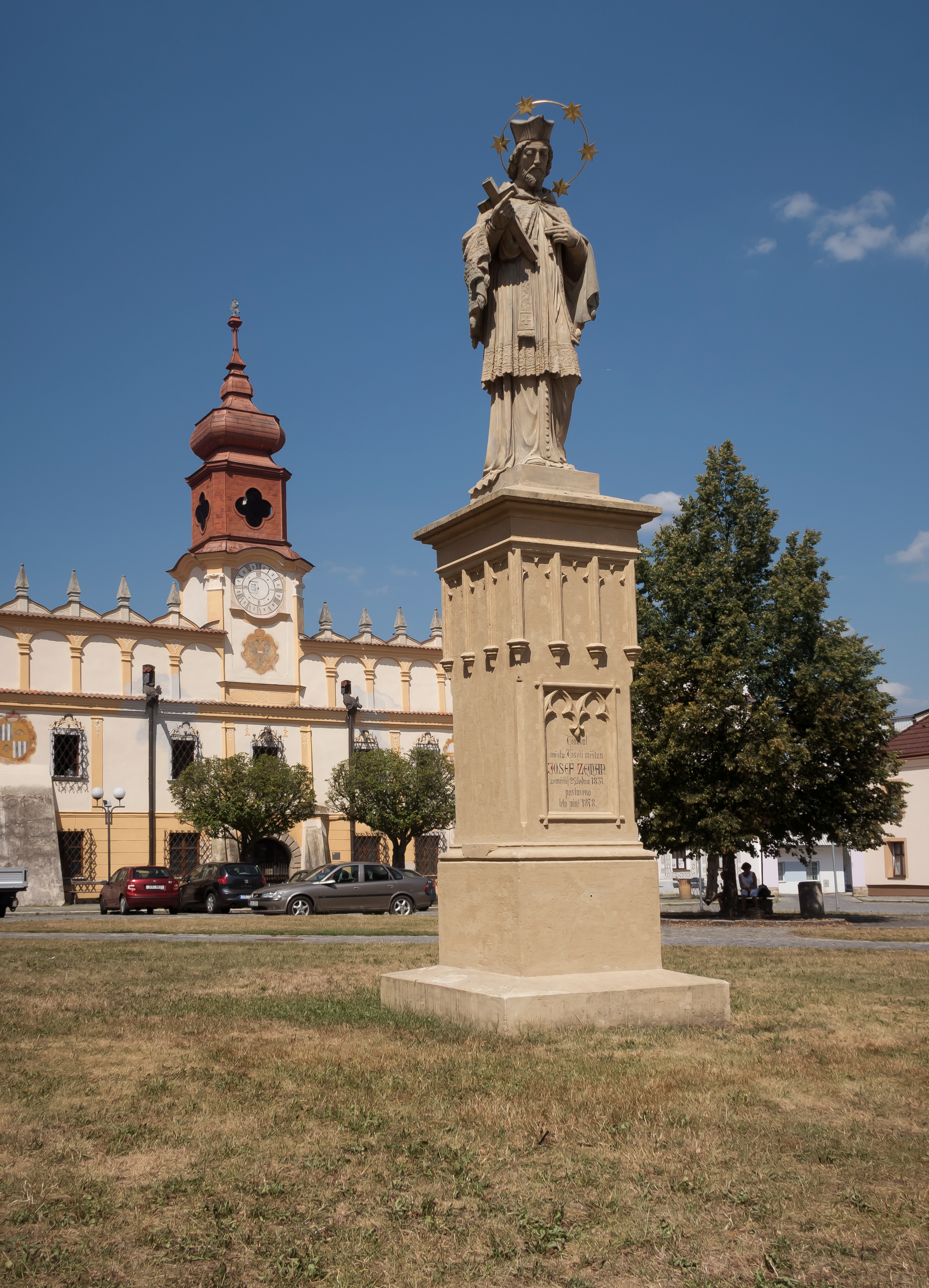
Statue of Saint John of Nepomuk in front of the town hall

The first written mention of Veselí is from 1259, when it was a hamlet and a redoubt on the salt road from Austria to Prague. King Charles IV gave it the status of a town in 1362. In the 15th century, the town saw many fires and was looted by the Hussites. It was Peter Vok of Rosenberg, a famous fishpond founder and supporter, who let the town grow again a hundred years later.

The Thirty Years' War (1618–1648) damaged the town badly again, with only 69 people remaining. New development came with the Schwarzenberg dynasty in the second half of the 17th century. Veselí stayed in their possession until the end of World War I in 1918.

It was originally two separate towns – Veselí nad Lužnicí and Mezimostí nad Nežárkou (a town since 1908). They were joined in 1943 to make one town under the present name.

== Demographics ==
Historical population

Year	Pop.	±%
1869	2,776	—
1880	2,835	+2.1%
1890	3,088	+8.9%
1900	3,623	+17.3%
1910	4,108	+13.4%

Year	Pop.	±%
1921	4,291	+4.5%
1930	4,588	+6.9%
1950	4,302	−6.2%
1961	4,985	+15.9%
1970	4,847	−2.8%

Year	Pop.	±%
1980	6,237	+28.7%
1991	6,450	+3.4%
2001	6,641	+3.0%
2011	6,386	−3.8%
2021	6,211	−2.7%

Source: Censuses

== Economy ==
The railway station is one of the largest local employers. The sand quarrying, concrete production and food industries are also long-established in the town.

== Transport ==
The D3 motorway (part of the European route E55) from České Budějovice to Tábor runs next to the town.

Veselí nad Lužnicí is an important railway junction. It lies on the railway lines Prague–České Budějovice, Prague–České Velenice, Brno–Plzeň and Veselí nad Lužnicí–Jindřichův Hradec.

== Sights ==
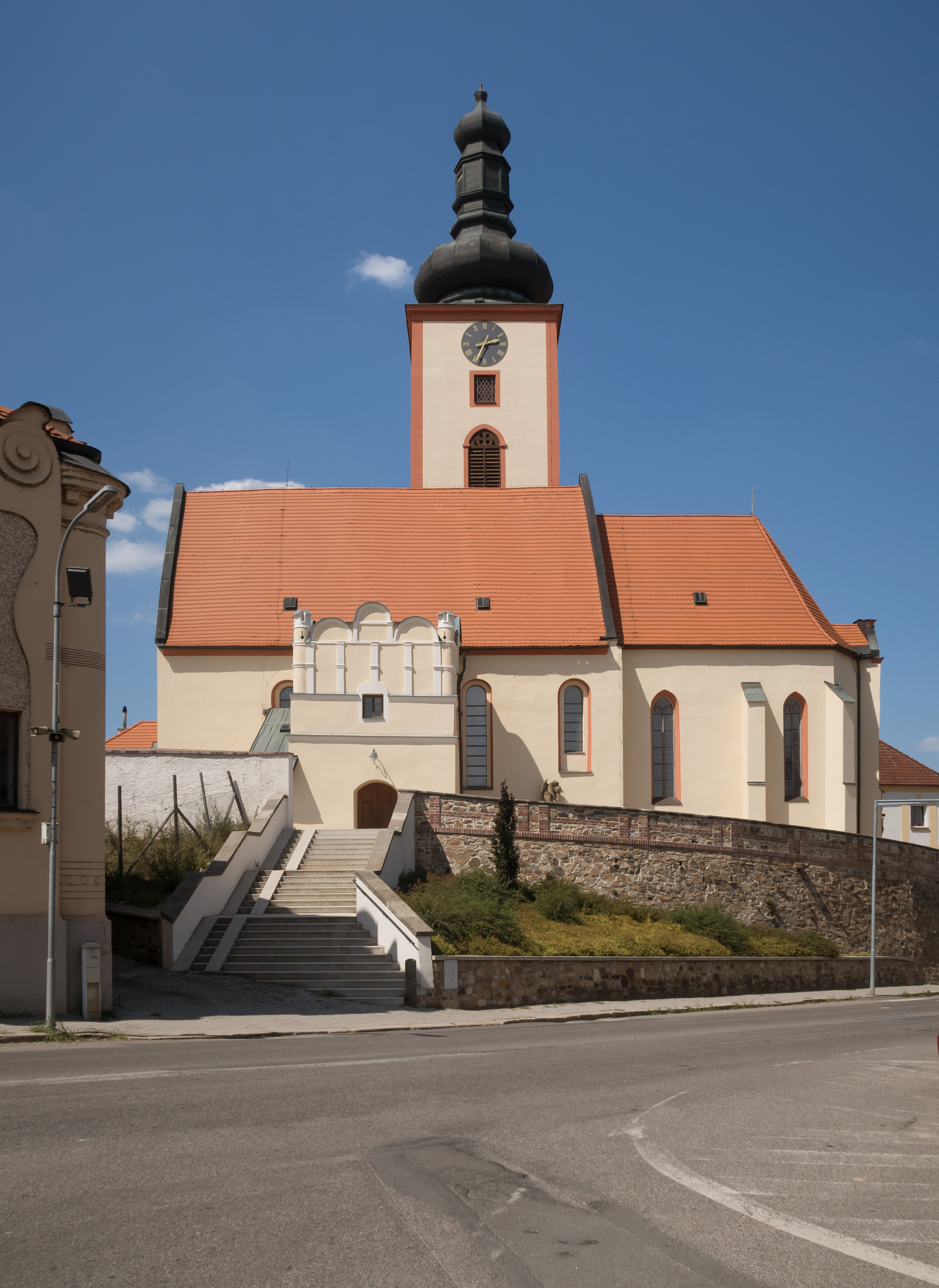
Church of the Exaltation of the Holy Cross

The Old Town Hall, built in the Renaissance style in 1616, is the main building on the square and together with the neighbouring museum, which was also built in 1616, forms an architectonic unit. The New Town Hall was built in 1897.

The Church of the Exaltation of the Holy Cross is the main landmark. Its existence was first mentioned in 1259 and is the oldest monument in the town. The Chapel of Saint Mark (1754) and the Chapel of Saint Florian in Mezimostí (1715) are other notable buildings.

== Notable people ==
- Karel Weis (1862–1944), composer, collector of folk songs and folklorist; worked here
- Karel Traxler (1866–1936), chess master; lived here
- Emil Hlobil (1901–1987), composer and music professor
- Lubomír Štrougal (1924–2023), politician and prime minister
- Saša Večtomov (1930–1989), cellist; buried here
- Vladimír Večtomov (1946–2015), guitarist

== Twin towns – sister cities ==
Veselí nad Lužnicí is twinned with:

- Diemtigen, Switzerland
- Yspertal, Austria

Veselí nad Lužnicí also cooperates with other Czech municipalities and municipal parts with Veselí in their names.
