= Grand Prix du Disque for Instrumental and Symphonic Music =

The Grand Prix du Disque for Instrumental and Symphonic Music is awarded by the Académie Charles Cros, L'Abbaye, 02570 Chézy sur Marne, France. Categories vary from year to year, and multiple awards may be given in the same year in the same exact category. Instrumental and Symphonic music may include solo & orchestra (concerto) or pure symphonic music. Other subcategories have included classical symphonic music, contemporary symphonic music and modern concerto.

Orchestras with more than one Grand Prix du Disque win in the category of symphonic music include the Berlin Philharmonic, London Symphony Orchestra, Vienna Philharmonic, Philharmonia Orchestra, Orchestre National de France, Berlin Radio Symphony Orchestra, Orchestre de la Suisse Romande, Chicago Symphony Orchestra, New York Philharmonic, San Francisco Symphony Orchestra and Cleveland Orchestra.

== Winners ==
The following is a partial list of winners:

1950

- Solo & Orchestra – Vivaldi The Four Seasons with Louis Kaufman as violinist

1951

- Symphonic Music – Beethoven Symphony No. 9 with Bayreuth Festival Orchestra and Choir under Wilhelm Furtwängler (Electrola)

1952

- Symphonic Music – Beethoven Symphony No. 5 & 8 with NBC Symphony Orchestra under Arturo Toscanini (RCA Victor)
- Symphonic Music – Berlioz Symphonie fantastique with San Francisco Symphony under Pierre Monteux (Le Voix)
- Solo & Orchestra – Tchaikovsky Violin Concerto with Jascha Heifetz and the Philharmonia Orchestra under Walter Susskind (RCA Victor)

1953

- Symphonic Music – Bartok Music for Strings, Percussion and Celesta with Philharmonia Orchestra under Herbert von Karajan (Columbia)
- Symphonic Music – Mussorgsky Tableaux D'une Exposition with the Concertgebouw Orchestra under Antal Doráti (Philips)
- Solo & Orchestra – Handel Oboe Concertos with Pierre Pierlot and Ensemble Orchestral de L'Oiseau-Lyre under Anthony Lewis (Les Disques de L'Oiselet)

1954

- Symphonic Music – Beethoven Symphony No. 3 with Berlin Philharmonic under Paul van Kempen (Philips)
- Symphonic Music – Berlioz Roméo et Juliette with Boston Symphony Orchestra under Charles Munch (RCA Victor)
- Solo & Orchestra – Berg Violin Concerto with Ivry Gitlis and Vienna Philharmonic under William Strickland

1955

- Symphonic Music – Debussy La Mer, Ibéria with Orchestre du Théatre des Champs-Elysées under D. E. Inghelbrecht (Ducretet-Thomson)
- Symphonic Music – Debussy Jeux, Epigraphes antiques with Orchestre de la Suisse Romande under Ernest Ansermet (Decca)
- Solo & Orchestra – Mozart Violin Concertos No. 3 & 4 with Arthur Grumiaux and Vienna Symphony Orchestra under Rudolf Moralt (Philips)

1956

- Symphonic Music – Mozart Symphony No. 36 with Columbia SO & Symphony No. 41 with New York Philharmonic under Bruno Walter (Philips)
- Solo & Orchestra – Dvořák Cello Concerto with Pierre Fournier and the Vienna Philharmonic under Rafael Kubelik (London)

1957

- Symphonic Music – Tchaikovksy Symphony No. 4 with Leningrad Philharmonic under Kurt Sanderling (DG)
- Symphonic Music – Saint-Seans Symphony No. 3 with Paris Conservatoire Orchestra under André Cluytens (Angel/EMI)
- Symphonic/Instrumental Music – Dances of Shakespeare's Times with the Boyd Neel String Orchestra under Thurston Dart
- Solo & Orchestra – Brahms Double Concerto for Violin and Cello with Isaac Stern and Leonard Rose, NYPO under Bruno Walter (Columbia)

1958

- Symphonic Music – Beethoven Symphonies 3, 4, 5 with Columbia Symphony Orchestra under Bruno Walter (Columbia)
- Symphonic Music – Dvorak New World Symphony with Orchestre National de France under Constantin Silvestri (Angel/EMI)
- Solo & Orchestra – Tchaikovsky Piano Concerto No. 1 Van Cliburn with Symphony-Orchestra under Kiril Kondrashin (RCA Victor)

1959

- Symphonic Music – Tchaikovsky Symphony No. 6 with L'Orchestre de la Suisse Romande under Ernest Ansermet
- Symphonic Music – Bartók Concerto for Orchestra with Radio-Symphonie-Orchester Berlin with Ferenc Fricsay (DG)
- Symphonic/Instrumental Music – Jean-Baptiste Lully et al. Les Lullistes with the Ensemble Orchestral de l’Oiseau-Lyre under Louis de Froment (L'Oiseau-Lyre, Decca)

1960

- Symphonic Music – Mussorgsky, Ravel Pictures At An Exhibition, Sviatoslav Richter; The Cleveland Orchestra under George Szell (Columbia)
- Symphonic Music – Martinů Symphony Nos 5 & 6, Memorial to Lidice with Czech Philharmonic Orchestra under Karel Ančerl
- Solo & Orchestra – Rachmoninoff Piano Concerto No. 2 with Sviatoslav Richter under Stanislaw Wislocki (DG)
- Solo & Orchestra – Brahms Violin Concerto with Henryk Szeryng and London Symphony Orchestra under Pierre Monteux (RCA Victor)
- Leo Janáek and Debussy violin sonatas with Josef Suk

1961

- Symphonic Music – Brahms 4 Symphonies with the Columbia Symphony Orchestra under Bruno Walter (Columbia)
- Symphonic Music – Beethoven Symphony No. 9, Eroica Variations with Shura Cherkassky and Orchestre de la Société des Concerts du Conservatoire under Carl Schuricht (Pathe Marconi)
- Solo & Orchestra – Béla Bartók Piano Concertos No. 2 & 3 with Géza Anda and Berlin Radio Symphony Orchestra under Ferenc Fricsay (DG)
- Solo & Orchestra – Handel Harp Concertos with Osian Ellis and Philomusica of London under Granville Jones (L'Oiseau-Lyre, Decca)
- César Franck complete organ work world-premiere with Jeanne Demessieux (London)

1962

- Symphonic Music – Mendelssohn Symphony No. 4 & 5 with BPSO under Lorin Maazel (DG)
- Symphonic Music – Bach Overtures No. 1 & 4 with Münchener Bach-Orchester under Karl Richter (Archiv)
- Solo & Orchestra – Dvořák Cello Concerto with Pierre Fournier and Berlin Philharmonic under George Szell (DG)
- Solo & Orchestra – Liszt Piano Concerto No. 1 & 2 with Sviatoslav Richter and London Symphony Orchestra under Kyrill Kondrashin (Philips)
- Solo & Orchestra – Weber, Spohr Clarinet Concertos with Gesave de Peyer and London Symphony Orchestra under Sir Colin Davis (L'Oiseau-Lyre, Decca)

1963

- Symphonic Music Malek Sigma with Orchestre Symphonique du Südwestfunk, Baden Baden under Ernest Bour (Philips)
- Solo & Orchestra – Mozart Piano Concertos No. 17 & No. 21, Géza Anda with the Mozarteum Orchester Salzburg (DG)
- Solo & Orchestra – Handel 16 Organ Concertos Marie-Claire Alain and Orchestre De Chambre Jean-François Paillard under Jean-François Paillard (Erato)

1964

- Symphonic Music – Beethoven 9 Symphonies with Berlin Philharmonic under Herbert von Karajan (DG)
- Symphonic Music – Debussy Images For Orchestra, Fragments Symphoniques with London Symphony Orchestra under Pierre Monteux (Philips)
- Solo & Orchestra – Beethoven Triple Concerto with Geza Anda, Wolfgang Schneiderhan, Pierre Fournier and Radio-Symphonie-Orchester Berlin under Ferenc Fricsay (DG)

1965

- Symphonic Music – Berlioz Symphonie Fantastique with NDR Symphony Orchestra under Pierre Monteux (Concert Hall)
- Symphnoic Music – Brahms Four Symphonies with Berlin Philharmonic under Herbert von Karajan (DG)
- Solo & Orchestra – Sibelius Violin Concerto with Christian Ferras & Berlin Philharmonic under Karajan (DG)

1966

- Symphonic Music – Mozart Symphony 35 & 39 with Cleveland Orchestra under George Szell
- Symphonic Music – Roussel Symphonies No. 3 & 4 with Orchestra del'assocation des Concerts Lamoureux under Charles Munch
- Solo & Orchestra – Brahms Piano Concerto No. 1 with Bruno Leonardo Gelber and Munich Philharmonic Orchestra under F. P. Decker (Pathe-Marconi)
- Solo & Orchestra – Chopin Piano Concerto No. 2 & Bach Piano Concerto BMV 1052 with V. Ashkenazy and London Symphony Orchestra under D. Zinman (Decca)
- Solo & Orchestra – Bruch Violin Concerto with Josef Suk and Czech Philharmonic Orchestra under Karel Ancerl

1967

- Symphonic Music – Mahler Symphony No. 2 with London Symphony Orchestra, Heather Harper and Helen Watts under Georg Solti (Decca)
- Symphonic Music – Works by Koechlin, Pierre Boulez and Olivier Messiaen with BBC Symphony Orchestra under Antal Dorati and Pierre Boulez (La Voix)
- Symphonic Music – Varese 'Arcana' and Martin Concerto for Seven Instruments with CSO under Jean Martinon (RCA)
- Symphonic Music – Brahms Symphony No. 4 with Bavarian Radio Symphony Orchestra under Carl Schuricht (Concert Hall)
- Soloist & Orchestra – Poulenc and Aubade Piano Concertos with Gabriel Tacchino and Societe des Concerts du Conservatoire under Georges Pretre (La Voix)
- Soloist & Orchestra – Handel Organ Concertos with Edouard Muller and Schola Cantorum Basiliensis under August Wenzinger
- Soloist & Orchestra – Mozart Violin Concerto No. 5 & No. 7 with Henryk Szeryng and New Philharmonia Orchestra under Alexander Gibson (Philips)

1968

- Integral Recording – Bruckner 9 Symphonies with Berlin Philharmonic under Eugen Jochum (DG)
- Classical Symphonic Music – Schubert Symphony No. 5 with BPSO under Karl Böhm (DG)
- Contemporary Symphonic Music – Vivaldi Oboe Concerto with Pierre Pierlot under Claudio Scimone (Erato)
- Contemporary Symphonic Music – Haydn & Bocherini Cello Concertos with Jacqueline du Pre, English Chamber Orchestra under Daniel Barenboim (Voix)
- Modern Concerto – Berg violin concerto with Josef Suk and Czech Symphony Orchestra
- Modern Concerto – Prokofiev Piano Concerto No. 3 & Ravel Piano Concerto with Martha Argerich and Berlin Philharmonic under Claudio Abbado (DG)

1969

- Symphonic Music – Prokofiev Symphony No. 7 with the Moscow Radio Symphony Orchestra under Gennadi Rozhdestvensky (Angel)
- Solo & Orchestra – Beethoven 5 Piano Concertos, Choir Fantasy with Daniel Barenboim and New Philharmonia Orchestra under Otto Klemperer (EMI)
- Solo & Orchestra – Béla Bartók's Violin Concerto, Rumanian Dance with Dénes Kovács and Budapest Philharmonic Orchestra under András Kórodi (Hungaroton)

1970

- Symphonic Music – Mozart Symphonies 21–24, Berlin Philharmonic under Karl Böhm (DG)
- Solo & Orchestra – Beethoven Triple Concerto with David Oistrakh, Mstislav Rostropovich, Sviatoslav Richter and Berlin Philharmonic under Herbert von Karajan (EMI)
- Solo & Orchestra – Dvořák Cello Concerto, Tchaikovsky Rococo Varations with Mstislav Rostropovitch and Berlin Philharmonic under Herbert von Karajan (DG)

1971

- Symphonic Music – Mahler Symphony No. 3 and London Symphony Orchestra under Jascha Horenstein (Unicorn)
- Solo & Orchestra – Vladimir Vlasov Concert No. 1 with Mstislav Rostropovich and Moscow Radio Orchestra (Angel)
- Solo & Orchestra – Saint-Saens Five Piano Concertos with Aldo Ciccolini and Orchestre de Paris under Serge Baudo (Seraphim)

1972

- Solo & Orchestra – Bartok Piano Concertos No. 1 & 2 with Zoltán Kocsis and Budapest Symphony Orchestra under György Lehel (Hungaroton)

1973

- Solo & Orchestra – Beethoven Violin Concerto with David Oistrakh and Orchestre National De France under André Cluytens (EMI)
- Solo & Orchestra – Mozart Violin Concertos No. 3 & 4 with Josef Suk and Prague Symphony Orchestra

1974

- Solo & Orchestra – Beethoven Complete Piano Concertos with Vladimir Ashkenazy and Chicago Symphony Orchestra under Georg Solti (Decca)

1977

- Symphonic Work – Hadyn Symphony 100 & 103 with Academy of St Martin in the Fields under Neville Marriner (Philips)

1978

- Symphonic Music – Mahler Symphony No. 9 with the Chicago Symphony Orchestra under Carlo Maria Giulini (DG)
- Symphonic Music – Gershwin An American in Paris with San Francisco Symphony under Seiji Ozawa (DG)
- Martinu Violin Concerto with Josef Suk and Chzech Philharmonic under Václav Neumann

1979

- Solo & Orchestra – Mozart Violin Concerts No. 3 & 5 with Anne-Sophie Mutter and Berlin Philharmonic under Herbert von Karajan (DG)
- Scarlatti 12 Concerti Grossi with Academy of St Martin in the Fields under Neville Marriner (Philips)

1981

- Solo & Orchestra – Mendelssohn/Bruch Violin Concerto with Shlomo Mintz and CSO under Claudio Abbado (DG)

1985

- Rachmaninoff Piano Sonata No. 2 with Hélène Grimaud

1987

- Bach Violin Concertos with Itzhak Perlman, Pinchas Zukerman and English Chamber Orchestra under Daniel Barenboim (EMI)

1989

- Mozart's Serenades and Divermenti, Sandor Vegh with Camerata Acadmeica of Salzburg (Capriccio)

1990

- Mozart's Piano Sonatas K. 310, K. 333 and K. 545, Maria João Pires (DG)

1991

- Debussy, Ravel, and Henri Dutilleux string quartets with the New World String Quartet

1995

- Chopin Piano Concerto no. 2 and 24 Préludes op. 28 with Maria João Pires and Royal Philharmonic Orchestra under André Prévin (DG)

1996

- Bach's Partita no. 1, French Suite no. 2 and English Suite no. 3 with Maria Joao Pires as pianist (DG)

1997

- Chopin Complete Nocturnes with Maria Joao Pires (DG)
- Brahms's Piano Trios with Mario Joao Pires, Augustin Dumay and Jian Wang (DG)

2002

- Henri Dutilleux Cello and Violin Concertos with Truls Mørk, R. Capuçon and the Orchestre Philharmonique de Radio France under Myung-whun Chung

2004

- Poulenc Concerto for Two Pianos and Concerto for Piano with Éric Le Sage and Frank Braley and the Philharmonic Orchestra of Liège under Stéphane Denève

2005

- Liszt orchestra works with Rian Waul as pianist, and the Ensemble Anima Eterna under Jos van Immerseel
- Berio and Feldman: Voix d'Alto with Christophe Desjardins, the Collegium Novum Zürich and the Basler Madrigalisten under J. Nott

2009

- Symphonic Music – Charles Koechlin Les Bandar-log & Offrande musicale sur le nom de BACH with Stuttgart Radio Symphony Orchestra under Heinz Holliger (Hännsler)

2013

- Liszt's Malédiction with Zoltán Fejérvári and Budapest Chamber Symphony

2018

- Bartók Violin Concerto No. 1 and Enescu Octet with Vilde Frang

== See also ==
Grand Prix du Disque
