= Wihan Quartet =

Czech string quartet

The Wihan Quartet (Czech: Wihanovo kvarteto) is a Czech string quartet currently in residence at the Trinity College of Music, London. The quartet was founded at the Prague Academy of Musical Arts in 1985 by Leoš Čepický (violin), Jan Schulmeister (violin), Jiří Žigmund (viola) and Aleš Kaspřík (cello). The group's teacher was Antonín Kohout of the Smetana Quartet and it took its name of Hanuš Wihan (1855–1920), cellist and spiritus rector of the Bohemian Quartet.

The quartet won the Prague Spring International Music Competition (1988), the chamber music competition at Trapani, Sicily (1990), and the London International String Quartet Competition (1991). Since then it has toured extensively, including appearances at major festivals in Europe and the Far East, several tours to the United States, Japan, Australia, and New Zealand. The group has drawn particular acclaim for their performances and recordings of the works of Dvořák and Janáček. They have also had success with the Beethoven quartets, all of which they have recorded.
