= Lubná (Rakovník District) =

- Municipality
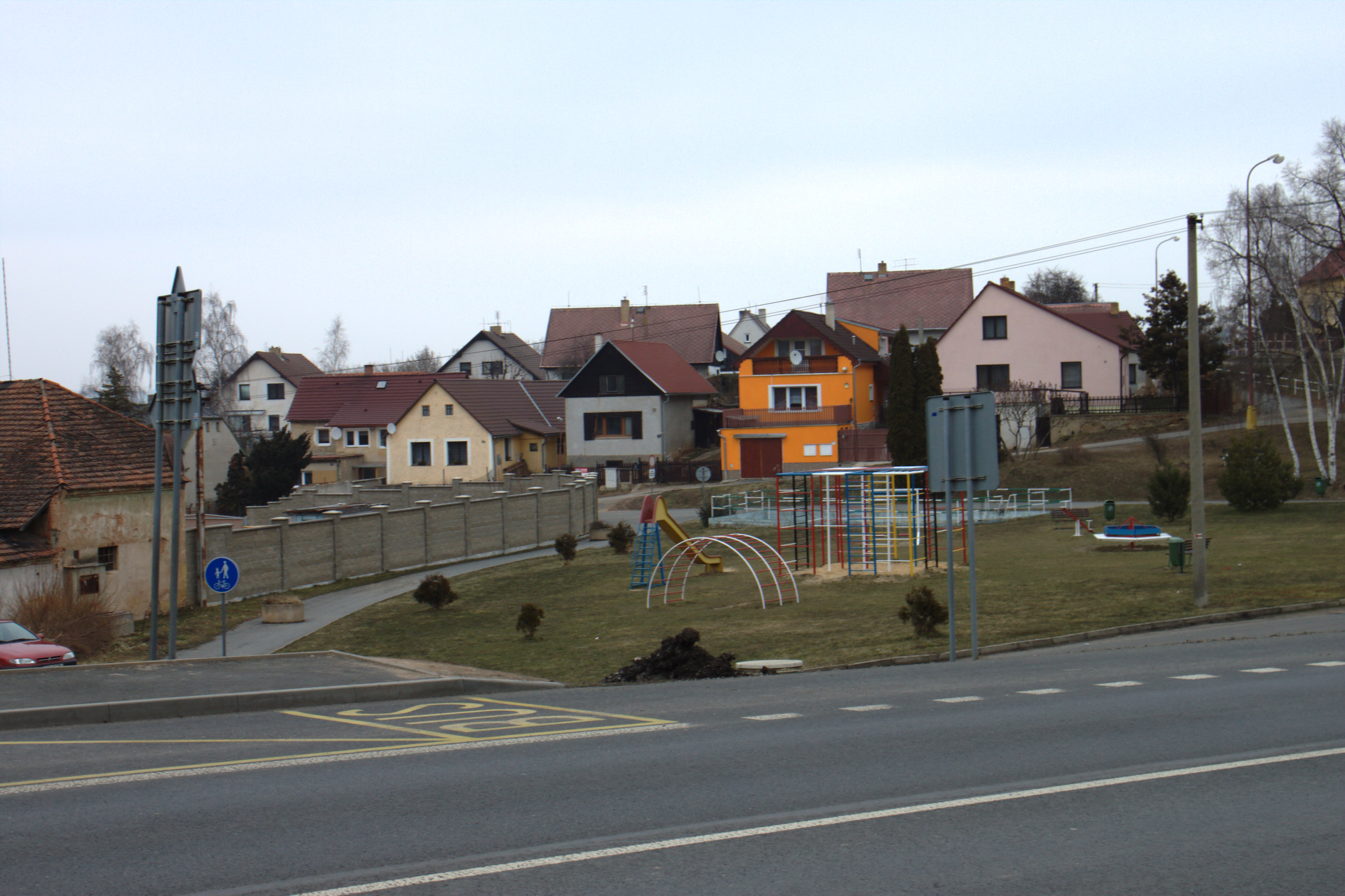
- Centre of Lubná

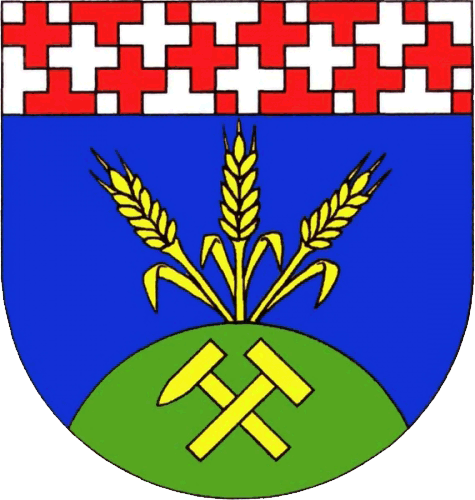
- Flag Coat of arms

- Location in the Czech Republic
- Coordinates: 50°4′37″N 13°42′3″E
- Country: Czech Republic
- Region: Central Bohemian
- District: Rakovník
- First mentioned: 1057

Area
  - Total: 8.75 km^{2} (3.38 sq mi)
- Elevation: 382 m (1,253 ft)

Population (2026-01-01)
  - Total: 1,119
  - Density: 128/km^{2} (331/sq mi)
- Time zone: UTC+1 (CET)
  - Summer (DST): UTC+2 (CEST)
- Postal code: 270 36
- Website: www.obec-lubna.cz

Lubná is a municipality and village in Rakovník District in the Central Bohemian Region of the Czech Republic. It has about 1,100 inhabitants.

== Etymology ==
The name Lubná is derived from the Old Czech word lub, i.e. 'bark'. Lubná was either originally the name of a local brook into which the bark fell, or the name was derived from the houses in the village, which were covered with bark.

== Geography ==
Lubná is located about 3 kilometres (2 mi) southwest of Rakovník and 46 km (29 mi) west of Prague. It lies mostly in the Rakovník Uplands, only the southern part of the municipal territory extends into the Plasy Uplands. The highest point is at 480 m (1,575 ft) above sea level.

== History ==
The first written mention of Lubná is from 1057. The next one is from 1315, when the village was part of the Křivoklát estate. During the Thirty Years' War, the village lost all its inhabitants and was only slowly repopulated. In 1821, hard coal mining began in Lubná, which led to the development of the village. Later, shale was also mined.

== Demographics ==
Historical population

Year	Pop.	±%
1869	596	—
1880	771	+29.4%
1890	691	−10.4%
1900	685	−0.9%
1910	742	+8.3%

Year	Pop.	±%
1921	746	+0.5%
1930	856	+14.7%
1950	703	−17.9%
1961	823	+17.1%
1970	715	−13.1%

Year	Pop.	±%
1980	629	−12.0%
1991	686	+9.1%
2001	725	+5.7%
2011	1,038	+43.2%
2021	1,027	−1.1%

Source: Censuses

== Transport ==
Lubná is located on the railway line Prague–Kralovice via Rakovník. The line is only in operation during the summer tourist season on weekends and historic trains run on it.

== Sights ==
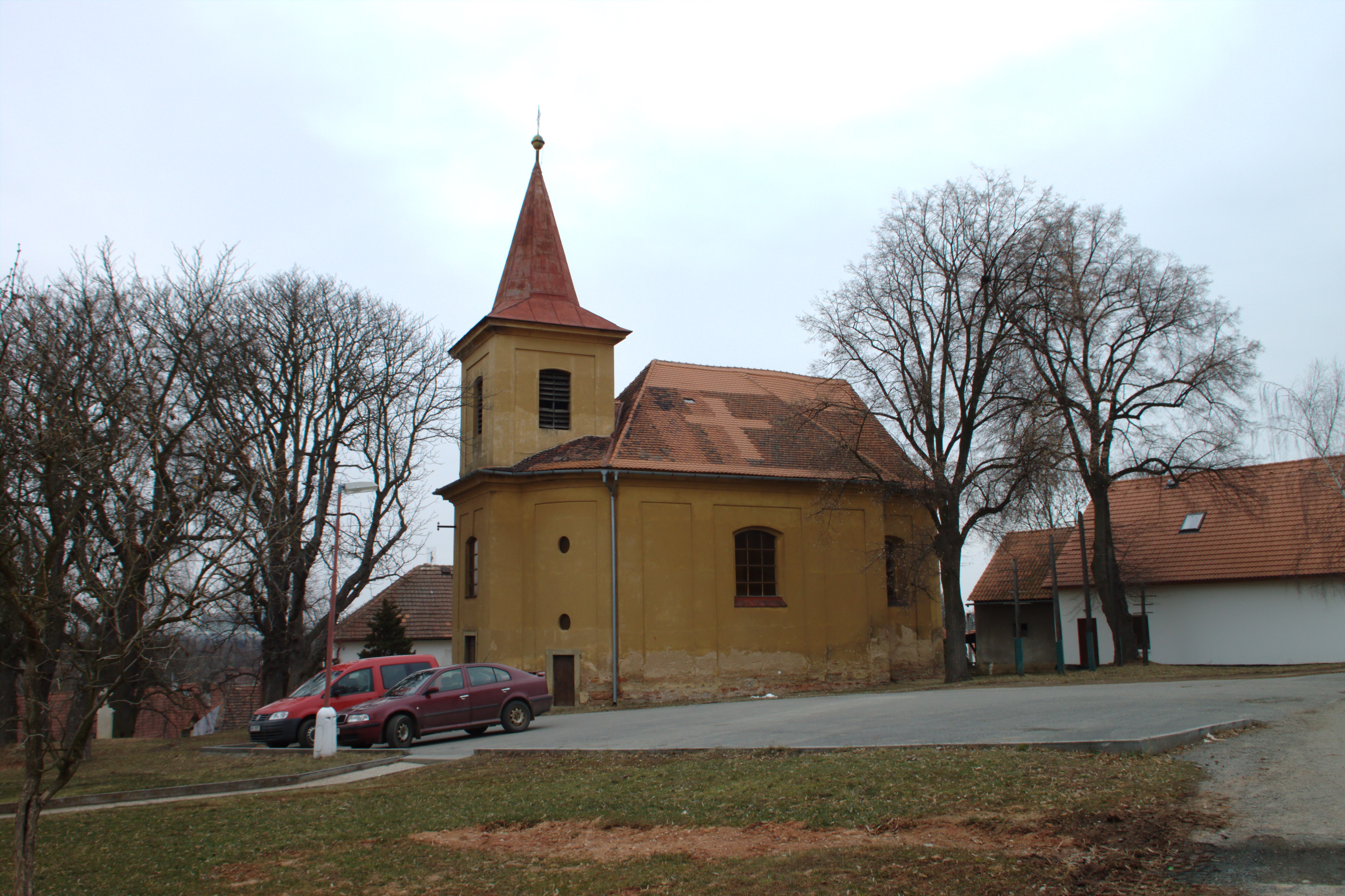
Church of Saint George

The main landmark of Lubná is the Church of Saint George. It was built in the Baroque style in 1732, on the site of an old Gothic church from the 14th century.

== Archaeology ==
The Lubná municipality includes several archaeological sites with discoveries of Upper Paleolithic artifacts such as reindeer hunter camps. Dated to approximately 25,000–27,500 years ago, these sites are considered a rare example of Late Gravettian settlement in Bohemia. The sites have yielded thousands of artifacts, primarily stone tools made from flint such as burins, tools for processing reindeer hides, and, in some cases, hearths. The first site was discovered by Jan Kušta in 1890, marking it as the first Paleolithic site excavated in Bohemia.

== Notable people ==
- Antonín Kohout (1919–2013), cellist
