= Suk Chamber Orchestra =

Classical chamber orchestra named after the composer Josef Suk

The Suk Chamber Orchestra (Czech: Sukův komorní orchestr) is a classical chamber orchestra named after the composer Josef Suk.

It was founded by the violinist Josef Suk in 1974, on the centenary of his grandfather, the composer Josef Suk. The orchestra currently serves as resident orchestra at the W.A. Mozart Festival. It has appeared at other festivals, including the Prague Spring Festival. It is also winner of the Antonín Dvořák World Award for its promotion of Czech music.
