= Pražák Quartet =

Czech string quartet established in 1974

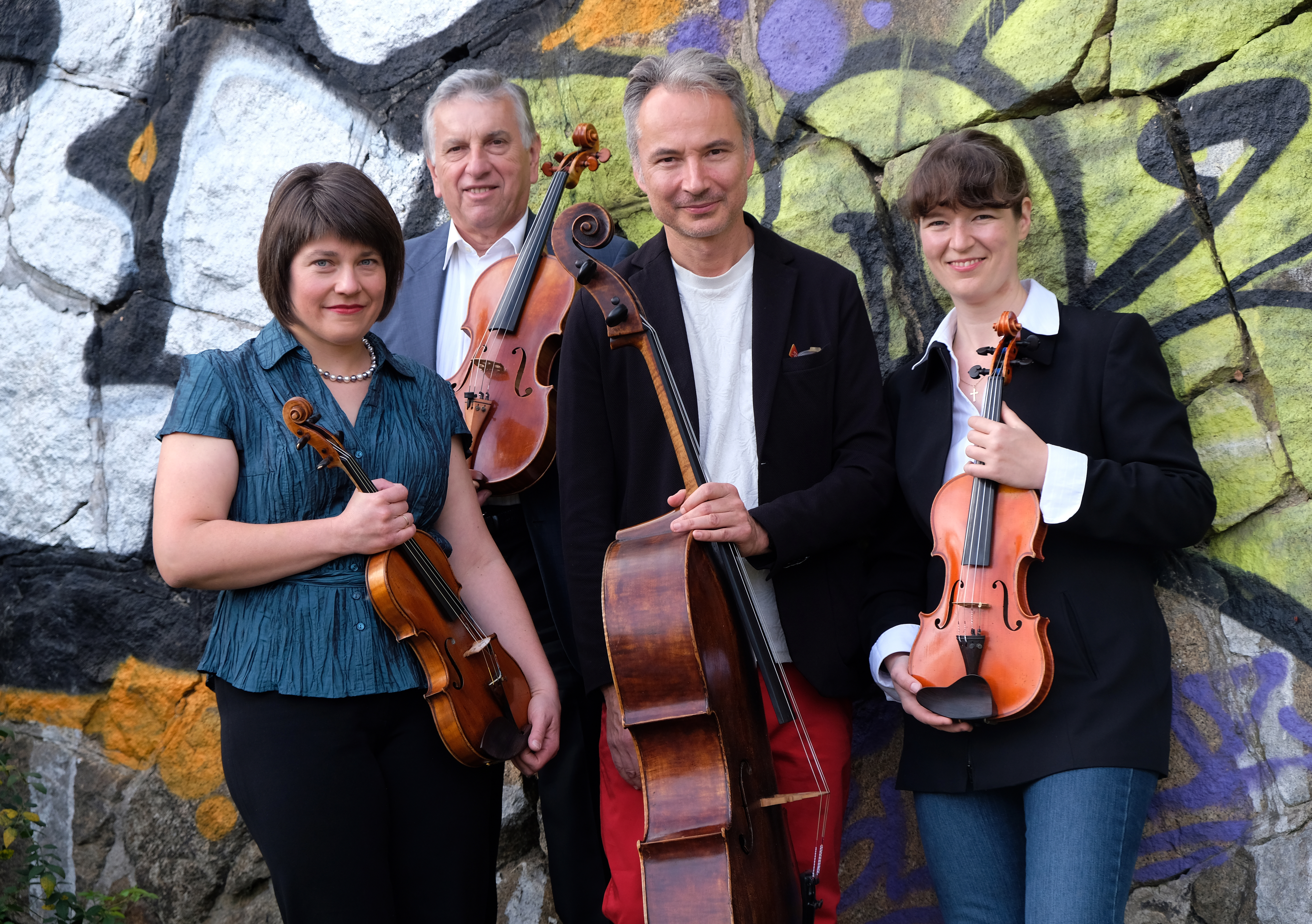
Pražák Quartet in 2021. From left: Jana Vonášková, Josef Klusoň, Pavel Jonáš Krejčí, Marie Magdalena Fuxová

The Pražák Quartet (in Czech: Pražákovo kvarteto) is a Czech string quartet established in 1974. It is one of the Czech Republic's premiere chamber ensembles. It was founded while its members were still students at Prague Conservatory (1974–1978). The quartet was awarded First Prize at the Evian International Competition in 1978 and the Prague Spring Festival Prize in 1979 with second places not being awarded at both the competitions to indicate the difference in level.

== Members ==
- First violin:
  - 1974-2010: Václav Remeš
  - 2010-2015: Pavel Hůla
  - Since 2015: Jana Vonášková
- Second violin:
  - 1974-2021: Vlastimil Holek
  - Since 2021: Marie Magdalena Fuxová
- Viola: Josef Klusoň
- Cello:
  - 1974-1986: Josef Pražák
  - 1986-2021: Michal Kaňka
  - Since 2021: Pavel Jonáš Krejčí

== Recordings ==
The Prazak Quartet has made more than 60 recordings during its long history, including some of the most important works in the string quartet and chamber music literature. They record for Praga Digitals. A partial discography includes:

- Ludwig van Beethoven - String Quartet op. 18, no. 1, 4, 5
- Ludwig van Beethoven - String Quartet op. 18, no. 2, 3, 6
- Ludwig van Beethoven - Quartets op. 59 Razumovsky
- Ludwig van Beethoven - String Quartet op. 74 and 95
- Ludwig van Beethoven - String Quartet op. 127 and 131
- Ludwig van Beethoven - String Quartet op. 132 and 135
- Alban Berg / Anton Webern - String Quartets
- Anton Webern - String Quartet, Op. 28 (1938)
- Johannes Brahms - String Quartet No. 3 in B flat major, Op. 67, Piano Quintet in F minor, Op. 34
- Johannes Brahms - String Quartet no 1 Op. 51/1, Clarinet Quintet Op. 115
- Johannes Brahms - String Quartet no 2 in A minor, Op.51, String Quintet no 2 in G major Op. 111
- Anton Bruckner - String Quintet with viola, Wolfgang Amadeus Mozart - String Quintet with viola K. 516, Jan Talich : viola
- Antonín Dvořák - String Quartet no 10 Op. 51 / B. 92 "Slavonic", String Quartet no 13 Op. 106 / B.192
- Antonín Dvořák - String Quartet no 11 in C Op. 61 / B. 121, Cypresses (12) B. 152 - complete cycle for String Quartet
- Antonín Dvořák - String Quartet no 12 in F major, Op. 96 / B 179 "The American", Terzetto in C major, Op. 74 / B 148, Bagatelles, Op. 47 / B 79
- Antonín Dvořák - String Quartet no 14 Op. 105 / B. 193;String Quartet no 12 Op. 96 / B. 179 "The American"
- Antonín Dvořák - Piano Quintet in A Op. 5 / B. 28 (1875);Piano Quintet in A Op. 81 / B.155 (1887), Ivan Klansky - piano
- Leoš Janáček - Complete String Quartets (both recorded twice)
- Arnold Schönberg - String Quartet no 1 in D minor Op. 7, String Quartet no 2 in F sharp minor Op. 10 with soprano, Christine Whittlesey, soprano
- Josef Haydn - "Erdödy" Quartets Op.76 Nos 1-3 - Vol.1
- Josef Haydn - "Erdödy" Quartets Op.76 Nos 4-6 - Vol.2
- Josef Haydn - The Last Three String Quartets Op. 77, Op.103
- Dmitri Shostakovich - String Quartets Opp.108, 110 / Piano Quintet, Op. 57 - Evgeni Koroliov: piano
