= Suk Trio =

Czech piano trio

The Suk Trio was a Czech piano trio founded in 1951 and disbanded in 1990. They made their debut on March 5 at the Rudolfinum Hall in Prague with Josef Suk (violin), Jiří Hubička (piano) and Saša Večtomov (cello). The permanent member of the ensemble was Josef Suk, the grandson of the composer and namesake of the ensemble.

The pianist that played the longest with the group was Jan Panenka, and the principal cellist was Josef Chuchro.

In 1958 they recorded Dumky by Antonín Dvořák for German label Deutsche Grammophon, the first stereophonic recording in the history of the label. The trio performed most of the great piano trios, touring abroad and recording extensively. It received many awards, including the Grand Prix du Disque. Among their notable recordings is one of the Mendelssohn Piano Trio No. 1 which has been re-released on CD by Supraphon.

The trio performed in Africa, Europe, Japan, USA, Australia etc.

One of the last concerts took place on 20 May 1990 in Prague, the programme comprised also a composition of Rafael Kubelík (soon after his return from exile). The performance occurred with the line-up Suk–Panenka–Chuchro.

== Selected recordings ==
- Beethoven, Schubert – Piano Trios CD. Supraphon, Prague. SU 3959-2
