= Jaroslav Kocian =

Czech violinist, composer and educator (1883–1950)

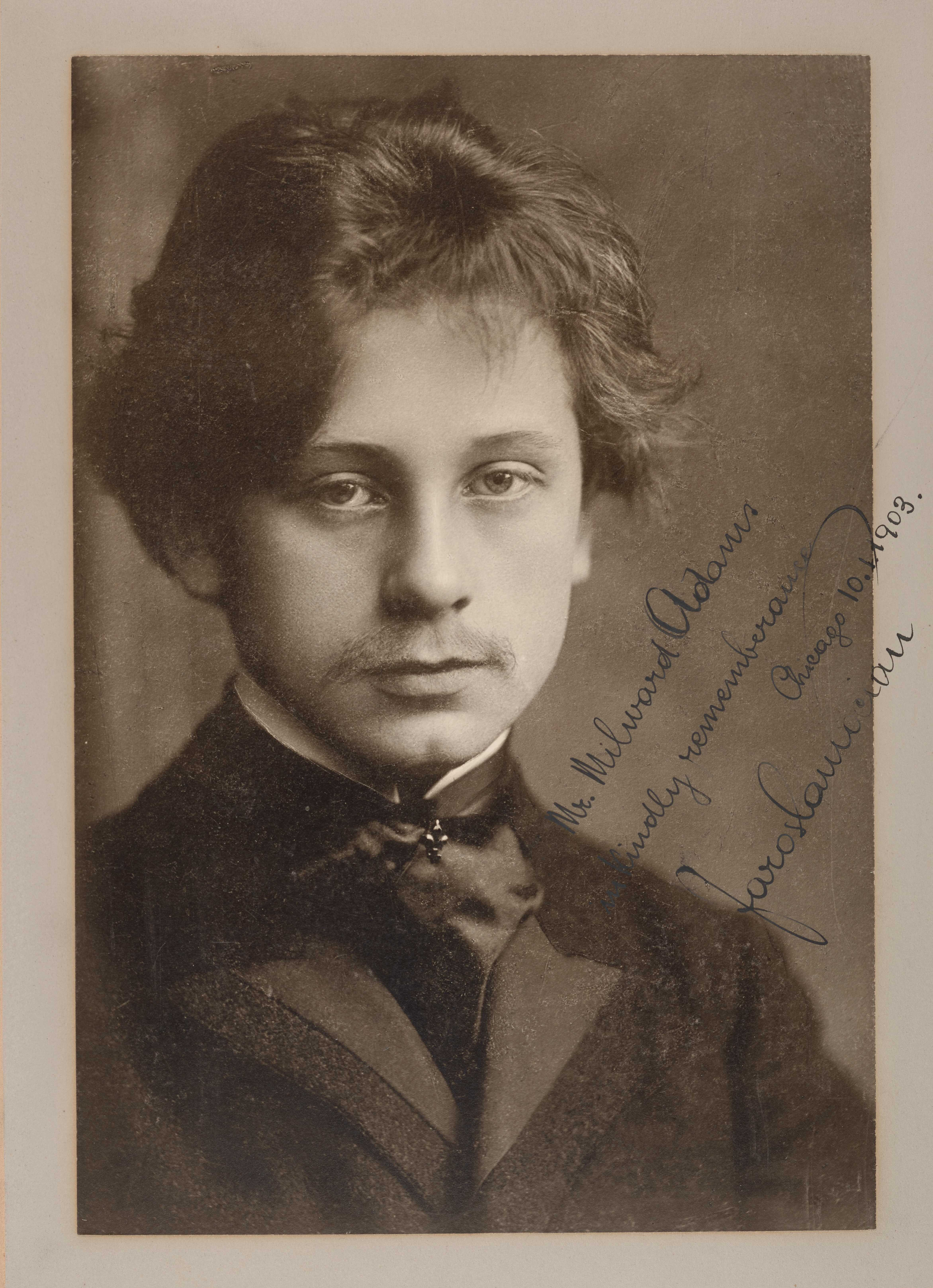
Jaroslav Kocian, c. 1903 (Newberry Library, Chicago)

Jaroslav Kocian (22 February 1883 – 8 March 1950) was a Czech violinist, classical composer and teacher. Together with Jan Kubelík he is considered as the most important representative of "Ševčík's school". He was celebrated as an interpreter of violin compositions of Johann Sebastian Bach. As a composer he is especially noted for his compositions for the violin, which have been recorded most often by his student Josef Suk.

== Life ==
Kocian was born in Ústí nad Orlicí on 22 February 1883. His father, Julius Kocian, was a violinist, teacher and a former classmate of famous virtuoso Otakar Ševčík. Kocian's three sisters were also gifted, but he surpassed them with his exceptional talent. He received his first violin at the age of four. He made his first public appearance in 1887 at the annual music festival in Ústí nad Orlicí. His first teacher after his father was Josef Zábrodský, who also prepared him for the conservatory exams.

In 1893 Kocian went to Prague to take the exams for the Prague Conservatory, which he passed, but was not accepted to study due to his poor health and small stature. Only in 1897 he was accepted into Otakar Ševčík's class. He also studied piano and composition with Antonín Dvořák. He graduated in 1901 playing one of Paganini's violin concertos in Rudolfinum.

After graduating, he gave concerts in various European cities - including at the coronation of King Edward. In 1902 he made his first tour of the US with his fellow conservatoire student, the pianist František Špindler. Both had phenomenal memories and took no music with them on their five-month tour, during which they played 58 concerts. In the following years he was almost constantly on the road, except for 1907–1909, which he spent in Odesa as a professor at the conservatory and leader of the Odesa Czech Quartet. He had an extensive concert repertoire based on works by Bach, Haydn, Mozart, Beethoven, Tchaikovsky, Smetana and Dvořák. He remained in Bohemia during the World War I. After the establishment of Czechoslovakia, Kocian again gave concerts throughout the country and made his last tour abroad. In 1922 he visited the United States again, performing in Yokohama, Tokyo and Shanghai on his way back. He often returned to his home town of Ústí nad Orlicí, where he spent his free time picking mushrooms, cycling, playing sports and chatting with friends. In 1930, due to a nervous illness, he ended his concert career and devoted himself exclusively to teaching and composing. He was prominent member of masonic lodge Jan Amos Komenský in Prague. Kocian died after long illness on 8 March 1950 in Prague. He is buried at Vyšehrad Cemetery.

== Teaching ==
He taught at the Prague Conservatory, at first as an assistant to Otakar Ševčík, from 1924 as a professor. He became a tenured professor in 1929 and the rector of the conservatory from 1939 to 1940. His most famous students were Josef Suk, Václav Snítil, Jan Sedivka and Alexandr Plocek.

== Legacy ==
The Kocian Violin Competition has been held annually in his hometown Ústí nad Orlicí since 1959. The Kocian Quartet and Chamber Orchestra of Jaroslav Kocian were named in his honor.

== Compositions ==
Kocian's arrangements of Suk's Six Piano Pieces Op.7 for violin were performed by many violinists including Leonid Kogan, Henryk Szeryng, David Oistrakh, Janine Jansen or Josef Suk. He also made arrangements of Dvořáks Walzes op. 54.

His own compositions include:

- Dumka (1901)
- Old Folks at Home (1907)
- Serenade and Humoresque op. 17 (1909)
- Méditation du Soir (1911)
- Intermezzo pitoresque (1911)
- Hymne au Printeps (1911)
- Lullaby (1911)

== Discography ==
- No.1422, Serenade (Gabriel Pierné)
- No.1423, Canzonetta (Alfredo D'Ambrosio)
- No.1458, Elfin Dance (Leo Spies)
