= Saša Večtomov =

Czech cellist (1930–1989)

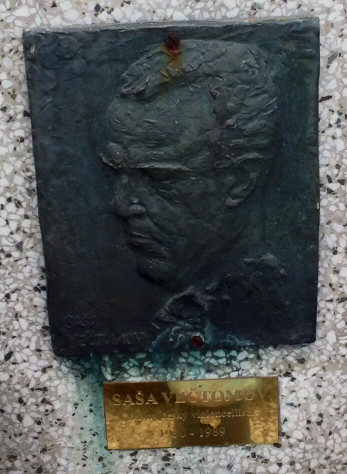
- Memorial plaque on Saša Večtomov's gravestone, contributed by former students, at graveyard in Veselí nad Lužnicí
- Born: Alexandr Večtomov; 12 December 1930; Prague, Czechoslovakia
- Died: 29 December 1989 (aged 59); Prague, Czechoslovakia
- Occupation: Cellist
- Years active: 1945–1989
- Spouse: Jana Andrsová (m. 1964–1989, his death)
- Children: 3

Alexandr Večtomov, better known as Saša Večtomov (12 December 1930 – 29 December 1989) was a Czech cellist and music pedagogue.

== Biography ==
Večtomov first studied piano and cello with his father, cellist/composer Ivan Večtomov (1902–1981), a soloist in the Czech Philharmonic. He continued at Prague Conservatory under the tutelage of his father, and later at the Academy of Performing Arts in Prague alongside Mirko Škampa and Josef Chuchro under cellist/pedagogue Ladislav Zelenka. He then pursued his graduate studies at Moscow Conservatory under Semen Kozolupov until 1957, and master classes at Accademia Musicale Chigiana under French cellist André Navarra.

In 1951, together with Josef Suk (violin) and Jiří Hubička (piano), Večtomov established the concert ensemble Suk Trio. In 1956 he took over from Miloš Sádlo playing cello in the Czech Trio, in which he continued to perform concerts and record until his death 33 years later. He recorded many works on LP and CD as a solo performer, as well as for radio and television broadcasts. He also performed and recorded with his brother, the guitarist Vladimír Večtomov, as Prague String Duo, releasing phonograph recordings on the Supraphon, Panton, and Melodiya labels. In 2015 the Czech music label Uneventful Records released a CD and digital album of Prague String Duo's archive recordings.

Along with Sádlo, Večtomov was considered one of Czechoslovakia's leading classical artists, drawing comparisons in the international press to Russian cellist Mstislav Rostropovich, who had been his contemporary at the Moscow Conservatory. Večtomov was best known for his inimitably sweet tone. "As the concerto develops, it is clear that Večtomov, so august a member of the Czech Trio, was certainly a big enough concerto soloist, but one who does not seek to impose his personality onto the music. Instead he illuminates it from within." Of the same recording, Fanfare observed: “I am glad to have discovered Saša Večtomov’s playing, for on this evidence he was a world-class artist … his aristocratic playing deserves a hearing, and the disc should certainly be of interest to cellists and collectors."

Regarding the unusual combination of cello and guitar in Prague String Duo, Večtomov commented that a piano absorbs some of a cello's gentler shades of tone, which thus become superfluous; that the guitar can respond more sensitively than the harpsichord to the means of expression of the solo cello; and that it can differentiate all tones and produce vibrato and glissando transitions. Moreover, the cello/guitar combination, he said, is more tender, more sensitive, and better integrated than any other, as the two instruments are also much alike in the technical respect. According to the music historian Ludomír Česenek, "The 'string duet' combination is much more than a novelty in scoring musical compositions. It constitutes an experiment rooted in the tradition of the technique of music, an endeavor to discover the sources of musical expression, a renaissance of an approach which, while overtaken by the past development, has lost nothing of its aesthetic validity or of the potential to resurrect it and develop it in the modern spirit."

Večtomov played on two instruments, a 1712 Alessandro Gagliano and a 1754 Giovanni Battista Guadagnini. It is said that in his playing technique he had mastered 30 distinctive glissandi.

== Accolades ==
Večtomov was awarded prizes in 14 international contests, including the 1955 Prague Spring International Music Competition 1st prize. Throughout his career he was particularly associated with the work of Bohuslav Martinů, whose Cello Concerto No. 2 he interpreted as a world premiere as well as his Variations on a Slovak Folk Song. Večtomov recorded ten of Martinů's major works and in 1970 was awarded the Grand Prix du Disque for his 1965 Supraphon recording of Cello Concerto No. 2.
