= Josef Chuchro =

Czech music educator, violoncellist and university educator (1931–2009)

Josef Chuchro (3 July 1931 – 19 August 2009) was a Czech cellist.

== Life and career ==
Josef Chuchro was born on 3 July 1931 in Prague. His father Josef Chuchro senior (1903–1975), who was an organist, provided him with the basics of musical education. He studied at the Prague Conservatory and the Academy of Performing Arts in Prague with Prof. Karel Pravoslav Sádlo, and went on to teach, becoming, from 1990 to 1997, Dean of the Academy of Performing Arts. Among his students were: Jiří Bárta, cs:Mikael Ericsson, and Tomáš Jamník.

He was awarded first prize in the Prague Spring Festival of 1955, and first prize in the Casals second International Cello Contest of 1959, held in Mexico.

He was a member of the Suk Trio (in which he replaced the founding cellist, Saša Večtomov), from 1952, and the Prague Cello Duo (founded in 1979 with his son Jan). In 1961, he was appointed soloist of the Czech Philharmonic.

Chuchro died on 19 August 2009 in Prague.

== Recordings ==
The complete recording of Beethoven's sonatas and variations for cello and piano performed by Josef Chuchro and Jan Panenka received an Award of Merit.

Josef Chuchro recorded 38 solo gramophone records, 9 of them with the Czech Philharmonic, and among the recordings 40 chamber music compositions.
