= Kocian Quartet =

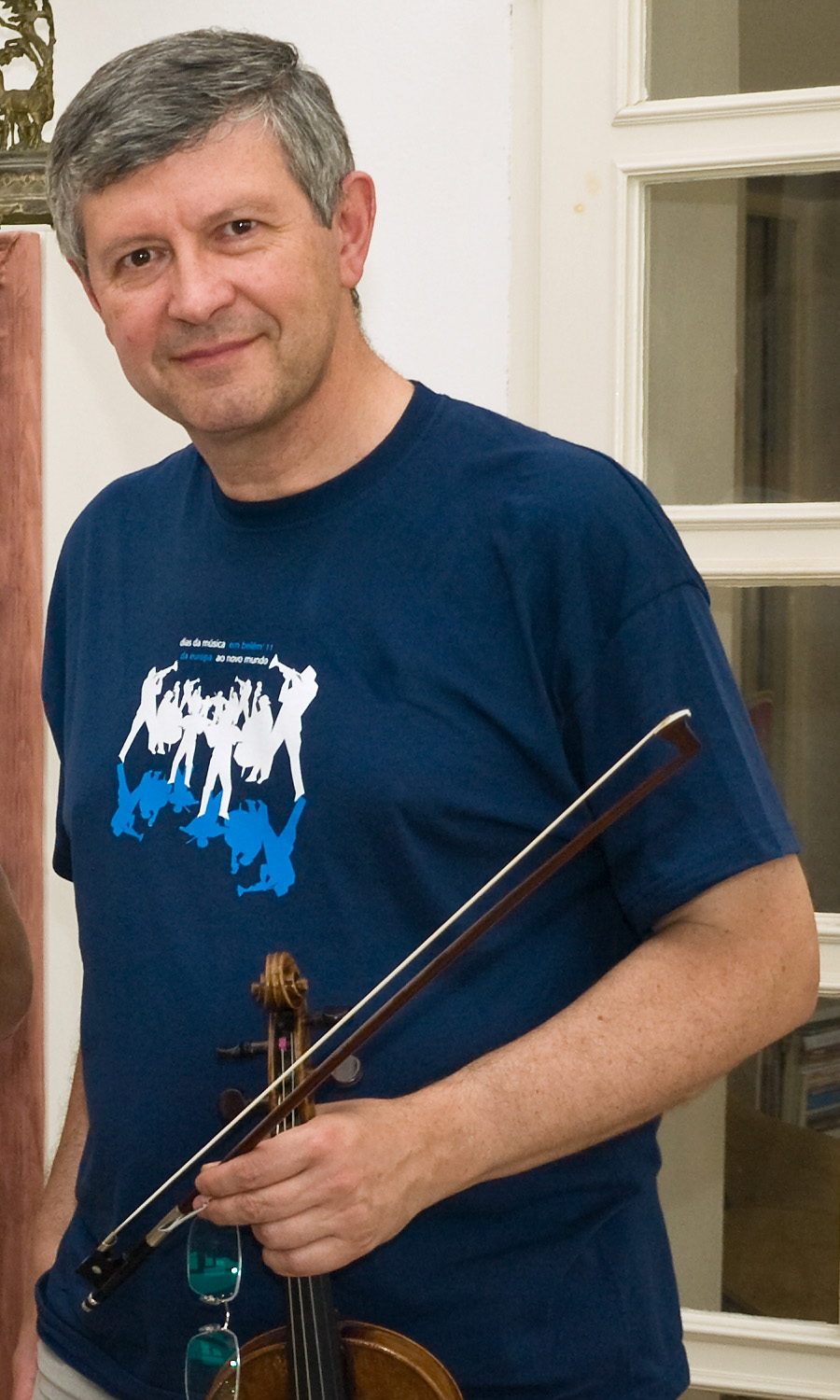
Leader Pavel Hůla in 2011

The Kocián Quartet is a Czech classical chamber ensemble. Originally named the New String Quartet, it was founded in 1972 by three members of the Prague Symphony Orchestra (Jan Odstrčil – 2nd violin, Jiří Najnar – viola, Václav Bernášek – cello) with Pravoslav Kohout as 1st violin. In 1975 they were renamed the Kocián Quartet in honor of famous violinist Jaroslav Kocián.

Between 2001 and 2009, the quartet consisted of: Pavel Hůla – 1st violin, Miloš Černý – 2nd violin, Zbyněk Paďourek – viola and Václav Bernášek – cello.

The quartet has regularly appeared at the Prague Spring International Music Festival since 1976.
