= Vladimír Večtomov =

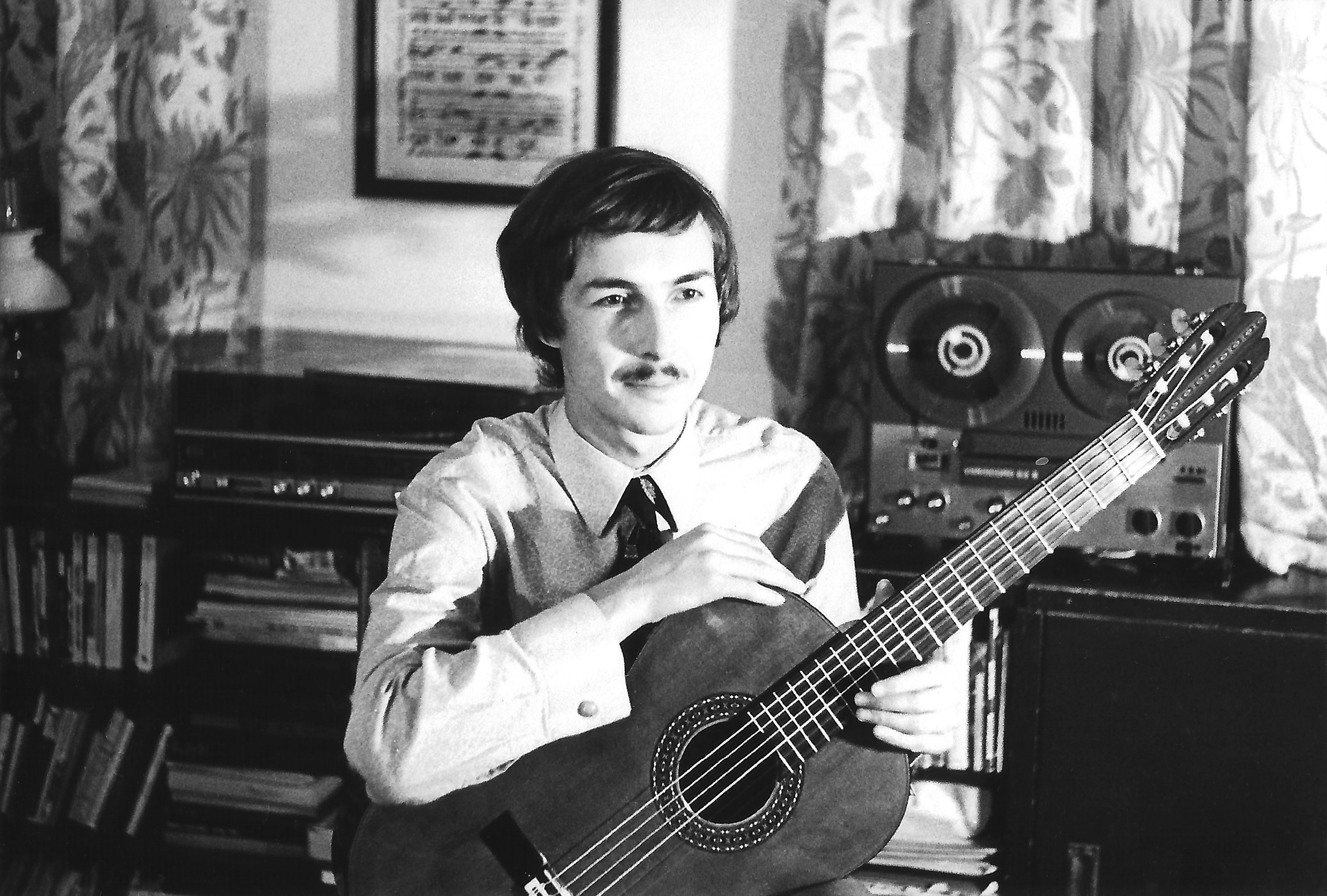
- Vladimír Večtomov (Prague, 1970)
- Born: 2 February 1946; Prague, Czechoslovakia
- Died: 12 October 2015 (aged 69); Tábor, Czech Republic
- Occupation(s): guitarist music pedagogue
- Years active: 1963–2005
- Spouse(s): Saramay Sepúlveda (m. 1968–1978); Sonja Vectomov (m. 1979–1998); Radana Večtomová (m. 2000–2002); Alena Večtomová (m. 2004–2015, his death)
- Children: Sandra, Lenka, Sonja
- Parent(s): Ivan Večtomov, cellist, music pedagogue; Jarmila Večtomová, née Černá, pianist, music pedagogue
- Website: Appreciation Society (YouTube channel)

Vladimír Večtomov (2 February 1946 – 12 October 2015) was a Czech classical guitarist.

== Biography ==
He studied at Prague Conservatory under the tutelage of Štěpán Urban, 1964–1968, and gave his first concert at the age of 17. He concluded his studies in Mexico with a concert at Palacio de Bellas Artes in Mexico City. In 1973 he performed as a soloist in Bergen, Norway, with Slovak Chamber Orchestra. In 1974 he performed Bach's catalog in London to notable acclaim. From 1972 to 1976 he was a professor at Prague Conservatory.

In 1970, on return to Czechoslovakia from Mexico, Večtomov formed Prague String Duo with his brother, cellist Saša Večtomov. The duo's many appearances outside Czechoslovakia—filling concert halls in the Soviet Union, United States, United Kingdom, Mexico, Norway, Portugal and many other countries—established them internationally. A salient feature of the duo's repertory was its focus on Iberian composers, whom they favored owing to the national character of the accompanying instrument and the fact that Vladimír had for years studied on a Mexican government scholarship under the tutelage of guitarist Prof. Manuel López Ramos in Mexico City.

In addition to old masters (e.g., Haydn, Eccles, Maria Theresia von Paradis), and modern and sometimes local ones (Granados, Janáček), the brothers Večtomov performed music by contemporary composers including their father, Prof. Ivan Večtomov, who, moreover, wrote all of their arrangements. According to Mexican journalist Isabel Farfán Cano, Janáček's Fairy Tale was a brilliant staple of the duo's concert programs. Further, writes Cano of a particular concert in 1976, "the harmony of both instruments in creating sound coloration and tones was complemented by technical security, gradual and protruding."

In 1982 Večtomov accepted an invitation to join the faculty of Keski-Suomen konservatorio (later renamed Jyväskylän ammattikorkeakoulu), in Jyväskylä, Finland, where he continued to teach until 1998. He then returned to Prague and taught at Základní Umělecká Škola Lounských.

Phonograph recordings of Večtomov have been issued on the Supraphon, Panton, and Melodiya labels. In 2015 the Czech music label Uneventful Records released a CD and digital album of Prague String Duo archive recordings.

== Misc. ==
Večtomov's conservatory days are recounted in fellow pupil František Ringo Čech's 1983 memoir Z mého života.

His instrument was a Masaru Kohno Luthier, Tokyo, Model 20 1974 (string length: 660mm).

== Death ==
On 12 October 2015, Večtomov died in Tábor. During his final year Večtomov had been placing finishing touches on an album of Prague String Duo archive recordings due for release in December 2015.
