= Smetana Quartet =

Czech string quartet

The Smetana Quartet (Czech: Smetanovo kvarteto) was a Czech string quartet that was in existence from 1943 to 1989, although it was known as the Smetana Quartet only from 1945 onwards.

== Personnel ==
1st violin

- Václav Neumann (1920-1995), from 1943 to 1945
- Jaroslav Rybenský, from 1945 to 1947
- Jiří Novák (1924-2010), since 1947

2nd violin

- Lubomír Kostecký (1922-2003)

Viola

- Jiří Neumann, from 1943 to 1945
- Václav Neumann, from 1945 to 1947
- Jaroslav Rybenský, from 1947 to 1956
- Milan Škampa (1928-2018), since 1956

Cello

- Antonín Kohout (1919-2013)

== Origins and activities ==
The Smetana Quartet arose from the Quartet of the Czech Conservatory, which was founded in 1943 (during the Nazi occupation) in Prague by Antonín Kohout, the cellist. With Jaroslav Rybenský and Lubomír Kostecký as first and second violins, and Václav Neumann as violist, the group gave its first performance as the Smetana Quartet on 6 November 1945, at the Municipal Library in Prague. Neumann left to pursue conducting in 1947, at which point Rybenský went to the viola desk and Jiří Novák (who shared first violin desk with Josef Vlach, founder of the Vlach Quartet, under Vaclav Talich in the Czech Chamber Orchestra) came in as first violin.

By 1949 the group had official connections with the Czech Philharmonic. The first foreign tour was in 1949, to Poland, and the first recording was of the second quartet by Bedřich Smetana in 1950. Rybenský was obliged to retire after ill health in 1952, and was replaced by Milan Škampa. The performers were appointed professors at the Academy of Musical Arts in 1967. Of their many recordings, those made at that time for German Electrola are considered particularly fine.

For many years the Smetana Quartet played its entire repertoire from memory, and throughout its career retained a core of Czech works that it performed without scores.

The Smetana Quartet made the third commercial digital recording ever made, Mozart's K.421 and K.458, in Tokyo April 24–26, 1972. They re-recorded the same repertoire ten years later in Prague.

Antonín Kohout trained the Kocian Quartet (founded 1972) and the Martinů Quartet (1976), though the latter's members had been pupils of Professor Viktor Moučka, cellist of the Vlach Quartet.

== Notes and references ==
Notes

Bibliography

- Vladimír Šefl, Smetanovo Kvarteto (Supraphon, 1974)
- Jirǐ Berkovec, The Smetana Quartet (Orbis 1956)
