= Václav Neumann =

Czech conductor and musician (1920–1995)

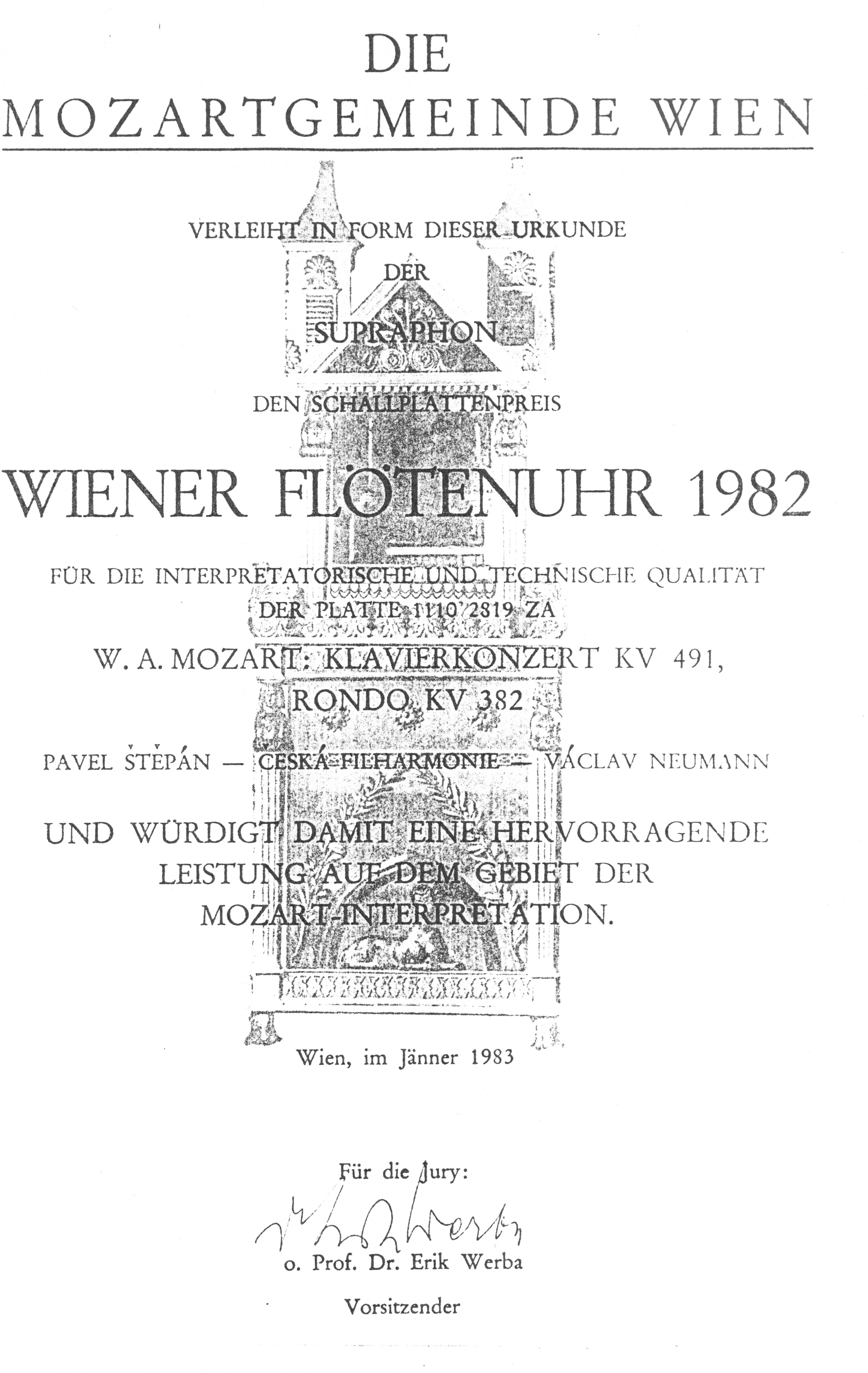
Wiener Flötenuhr 1982

Václav Neumann (29 October 1920 – 2 September 1995) was a Czech conductor, violinist, violist, and opera director.

== Life and career ==
Neumann was born in Prague, where he studied at the Prague Conservatory with Josef Micka (violin), and Pavel Dědeček and Metod Doležil (conducting) from 1940 through 1945. He co-founded the Smetana Quartet, playing 1st violin and then viola.

Neumann made his debut as a conductor with the Czech Philharmonic Orchestra in 1948, remaining as a conductor with that ensemble through 1950. In 1951 he became principal conductor of the Karlovy Vary Symphony Orchestra. He left that post in 1954 to become principal conductor of the Brno Symphony Orchestra (SOKB). In 1956, he began to conduct at the Komische Oper in Berlin; beginning with a celebrated production of Janáček’s The Cunning Little Vixen on 30 May 1956. He toured with that production to Paris and Wiesbaden; conducting a total of 215 performance between the three cities. He remained at the Komische Oper for eight years, leaving in 1964 to become conductor of the Leipzig Gewandhaus Orchestra and general music director of the Leipzig Opera. He stayed there until 1968, when he became principal conductor of the Czech Philharmonic, a post he held until 1990 and again in 1992–1993. He was concurrently general music director of the Stuttgart Staatsoper from 1970 through 1973.

Neumann taught conducting at the Prague Academy for Music, where his students included Oliver von Dohnányi and Vítězslav Podrazil.

Neumann was particularly noted as a champion of Czech music, and made the first studio recording of Leoš Janáček's opera The Excursions of Mr. Brouček in 1962.

Neumann can be seen conducting the Czech Philharmonic in a recording of the Dvořák Cello Concerto with Julian Lloyd Webber. This is featured in the 1988 film Dvorak - In Love? by director Tony Palmer.
