= 2014 Czech Lion Awards =

Czech film award ceremony

22nd Czech Lion Awards
- Date: January 14, 2015
- Site: Rudolfinum, Prague
- Hosted by: Lucie Výborná

Highlights
- Best Picture: The Way Out
- Best Actor: Ivan Trojan; Nowhere in Moravia
- Best Actress: Klaudia Dudová; The Way Out
- Best Supporting Actor: Jaroslav Plesl; Nowhere in Moravia
- Best Supporting Actress: Lenka Krobotová; Nowhere in Moravia
- Most awards: Way Out (7)
- Most nominations: Fair Play (15)

Television coverage
- Network: Česká televize

2014 Czech Lion Awards ceremony was held on 14 January 2015. Fair Play received highest number of nominations but eventually failed to win in any category. The Way Out on the other hand won 7 awards, including Best Film category.

== Winners and nominees ==
Best Film	Best Director
The Way Out – Miloš Lochman, Jan Macola, Karel Chvojka; Nowhere in Moravia – Ondřej Zima; Fair Play – Kateřina Černá, Pavel Strnad; To See the Sea – Miloslav Šmídmajer; Three Brothers – Jan Svěrák	The Way Out – Petr Václav; Nowhere in Moravia – Miroslav Krobot; Fair Play – Andrea Sedláčková; To See the Sea – Jiří Mádl; Three Brothers – Jan Svěrák
Best Actor in a Leading Role	Best Actress in a Leading Role
Nowhere in Moravia – Ivan Trojan; Angels – Boleslav Polívka; Fair Play – Roman Luknár; Hostage – Milan Lasica; US 2 – Ondřej Nosálek	The Way Out – Klaudia Dudová; Angels – Klára Melíšková; Nowhere in Moravia – Tatiana Vilhelmová; Fair Play – Judit Bárdos; Tender Waves – Tatiana Pauhofová
Best Actor in a Supporting Role	Best Actress in a Supporting Role
Nowhere in Moravia – Jaroslav Plesl; Fair Play – Igor Bareš; Hostage – Ondřej Vetchý; Krásno – Karel Roden; Storyteller – Matěj Hádek	Nowhere in Moravia – Lenka Krobotová; Angels – Zuzana Bydžovská; The Way Out – Mária Ferencová-Zajacová; Fair Play – Anna Geislerová; Fair Play – Eva Josefíková
Best Screenplay	Best Editing
The Way Out – Petr Václav; Nowhere in Moravia – Lubomír Smékal, Miroslav Krobot; Fair Play – Andrea Sedláčková; To See the Sea – Jiří Mádl; Three Brothers – Zdeněk Svěrák	The Way Out – Florent Mangeot; Nowhere in Moravia – Jan Daňhel; Fair Play – Jakub Hejna; Hostage – Alois Fišárek; Three Brothers – Alois Fišárek
Best Cinematography	Stage Design
The Way Out – Štěpán Kučera; Nowhere in Moravia – Jan Baset Střítežský; Fair Play – Jan Baset Střítežský; Storyteller – Martin Štrba; Three Brothers – Vladimír Smutný	Three Brothers – Jan Vlasák; The Way Out – Jan Pfeiffer; Nowhere in Moravia – Jan Vlček; Fair Play – Petr Fořt, Viera Dandová; Hostage – Pavol Andraško
Makeup and Hairstyling	Costume Design
Three Brothers – Zdeněk Klika; Fair Play – Lukáš Král; Nowhere in Moravia – Anett Weber, Katarína Horská; Krásno – Lucie Lišková; Tender Waves – Jiřina Pahlerová	Three Brothers – Simona Rybáková; The Way Out – Tereza Kučerová; Nowhere in Moravia – Katarína Hollá; Fair Play – Simona Rybáková; Hany – Zuzana Krejzková
Music	Sound
Krásno – Jan P. Muchow; Angels – Michal Novinski; Fair Play – David Solař, Miro Žbirka; Storyteller – Roman Holý; Three Brothers – Jaroslav Uhlíř, Michal Novinski	The Way Out – Daniel Němec, Ivan Horák; Nowhere in Moravia – Viktor Ekrt, Marek Hart; Fair Play – Daniel Němec; Storyteller – Radim Hladík; Three Brothers – Jakub Čech, Claus Lynge
Unique Contribution to Czech Film	Best Documentary
Drahomíra Vihanová	Olga – Miroslav Janek; Into the Clouds We Gaze – Martin Dušek; The Magic Voice of a Rebel – Olga Sommerová; Old Man and the World – Petr Horký; Život podle Václava Havla – Andrea Sedláčková

=== Non-statutory Awards ===
- Best Film Poster
  - Fair Play
- Film Fans Award
  - Fair Play
- Magnesie Award for Best Student Film
  - A Righteous Choice
