= List of Czech films of 2014 =

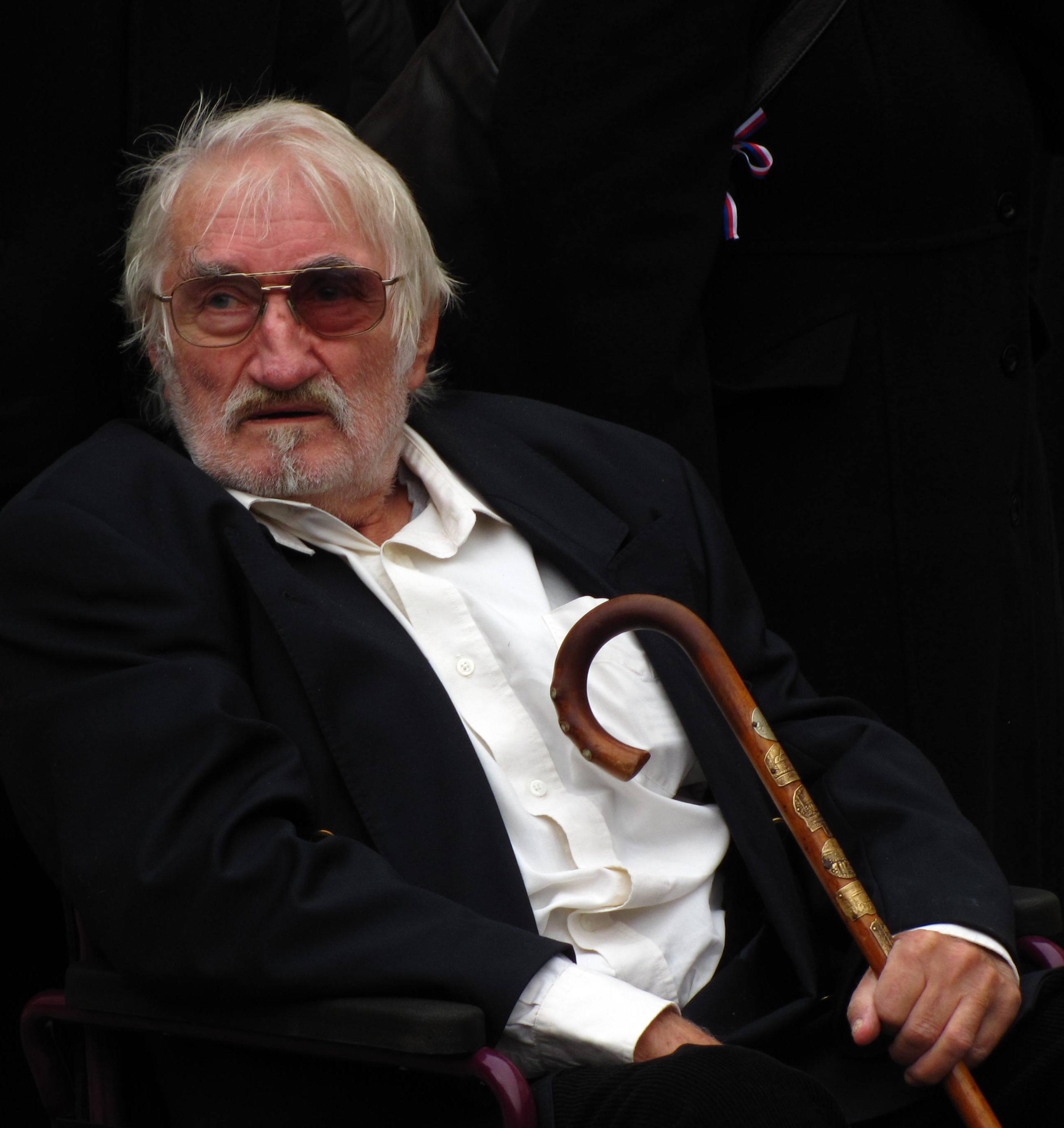
2014 saw the death of Pavel Landovský.

The Czech film industry produced over forty feature films in 2014. This article fully lists all non-pornographic films, including short films, that had a release date in that year and which were at least partly made by the Czech Republic. It does not include films first released in previous years that had release dates in 2014.
Also included is an overview of the major events in Czech film, including film festivals and awards ceremonies, as well as lists of those films that have been particularly well received, both critically and financially.

== Major releases ==
Opening		Title	Cast and Crew	Studio	Genre(s)	Ref.
J A N U A R Y	16	Anita B.	Director: Roberto Faenza; Cast: Eline Powell, Robert Sheehan, Andrea Osvárt		Drama	
J A N U A R Y	30	Viy	Director: Oleg Stepchenko; Cast: Aleksey Chadov, Valery Zolotukhin, Anna Churina, Charles Dance, Agniya Ditkovskite, Jason Flemyng	NBC Universal Russia	Fantasy	
M A R C H	6	Fair Play	Director: Andrea Sedláčková; Cast: Vlastina Svátková		Drama	
M A Y	29	The Way Out	Director: Petr Václav; Cast: Klaudia Dudová, David Ištok, Mária Ferencová-Zajacová, Milan Cifra, Natálie Hlaváčová, Sára Makulová, Přemysl Bureš	Aerofilms	Drama	
J U L Y	9	Corn Island	Director: Giorgi Ovashvili; Cast: İlyas Salman		Drama	
O C T O B E R	13	Serena	Director: Susanne Bier; Cast: Jennifer Lawrence, Bradley Cooper, Rhys Ifans, Sean Harris, Toby Jones	StudioCanal	Drama	

== Notable deaths ==
Month	Date	Name	Age	Nationality	Profession	Notable films
September	5	Karel Černý	92	Czech	Art Director and Production Designer	Amadeus; The Wolves of Willoughby Chase
October	10	Pavel Landovský	78	Czech	Actor	Ragtime; The Unbearable Lightness of Being

== See also ==
- 2014 in film
- 2014 in the Czech Republic
- Cinema of the Czech Republic
- List of Czech submissions for the Academy Award for Best Foreign Language Film
