= 2016 Czech Lion Awards =

Czech film and TV award ceremony

24th Czech Lion Awards
- Date: March 4, 2017
- Site: Rudolfinum, Prague
- Hosted by: Adela Vinczeová

Highlights
- Best Picture: A Prominent Patient
- Best Actor: Karel Roden; A Prominent Patient
- Best Actress: Michalina Olszańska; I, Olga Hepnarová
- Best Supporting Actor: Oldřich Kaiser; A Prominent Patient
- Best Supporting Actress: Klára Melíšková; I, Olga Hepnarová
- Most awards: A Prominent Patient (12)
- Most nominations: A Prominent Patient (14)

Television coverage
- Network: Česká televize
- Ratings: 587,000

2016 Czech Lion Awards ceremony was held on 4 March 2017. A Prominent Patient has won 12 awards, including Best picture film.

== Winners and nominees ==
Best Film	Best Director
A Prominent Patient – Rudolf Biermann, Julius Ševčík; Anthropoid – Mickey Liddell, Pete Shilaimon, Sean Ellis, David Ondříček, Kryštof Mucha; I, Olga Hepnarová – Tomáš Weinreb, Petr Kazda, Vojtěch Frič, Marcin Kurek, Sylwester Banaszkiewicz, Marian Urban; Family Film – Zuzana Mistríková, Ľubica Orechovská, Ondřej Zima, Jan Prušinovský; The Teacher – Jiří Konečný	Julius Ševčík – A Prominent Patient; Sean Ellis – Anthropoid; Tomáš Weinreb, Petr Kazda – I, Olga Hepnarová; Olmo Omerzu – Family Film; Jan Hřebejk – The Teacher
Best Actor in a Leading Role	Best Actress in a Leading Role
Karel Roden – A Prominent Patient; Jiří Bartoška – Theory of Tiger; Cillian Murphy – Anthropoid; Karel Roden – We Are Never Alone; Ivan Trojan – Anděl Páně 2	Michalina Olszańska – I, Olga Hepnarová; Eliška Balzerová – Theory of Tiger; Vanda Hybnerová – Family Film; Zuzana Mauréry – The Teacher; Lenka Vlasáková – We Are Never Alone
Best Actor in a Supporting Role	Best Actress in a Supporting Role
Oldřich Kaiser – A Prominent Patient; Jamie Dornan – Anthropoid; Miroslav Hanuš – We Are Never Alone; Boleslav Polívka – Anděl Páně 2; Hanns Zischler – A Prominent Patient	Klára Melíšková – I, Olga Hepnarová; Arly Jover – A Prominent Patient; Daniela Kolářová – The Noonday Witch; Zuzana Kronerová – Red Captain; Simona Stašová – The Devil's Mistress
Best Screenplay	Best Editing
A Prominent Patient – Petr Kolečko, Alex Koenigsmark, Julius Ševčík; Anthropoid – Anthony Frewin, Sean Ellis; I, Olga Hepnarová – Tomáš Weinreb, Petr Kazda; The Teacher – Petr Jarchovský; We Are Never Alone – Petr Václav	A Prominent Patient – Marek Opatrný; Anděl Páně 2 – Jan Mattlach; Anthropoid – Richard Mettler; Doomed Beauty – Jakub Hejna; The Teacher – Vladimír Barák
Best Cinematography	Stage Design
A Prominent Patient – Martin Štrba; Anthropoid – Sean Ellis; I, Olga Hepnarová – Adam Sikora; The Noonday Witch – Alexander Šurkala; We Are Never Alone – Štěpán Kučera	A Prominent Patient – Milan Býček; Anthropoid – Morgan Kennedy; The Devil's Mistress – Zdeněk Flemming; The Oddsockeaters – Galina Miklínová; The Teacher – Juraj Fábry
Makeup and Hairstyling	Costume Design
A Prominent Patient – Lukáš Král; Anděl Páně 2 – Andrea McDonald; Anthropoid – Gabriela Poláková, Linda Eisenhamerová; I, Olga Hepnarová – Alina Janerka; The Teacher – Anita Hroššová	A Prominent Patient – Katarína Štrbová Bieliková; Anděl Páně 2 – Katarína Hollá; Anthropoid – Josef Čechota; I, Olga Hepnarová – Aneta Grňáková; The Teacher – Katarína Štrbová Bieliková
Music	Sound
A Prominent Patient – Michal Lorenc, Kryštof Marek; Anthropoid – Robin Foster; The Devil's Mistress – Ondřej Soukup; Red Captain – Petr Ostrouchov; The Teacher – Michal Novinski	A Prominent Patient – Viktor Ekrt, Pavel Rejholec; Anděl Páně 2 – Radim Hladík jr.; Anthropoid – Yves Marie Omnes; The Oddsockeaters – Jan Čeněk, Richard Müller; The Noonday Witch – Petr Šoupa, Martin Jílek, Viktor Prášil
Unique Contribution to Czech Film	Best Documentary
Karlovy Vary International Film Festival	Normal Autistic Film – Jan Macola; Brother Karel – Barbara Ławska, Hana Třeštíková; Doomed Beauty – Hana Třeštíková; FC Roma – Pavla Janoušková Kubečková, Tereza Polachová; Helena's Law – Klára Žaloudková
Best Television Film or Miniseries	BestTV Series
Murder in Polná; A Vote for the King of the Romans; Blue Shadows	Wasteland; Cosmic; Rapl

=== Non-statutory Awards ===
- Best Film Poster
  - I, Olga Hepnarová – Lukáš Veverka
  - A Prominent Patient – Rudolf Biermann, Julius Ševčík
  - The Noonday Witch – Petr Skala
  - The Teacher – Michal Tilsch
  - The Wolf from Royal Vineyard Street – Tereza Kučerová, Jakub Suchý
- Film Fans Award
  - Anthropoid
- Magnesie Award for Best Student Film
  - Kyjev Moskva – Anna Lyubynetska
  - 3. poločas – Jiří Volek
  - Benny – Michal Hruška
  - Černý dort – Johana Švarcová
  - Vězení – Damián Vodrášek
