= Collegium 1704 =

Czech Baroque orchestra based in Prague

- Orchestra
- Founded: 2005
- Location: Prague
- Concert hall: Rudolfinum
- Principal conductor: Václav Luks
- Website: www.collegium1704.com

Collegium 1704 is a Czech early music orchestra and choir founded in 2005 by the Czech conductor, harpsichordist, and horn player Václav Luks. The Collegium Vocale 1704 is the affiliated vocal ensemble. Since 2007, the ensemble has been making regular guest appearances at festivals and concert halls all over Europe: the Salzburger Festspiele (2015, 2016, 2018), the Berliner Philharmonie, London’s Wigmore Hall, Vienna’s Theater an der Wien and Konzerthaus, the Lucerne Festival, BOZAR (Palais des Beaux-Arts) in Brussels, the Chopin Festival in Warsaw, Wratislavia Cantans, and the Elbphilharmonie, and it is an ensemble-in-residence at the festival Oude Muziek in Utrecht and at the Leipzig Bachfest. In 2008, Music Bridge Prague — Dresden began, bringing together the two cities’ wealth of cultural traditions. In 2012 Collegium 1704 started a concert series at the Rudolfinum in Prague. Since autumn 2015, the two cycles have been merged into a single concert season that continues to take place in parallel in Prague and Dresden. In 2019 Collegium Vocale 1704 launched a series of chamber choir concerts in Prague.

Collegium 1704 specialises in Baroque music, in particular that of Jan Dismas Zelenka, Johann Sebastian Bach, Claudio Monteverdi, and George Frideric Handel. They also strive to promote the music of Josef Mysliveček.

The ensemble cooperates with prominent soloists, both Czech and international, including Magdalena Kožená, Bejun Mehta, Simona Houda-Šaturová, Martina Janková, Hana Blažíková, Karina Gauvin, Lisandro Abadie, and others.

== Opera productions ==
In 2009/2010, Collegium 1704 performed Handel's Rinaldo at the National Theatre in Prague, at Théâtre de Caen, Opéra de Rennes, and Grand Théâtre du Luxembourg. In 2013, they performed Josef Mysliveček’s opera L’olimpiade and the production was nominated for the 2014 International Opera Awards. In 2017, they followed with Antonio Vivaldi’s Arsilda, regina di Ponto in its modern-era world premiere, directed by David Radok - the premiere took place at the Slovak National Theatre in Bratislava and the production toured several European cities, including Opéra de Lille, Théâtre de la ville de Luxembourg, Théâtre de Caen, and Opéra Royale de Versailles. In 2022, Collegium 1704 staged G. F. Handel's Alcina at the National Theatre Brno, in co-production with Théâtre de Caen and Opéra Royale de Versailles, and the production was renewed in 2023.

== Film appearances ==
In 2014 Collegium 1704 collaborated with Bejun Mehta on a DVD of Gluck’s opera Orfeo ed Euridice with the stage director Ondřej Havelka, and with Rolando Villazón on the making of the BBC 2 documentary Mozart in Prague. The ensemble took part in making the director Petr Václav’s film Il Boemo about the life of Josef Mysliveček, and previously in the director's documentary about Mysliveček, Confessions of the Vanished.

== Discography ==
- Jan Dismas Zelenka: Missa Circumcisionis ZWV 11 (Accent, 2026)
- Josef Mysliveček: Il Boemo (Erato, 2023), sol. Simona Šaturová, Raffaella Milanesi, Emöke Baráth, Philippe Jaroussky, Benno Schachtner, Krystian Adam, Juan Sancho
- Bedřich Smetana: My Country (Accent, 2022)
- Luigi Cherubini: Requiem C Minor / Karol Kurpiński: Te Deum, sol. Simona Šaturová (Narodowy Instytut Fryderyka Chopina, 2021)
- Jean-Philippe Rameau: Les Boréades (Château de Versailles Spectacles, 2020)
- Jan Dismas Zelenka: Missa 1724 (Accent, 2020)
- Magdalena Kožená: Il giardino dei sospiri | Marcello, Vinci, Leo, Gasparini, Händel (Accent, 2019)
- Georg Frideric Handel: Messiah (Accent, 2019)
- Johann Sebastian Bach: Oboe concertos et cantatas (Accent, 2018)
- Josef Mysliveček: Violin Concertos (Accent, 2018)
- Jan Dismas Zelenka: Sonatas ZWV 181 | a 2 oboi (violino) e 2 bassi obligati /2CD/ (Accent, 2017)
- Jan Dismas Zelenka: Missa Divi Xaverii ZWV 12 (Accent, 2015)
- Johann Sebastian Bach: Mass in B minor BWV 232 (Accent, 2013)
- Jan Dismas Zelenka: Officium defunctorum ZWV 47 / Requiem ZWV 46 (Accent, 2011)
- Antonín Reichenauer: Concertos | Koncerty (Supraphon, 2010)
- Jan Dismas Zelenka: I Penitenti al Sepolcro del Redentore (Zig-Zag Territoires, 2009)
- Jan Dismas Zelenka: Missa votiva (Zig-Zag Territoires, 2008)
- Jan Dismas Zelenka: Composizioni per Orchestra | Orchestrální skladby (Supraphon, 2005)
- Jiří Antonín Benda: Harpsichord Concertos | Koncerty pro cembalo (ARTA Records, 2005)
- Henrico Albicastro: Concerti a quattro, op. 4 (PAN Classics, 2001)
