= Václav Luks =

Czech musician and conductor (born 1970)

- Born: 14 November 1970 (age 55); Czechoslovakia
- Education: Plzeň Conservatory; Academy of Performing Arts in Prague; Schola Cantorum Basiliensis
- Occupations: Musician; conductor; musicologist; educator
- Years active: 1990s–present
- Employers: Akademie für Alte Musik Berlin; Academy of Performing Arts in Prague
- Style: Baroque
- Musical career
- Genres: Classical; chamber
- Instruments: Harpsichord; horn
- Member of: Collegium 1704; Collegium Vocale 1704

Václav Luks (born 14 November 1970) is a Czech harpsichordist, horn player, conductor, musicologist and educator, founder and artistic director of the Prague Baroque orchestra Collegium 1704 and of the vocal ensemble Collegium Vocale 1704. He specialises in Baroque music, especially in the works of Jan Dismas Zelenka, Johann Sebastian Bach, George Frideric Handel, and others. His activities have played an important role in reviving interest in the works of Czech composers including Zelenka and Josef Mysliveček.

== Education ==
Luks studied horn and piano at the Plzeň Conservatory and at the Academy of Performing Arts in Prague; in 1992, he resumed his studies at the Schola Cantorum Basiliensis in the studios of Jörg-Andreas Bötticher and Jesper Bøje Christensen (in historical keyboard instruments and historical performance practice), graduating as a soloist in 1997. During his studies in Basel, and in the years that followed, he gave concerts in Europe and overseas as the principal horn player of the Akademie für Alte Musik in Berlin.

== Collegium 1704 and Collegium Vocale 1704 ==
Upon his return from abroad, Luks transformed a chamber ensemble that he founded during his studies into the Prague baroque orchestra Collegium 1704 and the affiliated vocal ensemble Collegium Vocale 1704: the most immediate impulse was the project Bach – Prague – 2005, initiated by Luks himself. Since 2007, the ensemble has been making regular guest appearances at festivals and concert halls all over Europe: the Salzburger Festspiele (2015, 2016, 2018), the Berliner Philharmonie, London's Wigmore Hall, Vienna's Theater an der Wien and Konzerthaus, the Lucerne Festival, BOZAR (Palais des Beaux-Arts) in Brussels, the Chopin Festival in Warsaw, Wratislavia Cantans, and the Elbphilharmonie, and it is an ensemble-in-residence at the festival Oude Muziek in Utrecht and at the Leipzig Bachfest. In 2008, Music Bridge Prague – Dresden began, bringing together the two cities' wealth of cultural traditions. In 2012, Collegium 1704 began a concert series at the Rudolfinum in Prague. Since autumn 2015, the two cycles have been merged into a single concert season that continues to take place in parallel in Prague and Dresden. In 2019, Collegium Vocale 1704 launched a series of chamber choir concerts in Prague. The ensemble cooperates with prominent soloists, both Czech and international, including Magdalena Kožená, Bejun Mehta, Simona Houda-Šaturová, Martina Janková, Hana Blažíková, Karina Gauvin, Lisandro Abadie, and others.

== Work with other ensembles ==
In addition to his work with Collegium 1704, Luks also collaborates with international ensembles including Camerata Salzburg, the Akademie für Alte Musik in Berlin, La Cetra Barockorchester Basel and the Dresdner Kammerchor. Amongst his recent projects have been performances of Purcell's opera Dido and Aeneas with Ensemble Pygmalion at the Aix-en-Provence Festival and a programme with works by Polish composers with the ensemble Orkiestra Historyczna. At a benefit concert for the restoration of the Notre-Dame de Paris, Luks conducted the Orchestre National de France.

== Teaching ==
Between 1996 and 1999, Luks taught basso continuo at the Academy of Performing Arts in Prague, and in 2001–2003, he lectured at the University of Music and Theatre Leipzig. He has also worked with the Janáček Academy of Performing Arts in Brno and he is regularly invited to sit on juries of international competitions (Schmelzer-Wettbewerb Melk, Prague, spring 2012).

== Opera and theatre ==
In 2009–2010, Collegium 1704, under Luks's baton, performed Handel's Rinaldo at the Prague National Theatre, Théâtre de Caen, Opéra de Rennes and Grand Théâtre de Luxembourg. In 2013, they performed Josef Mysliveček's opera L'Olimpiade, for which they were nominated for the 2014 International Opera Awards. In 2017, they followed with Antonio Vivaldi's Arsilda, regina di Ponto in its modern-era world premiere, directed by David Radok – the premiere took place at the Slovak National Theatre in Bratislava, and the production toured several European cities, including Opéra de Lille, Grand Théâtre de Luxembourg, Théâtre de Caen, and the Royal Opera of Versailles. In 2022, Collegium 1704, under his direction, staged Handel's Alcina at the National Theatre Brno, in co-production with Théâtre de Caen and Royal Opera of Versailles, and the production was renewed in 2023.

== Film projects ==
In 2014, Collegium 1704, led by Luks, collaborated with Bejun Mehta on a DVD of Gluck's opera Orfeo ed Euridice, with the stage director Ondřej Havelka, and with Rolando Villazón on the making of the BBC Two documentary Mozart in Prague. The ensemble took part in making the director Petr Václav's period film Il Boemo (2022) about the life of Josef Mysliveček, and previously in the director's documentary about Mysliveček, Confessions of the Vanished (2015).

== Cooperation with radio stations ==
Luks works in cooperation with a number of broadcasting networks, such as DeutschlandRadio Berlin, Schweizer Radio DRS, the Österreichischer Rundfunk (ORF), and Radio France, as well as with music publishers like Supraphon, Pan Classics, Zig-Zag Territoires, Arta, and Accent.

== Honours ==
In 2022, Luks was awarded as Chevalier of the Ordre des Arts et des Lettres.

== Discography ==
- Bedřich Smetana: My Country (Accent, 2022)
- Luigi Cherubini: Requiem C Minor / Karol Kurpiński: Te Deum, sol. Simona Šaturová (Narodowy Instytut Fryderyka Chopina, 2021)
- Jean-Philippe Rameau: Les Boréades (Chateau de Versailles Spectacles 2020)
- Jan Dismas Zelenka: Missa 1724 (Accent, 2020)
- Magdalena Kožená: Il giardino dei sospiri | Marcello, Vinci, Leo, Gasparini, Händel (Accent, 2019)
- Georg Frideric Handel: Messiah (Accent, 2019)
- Johann Sebastian Bach: Oboe concertos et cantatas (Accent, 2018)
- Josef Mysliveček: Violin Concertos (Accent, 2018)
- Jan Dismas Zelenka: Sonatas ZWV 181 | a 2 oboi (violino) e 2 bassi obligati /2CD/ (Accent, 2017)
- Jan Dismas Zelenka: Missa Divi Xaverii ZWV 12 (Accent, 2015)
- Johann Sebastian Bach: Mše h moll BWV 232 (Accent, 2013)
- Jan Dismas Zelenka: Officium defunctorum ZWV 47 / Requiem ZWV 46 (Accent, 2011)
- Antonín Reichenauer: Concertos | Koncerty (Supraphon, 2010)
- Jan Dismas Zelenka: I Penitenti al Sepolcro del Redentore (Zig-Zag Territoires, 2009)
- Jan Dismas Zelenka: Missa votiva (Zig-Zag Territoires, 2008)
- Jan Dismas Zelenka: Composizioni per Orchestra | Orchestrální skladby (Supraphon, 2005)
- Jiří Antonín Benda: Harpsichord Concertos | Koncerty pro cembalo (ARTA Records, 2005)
- Henrico Albicastro: Concerti a quattro, op. 4 (PAN Classics, 2001)
