= The New York Baroque Dance Company =

American professional dance company

The New York Baroque Dance Company is a professional American dance company located in New York City. It was founded in 1976 (incorporated 1979) by Artistic Director Catherine Turocy and Ann Jacoby. With a mission to recreate and preserve the full range of 17th and 18th century dances (operas, court balls, salon performances and street shows) the New York Baroque Dance company also serves the community with educational programs for all levels, from elementary school to university, as well as programs for the general public.

The NYBDC has performed with many leading early music specialists, including John Eliot Gardiner, Christopher Hogwood, Nicholas McGegan and Wolfgang Katschner and ensembles that include Opera Lafayette Orchestra and Chorus, The Dallas Bach Society, Mercury Baroque, Apollo's Fire and Philharmonia Baroque. In New York City, the company produces annual performances with Concert Royal Orchestra.

Important productions have included Jean Philippe Rameau's Les Boréades (never performed in the 18th century) and Hippolyte et Aricie at the Aix-en-Provence Festival and the Opera de Lyon; Henry Purcell's Indian Queen at London's Barbican; Scylla et Glaucus by Jean Marie Leclair at the Opera de Lyon as well as more than one hundred performances of a double bill of Rameau's Pygmalion and Handel's Terpsicore. At the International Handel Festival in Göttingen, Germany the company has performed many of that composer's works, including Ariodante, Arianna in Creta, Alcina, Atalanta, Orlando, Terpsicore and Teseo.

== History ==
After studying ballet and dance history at Ohio State University with Shirley Wynne, Turocy and six other dancers formed the Baroque Dance Ensemble which folded in 1975. Turocy relocated to New York City and formed a new company with Ann Jacoby (who had previously danced with the Baroque Dance Ensemble) as The New York Baroque Dance Co. Turocy had met harpsichordist and conductor James Richman at the Aston Magna Music Festival in 1974, where they were collaborating on music of Rameau, and the two eventually married. Richman later founded the Concert Royal Orchestra, whose performances date back to their 1977 Carnegie Hall debut, and with whom the New York Baroque Dance company has frequently collaborated since their 1977 recreation of dances by Jean-Baptiste Lully, Jean-Féry Rebel (Les Caracteres de la Danse) and the complete the dance scene from Rameau's pastoral masque, Les Fetes d'Hebe at Alice Tully Hall.

In 1997, to celebrate the company's 20th anniversary, The New York Public Library presented the exhibition: The New Baroque: Early Dance Re-creations and Inspirations. Ms. Turocy has taught historical performance at the Juilliard School and (with the New York Baroque Dance Company) has been a guest teacher at the Early Music Institute at Indiana University, Oberlin College, Curtis Institute of Music and Case Western Reserve. She directed Mozarts’s The Magic Flute at the University of Miami in 2013 and is a Chevalier of the Ordre des Arts et des Lettres.

With the New York Baroque Dance Company, Turocy won the 2018 Isadora Duncan Dance Award for Outstanding Revival at the 32nd annual "Izzie" Awards for the reconstruction of Rameau's 1745 opera-ballet Le Temple de la Gloire with the Philharmonia Baroque Orchestra & Chorus (sharing the award with Krissy Keefer and Dance Brigade's “The Great Liberation Upon Hearing”). This work had previously been presented by NYBDC and Concert Royal at Florence Gould Hall in 1991. For her work with the company, Turocy won the 2001 Bessie Award for Sustained Achievement in Choreography.
