= Louis Erlo =

French stage director (1929–2026)

- Erlo in the 1970s
- Born: Louis Jean Marie Camerlo; 26 April 1929; Lyon, France
- Died: 2 October 2026 (aged 97); Olmeto, Corsica, France
- Occupations: Stage director; Theatre manager
- Organizations: Opéra de Lyon; Aix-en-Provence Festival

Louis Jean Marie Camerlo (French: [lwi ʒɑ̃ maʁi kamɛʁlo]; 26 April 1929 – 2 October 2026), professionally known as Louis Erlo, was a French stage director and theatre manager. He was director of the Opéra de Lyon from 1969 to 1995, developing it into one of the leading opera houses of Europe.

As director of the Aix-en-Provence Festival from 1982 to 1996, he was instrumental in the revival of French Baroque opera, beginning his tenure with the scenic world premiere of Rameau's last opera, Les Boréades. He also focused on Mozart, especially the neglected youthful operas, such as Mitridate, re di Ponto and La finta giardiniera. He initiated a complete rebuilding of the open-air theatre, completed in 1985, and then programmed also 20th-century operas including Britten's A Midsummer Night's Dream, Stravinsky's The Rake’s Progress, and works by Luciano Berio and Georges Aperghis.

== Life and career ==
Born Louis Jean Marie Camerlo in Lyon on 26 April 1929, he trained in electrical engineering at the Lycée de la Martinière. His uncle, Paul Camerlo, helped him to a position as stage director at the Opéra de Lyon. He was director of the opera house from 1969 to 1995, where he taught numerous young talents, such as baritone Jean-Philippe Lafont. His era would be named Opéra Nouveau, with innovations such as repertoire including neglected Baroque operas and a focus on stage action. In 1980 Jean-Pierre Brossmann became co-director. Erlo and conductor Serge Baudo then presented Les Troyens by Berlioz as part of a Berlioz Festival that attracted visitors from Paris, beginning a transformation of the Opéra de Lyon to a major European stage. The orchestra was enlarged and a workshop for singers was installed. The house produced around 80 recordings of operas during his time there. He staged several productions himself, such as Prokofiev’s The Love for Three Oranges.

Erlo was also director of the studio of the Paris Opera from 1973 to 1979, while Rolf Liebermann directed the opera. In 1983, he was on the jury to select the architect for the planned Opéra Bastille.

He was director of the Aix-en-Provence Festival from 1982 to 1996. When he took up the office, he said in an interview that he had "discovered" the festival in 1952, and that it should "remain the cradle of operatic innovation". In his first season, the festival gave the scenic world premiere of Rameau's last opera, Les Boréades, with John Eliot Gardiner conducting the English Baroque Soloists and Monteverdi Choir; Jean-Louis Martinoty was the director, and Catherine Turocy provided the essential dance with her New York Baroque Dance Company. In 1983 the festival featured Rameau's Hippolyte et Aricie with Jessye Norman as Phèdre.

Erlo made Mozart another focus of the festival, exploring especially his lesser known youthful operas, such as Mitridate, re di Ponto in 1983 and La finta giardiniera in 1984. In 1985, a complete rebuilding of the open-air theatre made it possible to stage larger operas; Ariadne auf Naxos by R. Strauss was given, and in 1987, the same composer's Der Rosenkavalier, conducted by Semyon Bychkov. Erlo himself directed The Love for Three Oranges in 1989, with Alain Maratrat and conducted by Kent Nagano. Purcell's The Fairy-Queen was given in 1989, conducted by William Christie and directed by Adrian Noble, and Britten's A Midsummer Night's Dream followed in 1991, staged by Robert Carsen. Another 20th-century work was staged in 1992, Stravinsky's The Rake’s Progress. Erlo also programmed contemporary operas by Luciano Berio, Georges Aperghis and Claude Prey.

In retirement, Erlo lived in Olmeto, Corsica, for several years.

Erlo died in Olmeto on 2 October 2026, at the age of 97.
