= Il Boemo =

2022 film by Petr Václav

- Directed by: Petr Václav
- Screenplay by: Petr Václav
- Produced by: Jan Macola
- Starring: Vojtěch Dyk; Elena Radonicich; Lana Vlady; Barbara Ronchi; Karel Roden
- Cinematography: Diego Romero
- Edited by: Paolo Cottignola; Florent Mangeot; Florent Vassault
- Release date: 19 September 2022 (Zinemaldia)
- Running time: 140 minutes
- Countries: Czech Republic; Italy; Slovakia
- Languages: Italian; German; Czech
- Budget: CZK120 million; (est. $5.7 million)
- Box office: $1,301,681

Il Boemo (lit. 'the Bohemian') is a 2022 period biographical drama film about the life and career of the Czech composer Josef Mysliveček (1737–1781), written and directed by Petr Václav. Mysliveček was one of the most acclaimed and prolific composers of opera seria in Italy in the second half of the eighteenth century, and mentor and friend to Wolfgang Amadeus Mozart. The film stars Vojtěch Dyk, Elena Radonicich, Barbara Ronchi, and Lana Vlady. The music for the film has been recorded by the Czech ensemble Collegium 1704 led by Václav Luks, featuring international soloists such as Philippe Jaroussky, Emöke Baráth, Raffaella Milanesi, Juan Sancho and Simona Šaturová. It was selected as the Czech entry for the Best International Feature Film at the 95th Academy Awards. It premiered at 70th San Sebastián International Film Festival on 19 September 2022.

== Synopsis ==
The film begins with Mysliveček at the end of his life, in dire straits and wearing a mask to conceal the ravages of tertiary syphilis that have destroyed his face. The film then flashes back to outset of his musical career as a young man in Venice.

The son of a Prague miller, who expected him to follow in his footsteps, Mysliveček realizes his dream of becoming a famous composer in Italy, known as Il Boemo (the Bohemian, i.e. Czech), as his talent and quiet charisma bring him to the attention of a series of wealthy and royal patrons. In 1770 he meets the young Wolfgang Amadeus Mozart in Bologna. During the 1770s, he is at his most prolific, composing numerous works in the genre of Italian opera seria. Even as his illness begins to destroy his body and his face, his career reaches its pinnacle with the 1778 premiere in Naples of his opera L'Olimpiade.

== Cast ==
- Vojtěch Dyk as Josef Mysliveček
- Barbara Ronchi as Caterina Gabrielli
- Lana Vladi as Anna Fracassati
- Elena Radonicich as marchesa
- Diego Pagotto as Orfeo Crispi
- Philip Hahn as Wolfgang Amadeus Mozart
- Salvatore Langella as Conte di San Paolo
- Philippe Jaroussky
- Lino Musella
- Martina Babišová
- Raffaella Milanesi
- Juan Sancho
- Emőke Baráth
- Karel Roden
- Zdeněk Godla
- Simona Šaturová
- Krystian Adam
- Giulia Semenzano
- Sophie Harmsen
- Benno Schachtner

== Production ==
The film is co-produced by the Czech Republic, Italy, and Slovakia, and was supported, among others, by the Czech Film Fund, the Italian Ministry of Culture, and the Slovak Audiovisual Fund; the producer is Jan Macola and Mimesis Film, the co-producers are Marco Alessio (Dugong Film) in Italy, Marek Urban (sentimentalfilm) in Slovakia, and Czech Television and MagicLab in the Czech Republic.

Petr Václav has singled out Stanley Kubrick’s Barry Lyndon, in relation to camera work, lighting, and narrative style, and Miloš Forman’s Amadeus, in terms of working with opera and music, as particular cinematic references.

== Filming locations ==
Shooting locations in the Czech Republic included the Estates Theatre, the Martinic Palace and the Colloredo–Mansfeld Palace in Prague, the château at Jaroměřice nad Rokytnou, the Doksany Convent and the Cistercian monastery in Plasy, and the Mahen Theater in Brno.

== Music ==
The music for the film has been recorded by the Czech ensemble Collegium 1704, founder and conductor Václav Luks also served as musical advisor for the film. The soundtrack was released by Warner Classics on their Erato label on 23 June 2023. Another advisor was the American musicologist Daniel E. Freeman, author of the first modern monograph on Mysliveček.

== Reception ==
The film was selected for screening at the 70th San Sebastián International Film Festival's main competition on 19 September 2022.

Il Boemo received the Czech Lion Award for Best Film of 2022 and was the Czech submission to the 95th Academy Awards for Best International Feature Film.

As of July 2025, Il Boemo has grossed $1,301,681 worldwide against a production budget of about $5.7 million.

== See also ==
- Czech Lion Award for Best Film
- List of submissions to the 95th Academy Awards for Best International Feature Film
- List of Czech submissions for the Academy Award for Best International Feature Film
