= Daniel E. Freeman =

American musicologist

- Born: 27 April 1959 (age 67); Everett, Washington

Daniel Evan Freeman (born 27 April 1959) is an American musicologist who specializes in European art music of the eighteenth century, in particular the musical culture of eighteenth-century Prague and the Bohemian lands. He is active as a pianist, author and music editor and was also a professor, teaching music history at several U.S. universities.

== Biography ==
He was born in Everett, Washington, but raised in Merrill, Wisconsin, from early childhood. He earned a B.Mus. degree in piano performance at the University of Wisconsin–Madison in 1981 and also studied piano as a non-degree candidate at Indiana University with James Tocco. He studied musicology at the University of Illinois at Urbana-Champaign (M.Mus, 1983, Ph.D., 1987), where his teachers included Bruno Nettl, John Walter Hill, Nicholas Temperley, and Herbert Kellman. His dissertation "The Opera Theater of Count Franz Anton von Sporck in Prague (1724–1735)" was revised and published in 1992 as the first monograph devoted to the musical cultural of eighteenth-century Prague or the Bohemian lands ever written in English. This work has been followed by two other books concerned with music-making in eighteenth-century Prague: Josef Mysliveček, "Il Boemo" (2009) and Mozart in Prague (2013). No other musicologist of any nationality has succeeded in completing three separate monographs on the same subject matter.

Freeman's biography of Josef Mysliveček is partially the basis (along with material from the 2015 documentary film Zpověď zapomenutého) of the screenplay for the film Il Boemo (2022), written by Czech film director Petr Václav. The film was selected by the Czech Republic as its entry for Best International Feature Film at the 95th Academy Awards.

Freeman has taught music history at the University of Illinois, the University of Southern California, and the University of Minnesota, where he is a lecturer and has also served as a ballet accompanist for the dance department. Between 2002 and 2023, he appeared frequently as a resident associate of the Smithsonian Institution. His research has been supported by grants from the International Research & Exchanges Board, the American Council of Learned Societies, the Newberry Library, and the National Endowment for the Humanities. Besides his monographs, Freeman has published essays on Italian opera of the seventeenth and eighteenth centuries, eighteenth-century keyboard music, and the music of Wolfgang Amadeus Mozart, Johann Sebastian Bach, the Bach sons, Antonio Vivaldi, and Josquin des Prez. He has also published editions of the music of Josef Mysliveček and Giovanni Benedetto Platti and was a contributor to the New Grove Dictionary of Opera (1992) and the revised New Grove Dictionary of Music and Musicians (2001).

Freeman's essay "An 18th-Century Singer’s Commission of ‘Baggage’ Arias," originally published in the journal Early Music in 1992, was re-printed as a classic study about baroque opera in Opera Remade, 1700–1750 (Farnham: Ashgate, 2010).

In October 2022, Freeman was awarded a silver medal from the Faculty of Arts of Charles University in Prague for his efforts in promoting the music of Czech composers outside of the Czech homelands.

== Books ==
- The Opera Theater of Count Franz Anton von Sporck in Prague (1992), ISBN 0945193173
- Josef Mysliveček, "Il Boemo" (2009), ISBN 0899901484; condensed version in Czech as Il Boemo: průvodce po životě a díle Josefa Myslivečka, translated by Petra Johana Poncarová (2021), ISBN 9788076015432; updated full biography in Czech as Josef Mysliveček, translated by Petra Johana Poncarová (2022), ISBN 9788076017160; revised, updated edition in English (2022), ISBN 1950743977
- Mozart in Prague (2013), ISBN 0979422310; revised, updated edition (2021), ISBN 1950743500
