= Kubrick (disambiguation) =

Stanley Kubrick (1928–1999) was an American film director who did most of his work as an expatriate in the United Kingdom.

Kubrick may also refer to:

== Astronomy ==
- 10221 Kubrick, an asteroid
- Kubrick Mons, a mountain peak on Pluto's moon Charon

== People ==
- Vivian Kubrick (born 1960), filmmaker and composer, daughter of Stanley Kubrick
- Christiane Kubrick (born 1932), artist and performer, wife of Stanley Kubrick

== Other uses ==
- Kubrick (toy), a Japanese toy
- Kubrick the Dog, a photography book by Sean Ellis
- Kubrick (album), a 2015 album by Soulsavers
- Fear Kubrick, the main female protagonist of the Japanese light novel series, C³
