= Ken Pierce =

American dancer

Ken Pierce is an American performer, teacher and historian of Renaissance and Baroque dance. He trained in ballet and modern dance at the American Ballet Theatre School and the Merce Cunningham studio. He has performed with the Court Dance Company of New York, the New York Baroque Dance Company, and Ris et Danceries (Paris). He directs the Ken Pierce Baroque Dance Company, collaborating with Tafelmusik, Portland Baroque Orchestra, Concerto Copenhagen, The King's Noyse and the Boston Early Music Festival. He was assistant choreographer for Quelques pas graves de Baptiste, Francine Lancelot's baroque-style piece for the Paris Opera Ballet, whose cast included Rudolph Nureyev. Pierce directs the early dance program at the Longy School of Music in Cambridge, Massachusetts.
