= Zpověď zapomenutého =

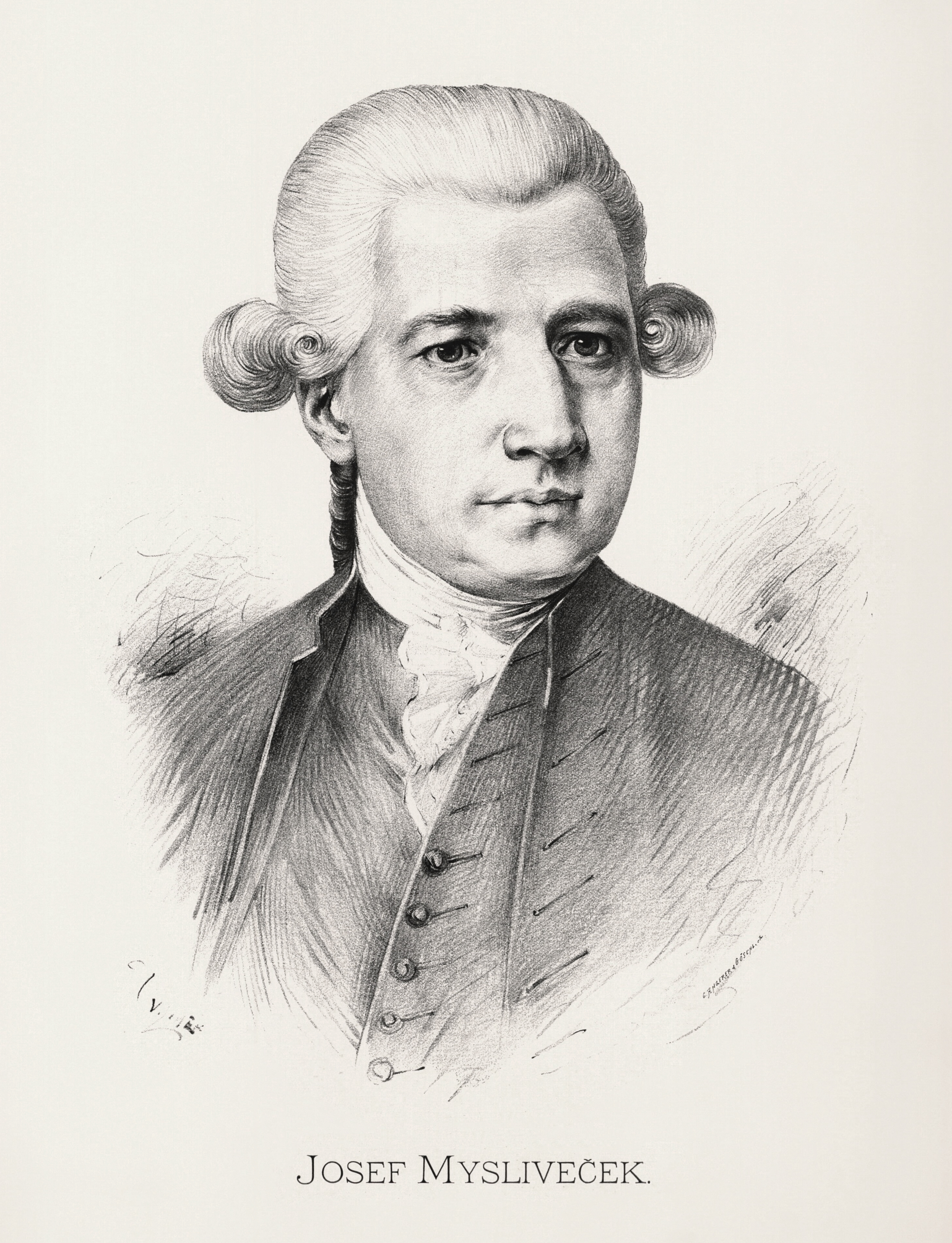
- Directed by: Petr Václav
- Written by: Petr Václav
- Produced by: Mimesis Film
- Starring: Karel Roden; Václav Luks; Collegium 1704
- Release date: April 2, 2015
- Country: Czech Republic
- Language: Czech

Zpověď zapomenutého is a 2015 documentary film by Petr Václav about the life of Czech-Italian composer Josef Mysliveček. When screened at the FIPA International Competition in Biarritz in 2016, the film won the gold prize (FIPA d'or). It is also the winner of the 2016 Trilobit Award. A biographical film based on the life of Mysliveček with the title Il Boemo was also developed, in collaboration with the Czech conductor Václav Luks, artistic director of the early music ensemble Collegium 1704, and released in 2022. Zpověď zapomenutého is narrated by Czech actor Karel Roden, who reads from personal letters and journal entries written by the composer.

According to Deník, "The film combines footage from Collegium 1704 rehearsals of Mysliveček's opera L'Olimpiade conducted by Luks in 2012 and 2013 at the Prague National Theatre, where the composer worked, and from various archives. Through letters, music, atmosphere and landscape, Václav reconstructs the life of a man who was a talented composer and an eternal wanderer with no background but also a lover of women and emoluments, which ultimately was his fatal undoing. Mysliveček's life journey and imaginary feelings, suggestively rendered by Karel Roden's pensive speech, illustrate the film's subject."

Moreover, Zpověď zapomenutého "captures the emergence of opera."

French historian and 18th century Naples specialist Mélanie Traversier was historical consultant on this documentary film.
