= Laurence Cummings =

British musician (born 1968)

Laurence Alexander Cummings OBE (born 1968) is a British harpsichordist, organist, and conductor. He is music director of the Academy of Ancient Music.

== Biography ==
Cummings was born in Birmingham and educated at Solihull School, Christ Church, Oxford and the Royal College of Music. His teachers have included Jill Severs. Cummings has played harpsichord and organ continuo with many leading period instrument groups, including Les Arts Florissants, The Sixteen Choir, the Gabrieli Consort and the Orchestra of the Age of Enlightenment.

Cummings was Head of Historical Performance at the Royal Academy of Music from 1997 to 2012. He has served as musical director of the London Handel Orchestra and the London Handel Festival (since 1999), musical director of the Tilford Bach Society, a founding member of the London Handel Players, and a Trustee of the Handel House Museum. In September 2011, he became the artistic director of the Göttingen International Handel Festival. He has also conducted at English National Opera and Glyndebourne. In November 2020, the Academy of Ancient Music announced the appointment of Cummings as its next music director, effective with the 2021–2022 season. Cummings also serves as music director and principal conductor (maestro titular) of the Orquestra Barroca Casa da Musica, in Porto.

Cummings was appointed Officer of the Order of the British Empire (OBE) in the 2024 New Year Honours for services to music.

== Recordings ==
Cummings has recorded commercially as both an instrumentalist and a conductor. His recordings as a conductor have included the first recording of Handel's newly discovered Gloria with soloist Emma Kirkby and the Royal Academy of Music Baroque Orchestra. He has also made recordings of keyboard works of Louis and François Couperin, and Handel.

- Handel, George Frideric; Cummings, Laurence; Ohrwall, Anders; Kirkby, Emma; Martinpelto, Hillevi; Otter, Anne Sofie von; Adolf Fredriks Bachkör.; Drottningholms barockensemble; Royal Academy of Music (2005), HANDEL : Gloria, Hong Kong: Naxos Digital Services Ltd., OCLC 705282679
- Couperin, François; Cummings, Laurence (1996), Music for harpsichord (in no linguistic content), Munich: Naxos, OCLC 84400348
- Couperin, Louis; Cummings, Laurence (1994), Harpsichord suites : D Major, A Minor, C Major, F Major. Tombeau de M. de Blancrocher. Louis Couperin. Laurence Cummings, harpsichord (in undetermined language), Unterhaching, Munich: HNH Internat., OCLC 633502792
- Händel, Georg Friedrich; Bach, Johann Sebastian; Rameau, Jean-Philippe; Couperin, François; Byrd, William; Buxtehude, Diderik; Scarlatti, Domenico; Couperin, Louis; Soler, Antonio; Purcell, Henry; Forqueray, Antoine; Bach, Wilhelm Friedemann; Poulenc, Francis; Seixas, Carlos de; Beauséjour, Luc; Brown, Julia; Cuckston, Alan; Cummings, Laurence; Halász, Débora; Hambitzer, Gerald; Hoeren, Harald; Lewis, Christopher D.; Mortensen, Lars Ulrik; Rowland, Gilbert; Rübsam, Wolfgang; Wilson, Glen; Müller-Brühl, Helmut; Kölns Kammerorkester (2020), Handsome harpsichord best loved classical harpsichord music (in undetermined language), Naxos Rights (Europe) : [sælges på internettet], OCLC 1223536323

Cultural offices
Preceded by Nicholas McGegan	Artistic Director, Göttingen International Handel Festival; 2011–present	Succeeded by incumbent
Preceded by Richard Egarr	Music Director, Academy of Ancient Music; 2021–present	Succeeded by incumbent
