= Sean Ellis =

British movie director

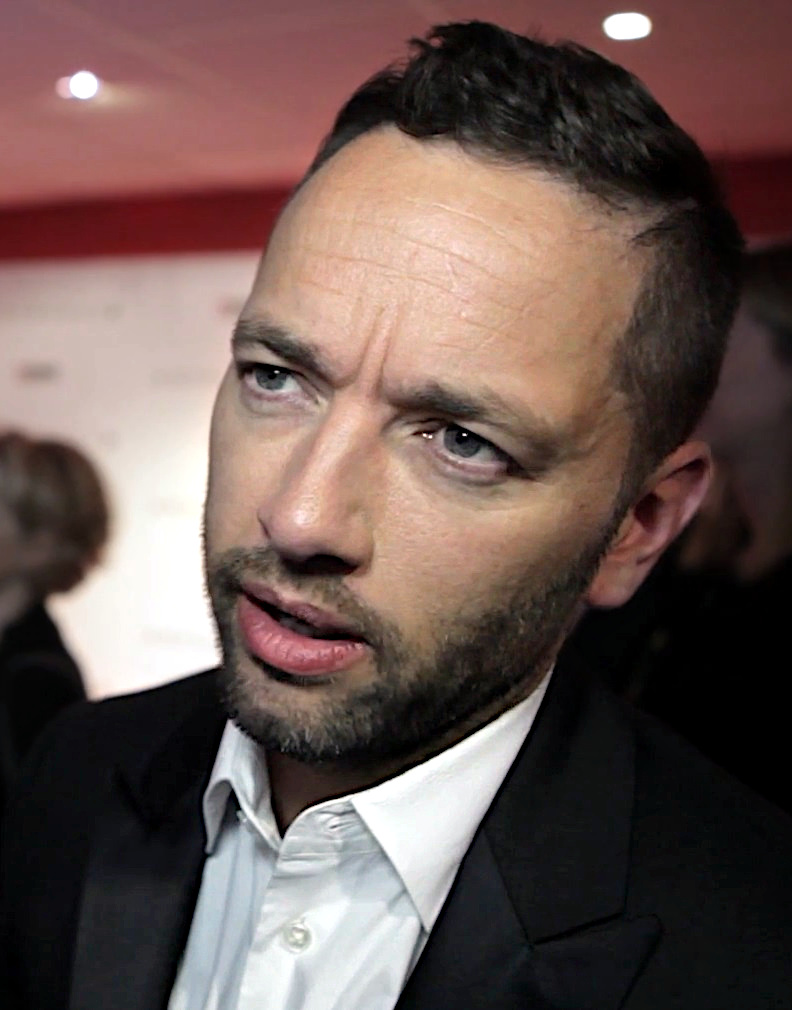
- Ellis at Anthropoid premiere ADIFF 2016
- Born: 1970 (age 55–56); Brighton, England
- Occupation: Filmmaker
- Years active: 1996–present

Sean Ellis (born 1970) is a British film director, writer, producer and fashion photographer. He is best known for his films Cashback (2004), the Tagalog-language film Metro Manila (2013), and Anthropoid (2016).

== Career ==
Ellis' photographs have appeared in fashion magazines including The Face and Vogue.

In 2006, he was nominated for an Academy Award in the category "Best Short Film, Live Action" for his film, Cashback. The feature film was produced more than a year after the original 2004 short film was completed. Following a decision in December 2005 to proceed with the feature, Ellis completed the expanded script in seven days. After getting commitments from his cast in March, he secured financing and the film went into production in May. This schedule was exceedingly condensed by modern filmmaking standards.

His next major film, The Broken, premiered on 18 January 2008 as part of the 2008 Sundance Film Festival. It also was the first choice in Horrorfest 2009 and was part of the 2008 Sitges Film Festival.

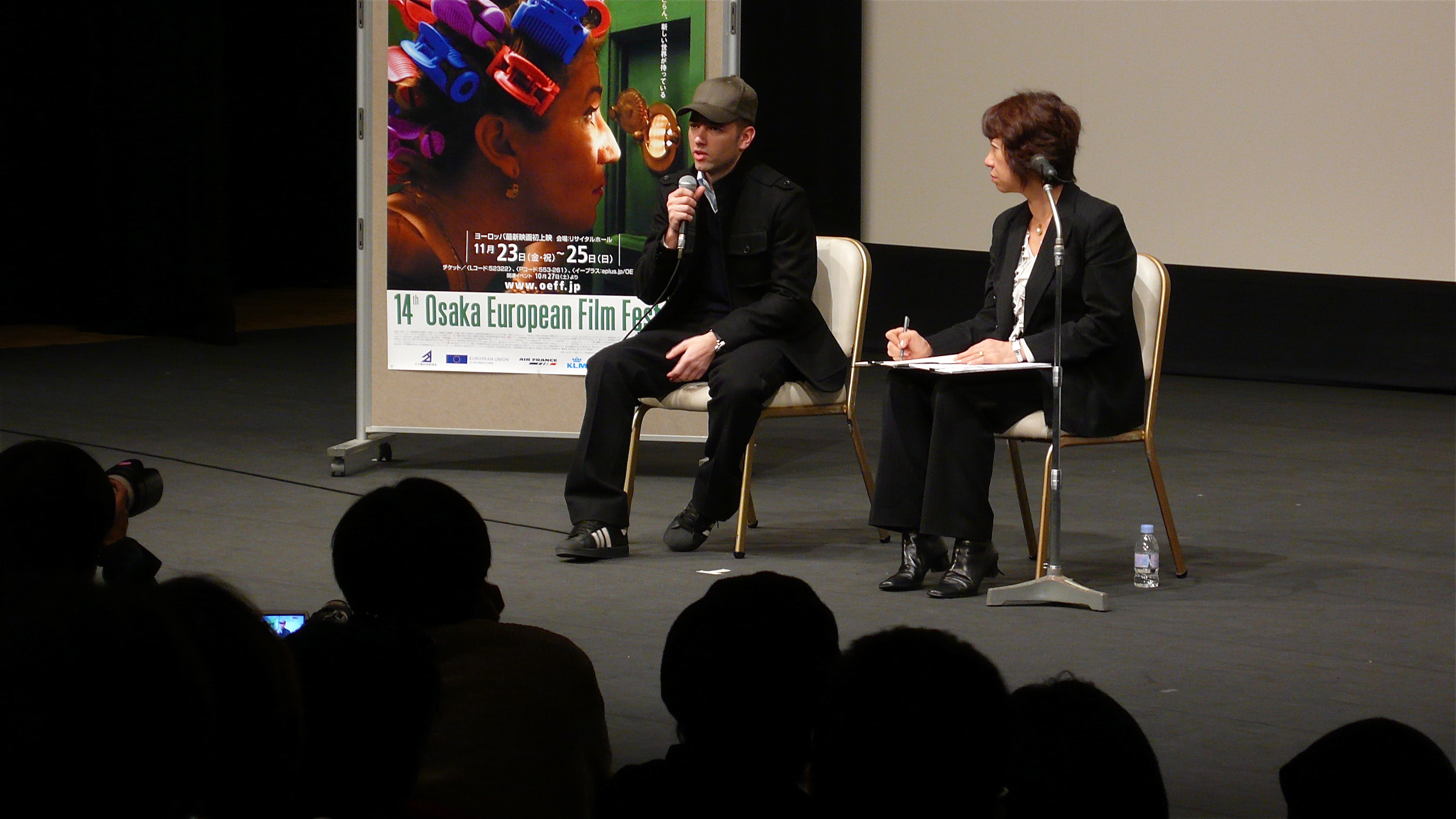
Ellis (left) at the Osaka European Film Festival 2007

In 2011, he published the photography book Kubrick the Dog, which he began compiling as a way to deal with his dog's death from canine lymphoma.

Ellis resides in London, England.

== Awards ==
Metro Manila picked up three trophies at the 2013 British Independent Film Awards, taking Best British Independent Film, Best Director for Sean Ellis and Best Achievement in Production.

== Filmography ==
Year	Title	Notes
2001	Left Turn	—N/a
2004	Cashback	Nominated: Academy Award (Best Short Film, Live Action); Won: Bermuda International Film Festival (Best Narrative Feature); Won: Brest European Short Film Festival (Grand Prix); Won: Chicago International Film Festival (Best Short Film); Won: Tribeca Film Festival (Best Narrative Short)
2005	Selected Shorts#2: European Award Winners	—N/a
2008	The Broken	Nominated: Catalan International Film Festival (Best Film)
2008	Voyage d'affaires (The Business Trip)	Won: Fuji Short Film Award (Best Short Film); Nominated: British Academy Film Award (Best Short Film) Nominated: BAFTA Award (Best Short Film)
2013	Metro Manila	Won: British Independent Film Awards (Best Director); Won: British Independent Film Awards (Best British Film); Won: British Independent Film Awards (Achievement in Production); Nominated: BAFTA Award (Best international Film)
2016	Anthropoid	Nominated: 2016 Czech Lion Awards (Best Film); Nominated: 2016 Czech Lion Awards (Best Director); Nominated: 2016 Czech Lion Awards (Cinematography)
2021	The Cursed	Nominated: Camerimage Golden Frog for outstanding Cinematography; Nominated: Catalan International Film Festival (Best Film); Nominated: Festival international du film fantastique de Gérardmer (Best Film)
2024	The Cut	—N/a
