= Victims and Murderers =

2000 film

- Directed by: Andrea Sedláčková
- Written by: Andrea Sedláčková
- Produced by: Ilona Jirásková
- Starring: Karel Roden
- Cinematography: Miro Gábor
- Distributed by: Fox21 Video
- Release date: 19 October 2000
- Running time: 96 minutes
- Country: Czech Republic
- Language: Czech

Victims and Murderers (Czech: Oběti a vrazi) is a 2000 Czech drama film directed by Andrea Sedláčková. It was entered into the 23rd Moscow International Film Festival.

== Cast ==
- Karel Roden as Miroslav
- Ivana Chýlková as Jana
- Monika Hilmerová as Young Jana
- Vladimír Skultéty as Young Miroslav
- Veronika Jeníková as Olga
- Daniela Kolářová as Mother
- Ján Sedal as Father
- Janko Kroner as Josef
- Bohumil Klepl as Ludvík (as Bob Klepl)
- Jiří Štěpnička as Doubrava
- Simona Stašová as Doubravová
- Anna Duchanová as Katerina
- Veronika Bellova as Lucie
