= Bejun Mehta =

American opera singer (born 1968)

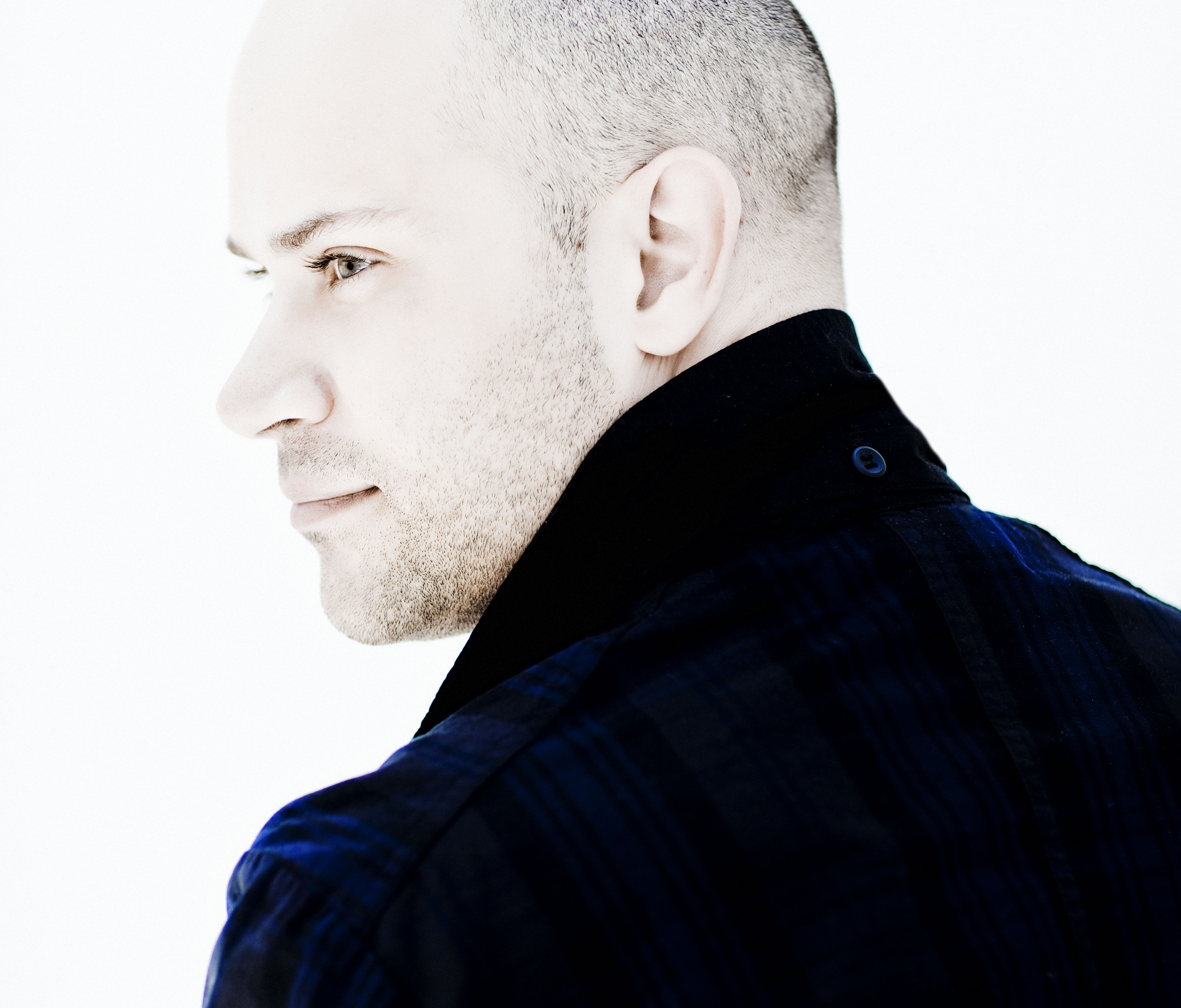
Bejun Mehta in 2010

Bejun Mehta (born 29 June 1968) is an American countertenor and voice teacher. He has been awarded the Echo Klassik, the Gramophone Award, Le Diamant d’Opera Magazine, the Choc de Classica, the Traetta Prize, and been nominated for the Grammy Award, the Laurence Olivier Award, and the Preis der Deutschen Schallplattenkritik. Writing in the Süddeutsche Zeitung, Michael Stallknecht called him "arguably the best counter tenor in the world today."

== Early life and family ==
Mehta was born in Laurinburg, North Carolina, and grew up in Ann Arbor, Michigan. His father, Dady Mehta, a pianist born in Shanghai, China, to Parsi parents from India, is a cousin of conductor Zubin Mehta. His father was professor of piano at Eastern Michigan University. His mother, Martha Ritchey Mehta of Altoona, Pennsylvania, was a soprano and journalist who worked in the development office of the University of Michigan Museum of Art, and she was her son's first voice teacher. His brother, Navroj Mehta, is a violinist and the artistic director of the Ventura Music Festival.

== Early musical career ==
From the age of nine through fifteen, Mehta was a solo boy soprano in concerts and recordings. Of his CD for the Delos label in 1983 (Bejun DE 3019), Leonard Bernstein commented, "It is hard to believe the richness and maturity of musical understanding in this adolescent boy." He was named by the magazine Stereo Review as the Debut Recording Artist of the Year.

After his voice changed, Mehta studied the cello, both as a soloist and orchestral player, under Aldo Parisot at Yale University. Mehta graduated from Yale University with a degree in German literature. At the same time he completed an internship at Delos, where he had recorded as a boy. This led to work as an independent recording producer for labels such as Sony/CBS, BMG/RCA, Deutsche Grammophon, and Delos. His production of Janos Starker’s final recording of Bach’s Cello Suites (BMG/RCA 61436) won the 1997 Grammy Award for Best Instrumental Soloist Performance without orchestra.

Mehta sang for several years as a baritone without much success. "I was average, just average," he said. He began to experiment with singing in the countertenor range after reading a 1997 New Yorker profile of the countertenor David Daniels, whose early experiences seemed to mirror his own.

In 1998 he attended the Music Academy of the West summer conservatory program, where Marilyn Horne, who knew of his work as a boy soprano, offered him sponsorship through the Marilyn Horne Foundation, an organization that works to develop new talent and preserve the art of song recital. He made his operatic debut as a countertenor that same year as Armindo in a New York City Opera production of Partenope by Handel. Two months later he substituted for David Daniels, who was taken ill during an international concert tour.

== Countertenor career ==
Mehta regularly performs the great roles of his repertoire with leading opera houses such as Covent Garden, Bavarian State Opera, Opéra National de Paris, Théâtre du Châtelet, La Scala, Theater an der Wien, Berlin State Opera, La Monnaie, Netherlands Opera, Barcelona's Liceu, Teatro Real in Madrid, Metropolitan Opera, Chicago Lyric Opera, Los Angeles Opera, San Francisco Opera, and New York City Opera. He has performed at the festivals of Salzburg, Glyndebourne, Edinburgh, Aix-en-Provence, and Verbier, and at the London BBC Proms.

Mehta performs programmes with repertoire ranging from Baroque to contemporary music. He has performed at Amsterdam's Concertgebouw, London's Wigmore Hall, the Konzerthaus, Vienna and the Wiener Musikverein, Carnegie Hall and Zankel Hall, New York, the 92nd Street Y, Centre for Fine Arts, Brussels, Valencia's Palau de les Arts Reina Sofia, Madrid's Teatro de la Zarzuela, Cité de la Musique, Paris, the Prinzregententheater Munich, and the festivals of Edinburgh, San Sebastian, Verbier, Schleswig-Holstein, and the BBC Proms in London. Mehta has also conducted the Belgian Baroque Orchestra B'Rock in concerts of Haydn and Mozart symphonies.

Mehta's operatic roles include, among many others: Orlando in Orlando, Tamerlano in Tamerlano, Giulio Cesare in Giulio Cesare, Bertarido in Rodelinda, Orfeo in Orfeo ed Euridice, Oberon in A Midsummer Night's Dream, Farnace in Mitridate, Didymus in Theodora, Hamor in Jephtha, Cyrus in Belshazzar, Arsamenes in Xerxes, Andronico in Tamerlano, Radamisto in Radamisto, Riccardo Primo in Riccardo Primo, Arsace in Partenope, Masha in Eötvös's Three Sisters, Ottone in Agrippina, and Emone in Antigone.

Bejun Mehta has been profiled by CBS (60 Minutes II), A&E (Breakfast with the Arts), ORF 2 (Austria), Arte (France), and ARD (Germany). He was nominated for the Olivier Award for his portrayal of Orlando at the Royal Opera House, Covent Garden. His main voice teachers have been Phyllis Curtin of Boston University (baritone) and Joan Patenaude-Yarnell of the Manhattan School of Music and Curtis Institute (countertenor).

The British composer George Benjamin wrote a lead role for him in his opera Written on Skin, which premiered in 2012 at Aix-en-Provence. In 2013 he gave a "visceral and beautifully-sung performance" in the world premiere recording of that opera. In 2014, Benjamin was at work on a new concert piece for Mehta that receives its world premiere in September 2015 at the Amsterdam Concertgebouw.

Mehta's CD Down by the Salley Gardens, a collection of English art song, was released in 2011 (with Julius Drake /Harmonia Mundi). Ombra Cara, Mehta's recording of Handel arias (Freiburg Baroque Orchestra/René Jacobs/Harmonia Mundi), was awarded the 2011 Echo Klassik as Opera Recording of the Year. Mehta's CDs and DVDs also include Agrippina (BBC Music Magazine's 2012 Opera Award and nominated for a Grammy as Best Opera Recording of the Year) and Belshazzar, both on Harmonia Mundi, Theodora (C-Major Entertainment/Unitel, shortlisted for the Preis der Deutschen Schallplattenkritik), Mitridate (Decca), Messiah (Unitel Classics), and Britten's A Midsummer Night's Dream (Glyndebourne Label), George Benjamin’s Written on Skin (Nimbus CD, BBC Magazine 2014 Premiere Recording of the Year), Benjamin's Written on Skin (Opus Arte DVD, 2013 Royal Opera House, 2014 Gramophone Award-Contemporary). Mehta's 2013 solo CD Che Puro Ciel (Akademie für Alte Musik Berlin/René Jacobs/Harmonia Mundi), a collection of classical arias and was awarded Le Diamant d’Opera Magazine, the Choc de Classica, and was shortlisted for the 2014 Gramophone Award in the Recital category. In 2014, Deutsche Grammophon/Archiv released a new complete studio recording of Orlando with Mehta in the title role (B’Rock/Jacobs), which was shortlisted for the Preis der Deutschen Schallplattenkritik. Also in 2014, ArtHaus released a theatrical film version of Gluck's Orfeo ed Euridice shot entirely on location at the Český Krumlov Theater in which Mehta both starred as Orfeo and was the artistic advisor. Mehta also appears on El Maestro Farinelli, Pablo Heras-Casado’s debut recording on Deutsche Grammophon/Archiv (2014), singing two of Farinelli's most notable arias.

== Discography ==
- Bejun. (Solo album). Arias and songs. Los Angeles Chamber Orchestra. Delos DE 3019
- Handel: Rinaldo. (Mago cristiano). Academy of Ancient Music, Christopher Hogwood. Decca CD 467087
- Handel: Giulio Cesare. (Tolomeo). Les Musiciens du Louvre, Marc Minkowski. Archiv Produktion CD 4742102
- Peter Eötvös: Trois Soeurs. (Masha). Théatre du Chatelet, Peter Eötvös. Chatelet DVD/TV
- Handel: Messiah. (Alto/Middle Brother). Fully staged production by Claus Guth, Ensemble Matheus, Jean-Christophe Spinosi, Theater an der Wien. Unitel/Classica DVD, C-Major Entertainment 703104
- Mozart: Mitridate. (Farnace). Les Musiciens du Louvre, Marc Minkowski, Salzburg Festival. Decca DVD, Unitel/3Sat
- Handel: Belshazzar. (Cyrus). Akademie für Alte Musik Berlin, René Jacobs. Harmonia Mundi HMD 9909028.29 (DVD)
- Handel: Theodora. (Didymus). Freiburg Baroque Orchestra, Ivor Bolton, Salzburg Festival. Unitel/Classica DVD, C-Major Entertainment A04001521
- Ombra Cara. (Solo album). Handel operatic arias. Freiburg Baroque Orchestra, René Jacobs. Harmonia Mundi HMC902077
- Down by the Salley Gardens. (Solo album). English songs. With Julius Drake. Harmonia Mundi HMC902093
- Handel: Agrippina. (Ottone). Akademie für Alte Musik Berlin, René Jacobs. Harmonia Mundi HMC902088.90
- Benjamin: Written on Skin. (Boy/Angel 1). Mahler Chamber Orchestra, George Benjamin. Nimbus NI5885 (CD)
- Benjamin: Written on Skin. (Boy/Angel 1). Orchestra of the Royal Opera House Covent Garden, George Benjamin. Opus Arte OA1125 D (DVD)
- Che puro ciel: The Rise of Classical Opera. (Solo album). Akademie für Alte Musik Berlin, René Jacobs. Harmonia Mundi HMC902172
- El Maestro Farinelli. (Soloist). Concerto Köln, Pablo Heras-Casado. DG/Archiv Produktion 479 2050
- Gluck: Orfeo ed Euridice. (Orfeo). Collegium 1704, Vaclav Luks. ArtHaus Musik DVD 102 184/108 103
- Handel: Orlando. (Orlando). B'Rock Orchestra, René Jacobs. DG/Archiv Produktion 479 2199
- CANTATA – yet can I hear ... Akademie für Alte Musik Berlin. PENTATONE PTC 5186669 (2018)
- Handel: Giulio Cesare. (Cesare). Concentus Musicus Wien, Ivor Bolton. Theater an der Wien. Unitel video (2021)
