= Richard Egarr =

British conductor

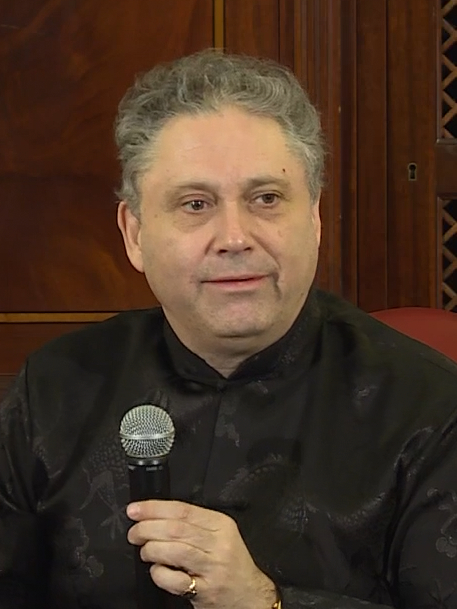
Egarr in 2017

Richard Egarr (born 7 August 1963) is a British conductor and keyboard player.

== Biography ==
Egarr interviewed by Anne McLean in 2017

=== Early life and education ===
Born in Lincoln, Egarr received his early musical training as a choirboy at York Minster and at Chetham's School of Music. He was an organ scholar of Clare College, Cambridge and studied at the Guildhall School of Music and Drama. Study with Gustav Leonhardt further inspired his work in the field of historically informed performance.

=== Musical career ===
==== Musician (soloist, keyboard) ====
Egarr is widely known as a specialist in the baroque repertoire, but has performed repertoire over a wide historical era, from fifteenth-century organ intabulations to Dussek and Chopin on early pianos, to Berg and Maxwell Davies on modern piano. He has recorded commercially several albums of solo keyboard music for such labels as Harmonia Mundi, as well as chamber repertoire for such labels as Hyperion.

==== Music director ====
In 2006, Egarr became music director of the Academy of Ancient Music (AAM). With the AAM, Egarr has made commercial recordings for such labels as Harmonia Mundi, and the AAM's own label. He concluded his tenure as AAM music director at the close of the 2020-2021 season.

Egarr made his Glyndebourne debut in 2007 with a staged version of Bach's St Matthew Passion.

In 2012, Egarr first guest-conducted the Philharmonia Baroque Orchestra (PBO). Following two additional guest appearances with the PBO, the PBO announced, in January 2019, the appointment of Egarr as its next music director, with an initial contract of 5 years. The original intention was for Egarr to serve as PBO music director-designate for the 2020-2021 season, and then to take the title of music director with the 2021-2022 season. In the wake of the COVID-19 pandemic, the PBO reconfigured its 2020-2021 season into a virtual season, and announced the advent of Egarr as its music director effective 1 July 2020, one season earlier than originally planned. Egarr concluded his tenure as PBO music director at the close of the 2023-2024 season and now has the title of music director laureate with the PBO.

Egarr and his family reside in Amsterdam. In Amsterdam, Egarr has served as director of the Academy of the Begijnhof. Since 2019, he is Principal Guest Conductor of the Residentie Orchestra in The Hague.

Cultural offices
Preceded by Christopher Hogwood	Music Director, Academy of Ancient Music; 2006–2021	Succeeded by Laurence Cummings
Preceded by Nicholas McGegan	Music Director, Philharmonia Baroque Orchestra; 2020–2024	Succeeded by Peter Whelan
