= Philharmonia Baroque Orchestra =

American orchestra (founded 1981)

- Orchestra
- Short name: PBO
- Founded: 1981, by Laurette Goldberg
- Location: San Francisco, California, U.S.
- Music director: Peter Whelan
- Website: philharmonia.org

The Philharmonia Baroque Orchestra (PBO) is an American orchestra based in San Francisco. It is dedicated to the historically informed performance of Baroque, classical, and Romantic music on original instruments. The orchestra performs its subscription series in the following cities and venues:

- San Francisco: Herbst Theatre
- Berkeley: First Congregational Church of Berkeley
- Stanford University: Bing Concert Hall
- Palo Alto: First United Methodist Church

== History ==
Laurette Goldberg, a harpsichordist, teacher, and pupil of Gustav Leonhardt, founded the PBO in 1981. She stepped down as the ensemble's music director in 1985 and chose Nicholas McGegan as her successor. McGegan served as music director from 1985 through 2020. During McGegan's tenure, the Philharmonia Chorale was established in 1995 as the affiliated chorus with the PBO, under the direction of John Butt; Butt was succeeded by Bruce Lamott the following season. McGegan now holds the title of music director laureate with the PBO.

In 2012, Richard Egarr first guest-conducted the PBO. Following two additional guest appearances, in January 2019, the PBO announced the appointment of Egarr as its next music director, with an initial contract of five years. The original intention was for Egarr to serve as music director designate for the 2020–2021 season, and then to take the title of music director with the 2021–2022 season. In the wake of the COVID-19 pandemic, the PBO reconfigured its 2020–2021 season into a virtual season and announced the advent of Egarr as its music director effective July 1, 2020, one season earlier than originally planned. Egarr concluded his tenure as its music director at the close of the 2023–2024 season.

In March 2025, Peter Whelan first guest-conducted the PBO. In June 2025, the PBO announced the appointment of Whelan as its next music director, effective with the 2026–2027 season, with an initial contract of three seasons.

== Collaborations ==
The PBO has collaborated with arts organisations such as Cal Performances, the Centre de Musique Baroque de Versailles, and The New York Baroque Dance Company, in the fully staged, modern-day premiere of Rameau's Le Temple de la Gloire in April 2017. The PBO regularly partners with the Mark Morris Dance Group.

== Recordings and Media ==
The PBO has commercially recorded for the recording labels Harmonia Mundi, Reference Recordings, BMG, and Avie. The ensemble initiated its own label, Philharmonia Baroque Productions, in 2011. On radio, the PBO has been regularly featured on KDFC-FM.

== Honors and awards ==
- 1991: Grammy Award for Best Choral Performance (Other than Opera), Handel: Susana
- 1991: Gramophone Award for Baroque Vocal, Handel: Susana
- 2004: "Ensemble of the Year" by Musical America
- 2012: Grammy nomination for Best Orchestral Performance, Haydn: Symphonies 104, 88 & 101

== Music directors ==
- Laurette Goldberg (1981–1985)
- Nicholas McGegan (1985–2020)
- Richard Egarr (2020–2024)
- Peter Whelan (designate, effective autumn 2026)
