= Opéra National de Lyon =

Opera company in Lyon, France

Opéra de Lyon
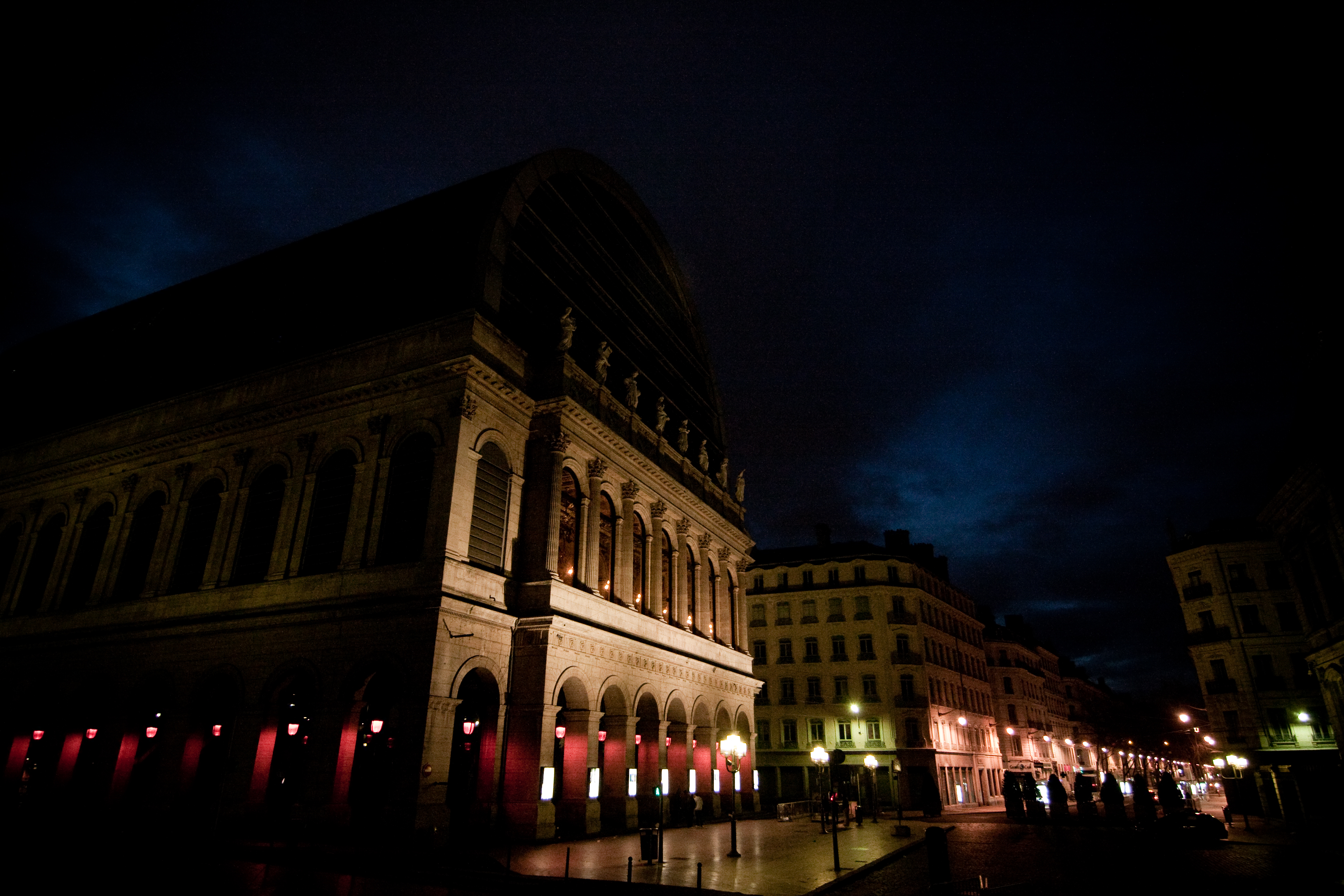
- Formation: 1831
- Type: Opera company
- Location: Lyon, France

The Opéra National de Lyon (French pronunciation: [ɔpeʁa nɑsjɔnal də ljɔ̃]), marketed as Opéra de Lyon during the last decade, is an opera company in Lyon, based and performing mostly at the Opéra Nouvel, an 1831 theatre that was modernised and architecturally transformed in 1993.

== History ==
The inaugural performance of Boïeldieu's La Dame blanche was given on 1 July 1831. The 19th and 20th centuries saw some significant French premieres of major operas including Wagner's Die Meistersinger in 1896, Giordano's Andrea Chénier in the following year, and Moussorgsky's Boris Godunov in 1913. In addition, many world premieres such as Schoenberg's Erwartung (1967) have been presented.

In the years after the 1969 appointment of Louis Erlo as general director, many innovative productions and premieres of both French operas and 20th-century operas have been staged. Two significant French artists who have been associated with the Opéra in recent years are the stage director Laurent Pelly, and the soprano, Natalie Dessay.

== Conductors ==
Past principal conductors at the company have included André Cluytens, John Eliot Gardiner, Kent Nagano, Louis Langrée, Iván Fischer, and Kazushi Ono. Since the start of the 2017–2018 season, the company's current principal conductor (chef permanent) of the company is Daniele Rustioni, whose appointment to the post was announced in March 2015. The current choirmaster of the company is Philip White, since 2015.

== Affiliated companies and status ==
The company has an affiliated corps de ballet, Lyon Opera Ballet. The company also has a children's choir, La Maîtrise, created in 1990 to form a top-level choir of young soloists. Since 1993, it has a status similar to other French musical schools.

== The opera house ==
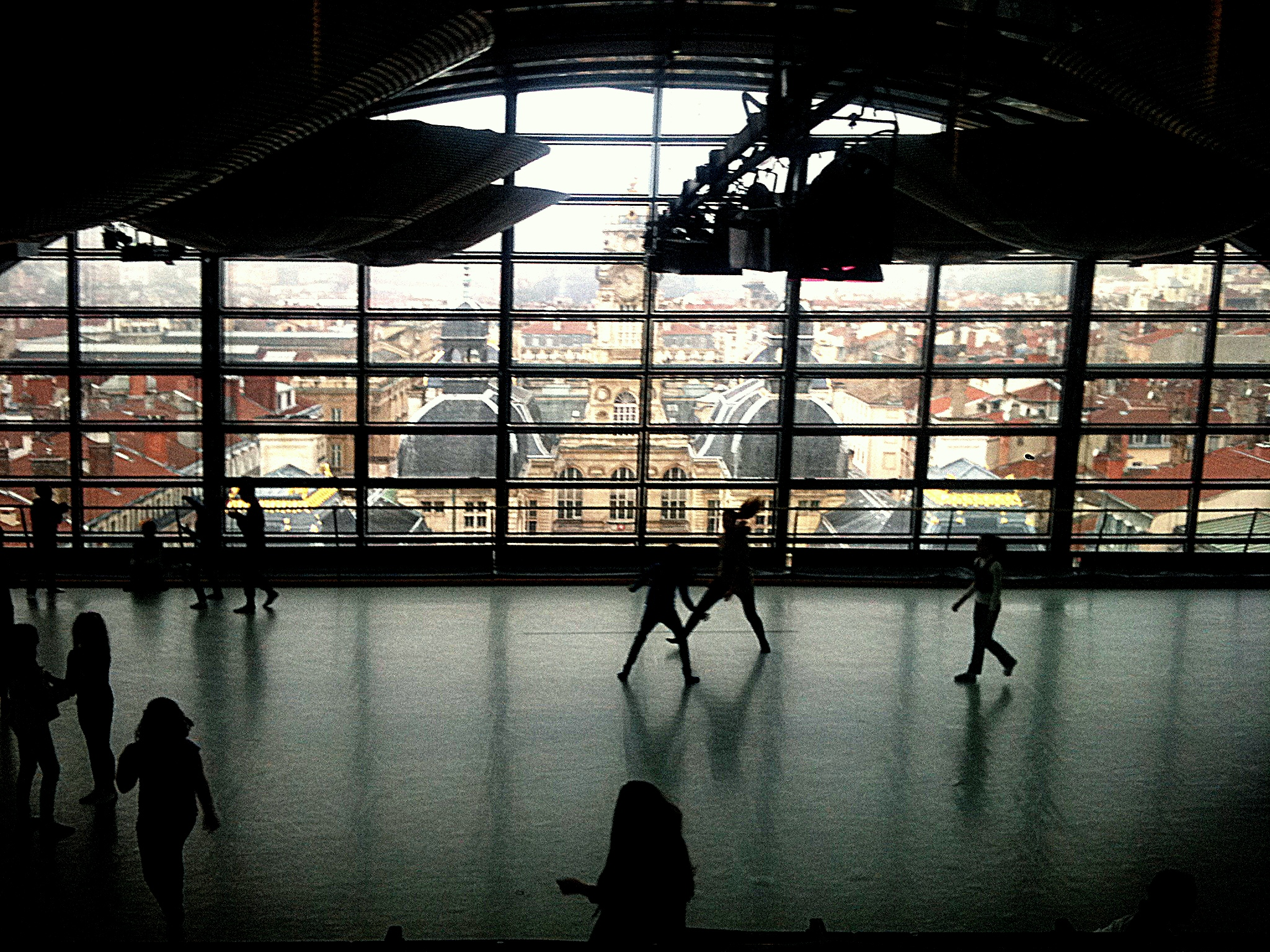
The ballet studio with its view of Lyon City Hall

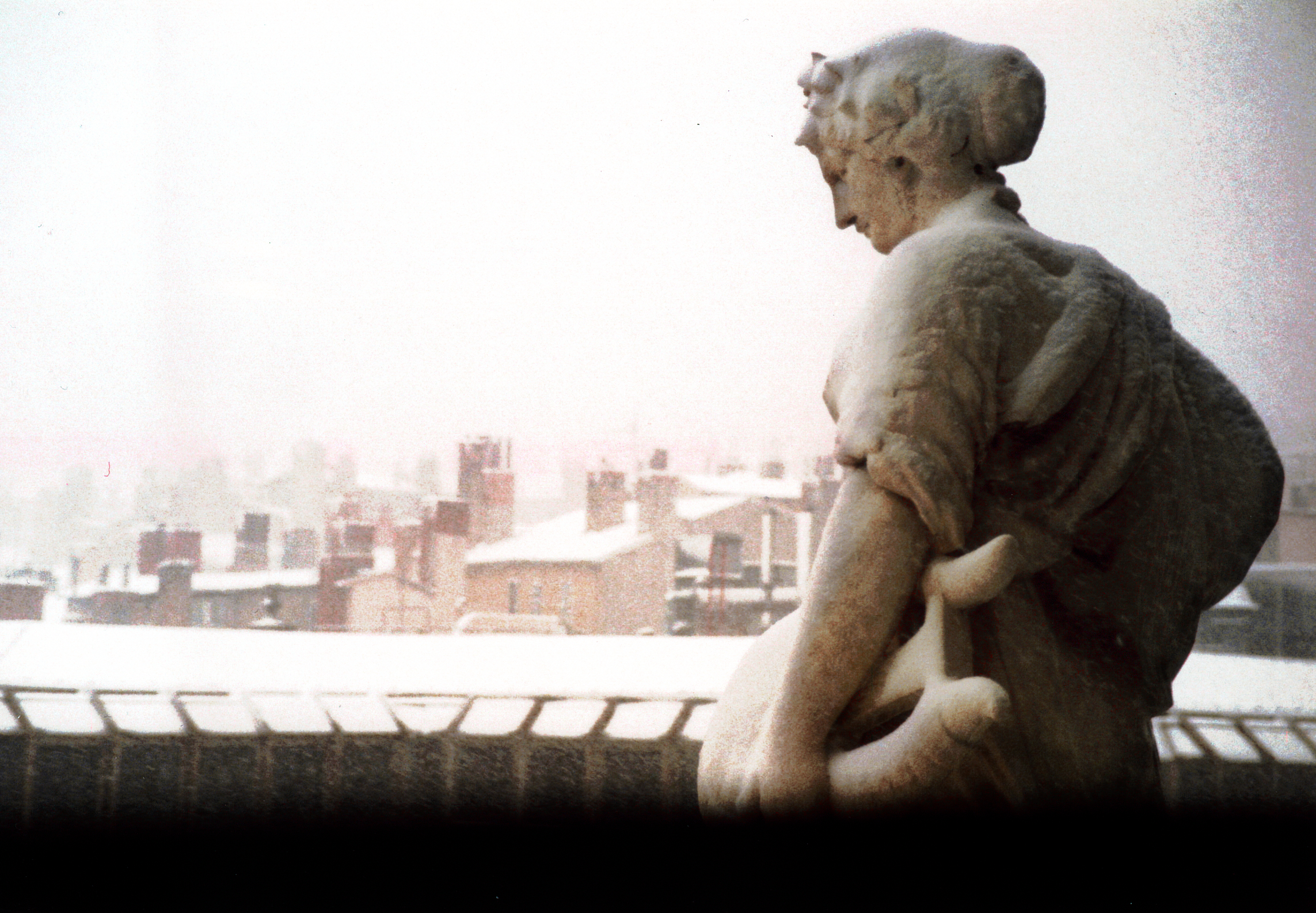
Euterpe looking down on the Pentes de la Croix-Rousse

A first theatre was built in Lyon by Soufflot during the 18th century, but it soon became too small, and the architects Chenavard and Pollet rebuilt a new house in a neo-classical style in 1830.

At the beginning of the 1980s, out of age and not meeting the needs any more, the Opera had to be renewed. A competition for architects was launched and won in 1986 by Jean Nouvel. The new Opera of Lyon was inaugurated in May 1993 and is now part of the international architectural heritage.

Nouvel only kept the outer walls of the former house. He also dug new underground levels and added a semi-cylindrical dome that is used by dancers.

The front facade features eight muses that were kept in place, but Uranie, the ninth one, was removed to respect the symmetry of the building.

== Principal conductors ==
- John Eliot Gardiner (1983–1988)
- Kent Nagano (1988–1998)
- Louis Langrée (1998–2000)
- Iván Fischer (2000–2003)
- Kazushi Ono (2008–2017)
- Daniele Rustioni (2017–2025)

== Awards ==
The company received the "Opera Company of the Year" award at the 2017 International Opera Awards.
