= Nicholas McGegan =

English conductor

James Nicholas McGegan OBE (born 14 January 1950 in Sawbridgeworth, Hertfordshire, England) is a British harpsichordist, flutist, conductor and early music expert.

== Biography ==
McGegan received his early education at Nottingham High School. He subsequently studied music at Corpus Christi College, Cambridge and at Magdalen College, Oxford. McGegan has participated in some of the earliest "authentic-performance" recordings during the 1970s as a baroque flautist, including Christopher Hogwood's seminal recordings of Mozart symphonies. He has taught music at such UK institutions as King's College, Cambridge, Oriel College, Oxford, and the Royal College of Music. From 1993 to 1998, he was Principal Guest Conductor of the Scottish Opera in Glasgow.

In the US, McGegan has served as artist-in-residence at Washington University in St. Louis, beginning in 1979, when he was initially scheduled for one semester in residence, but continued until 1985. McGegan first guest-conducted the St. Louis Symphony in 1986, and has since returned continuously as a guest conductor. In 1985, McGegan became music director of the Philharmonia Baroque Orchestra in San Francisco and Berkeley, California. In 1988, he served as music director of the Ojai Music Festival alongside Peter Maxwell Davies and Diane Wittry. Since 2013, he has been Principal Guest Conductor of the Pasadena Symphony. In October 2018, the Philharmonia Baroque Orchestra announced that McGegan is to stand down as its music director after the 2019–20 season, becoming music director laureate.

From 1991 to 2011, McGegan was artistic director of the Göttingen International Handel Festival. He was music director of the Irish Chamber Orchestra from 2002 to 2005. In 2014, he became artist-in-association with the Adelaide Symphony Orchestra. He has also held long-term appointments with the Drottningholm Theatre, where he served as principal conductor from 1993 to 1996, the Milwaukee Symphony Orchestra, and the Saint Paul Chamber Orchestra. McGegan also founded the chamber music group the Arcadian Academy.

McGegan has made more than 100 recordings, including many with Philharmonia Baroque and singers such as Lorraine Hunt Lieberson and Lisa Saffer, for such labels as Philharmonia Baroque Productions and harmonia mundi. In 2023, he conducted Cantata Collective's performance of Bach's St John Passion for Avie Records.

McGegan resides in Berkeley, California and Glasgow. He has collected a number of honors, including an honorary degree from the Royal College of Music in London; the Handel Prize from the Handel Festival in Halle, Germany; the honorary medal of the Friends of the Drottningholm Theatre; the Order of Merit of the State of Lower Saxony (Germany); the Medal of Honor of the City of Göttingen; and a declaration of Nicholas McGegan Day by the mayor of San Francisco in recognition of his work with Philharmonia Baroque. He was appointed Officer of the Order of the British Empire (OBE) in the 2010 Birthday Honours. He was nominated for a Grammy Award for his 2011 release on the orchestra's label of Joseph Haydn's Symphonies nos. 88, 101, and 104.

Cultural offices
Preceded by Laurette Goldberg	Music Director, Philharmonia Baroque Orchestra; 1985–2020	Succeeded by Richard Egarr
Preceded by John Eliot Gardiner	Artistic Director, Göttingen International Handel Festival; 1991–2011	Succeeded by Laurence Cummings
Preceded by Fionnuala Hunt	Music Director, Irish Chamber Orchestra; 2002–2005	Succeeded by Anthony Marwood (Artistic Director)
