= Kubrick the Dog =

Photography book by Sean Ellis

- Author: Sean Ellis
- Language: English
- Genre: Non-fiction
- Publisher: Schirmer Books
- Publication date: 28 February 2011
- Media type: Print
- Pages: 148 pages
- ISBN: 3829605056

Kubrick the Dog is a 2011 non-fiction photography book by British director Sean Ellis. The book was released on 28 February 2011 through Schirmer Books and focuses on the life of Ellis's dog Kubrick. Kubrick the Dog features several photos of Kubrick, a Hungarian Vizsla that Ellis adopted as a puppy in 1998, in several poses and with different people such as Stella McCartney.

Ellis began working on the book in 2010 after Kubrick's death by canine lymphoma as a way of working through his grief over the dog's death.

== Reception ==
Critical reception for the book was mostly positive. Basler Zeitung gave an overall positive review, stating that although some of the photographs felt a little deliberate, the book was also stirring.
