= We Are Never Alone =

2015 film

- Film poster
- Directed by: Petr Vaclav
- Written by: Petr Vaclav
- Starring: Klaudia Dudová
- Release dates: 14 February 2016 (Berlin); 7 April 2016 (Czech Republic)
- Running time: 115 minutes
- Country: Czech Republic
- Language: Czech

We Are Never Alone (Czech: Nikdy nejsme sami) is a 2016 Czech drama film directed by Petr Vaclav. It was selected to be screened in the Contemporary World Cinema section at the 2016 Toronto International Film Festival.

== Cast ==
- Klaudia Dudová
- Zdeněk Godla
- Miroslav Hanuš
- Karel Roden
- Lenka Vlasáková
