= The Oddsockeaters =

- Directed by: Galina Miklínová
- Produced by: Ondřej Trojan
- Release date: 22 October 2016 (Czech Republic)
- Running time: 83 minutes
- Countries: Czech Republic; Slovakia; Croatia
- Language: Czech
- Box office: 36.549.842 CZK

The Oddsockeaters (Czech: Lichožrouti) is a 2016 Czech computer-animated musical action comedy film. It is an adaptation of a novel of the same name. The film was nominated for Czech Lion Award for the Best Sound and Stage Design.

== Synopsis ==
The fates of the main protagonists of the Oddsockeaters and their biggest opponent, the weirdo and the abandoned Professor, are connected by the story of the main character, the young Oddsockeater Hihlík, who will have great adventures in the film. The days of his grandfather Lamor, who had raised him, are over, and Hihlík must overcome his fear, climb out the window and go looking for Uncle Padre, about whom he had no idea yet. He draws his courage from what his grandfather instilled in him - love for his family, a good upbringing and a tenor. He does not abandon his ideals and principles even in the new robbery home of his mafia uncle and two sly cousins. Even though they lead him into dangerous situations. When, in the end, with a heavy heart, he breaks the two basic scavengers of the rules "Never take a couple" and "Stay people, but stay away from them," then only because he believes he has exhausted all means to reach his desired goal - family.

In the area of the animated adventurous gangster story of two hostile lichen-eating gangs, a clash of two generations and two morals, a human-like world is depicted.

== Voice cast ==
Character	Actor		
Character	Czech	English	
Character	Czech	Rename	Actor
Hihlík	Kryštof Hádek	Hugo	Christian Vandepas
Padre	Ondřej Trojan	Big Boss	Gregg Weiner
Tulamor	Jan Maxián	Tulamor	Clay Cartland
Ramses	David Novotný	Rameses	Eric Anderson
René Kadeřábek	Josef Somr	Professor	Avi Hoffman
Kudla Dederon	Marek Taclík	Spike Reisser	Rayner Garranchan
Žiletka	Tatiana Vilhelmova	Bladette	Paula Barros

== Technology ==
Prior to the actual implementation, the development of Oddsockeater figures was necessary, with a physiognomy completely different from vertebrates. It was necessary to develop and test especially their movement and lipsynch - the connection of the mouth and nose, which will determine and significantly affect the facial expressions of their face.

The technology used to make the film is CGI, computer-generated-imagery. The choice of computer animation was a logical outcome. In one of the two main plot levels, the film deals with the question of the existence of the sock eaters as a species. And it is this kind of animation that allows realistic processing to maintain a delicate balance between believability and fiction and make great use of it for the physical character of sock eaters, which are not made of flesh and bones - they feed on socks. Sock eaters consist of textile materials. CGI programs allowed figures to stretch, translucent, tangle.

Preparatory work took place in the years 2012–2013, the shooting itself 2014–2016. Galina Miklínová, as the author of the original illustration of Oddsockeaters as an "animal species", wanted to preserve her artistic intention - to distinguish herself with authentic drawings from ordinary production using 3D technology, and all modeled objects covered with the produced textures were hand-drawn.

Film premiere on October 20, 2016.
