= Akademie für Alte Musik Berlin =

German period-instrument orchestra

- Chamber orchestra
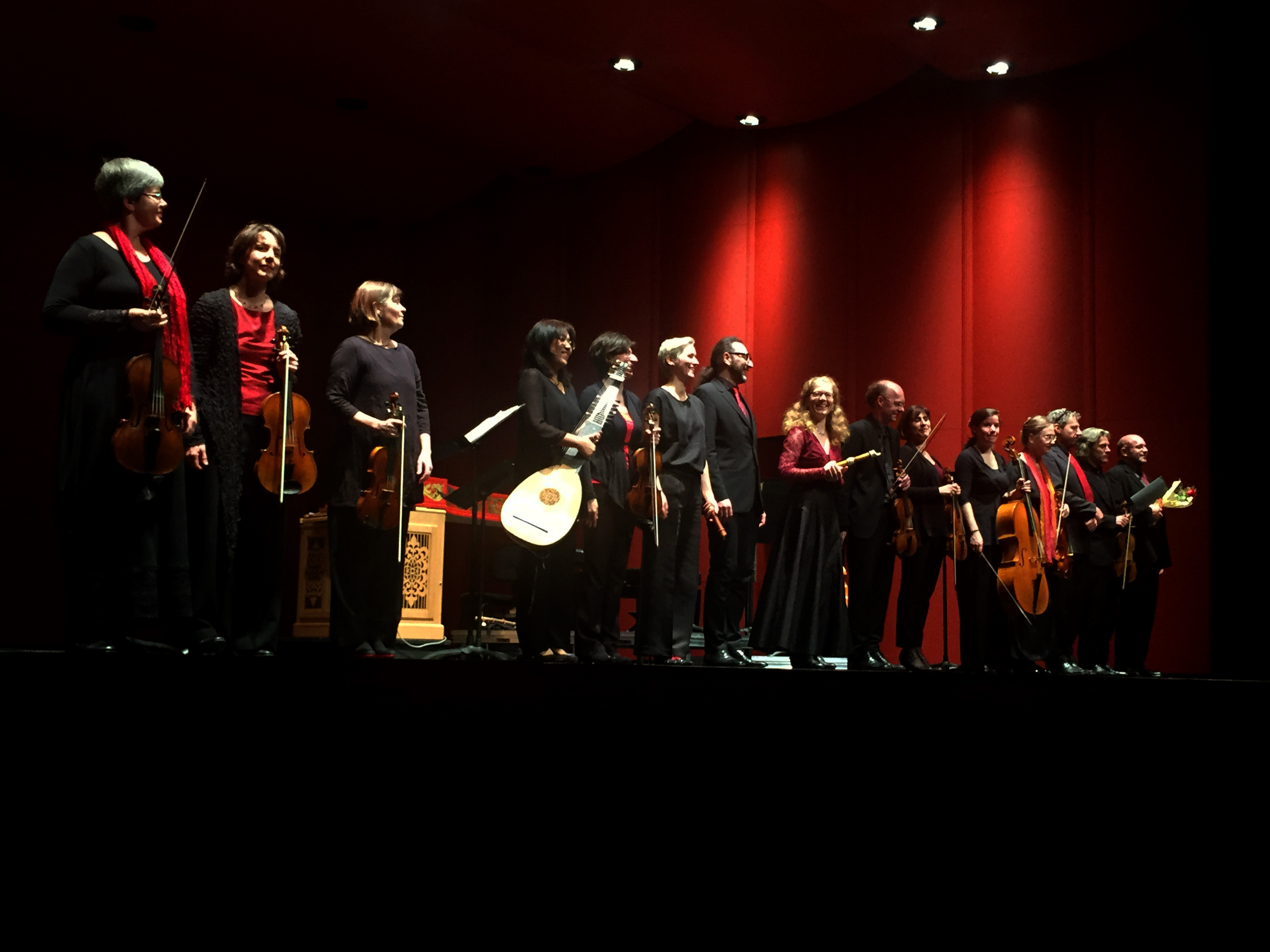
- The orchestra at the Centre cultural l'Atlàntida de Vic in 2015
- Native name: Akademie für Alte Musik Berlin
- Founded: 1982
- Location: Berlin, Germany
- Website: www.akamus.de

Akademie für Alte Musik Berlin (Academy for Early Music Berlin, short name: Akamus) is a German chamber orchestra founded in East Berlin in 1982. Each year Akamus gives approximately 100 concerts, ranging from small chamber works to large-scale symphonic pieces in Europe's musical centers as well as on tours in Asia, North America and South America.

== History ==
Two years after its founding in 1982, Akamus had its first concert series in what was then the Berlin Schauspielhaus am Gendarmenmarkt, today's concert hall, which continues to this day as a concert subscription. In 1985, the ensemble's first album was released by Eterna and Capriccio in both parts of Germany. After the fall of the Berlin Wall, the academy's international importance continued to develop through fruitful contacts with musicians beyond the now fallen Iron Curtain and numerous tours through Europe, Asia, South and North America.

A milestone was the close collaboration that began in 1992 with the RIAS Kammerchor and its then chief conductor Marcus Creed, which continued under his successors Daniel Reuss and Hans-Christoph Rademann and Justin Doyle. There is also close cooperation with the Bavarian Radio Choir under the current artistic direction of Howard Arman.

== The orchestra today ==
About 30 musicians form the core of the orchestra. They perform under the leadership of their four concertmasters Midori Seiler, Stephan Mai, Bernhard Forck and Georg Kallweit or guest conductors like René Jacobs, Marcus Creed, Daniel Reuss, Peter Dijkstra and Hans-Christoph Rademann.

Recording exclusively for Harmonia Mundi France since 1994, the ensemble’s CDs have earned many international prizes, including the Grammy Award, the Diapason d'Or, the Cannes Classical Award, the Gramophone Award and the Edison Award. In 2011 the recording of Mozart's Magic Flute was honoured with the German Record Critics' Award. In 2006 the Recorder Concertos by G. Ph. Telemann with Maurice Steger (CD HMF) have received a number of the most important international awards.

Ever since the reopening of the Berlin Konzerthaus in 1984, the ensemble has its own concert series in Germany’s capital. Furthermore, it has regularly been guest at the Berlin Staatsoper Unter den Linden, Berliner Philharmonie, De Nederlandse Opera in Amsterdam, at the Innsbruck Festival of Early Music and the Carnegie Hall New York. The ensemble works regularly with the RIAS Kammerchor as well as with soloists like Cecilia Bartoli, Andreas Scholl, Sandrine Piau and Bejun Mehta.

Moreover, Akamus has extended its artistic boundaries to work together with the modern dance company Sasha Waltz & Guests for productions of Dido and Aeneas (music: Henry Purcell) and Medea (music: Pascal Dusapin).

== Awards ==
- Grammy for Christoph Willibald Gluck: Italian Arias with Cecilia Bartoli, 2002
- International Classical Music Awards for Wolfgang Amadeus Mozart Magic Flute, 2011
- Preis der deutschen Schallplattenkritik for Georg Philipp Telemann: Orpheus (René Jacobs), 1998; Arias for Farinelli, with Vivica Genaux, 2002 and Wolfgang Amadeus Mozart Die Zauberflöte (René Jacobs), 2011
- Choc du Monde de la Musique for Johann Sebastian Bach: Geistliche Kantaten, 1996; Johann Sebastian Bach: Christmas Oratorio, 1997; Arias for Farinelli, 2002; Carl Philipp Emanuel Bach: Sinfonias and Concertos, 2001; Johann Sebastian Bach: Motets, with RIAS-Kammerchor, 2005; Georg Philipp Telemann: Recorder concertos with Maurice Steger, 2006 and Antonio Vivaldi: Double concertos, 2007
- Choc de Classica for Georg Philipp Telemann: Brockes-Passion, 2009 and Wolfgang Amadeus Mozart Magic Flute, 2011
- Diapason d’Or for Alessandro Scarlatti: Il primo omicidio, 1998; Georg Philipp Telemann: La Chasse, 1999; Georg Philipp Telemann: Recorder concertos, 2006; and Reinhard Keiser: Croesus (René Jacobs), 2000; Johann Sebastian Bach: Motets, 2005 and Johann Ludwig Bach: Trauermusik, 2011
- Edison Classical Music Award for Georg Philipp Telemann: La Chasse, 1999 and Reinhard Keiser: Croesus, 2000
- Gramophone Award for Alessandro Scarlatti: Il primo omicidio, 1998 and Georg Friedrich Händel: Ombra mai fù with Andreas Scholl, 1999
- MIDEM Classical Award for Georg Friedrich Händel: Ombra mai fù, 1999
- Georg-Philipp-Telemann-Preis der Landeshauptstadt Magdeburg, 2006
