= Klaudia Dudová =

Czech actress

- Born: 2 September 1988 (age 37); Levice, Czechoslovakia
- Occupation: Actress
- Years active: 2014–present

Klaudia Dudová (born 2 September 1988) is a Czech actress of Roma origin. Dudová starred in the award-winning film The Way Out.

== Biography ==
Dudová was born in Levice, Czechoslovakia, and then her parents moved to Brno and then to Ústí nad Labem. Her mother was a baker and her father worked in a factory. Dudová has a sister and a brother. During elementary school, Dudová was a part of the Jeketana dance club, with which she won Roma competitions and festivals. After elementary school, she studied hairdressing, and she switched to sales after a year. She then worked as a cashier at a convenience store. Her daughter Patricia was born in 2012, and Dudová separated from her partner after six months. She was noticed by director Petr Václav at a Romani party, who offered her a role since he was looking for actresses for his film The Way Out.

== In media ==
On 1 April 2015, the Czech newspaper Mladá fronta Dnes published an article with the headline "Roma star actor did not pay for apartment" by editor Artur Janoušek on its front page. Due to criticism, the editorial staff of the newspaper subsequently changed the headline to "Award-winning star of the film The Way Out owes rent", but the editor-in-chief, Jaroslav Plesl, defended both the headline and the placement of the article on the front page.

== Filmography ==
=== Films ===
- The Way Out (2014)
- We Are Never Alone (2016)
- Skokan (2017)
- Victim (2022)

=== TV series ===
- Rédl (2018)
- Most! (2019)

== Awards ==
- Best Female Performance in the 2014 IFF Art Film, for The Way Out
- 2015 Czech Lion Awards, for The Way Out
