= Andrea Sedláčková =

Czech film director

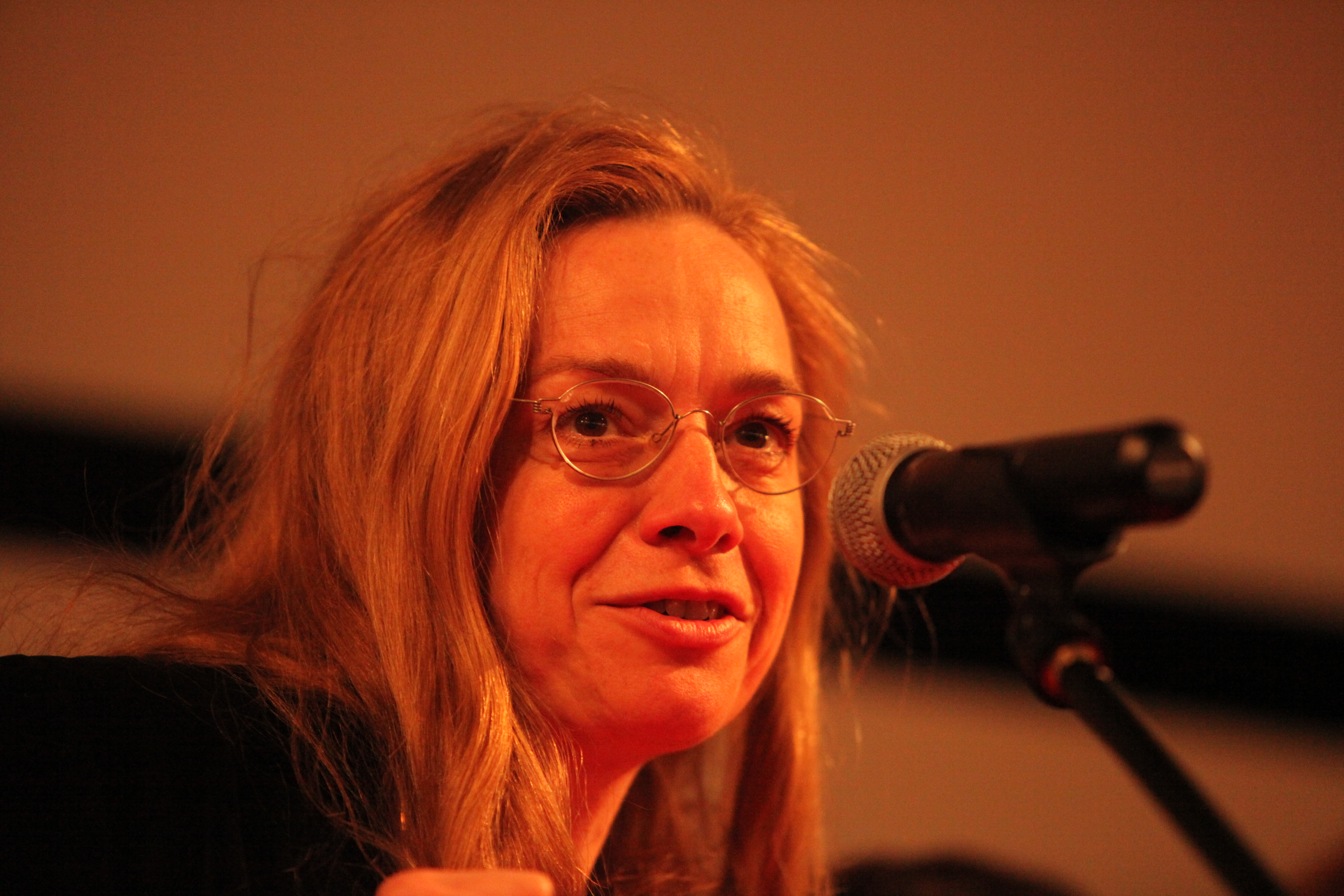
- Born: 22 February 1967 (age 59); Prague, Czechoslovakia
- Occupations: Film director Film editor
- Years active: 1999-present

Andrea Sedláčková (born 22 February 1967) is a Czech film director, editor and screenwriter. Her 2000 film Victims and Murderers was entered into the 23rd Moscow International Film Festival.

== Early life ==
From 1986 to 1989, she studied screenwriting and dramaturgy at the Film and TV School of the Academy of Performing Arts in Prague (FAMU). She participated in the January 1989 demonstrations in Prague. In the summer of 1989, while in London, she saw the televised 21 August 1989 demonstrations. She applied for political asylum in Paris, which she was granted on 17 November 1989 (Velvet Revolution). She studied in the editing department of La Fémis, from which she was graduated in 1994.

== Selected filmography ==
=== Director ===
- Victims and Murderers (2000)
- Seducer (2002)
- Fair Play (2014)
- Backstage (2018)

=== Editor ===
- Our Happy Lives (1999)
- Sachs' Disease (1999)
- Une hirondelle a fait le printemps (2001)
- Almost Peaceful (2002)
- Love Me If You Dare (2004)
- Malabar Princess (2004)
- Joyeux Noël (2005)
- Contre-enquête (2007)
- Welcome (2009)
- Farewell (2009)
- With Love... from the Age of Reason (2010)
- Demi-soeur (2013)
- L'Odeur de la mandarine (2015)
- A Kid (2016)
- Garde alternée (2017)
