= The Way Out (2014 film) =

- Directed by: Petr Václav
- Written by: Petr Václav
- Produced by: Miloš Lochman; Karel Chvojka; Jan Macola
- Starring: Klaudia Dudová; David Ištok; Mária Ferencová-Zajacová; Milan Cifra; Natálie Hlaváčová; Sára Makulová; Přemysl Bureš
- Cinematography: Štěpán Kučera
- Edited by: Florent Mangeot
- Production company: Moloko Film
- Distributed by: Aerofilms (Czech Republic); Paramount Pictures (France)
- Release date: May 29, 2014
- Running time: 103 minutes
- Countries: Czech Republic; France
- Languages: Czech; French

The Way Out (Czech: Cesta ven; French: Je m’en sortirai) is a 2014 Czech-French social drama film directed by Czech director Petr Václav. It premiered at the 2014 Cannes Film Festival. The film won seven Czech Lion awards, including selected Best Czech Film of 2014 and Best Director. According to Variety, The Way Out is a story of a "young gypsy woman trying to lead a 'normal' life [...] in a constant battle against prejudice and her own community's entrenched behavior."
