= Fair Play (2014 film) =

2014 film

- Film poster
- Directed by: Andrea Sedláčková
- Written by: Irena Hejdová; Andrea Sedláčková
- Produced by: Kateřina Černá; Pavel Strnad
- Starring: Anna Geislerová; Judit Bárdos; Roman Luknár
- Cinematography: Jan Baset Střítežský
- Edited by: Jakub Hejna
- Music by: Miro Žbirka; David Solař
- Distributed by: Falcon
- Release date: 6 March 2014
- Running time: 100 minutes
- Countries: Czech Republic; Slovakia
- Language: Czech
- Budget: 36 million Kč

Fair Play is a 2014 Czech drama film directed by Andrea Sedláčková. It was selected as the Czech entry for the Best Foreign Language Film at the 87th Academy Awards, but was not nominated.

== Plot ==
Set in Czechoslovakia in 1983, the film tells the story of Anna, a sprinter who is hoping to compete in the Olympics, and is selected into the national team. She is placed in a special state-run medical treatment where she is given anabolic steroids ("Stromba") by her trainer. Her performance increases but later discovers the negative effect of taking the steroids, causing her to stop using them.

Anna's father escaped Czechoslovakia for the West which takes a toll of her mother's career, as she is unable to find any decent job. Additionally, she is under frequent surveillance of the secret service. She sees her daughter's participation in the Olympic Games as the opportunity for Anna to emigrate, so she secretly continues to give her the injections of steroids. She also has contacts with her former love Marek, a political dissident for whom she types the essays which are considered hostile to the government, causing her more trouble with the secret service agents. Meanwhile, Anna falls in love and is more and more reluctant to emigrate.

== Cast ==
- Vlastina Svátková as Nurse
- Berenika Kohoutová as Anna (voice)
- Anna Geislerová as Irena
- Roman Luknár as Bohdan (trainer)
- Judit Bárdos as Anna
- Eva Josefíková as Marina
- Michaela Pavlátová as Mother of Tomás

== Production ==
The film was shot in Prague, Bratislava, and Vysoké Tatry and in Germany. The scenes in Karl-Marx-Stadt (now Chemnitz) were filmed in today's Chemnitz (Karl Marx Monument) and in Dresden (the Heinz-Steyer-Stadion was used as the film set for the stadium in Karl-Marx-Stadt). Judit Bárdos and Eva Josefíková went through athletic training for six months prior to filming, in order to be able to perform the running scenes realistically. Nonetheless, doubles replaced the main actors in certain scenes.

The title song was recorded by Miro Žbirka in the London Abbey Road Studios.

== Reception ==
Stephen Dalton of The Hollywood Reporter gave Fair Play a positive review, calling it " a gripping tale of grace under pressure".

== Accolades ==
Fair Play was submitted by the Czech Film and Television Academy as an Oscar candidate, but did not get nominated.

The film received four nominations for the Czech Film Critics Award, but won none. It also received the largest number of nominations (15) for the 2014 Czech Lion Awards, but did not win any; however, it did receive the Film Fans Award and the non-statutory award for Best Film Poster.

== See also ==
- List of submissions to the 87th Academy Awards for Best Foreign Language Film
- List of Czech submissions for the Academy Award for Best Foreign Language Film
