= Catherine Turocy =

Catherine Turocy co-founded The New York Baroque Dance Company in 1976, with Ann Jacoby. The NYBDC is dedicated to reconstructing Baroque dances. Catherine Turocy studied historical dance under Ohio State teacher, Shirley Wynne. She has reconstructed and choreographed “over 300 dances and 60 opera-ballets” including numerous Rameau operas, including Les Boréades. She has worked ten years at the Handel Festival in Goettingen, Germany. She has toured the world and made numerous dance videos. As director of the New York Baroque Dance Company, she presents reconstructions of 17th- and 18th-century dances, often in collaboration with Concert Royal, a musical group directed by James Richman that uses period instruments."

HONORS, GRANTS, AWARDS:

2018-2019 Center for Ballet and the Arts Residency Fellowship in NYC (affiliated with NYU) Isadora Duncan Dance Award for Best Re-staging and Reconstruction 2018 (Le Temple de la Gloire, Rameau) Best of the Bay, top prize for Choreography 2017 (Le Temple de la Gloire, Rameau) Best of the Bay, top prize for Opera 2017 (Le Temple de la Gloire, Rameau) Bachtrack (International) Award for Best Opera photo (stage director) 2017 (Le Temple de la Gloire, Rameau) Artist/Lecturer in residence at Dance New Amsterdam 2013 CMRS Visiting Distinguished Scholar (UCLA) 2013 Natalie Skelton Award for Sustained Artistic Excellence, 2008 BESSIE Award for Sustained Achievement in Choreography, 2001 Getty Scholar, 1997 Chevalier in the Order of Arts and Letters, decorated by the French government, 1995

Prix Claude Rostand (French prize given by the critics for the best lyric opera of the year, 1986 Scylla et Glaucus) Chosen as one of the top choreographers in New York City to be documented as part of the National Dance Heritage Project at the Library of the Performing Arts at Lincoln Center since 1980 National Endowment for the Arts Choreography Fellowships: 1980, 1983, 1984, 1986-88, 1990, 1994-6, 1996-97, when this category disappeared from the NEA. NEA Heritage and Preservation Grants 1997-2016 New York Foundation for the Arts Fellowship, 1990 US-France Exchange Fellowship, National Endowment for the Arts, 1987 Jerome Foundation Award for Choreographic Creation, 1985 USA-UK Exchange Fellowship, National Endowment for the Arts, 1980-81 Dance Film Award, for the creation of the video, The Art of Dancing: An Introduction to Baroque Dance, 1979 Ohio State University Scholarship, 1970-74; Women’s Club of Orange Village, 1970-72 Member of Alpha Lambda Delta (Academic Honor Society, 1970-74)

== The New York Baroque Dance Company ==
The New York Baroque Dance Company produces "historically accurate" performances and also "reinterprets Baroque choreography." More than thirty opera productions have been commissioned for the NYBDC around the world. Productions include period costumes and masks. The NYBDC offers classes. The New York Public Library put on an exhibition, The New Baroque: Early Dance Re-creations and Inspirations in 1997 in honor of the NYBDC's 20th anniversary.
