= Chopin Festival =

- Genre: classical music
- Dates: August
- Locations: Duszniki-Zdrój, Poland
- Coordinates: 50.4048233°N 16.3895687°E
- Years active: 1946–present
- Organiser: Fundacja Międzynarodowych Festiwali Chopinowskich
- Website: festival.pl

The International Chopin Festival is an annual classical music festival held in August in Duszniki-Zdrój in Kłodzko Valley, Poland. It is the oldest and principal Chopin Festival, to be distinguished from several other Chopin festivals including the International Music Festival held in Warsaw in September.

== Other Chopin festivals ==
- Antonin, Ostrów County, Poland – "Chopin in fall colors" founded 1982
- Valldemossa – Associacio Festivals Chopin de Valldemossa
- Nohant – Les Rencontres Internationales Frédéric Chopin, extension of the festival of George Sand
- Paris – Chopin concert series
- Mariánské Lázně
- Gaming, Austria
- Vienna
- Warsaw – Chopin and his Europe
- El Paso – El Paso Chopin Piano Festival
- Belgrade, Serbia – Belgrade Chopin Fest
