= Les Boréades =

Opera by Jean-Philippe Rameau

- Opera by Jean-Philippe Rameau
- Title page of the score manuscript
- Librettist: Louis de Cahusac (attrib.)
- Language: French
- Based on: Abaris the Hyperborean
- Premiere: 1982; Aix-en-Provence Festival

Les Boréades is the final opera composed by Jean-Philippe Rameau (1683–1764). The work takes the form of a tragédie lyrique in five acts. The libretto, attributed to Louis de Cahusac (1706–1759), is loosely based on the Greek legend of Abaris the Hyperborean and includes Masonic elements; the Boréades are the descendants of Boréas. Though evidently rehearsed in 1763, the work was yet unperformed by Rameau's death in 1764.

== Background ==
There were no known performances of this opera in Rameau's lifetime. The work was in rehearsal in 1763 at the Paris Opéra, probably for a private performance at the court at Choisy. It is not known why the performance was abandoned, though many theories have been put forward, including that factions at court fought over it, the music was too difficult, there were subversive plot elements, and that the Opéra was burnt down in the month of rehearsals. The first known performance of the work was at Lille in 1770 in a concert performance. J. J. M. Decroix collected Rameau's works after the composer's death, ensuring the score's survival. The Bibliothèque Nationale housed the collected works, including various manuscripts related to this opera.

== Modern performance history ==
Celebrating the 200th anniversary of Rameau's death, the first modern performance of the work was 16 September 1964 by the ORTF at the Maison de la Radio in Paris, recorded for broadcast the following month. The cast included Christiane Eda-Pierre and Andre Mallabrera. It owes its modern revival to conductor John Eliot Gardiner, who gave a concert version of the piece (in which Trevor Pinnock played harpsichord continuo) at the Queen Elizabeth Hall, London, on 14 April 1975, for which he had prepared the orchestral material from the original manuscripts over the preceding year. In July 1982, Gardiner gave the first fully staged performance with Catherine Turocy, choreographer, and her New York Baroque Dance Company at the Aix-en-Provence Festival. Since then, the opera's reputation and popularity have grown. In 2020, Václav Luks led the Czech baroque orchestra Collegium 1704 on a European tour with a concert production of the opera (Vienna, Moscow, Versailles). A complete recording featuring Caroline Weynants, Deborach Cachet, Benedikt Kristjánsson, Mathias Vidal, and Benoît Arnould, was released in the same year by the label Château de Versailles Spectacles. The recording won the French award Trophées for the best opera recording of the year.

== Roles ==
Role	Voice type	Premiere cast (unperformed in Rameau's lifetime)
Alphise	soprano	
Sémire	soprano	
Borilée	baritone	
Calisis	haute-contre	
Abaris	haute-contre	
Adamas	baritone	
A nymph	soprano	
L'Amour (Cupid)	soprano	
Polymnie (Polyhymnia)	soprano	
Boréas	bass	
Apollon	baritone	
Pleasures, Graces, Apollo's priests, Bactrian people, Seasons, Zephyrs, Subterranean Winds (chorus)

== Synopsis ==
Alphise, Queen of Bactria, is in love with Abaris, whose origins are unknown. According to the traditions of her country, Alphise must marry a Boread, one of the descendants of Boreas, the god of the north wind. Determined to marry Abaris, Alphise abdicates, angering Boreas who storms into the wedding and abducts Alphise to his kingdom. With the help of Apollo and the muse Polyhymnia, Abaris sets off to rescue her. He challenges Boreas and his sons with a magic golden arrow. Apollo descends as deus ex machina and reveals that Abaris is really his son by a Boread nymph. Therefore, there is no longer any obstacle to Abaris and Alphise's marriage.

== Recordings ==
The opera has no entry in Francis Clough and G. J. Cuming's World's Encyclopedia of Recorded Music, which documents most significant classical recordings of the electrical 78 RPM era, but the first recording of an excerpt is likely to have been one of the relatively few such disks omitted from that publication: pianist Marie Novello's performance of "Gavottes pour les Heures from Act IV", recorded on March 1, 1927 and issued as one side of a His Master's Voice 10" 78 RPM record no. B 2592, labeled simply "Gavotte."

Complete recordings from the modern era include:

- Erato (1982 recording): Monteverdi Orchestra and Choir; John Eliot Gardiner, conductor.
- Opus Arte DVD (2004 recording); Les Arts Florissants/Opéra National de Paris, William Christie, conductor.
- Château de Versailles Spectacles (2020 recording), Collegium 1704, Václav Luks, conductor.
- Le Concert d'Astrée, Emmanuelle Haïm (DVD 2021)
