= Giovanni Henrico Albicastro =

- Born: c. 1660; Pappenheim
- Died: January 26, 1730; Maastricht
- Other name: Enrico Albicastro

Johann Heinrich von Weissenburg (c. 1660 – 26 January 1730), known as Giovanni Henrico Albicastro, was an amateur musician and composer of the Baroque era.

== Biography ==
Albicastro came from Klosterneuburg near Vienna, or the village of Bieswangen, near Pappenheim in central Bavaria, not far from the village of Weissenburg ("White Castle", thus "Albicastro" in Latin or Italian). Johann Gottfried Walther included Albicastro in his Musicalisches Lexicon (1732) under the mistaken supposition that Albicastro came from Switzerland; consequently he has often been included in lists of Swiss musicians.

In 1686, Albicastro moved to Leiden, in the Netherlands, where he registered at the University of Leiden as a Musicus Academiae, but his name does not appear in the university's archives.

In 1696, a collection of twelve of his trio sonatas appeared, entitled Il giardino armonico sacro-profano ("The sacred-profane harmonic garden"), Op. 3. Edited by François Barbry, it was published in Bruges by François van Heurck; no copies of the last six, or of Albicastro's opus 1 or opus 2 from Bruges seem to have survived. In Amsterdam a separate set of opus numbers were published by Estienne Roger: collections of violin sonatas (Opp. 2, 3, 5, 6 and 9), trio sonatas (Opp. 1, 4 and 8), and string concertos (Op. 7) in a Corellian idiom.

During the last phases of the War of the Spanish Succession (1701–1713), he served as a captain of cavalry. He remained active in this position until 1730, when he died in Maastricht. One source mentions that he may have died in 1738, but this is erroneous.
