= Emőke Baráth =

Hungarian soprano (born 1985)

Emőke Baráth (born November 21, 1985) is a Hungarian soprano. She began her musical studies in Gödöllő, majoring in piano and cello, and then continued harp and vocal studies at the King St. Stephen's Secondary School of Music in Budapest.

She began her singing studies under the direction of József Hormai. Her teacher at the Liszt Ferenc University of Music (2007-2012) was Júlia Pászthy, and in the 2011/2012 academic year she also graduated from the Florence Conservatory, where she was a student of Leonardo de Lisi. She participated in the master classes of Barbara Bonney, Kiri Te Kanawa, Éva Marton, Klára Kolonits, Nancy Argenta, Masaaki Suzuki, Alfred Brendel, Ferenc Rados, Sylvia Sass, Deborah York, Nicholas Clapton and Andrea Meláth.

Already at the beginning of her career, Baráth gained many national and international recognitions. Among other things, she won third place at the Antonín Dvořák International Singing Competition in Karlovy Vary. In 2011, she won First Prize at the Second International Singing Competition for Baroque Opera in Innsbruck, as well as the Grand Prix of the Verbier Festival. In addition, Baráth's work was recognized with the Hungarian Junior Prima Award in 2011.

Baráth is particularly known for the title roles of Cavalli operas, Elena with Leonardo García Alarcón 2013, and Hipermestra at the Glyndebourne Festival for William Christie in 2017. In May 2018, she was signed to an exclusive recording contract with Erato. She is represented professionally by the French company Concerts Parisiens.
