= Simona Houda-Šaturová =

Slovak classical soprano

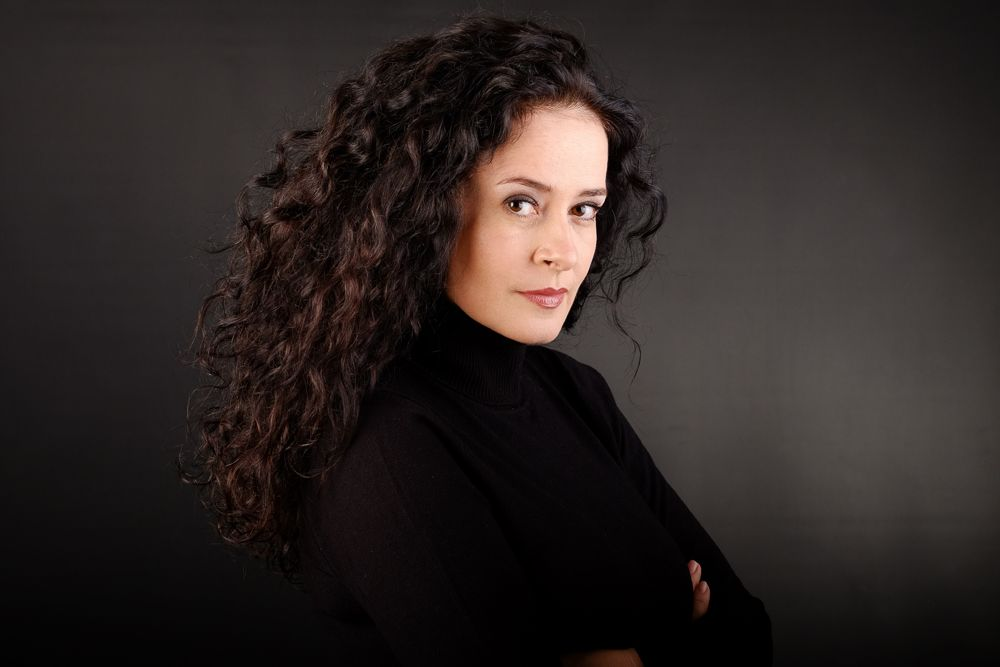
Simona Šaturová

Simona Houda-Šaturová is a Slovak classical soprano who has had an active international career performing in operas, concerts, and recitals since the early 1990s. In 2001, she received a Thalia Award and in 2007 she won the Charlotte and Walter Hamel Award for outstanding vocal achievement. She has worked at many opera houses and concert stages, singing under such conductors as Rolf Beck, Jiří Bělohlávek, Sylvain Cambreling, Rafael Frühbeck de Burgos, Christoph Eschenbach, John Fiore, Ádám Fischer, Christopher Hogwood, Manfred Honeck, Sir Neville Marriner, Tomáš Netopil, and Helmuth Rilling among others.

== Biography ==
Šaturová was born in Bratislava; she took her first violin lesson at the age of five and went on to study at the Bratislava Conservatory. She also attended master classes led by Ileana Cotrubas in Vienna and Margreet Honig in Amsterdam.

She began her career as a member of the Prague Chamber Opera from 1991–1995. She was a member of the Prague State Opera (PSO) from 1994 to 1998 where she portrayed such roles as Adele Die Fledermaus, Angelica in Orlando furioso, Frasquita in Carmen, Leni in Gottfried von Einem's The Trial, Oscar in Un ballo in maschera, and Papagena in Die Zauberflöte. She has since returned to the PSO as a guest artist as the title heroine in Lucia di Lammermoor (2004, 2008, and 2009), Rosina in Il barbiere di Siviglia (2005), Gilda in Rigoletto (2008–2009), Rosina (2009). She appeared as a guest in a gala concert with Welsh bass-baritone Bryn Terfel in 2009.

Since 1999, Houda-Šaturová has worked as a freelance artist with opera companies around the world. She has made appearances at Carnegie Hall, the Herkules-Saal in Munich, the Konzerthaus, Vienna, the Salle Pleyel in Paris, the Megaron Mousikis in Athens, the Opéra de Monte Carlo, the Salzburg Festival, the Teatro Colón, the Théâtre du Châtelet, and the Tonhalle Zürich. She also was invited to perform at the Sistine Chapel for Pope Benedict XVI in a concert broadcast internationally. She made her debut at the Opern- und Schauspielhaus Frankfurt as Pamina in Die Zauberflöte in 2007. She later returned to that house as Madama Cortese in Il Viaggio a Reims (2008), Oscar (2008), and Lucia (2010). She appeared as Sandrina in La finta giardiniera (2008) at the Estates Theatre in Prague and Gilda at the Brno National Theatre (2008). She appeared as Ilia in Mozart's Idomeneo at La Monnaie in 2010.

In 2006, Houda-Šaturová was the soloist in Gustav Mahler's Symphony No. 2 under conductor Christoph Eschenbach for the reopening of the Salle Pleyel in Paris. She had later recorded that work with Eschenbach and the Philadelphia Orchestra on the Ondine label. Her recordings include a disc of sacred music by Wolfgang Amadeus Mozart on the Arco Diva label, Camille Saint-Saëns's Oratorio de Noël on the Sony BMG label, Joseph Haydn's Harmonie-Messe and Theresienmesse on the Hänssler Classics label, and a disc of Haydn opera arias on the ORFEO label. In 2013, she released Gloria on the ArteSmon label.

She has also appeared as a guest performer with orchestras in Tel Aviv, Tokyo, Detroit, and Toronto, and at the Oregon Bach Festival in Eugene and the Schleswig-Holstein Music Festival. In 2022 she debuted with the Vienna Philharmonic.
