= Petr Václav =

Czech film director and screenwriter (born 1967)

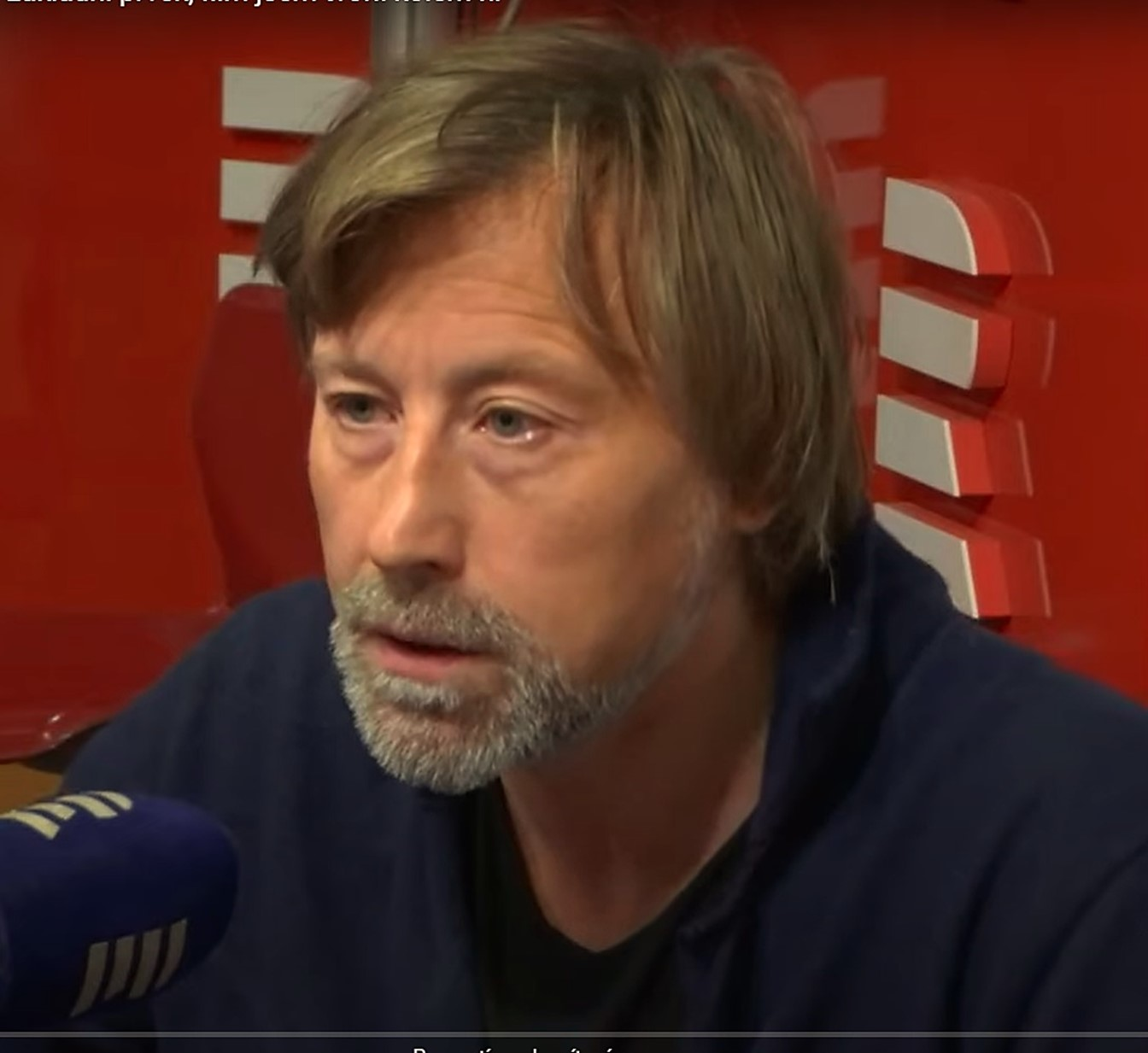

Background information
- Born: 11 June 1967 (age 58); Prague, Czechoslovakia
- Occupations: film director and screenwriter
- Years active: 1993–present

Petr Václav (born 11 June 1967) is a Czech film director and screenwriter whose films have received many awards, both in the Czech Republic and internationally. He has lived in Paris since 2003 and holds both French and Czech citizenship.

== Life and works ==
Václav was born in Prague in a family of music composer Jiří Václav (1940-2020) and film conductor Ljuba Václavová. He graduated from FAMU. His short documentary Paní Le Murie (Madame Le Murie) of 1993 was nominated for FAMU's Student Academy Award and won a prize for best documentary at the Internationales Festival der Filmhochschulen (Filmschoolfest) in Munich. Václav´s first feature film, Marian (1996) won the Silver Leopard and FIPRESCI Award at the Locarno International Film Festival and other prizes at film festivals in Angers, Thessaloniki, Belfort, Cottbus, Bratislava and Tehran. His second feature, Paralelní světy (Parallel Worlds) of 2001 was written in collaboration with the French screenwriter Marie Desplechin and selected for presentation at the San Sebastián International Film Festival.

The film The Way Out, released in France as Zaneta, premiered at the 2014 Cannes Film Festival. It won seven Czech Lion awards for the year 2014, including best film, best director, and best screenplay.

Václav's film We Are Never Alone opened at the 2016 Berlin International Film Festival (Berlinale) in the Forum category and won the Tagesspiel Readers' Jury Award. He is finishing a new French-Italian co-production, Skokan, which is now in post-production.

His documentary Zpověď zapomenutého (Confession of the Vanished), which portrays the life of the Czech-Italian composer Josef Mysliveček, was shown at the FIPA International Competition in Biarritz in 2016 and won the gold prize in its category (the FIPA d'or). It is also the winner of the 2016 Trilobit Award.

A biographical film based on the life of composer Josef Mysliveček with the title Il Boemo was opened at the San Sebastián International Film Festival on 20 September 2022. It originated in a Czech-Italian-Slovak coproduction, music in a collaboration with the Czech conductor Václav Luks, artistic director of the early music ensemble Collegium 1704 and his soloists,

Václav is a member of the European Film Academy of Berlin and the Czech Film and Television Academy. He was a pensioner of the French Academy in Rome at the Villa Medici in 2010–11.
