= Hana Blažíková =

Czech soprano and harpist

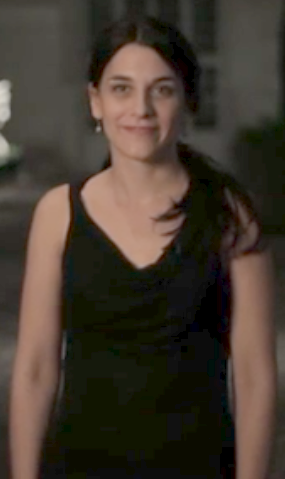
- In a Chopin Institute video in 2012
- Born: 2 December 1980 (age 45); Prague, Czechoslovakia
- Education: Charles University; Prague Conservatory
- Occupations: Classical soprano; Harpist
- Organizations: Bach Collegium Japan; Collegium Vocale Gent; Tiburtina

Hana Blažíková (born 2 December 1980) is a Czech soprano and harpist. She is focused on Medieval, Renaissance and Baroque music, appearing internationally. She has recorded as a member of the Bach Collegium Japan, among many others.

== Career ==
Born in Prague, Blažíková earned a degree in musicology and philosophy at the Charles University. In 2002, she received a diploma in vocal performance from the Prague Conservatory where she studied voice with Jiří Kotouč. She took masterclasses with Poppy Holden, Peter Kooy, Monika Mauch and Howard Crook. On the opera stage, she appeared as Susanna in Mozart's Le Nozze di Figaro at the Karlovy Vary theatre, and as Zerlina in his Don Giovanni at the Estates Theatre in Prague. She has specialized in early music of the Medieval, Renaissance and Baroque periods.

Blažíková is a member of the Bach Collegium Japan, conducted by Masaaki Suzuki. She has recorded as a member of the choir and as a soloist in the project to record the complete cantatas by Johann Sebastian Bach. She appeared on volumes 43, 46 and 47 in 2009. Volume 53, containing In allen meinen Taten, BWV 97, Ich ruf zu dir, Herr Jesu Christ, BWV 177 and Es ist das Heil uns kommen her, BWV 9, was reviewed in 2013, noting that in a duet of BWV 97, "the fresh and bright sounding soprano" contrasted with Peter Kooy's bass. They performed in 2011 in New York's Carnegie Hall. She has worked with the Collegium Vocale Gent, conducted by Philippe Herreweghe, touring in both 2010 and 2013 with Bach's St Matthew Passion. She has collaborated with ensembles such as Amsterdam Baroque Orchestra & Choir conducted by Ton Koopman, the vocal ensemble Sette Voci conducted by Kooy, Gli Angeli Genève conducted by Stephan MacLeod, Musica Florea conducted by Marek Štryncl, Capella Regia Prague conducted by Robert Hugo, La Fenice conducted by Jean Tubéry and the J. S. Bach-Stiftung conducted by Rudolf Lutz. She has appeared at festivals such as the Prague Spring, Oude Muziek Utrecht and the Salzburg Festival. In 2011 she performed the soprano part of Bach's St John Passion with the Boston Symphony Orchestra. In 2014 she participated as Sirena in a staged version of Orfeo Chaman by Christina Pluhar with the ensemble L'Arpeggiata in at the Teatro Mayor of Bogotà.

In addition to her work as a soprano, Blažíková is a professional harpist, performing medieval vocal music and often accompanying herself. From 2008, she has been a member of the all-female Tiburtina ensemble, which specializes in Gregorian Chant and Medieval part-music.

== Recordings ==
In 2005 Blažíková recorded Jan Dismas Zelenka's sacred cantata Il Serpente di Bronzo with the Ensemble Inégal, led by Adam Viktora. In 2008 Lift Thine Eyes, Piarists Music in Baroque Bohemia. Capella Regia Musicalis, Robert Hugo, 2008 In 2009 she recorded Buxtehude's Membra Jesu Nostri and Bach's Motets with Peter Kooy. She appeared in Rorate Coeli, sacred music for Advent and Christmas from the 18th century by Václav Karel Holan Rovenský, Antonín Reichenauer, Zelenka, J. F. Fasch and Antonio Caldara with the Collegium Marianum Prague conducted by Jana Semerádová. As part of the series Music from Eighteenth-Century Prague, she performed with the same ensemble Concertos & Arias by Jan Josef Ignác Brentner. In 2010 she recorded duets with Kooy, titled Harmoniae Sacrae: works of Franz Tunder, Johann Valentin Meder, Matthias Weckmann, Heinrich Ignaz Franz Biber, Christoph Bernhard and Benedictus Buns, accompanied by the ensemble L'Armonia Sonora, conducted by Mieneke van der Velden.

Her first solo album was in 2013 devoted to German Baroque Cantatas by Johann Schop, Johann Philipp Förtsch, Johann Pachelbel, Johann Philipp Krieger, Biber, Samuel Capricornus, Samuel Ebart and Dieterich Buxtehude with the ensemble CordArte. She recorded Bach's Mass in B minor with Herreweghe, with the Collegium 1704, conducted by Václav Luks and with the Netherlands Bach Society conducted by Jos van Veldhoven. In 2013 she recorded music from Vienna composed in 1709, a collection of rarely performed arias from operas by Pietro Baldassare, Attilio Ariosti, Giovanni Battista Bononcini and Johann Joseph Fux. A reviewer who called her an "increasingly valued performer of older music" noted her precision and focus. Together with Dominik Wörner she recorded Bach's Dialog-cantatas BWV 32, BWV 57, BWV 58, accompanied by the ensemble Kirchheimer BachConsort.

- Bach, J.S. - Magnificat BWV 243
