= Michael Pospíšil =

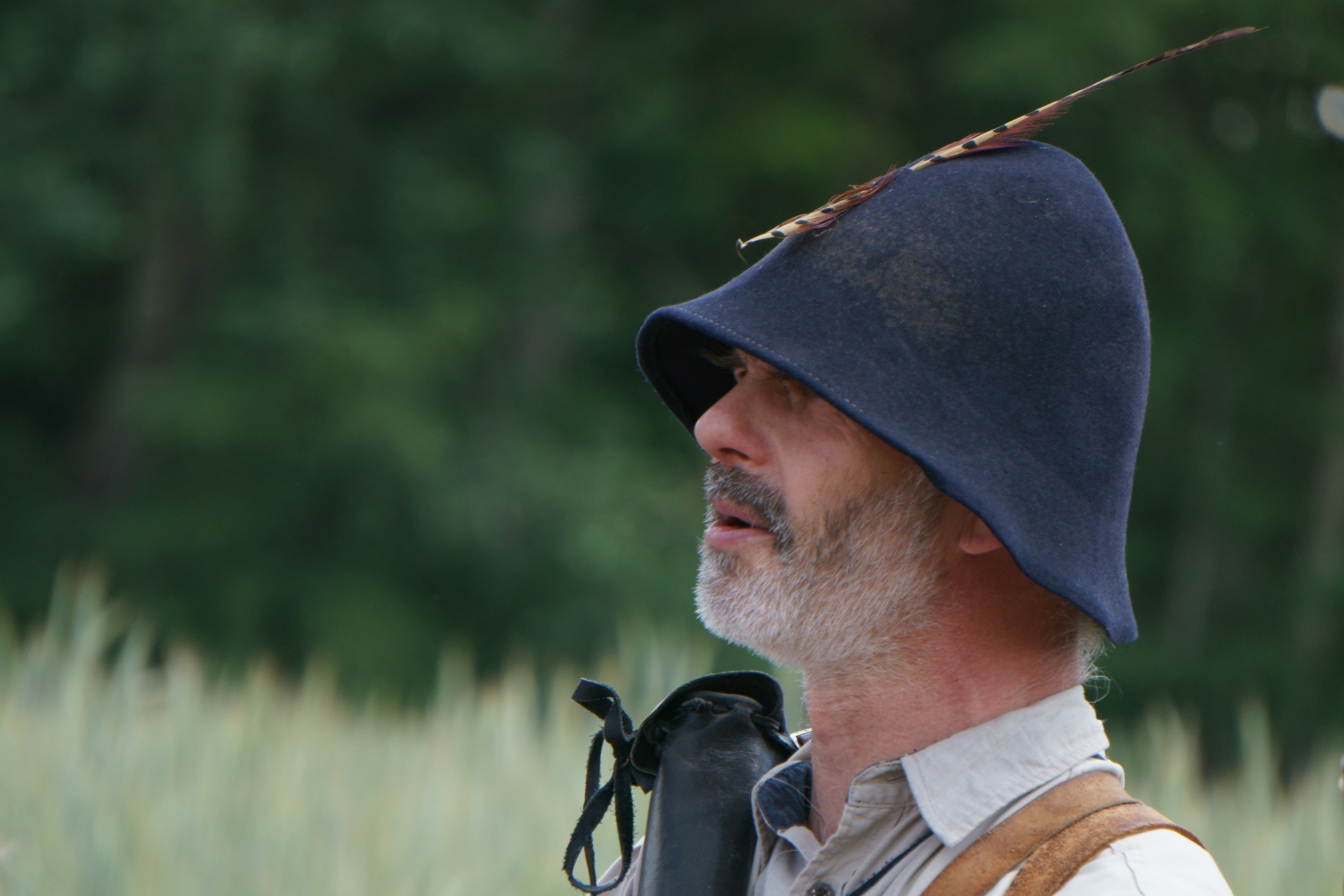
- Michael Pospíšil in 2018
- Born: 1962 (age 63–64); Czechoslovakia
- Education: Prague Conservatory
- Occupation: Bass
- Organization: Ritornello

Michael Pospíšil (born 1962) is a classical bass, specialising in historically informed performance. He is the founder and leader of the ensemble Ritornello which performs music of the 16th and 17th centuries for voices and a great variety of instruments.

Pospíšil studied voice at the Prague Conservatory from 1981 to 1986. He took master classes with Marius van Altena and Stephen Stubbs, among others. He has collaborated internationally with ensembles such as Musica Antiqua Praha, Capella Regia Musicalis, Bornus Consort and the Tölzer Knabenchor. In 1993, he founded the ensemble Ritornello. The chamber group concentrates on music of the 16th and 17th centuries. A core group consists of three musicians who sing and are able to play several instruments. They perform music which they study scholarly from manuscripts and early publications. Their instruments are historic or faithful reproductions, including lute, theorbo, Baroque guitar and violins, hurdy-gurdy, Renaissance bagpipes and trombones, organ, dulcian, flutes, viola da braccio and viola da gamba. The ensemble performs sacred music as well as traditional songs and music for dance and banquet. They recorded for example music from Capella Regia Musicalis, a hymnal by Václav Karel Holan Rovenský in 1693–94 "as an instrument of the Counter-Reformation", including not only hymns, but small cantatas, dramatic scenes, even music of the Protestant Moravian Brethren, mostly in Czech. It has been described as "one of the jewels of Czech musical history".

In 1998, Pospíšil recorded Jakub Jan Ryba's Česká mše vánoční (Czech Christmas Mass) with Gabriela Eibenová, Magdalena Kožená, Jaroslav Březina, the Calmus Ensemble and the Capella Regia Musicalis. In 2004, he sang the bass part in Bach's Christmas Oratorio in St. Martin, Idstein, with Katia Plaschka, Franz Vitzthum and the orchestra Antichi Strumenti.

== Selected discography ==
- Upside Down! or Ba©chanalistica (Bohemian Baroque Carmina Burana) (ARTA F1 0145)
- Felix Kadlinský – The Nightingale-in-despite (Zdoro-slavíček) (1634/1665) – the Czech translation of the collection of sacred songs Trutznachtigall by Fridrich Spee von Langenfeld, translated by Kadlinský in 1655 (ARTA F1 0140)
- Karel Václav Holan Rovenský (1694) – Ritornello and Capella Regia Musicalis (ARTA F1 0124)
- Adam Václav Michna z Otradovic – Christmass Mass (1654), Václav Karel Holan Rovenský, Alberik Mazak, Friedrich Bridel, Vendelin Hueber (Restoration of an Early Baroque Christmass Divine Service) (ARTA F1 0120)
- A-Birding We Will Go! (Hunting Songs of Baroque Bohemia) (ARTA F1 0108)
- Old Czech Carols "The Nativity" (Czech Christmas Dances from Baroque Hymnals) (ARTA F1 0103)
- The Carnival Has Arrived / Masopust juž nastal (Czech Carnival Folk Song Collection From About 1680) (ARTA F1 0085)
- Adam Václav Michna z Otradovic – The Czech Lute (ARTA F1 0104)
