= Gabriela Eibenová =

Czech soprano

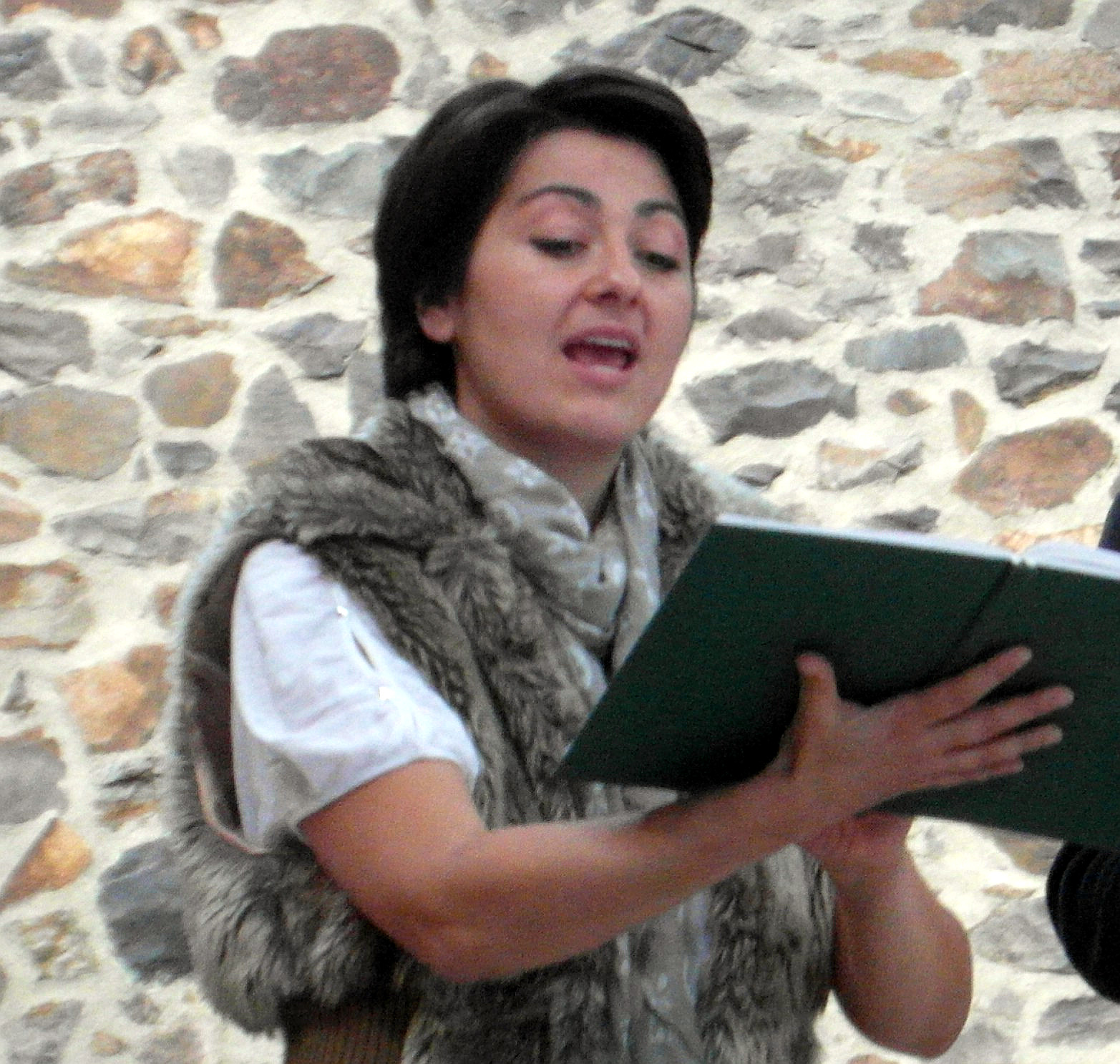
- In rehearsal for Bach's Mass in B minor in St. Martin, Idstein
- Born: 1972; Prague, Czechoslovakia
- Education: Prague Conservatory; Wellington College; Royal Academy of Music
- Occupation: Soprano
- Organization: Capella Regia

Gabriela Eibenová (born 1972) is a Czech soprano in opera and concert, specialising in music of the Baroque and classical period in historically informed performance.

Born in Prague, she studied there at the Prague Conservatory and then on a scholarship at a summer academy of the Wellington College, and with Julie Kennard at the Royal Academy of Music. In 1995, she sang the part of the sorceress in Purcell's Dido and Aeneas at the Purcell Festival in Cologne.

She recorded in 1998 Jakub Jan Ryba's Česká mše vánoční (Czech Christmas Mass) with Magdalena Kožená, Jaroslav Březina and Michael Pospíšil, the Calmus Ensemble and the Capella Regia Musicalis. In 1999, she sang in Rossini's Petite messe solennelle with the Cologne-based Collegium Cantorum Köln, recorded live. In 2013, she flew in from Prague to fill in for a local soprano who had to cancel for health reasons. She sang the soprano part of Bach's Mass in B minor in St. Martin, Idstein on 29 September 2013, with the orchestra L'arpa festante, David Erler, Georg Poplutz and Andreas Pruys.

Eibenová is a participant in Matteo Messori's project Heinrich Schütz Edition, a recording of the complete works by Heinrich Schütz with the Cappella Augustana. With the Ensemble Inégal, she has recorded works by Jan Dismas Zelenka, in 2011 his Missa Omnium Sanctorum, with Kai Wessell, Jan Kobow, and basses Marián Krejčík and Tomáš Král. A 2012 recording of his Missa Sanctissimae Trinitatis and Gaude laetare with the Ensemble Inégal and the Prague Baroque Soloists, conducted by Adam Viktora, with soloists Carlos Mena, Makoto Sakurada and Lisandro Abadie, was critically acclaimed. In 2014, a premiere recording of his Missa Paschalis, ZWV 7, and Litaniae omnium Sactorum was performed with the same ensembles and soloists Terry Wey, Cyril Auvity and Marián Krejčík.

She has also collaborated with the ensembles such as Prague Philharmonia, Südwestfunk Orchester Freiburg, Prague Madrigalists, Musica Florea, Collegium Marianum, Collegium 1704, Arte Dei Suonatori and Orquesta Barroca de Sevigla.

The organist and conductor Adam Viktora is her husband.
