= Marika Pečená =

Marika Pečená is a Czech choirmaster and organizer of musical life focused on early music.

Born in Prague, combined university studies in medicine with musicology. She started conducting in mid nineties. In 1996–98 she acted as assistant choirmaster in Bach-Collegium Praha under Vladimír Novák. In 1999 she formed ensemble Collegium 419 with which she performed early music including revival-premieres from period manuscripts. She was engaged in Collegium 419 until September 2007.

She is member of the Board of the Czech Sacred Music Society. She co-ordinated under auspices of Czech Sacred Music Society first two cycles of the International Summer school of Sacred Music Convivium (2004–2005) in Premonstratensian monastery Želiv. She also participated in production of 2009 and 2011 year-classes.

Marika Pečená privately studied piano with Marie Magdalena Horňanová and choral conducting with Čestmír Stašek and Marek Štryncl. With Collegium 419 she conducted among others the cycle of cantatas Membra Jesu Nostri by Dietrich Buxtehude, Israelis Brünnlein by Johann Hermann Schein, Historia der Auferstehung by Heinrich Schütz etc. In September 2005, she realized with Collegium 419 the revival-premiere of the Responsories by Jakub Jan Ryba (Czech late-18th century composer) at the St. Wenceslas Festivities International Festival of Sacred Arts.

In March 2010 she realized with the new ensemble Sursum Corda Musikalische Exequien by Heinrich Schütz at the Sacred Music Cycle Lenten Fridays in Prague (organised by Collegium Marianum). Since 2010 she co-operates with Premonstratensian monastery Želiv as an Artistic Director of the newly founded festival Zeliv Culture Summer - Musica Figurata.

Marika Pečená graduated at Charles University in Prague - 2nd Faculty of Medicine and is employed as a drug development professional in pharmaceutical industry.
