= Collegium Marianum =

Czech Baroque orchestra

Collegium Marianum is a Prague-based Czech early music orchestra founded in 1997 by the flautist Jana Semerádová. She graduated from the Prague Conservatory and the Philosophical faculty of Charles University, where she studied theory and performance practice of early music. She completed her studies at the Royal Conservatory of The Hague in the class of Wilbert Hazelzet. In the years 2008-2011, she taught the baroque transverse flute and leads master classes. Semerádová is also programme director of the concert cycle Baroque Soirées and the annual Letní slavnosti staré hudby (Summer Festivities of Early Music).

== Discography ==
- Henrico Albicastro: Concerti a quattro op.7 Nr.1-12, with Collegium 1704, Luks 2 CDs 2000 Pan Classics
- Music of Baroque Prague I - with Constanze Backes, and Marián Krejčík baritone 2003
- Music of Baroque Prague II - with Hana Blažíková 2005
- Gloria, sacred arias Simona Houda-Šaturová. Ars.
- Jan Dismas Zelenka: Sepolcri. Hana Blažíková, David Erler, Tobias Hunger, Tomas Kral, Collegium Marianum, Jana Semeradova
- František Jiránek: Sinfonias. Supraphon
- Rorate Coeli, works of V. K. H. Rovenský, A. Reichenauer, J. D. Zelenka, J. F. Fasch, A. Caldara. Hana Blažíková Collegium Marianum, dir. Jana Semerádová, 2009
- Jan Josef Ignác Brentner: Concertos & Arias Hana Blažíková Collegium Marianum, Jana Semerádová, 2009
- A. Caldara: Maddalena ai piedi di Cristo Hana Blažíková as Maddalena DVD Collegium Marianum
- Musici da Camera - Music form 18th Century Prague, Vivaldi etc. 2 CDs Supraphon 2012
