= Marktkirche =

Marktkirche ("Market Church", i. e. church on the market square) is the name of numerous churches in Germany:

- Marktkirche, Hanover
- Marktkirche, Wiesbaden
- Marktkirche Unser Lieben Frauen, Halle, Saxony-Anhalt
