= Collegium 419 =

Collegium 419 is a vocal ensemble specializing in music of the 16th to 18th century, aiming at historical performance praxis of high Renaissance as well as early and high Baroque vocal music with or without instrumental accompaniment.

There are still relatively few ensembles with similar specialization in the Czech Republic. Collegium 419 therefore aims for studying and staging ensemble and choral works, which are well-known and often shown in Europe but which still remain undiscovered or rare in Bohemia.

The ensemble puts high demands on the vocal culture of its own members; most singers study privately solo singing and have wide experience with ensemble or solo singing. Shared interest in old music and refined aesthetical taste are the main motivations for their collaboration in Collegium 419.

When interpreting works with orchestral accompaniment, Collegium 419 works with outstanding instrumental ensembles that follow historical performance praxis of early music, e.g. Hipocondria Ensemble, La Gambetta, Ritornello and others.

The ensemble was founded by Marika Pečená in 1999 with the main aim of discovering German Baroque Protestant music (Schein, Schutz, Buxtehude, Bach…).
In 2004, Čeněk Svoboda started working with the ensemble and broadened the range of the repertoire with music of European high Renaissance (Victoria, Palestrina, Tallis, Lassus, Gallus…) and Italian Baroque music (Monteverdi, Lotti, Caldara, Astorga…). In autumn 2007 he took the role of artistic leader of the whole ensemble.

Collegium 419 pays special attention to preparation of coherent dramaturgy, takes into consideration liturgical and thematic affinity of its programmes and tries to perform according to period praxis.

The most successful projects of Collegium 419 in the past few years were, in particular:
2003: Dietrich Buxtehude - Membra Jesu nostri
2004: Heinrich Schütz - Musikalische Exequien
2005: Tomás Luis de Victoria - Officium defunctorum
2006: Johann Sebastian Bach - Motets
2007: Dolorosi martir (Musical Inspiration in Rudolphine Prague)
2007: Richte uns, Gott! (Felix Mendelssohn-Bartholdy - Psalms and Te Deum)
