= Vytlačil =

Vytlačil (feminine Vytlačilová) is a Czech surname. Notable people with the surname include:

- Lukáš M. Vytlačil (born 1985), Czech historian, flutist and musicologist
- Rudolf Vytlačil (1912–1977), Czech football player and manager
- Vaclav Vytlacil (1892–1984), American artist
