= Adam Michna z Otradovic =

Czech poet, composer and organist (c. 1600 – 1676)

- Also known as: Adamus Michna de Otradowicz
- Born: c. 1600
- Origin: Jindřichův Hradec, Bohemia, Czech Republic
- Died: 2 November 1676
- Genres: Baroque
- Occupations: Composer, instrumentalist, chorus master, poet, songwriter
- Instrument: Organ

Adam Michna z Otradovic, or also Adam Václav Michna z Otradovic – literally Adam Michna of Otradovice (c. 1600 – 2 November 1676, Jindřichův Hradec), was a Czech Catholic poet, composer, hymn writer, organist and choir leader of the early Baroque era. He is also known in simplified form as Adam Michna and during his life as Adamus Wenceslaus Michna de Ottradowicz. He was the most important Czech composer and poet of the early Baroque who initiated the development of Czech art in that era and became a significant inspiration for Czech artists of future generations.

== Life ==
Michna was descended from the noble and musical family of Michna z Otradovic in Jindřichův Hradec in South Bohemia, bearing the title of Knight. His father was the organist and trumpeter Michael Michna (many of his other relatives were also trumpeters). In the 1620s the literary fraternity in the town was restored by the highest Lord Chancellor of the Kingdom of Bohemia Vilém Slavata and that act, together with the activities of the Jesuit College, founded in 1594, contributed greatly to the development of cultural life in the town. Adam Michna became the first student at the Jesuit College, where he studied in 1611–1612 and 1615–1617 at the gymnasium. In the 17th and 18th centuries the Order of Jesuits was a great influence on musical life in the Czech lands. Many of Michna's compositions were later printed and published by Prague Jesuits.

Little is known about his later life. He became a member of the Literary Society and the organist and choir director in 1633 at the provost church in Jindřichův Hradec. He helped to improve the musical life in the town, was a respected and wealthy citizen of Jindřichův Hradec and also the owner of the tap-room. He was twice married, but no record exists of any children. In 1673 he established a foundation for the education of needy young musicians. He died on 2 November 1676.

== Work ==
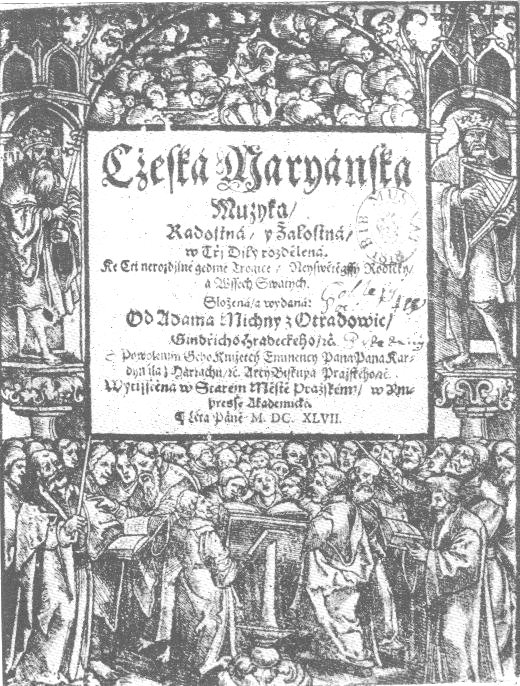
Title page of Česká mariánská muzika by Adam Václav Michna z Otradovic (1647)

Adam Michna was prolific, but not all of his works were preserved and known today. There are 230 of his compositions from three Czech and two Latin collections. The majority of his creative effort was dedicated to sacred music. The best known are his three hymn cycles, Česká mariánská muzika (Czech Marian music), Loutna česká (Czech Lute) and Svatoroční muzika (Holy year music).

He composed vocal as well as vocal-instrumental music to his own lyrics. He wrote many Czech sacred songs; some are still well known and popular, such as the carol Vánoční noc (Christmas Night), better known as Chtíc, aby spal, which is commonly sung today at Christmas in the Czech Republic. It is possible that Michna was familiar with early Italian Baroque compositional techniques.

=== Music ===
==== Sacred music ====
Michna's sacred music (on liturgical texts, in Latin), is melodically rich, with polyphonic sound, in particular using brass instruments (trumpets, trombones), strings and organ. Vocal parts are based on the timbre contrast between solo vocals and choir.

- Obsequium Marianum (1642)
- Officium vespertinum, Psalmi (1648)
- Magnificat I. toni (1654)
- Sacra et litaniae – containing five masses, two litanies, a Te Deum, and a Requiem
- Missa Sancti Wenceslai

==== Songs and hymns ====
Michna musically arranged homophonic songs from his own texts:

- Česká mariánská muzyka (1647)
- Loutna česká (1653)
- Svatoroční muzyka (1661)

=== Poetry ===
Michna's poetry is based on emphasizing the use of word sounds, rhymes and rich metaphorical phrases. His verbal pictures are very vivid and aim to influence the senses. His favourite themes can be described as the inner fight between good and evil in man, moving from lovely images of paradise to the terrible torments of hell, but with specific noble, philosophical insight (however, he sometimes used colloquial language too), enriched on occasion by modest humour, arising from a critical view of human society. Among his other main themes is the imaginative depiction of nature. He was the first Czech poet to create the phenomenon of spiritual-romantic poetry.

The list of poems is practically identical to the collections of songs.

== Recordings ==
- Sacra Et Litaniae à 5, 6, 7 & 8 Vocum Cum Instrumentis – Václav Smetáček, Josef Veselka, Symphonisches Orchester Des Rundfunks von Bratislava, Moravan, Schwann, 1966
- Missa à 7, Cantiones, Requiem – Capella Regia Musicalis, Robert Hugo; Studio Matouš, 1992
- Missa Sancti Wenceslai, Svatoroční Muzika – Capella Regia Musicalis, Robert Hugo; Popron Music, 1994
- Officium Vespertinum Capella Regia Musicalis, Robert Hugo; Arta Records, 2001
- The Czech Lute (Loutna česká) – Prague Chamber Choir, Musica Bohemica, Jaroslav Krček; Supraphon, 2002. Musica Pro Sancta Cecilia, 2008
- Messe de Saint-Wenceslas & Requiem – Chorale Franco-Allemande de Paris, Direction Bernard Lallement: Wild Palms Music, 2006. Also released in 1992 by Harmonia Mundi and BNL Productions

== Notes ==
- Essential part of his scores, published by Editio Bärenreiter in Prague (former Editio Supraphon)
- Compendium of 172 poems: Otradovic, Adam Michna z (2002). Nebeští kavalérové [Heavenly Cavalry] (in Czech). Prague: BB Art. ISBN 80-7257-923-1.
