= Nickel Hoffmann =

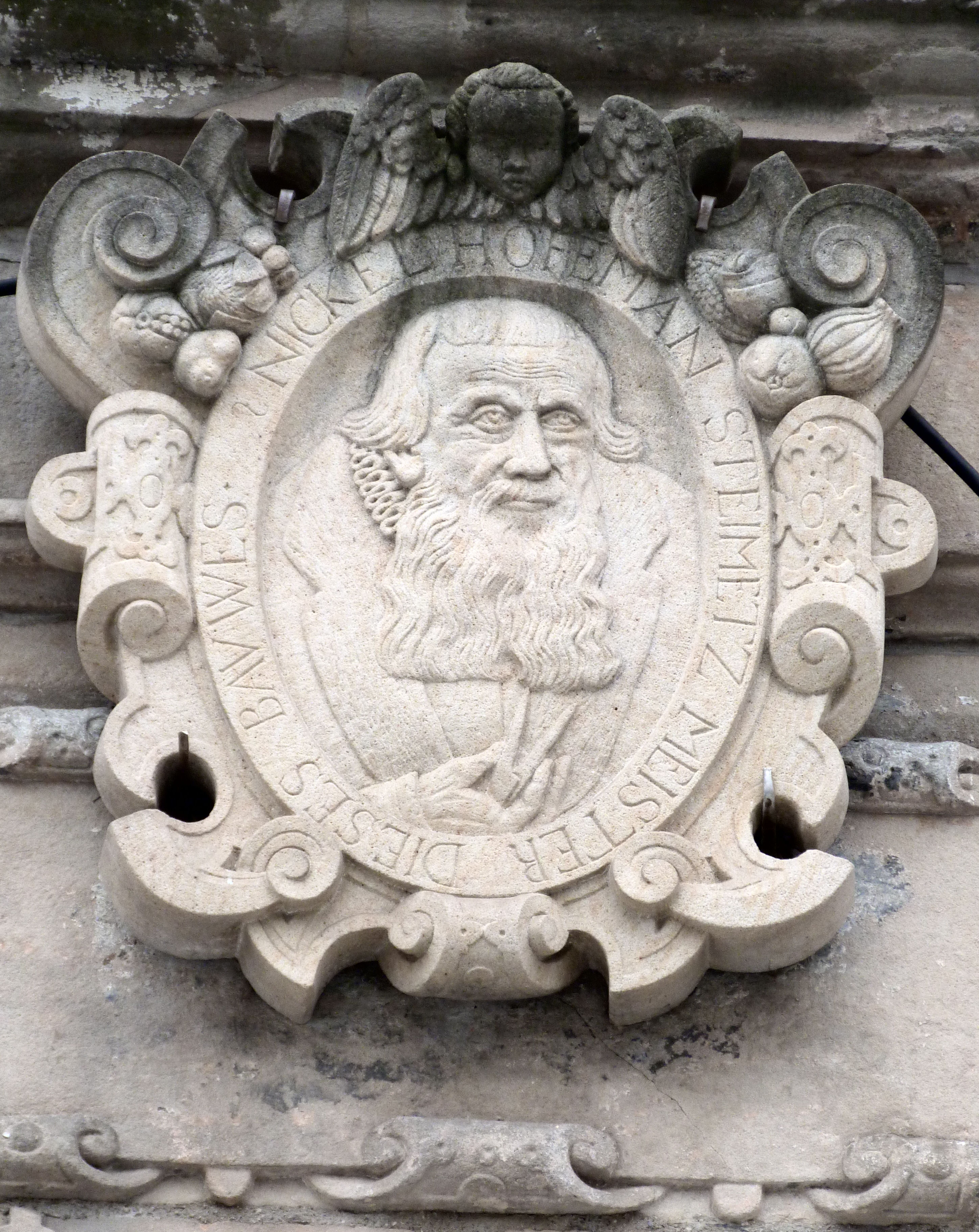

Nickel Hoffmann (also known as Nikolaus Hofmann, 1536 – 1592) was a German stonemason, sculptor, craftsman, and builder of the Great Masters in the later part of the Gothic Art movement and the Renaissance in central Germany.

== Life and work ==
Hoffmann was at Mansfeld involved in the mining there and had, at a young age, already reached relative prosperity. The Saxon towns of Torgau, Pirna and Halle were his favorite towns. In Pirna and Halle, he was also recognized as a citizen. He is especially known for his church and town hall buildings.

=== Work in Torgau ===
In 1536, he produced sculptural ornamental work for Wing C of Hartenfels Castle for Torgau. In 1543 and 1544 he worked again on Hartenfels Castle, but this time on wing B.

=== Work in Pirna ===
Hoffmann had his masterpiece in Pirna in, at the latest, 1539 - 1540. In 1540, he became a citizen in Pirna, where he also received orders from the Council. In 1555, during the period in which he mainly worked in Halle, he was a co-signatory of the order of masons of Pirna.

=== Work in Halle ===
From 1542 to 1543, he worked at the Marktkirche Unser Lieben Frauen in Halle. Whether Hoffmann already had operational planning for the work in Torgau has not been established. It is thought that he, with Jakob Hans from the now Czech city of Chomutov as polishing, took over construction management in 1545. In addition, he ran well on his own, with a sculpture in the woman cemetery and delivered a considerable amount of goods for the construction of the church. The church was completed under his direction until 1554th It was equipped with a vault, a gallery was built and the towers were increased. Hoffmann is often known as a foreman for this building.

During the construction period in 1550, Hoffman became a citizen of Halle. As in Pirna, he also took orders the Council of the city. Among other things, in 1557, he built the system of Stadtgottesacker and in 1580 the Wagegebäude am Markt. Between 1554 and 1557, he completed the curvature of the Moritzkirche. In 1568, he was responsible for expanding the town hall tower.

=== Other works ===
Hoffmann built the Südpartie City Hall in Merseburg in 1561 and, 1563 from 1566, the town hall in Hof in Upper Franconia. In 1568, he briefly was the oldest foreman at the palace of Augustus Castle under Hieronymus Lotter. In the years 1563-1569 he was able to switch from Paul Widemann the contract for the construction of the choir of St. Mary at Zwickau secure along with his brother Philipp Hoffmann.

This was followed by the construction of the town hall in Schweinfurt between 1569 and 1572. This was his main work on the room grouping, façade and detail processing and deemed a feat of German Renaissance art. In 1570 he refereed in Rothenburg with their Town Hall building.

== Legacy ==
In Hof, there is a street named after Hoffman, Nikolaus Hoffman Street; Nickel Hoffmann street is another street in Halle.
