= Czech Lute =

Musical composition by Adam Michna z Otradovic

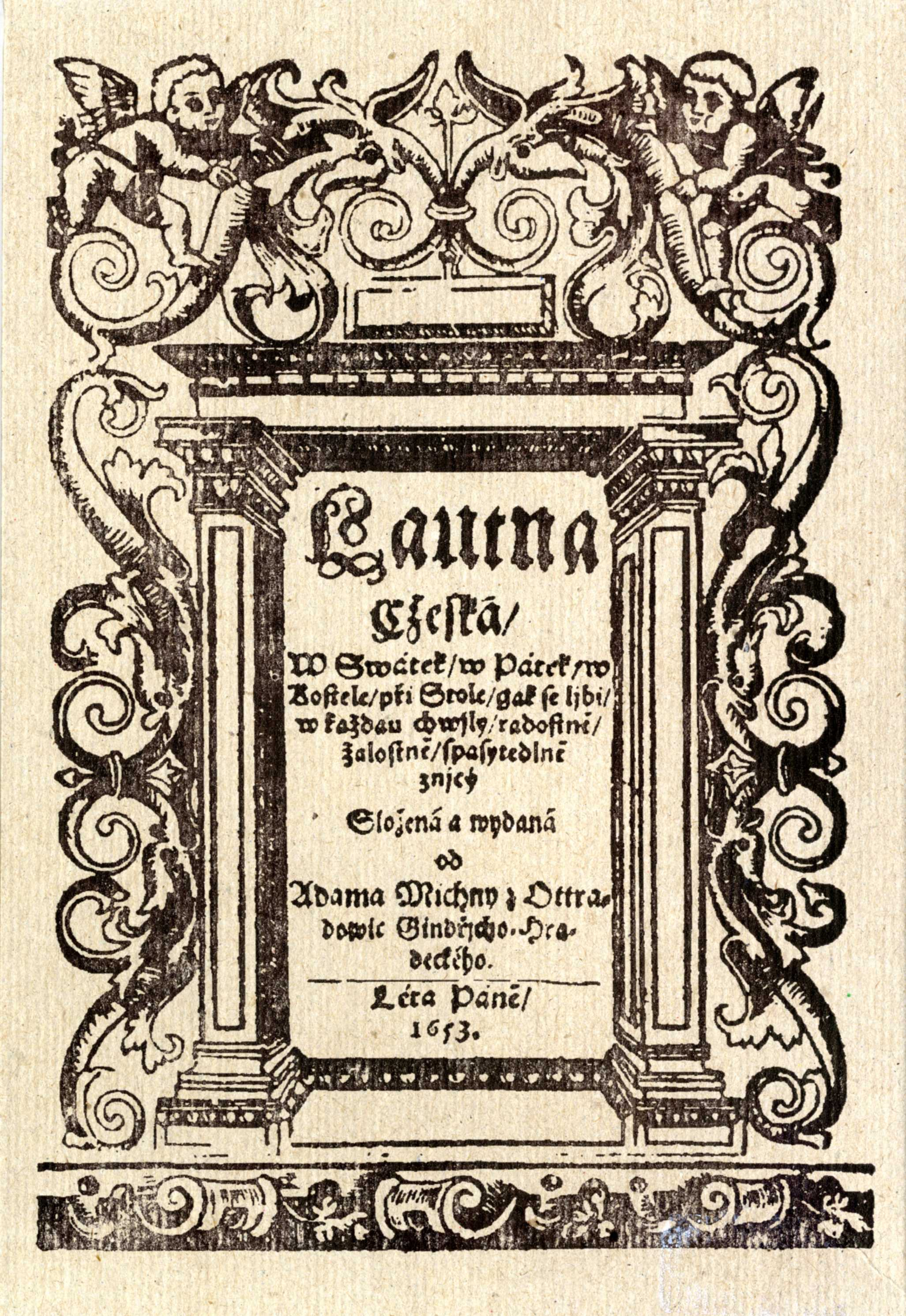
Czech Lute, front cover of the first edition (1653)

The Czech Lute (in modern Czech orthography: Loutna česká; the full original title Lautna Cžeská, W Swátek, w Pátek, w Kostele, při Stole, jak se líbi, w každau chwíli, radostně, žalostně, spasytedlně znící) is a classical piece written by the Czech composer Adam Michna z Otradovic. It is one of the early examples of the Czech Baroque music, originating from the seventeenth century (more precisely, from 1653). The whole piece is made up of 13 parts describing specific stories. The first one is called "Foreword" and it is about a marriage between a man and a woman. The following texts talk about historical stories, for example the fate of Paris and Troy or the story of Jesus and Mother Mary.

This collection of songs was composed for one alto, one soprano and two tenors, but it can be sung by larger choirs. Adam Michna himself is considered to be one of the most important Czech composers of the Baroque period and the Czech Lute is thought to be the peak of his career along with the Songs for Mother Mary. The ninth part, Anjelské Přátelství (The Fellowship of Angels) has become one of the most popular songs by Adam Michna. The first five verses (Nebeští Kavalérové) are played on Malostranské náměstí in Prague every hour by a trumpeter.

The violin ritornelli, to be played between stanzas, had been lost and so were reconstructed for a 1998 edition by Michael Pospíšil for contemporary audiences. Then, in 2014, Czech musicologist Petr Daněk discovered the complete missing originals in the Franciscan library in Slaný. These proved to be unexpectedly complex and virtuosic, at variance with Pospíšil's imagined fluid simplicity. According to Music Director Adam Viktora of Ensemble Inégal, a Czech music ensemble that in 2015 published a CD of the complete work recorded in Slaný, "The use of instruments in Michna's Czech Lute was in effect much more restrained than has been generally assumed and practiced by musicians up till now."

== Structure ==
The 13 parts are:

1. Předmluva
2. Povolání Duchovné Nevěsty. Dialogus.
3. Matka Boží slavná Nadaní
4. Svadební Prstýnek
5. Panenská Láska
6. Žehnání s Světem
7. Duchovní Svádební Lázeň. Díl První/Díl Druhý
8. Dušivěno. (+Díl Druhý)
9. Anjelské Přátelství
10. Svádební Věneček
11. Den Svádební
12. Domácí Vojna mezi Duši a Tělem
13. Smutek bláznivých Panen

== Score ==
- Michna z Otradovic, Adam (1998). Pospíšil, Michael (ed.). Loutna Česká (in Czech). Brno: Collegium pro arte antiqua. (canto, organo, violini, basso)
