= Johann Gotthilf Ziegler =

German Baroque composer and organist

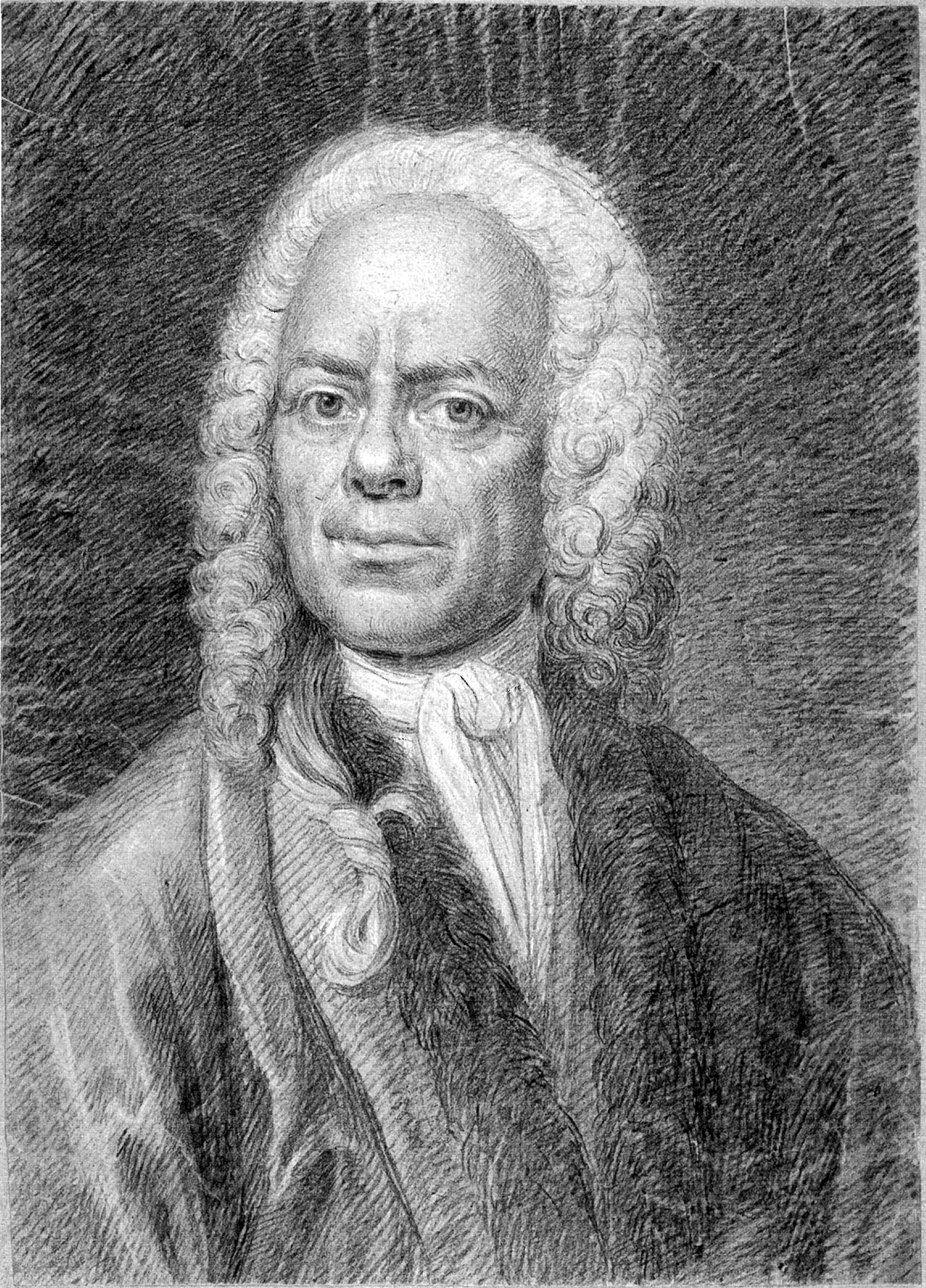
- Born: 25 March 1688; Leubnitz
- Died: 18 September 1747 (aged 59); Halle an der Saale
- Era: Baroque
- Spouse: Anna Elisabeth Krüger

Johann Gotthilf Ziegler (25 March 1688 in Leubnitz, Electorate of Saxony – 15 September 1747 in Halle an der Saale) was a German baroque composer and organist. He is a descendant of a musical family, not unlike that of J.S. Bach, though on a somewhat smaller scale, and belongs, together with Gottfried Kirchhoff and Friedrich Wilhelm Zachow to the group of composers of the so-called Hallischen Spätbarock. His father was the schoolhead and organist Daniel Ziegler (born 1630), son of the Saxon schoolteacher Johann Ziegler.

== Life ==
Ziegler had already caused a stir as a child prodigy at the Dresdener court of August the Strong, as his contemporary Johann Gottfried Walther, a distant cousin of Bach, wrote in his Musicalischem Lexicon that he could sing at the age four, play the keyboard a couple of years later, and as a 10-year-old play the organ at religious services.

Gotthilf became a pupil of Christian Petzold, organist of the Sophienkirche. He also studied three years in the Collegium musicum des Paedagogium regium of August Francke, in Halle, where he also studied law and theology for 3 years. In 1710 he became a pupil of Friedrich Zachow (who was also the teacher of Johann Philipp Krieger and none other than George Frideric Händel. In 1715 Gotthilf also took lessons with Johann Sebastian Bach, especially in the art of choral music.

In 1714 he became assistant of the organist A. Meissner in the Ullrichskirche in Halle. Four years later he succeeded Meissner as organist and Director musicis until his own death in 1747. He also acted as Bach's agent in the sale of various musical printings. Ziegler was married to Anna Elisabeth Krüger, with whom he had 5 children. His daughter Johanna Charlotte Ziegler (1725–1782) was a poet and wrote texts for some of Bach's cantatas, A cousin was the composer and organist Christian Gottlieb Ziegler.

== Works ==
- Four annual cantata cycles with lyrics by Christian Friedrich Hunold
- Christi Glieder, Christi Brüder, cantata (1717)
- Da hörst du, Mensch, was deines Gottes Wille, cantata (1716)
- funeral music.
