= Siegmund Jakob Baumgarten =

German Protestant theologian (1706–1757)

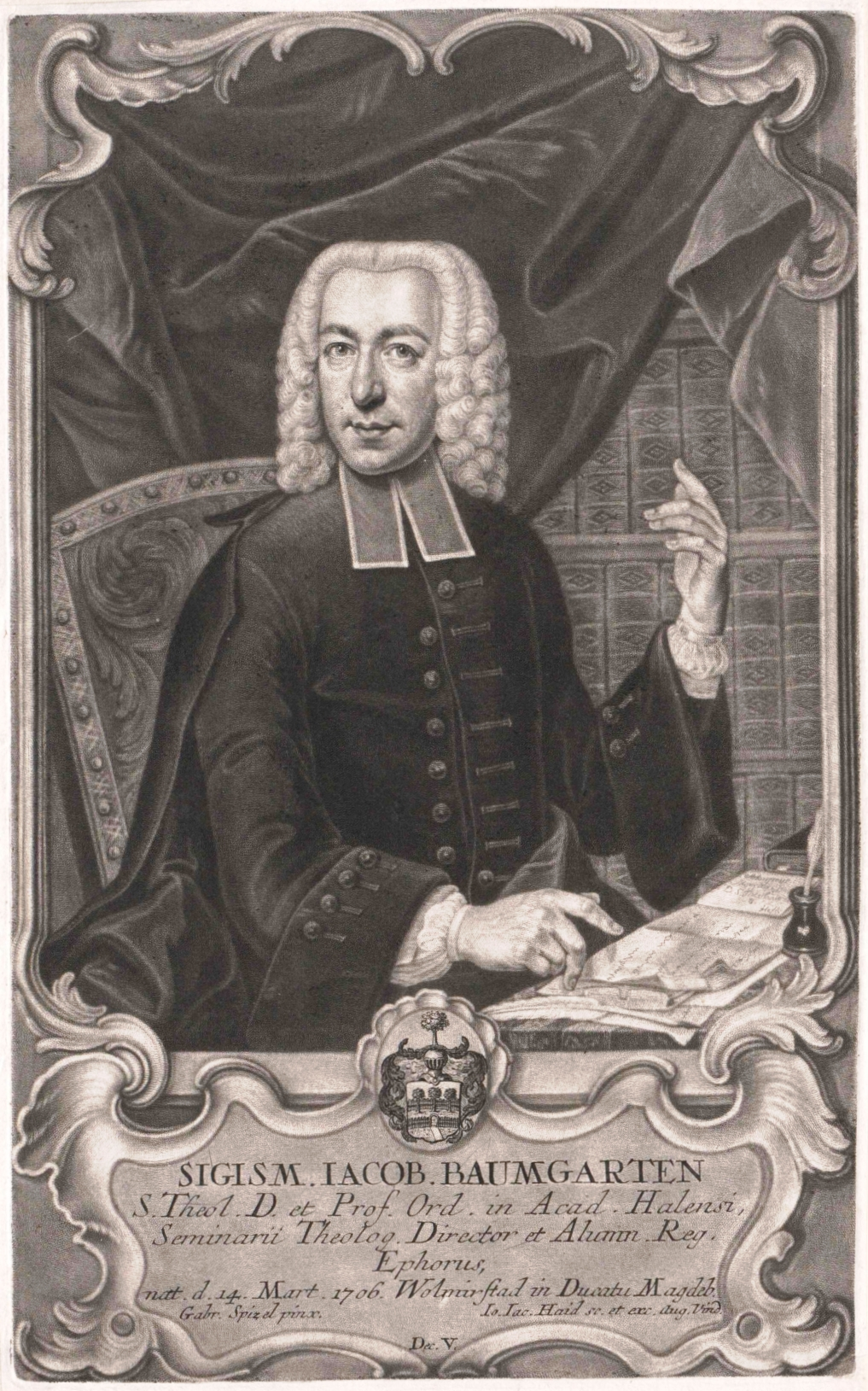
Siegmund Jakob Baumgarten

Siegmund Jakob Baumgarten (/ˈbaʊmɡɑːrtən/; German: [ˈbaʊmˌgaʁtn̩]; 14 March 1706 – 4 July 1757) was a German Lutheran theologian.

He was the brother of the philosopher Alexander Gottlieb Baumgarten (1714–1762).

== Biography ==
Baumgarten was born in Wolmirstedt, in the Duchy of Magdeburg.

He studied theology at the University of Halle, and in 1728, the 22-year-old Baumgarten, a Hallensian Pietist and bibliophile, was appointed as minister of the Marktkirche Unser Lieben Frauen (Market Church of Our Dear Lady). In 1730, he became an extraordinary professor at Halle, where in 1734 he was appointed a full professor of theology. In 1748, he was named a university rector. At the end of his life, he translated encyclopedic articles and biographies from English into German.

Baumgarten was a follower of the philosophical teachings of Christian Wolff, and is regarded as a transitional theologian from the Pietism of Philipp Jakob Spener and August Hermann Francke to that of modern rationalism. He was a prodigious writer and published works on exegesis, hermeneutics, dogmatics and history. He was the editor of the first sixteen volumes of the Allgemeine Welthistorie (General World History), which, after his death, was continued by his assistant Johann Salomo Semler.

Baumgarten died in Halle, Magdeburg.

== Bibliography ==
- Dissertatio theologica de dictis Scripturae Sacrae probantibus. Hendel, Halle 1735. (online)
- Admiranda singularis providentiae divinae vestigia in vindicanda per pacem Passaviensem A. 1552. et Augustanam A. 1555. sacrorum evangelicorum libertate. Halle 1755 (Digitized)
- Dissertatio theologico-moralis de gradibus peccatorum. Salfeld, Halle 1736. (online)
- Disputatio prima de Scriptura Sacra. Bauer, Halle 1739.
- Examen miraculi legionis fulminatricis contra Thomam Woolstonum. Bauer, Halle 1740. (online)
- Programmata cum appendice epistolarum. Bauer, Halle 1740. (online)
- Dissertatio theologica exhibens demonstrationem extra ecclesiam non dari salutem. Hilliger, Halle 1742. (online)
- Historia trisagii. Hilliger, Halle 1744. (online)
- Examen variarum opinionum de regno posterorum Abrahami in Aegypto. Hilliger, Halle 1744. (online)
- Auszug der Kirchengeschichte, von der Geburt Jesu an (Compendium of church history). 3 Bände. Bauer, Halle 1743–62. (online Band 1), (Band 2), (Band 3)
- Theses theologicae elementa doctrinae sanctioris ad ductum breviarii dogmatici Io. Anastas. Freylinghausen complexae. Waisenhaus, Halle 1746. (online der 2. Ausg. 1750)
- Nachrichten von einer hallischen Bibliothek (Notices from the Halle Library). 8 Bände. Gebauer, Halle 1748–1751. (online Band 1), (Band 2), (Band 3), (Band 4), (Band 5), (Band 6), (Band 7), (Band 8)
- Nachrichten von merkwürdigen Büchern (Notices of extraordinary books). 12 Bände. Gebauer, Halle 1752–58. (online Band 1), (Band 2), (Band 3), (Band 4), (Band 5), (Band 6), (Band 7), (Band 8), (Band 9), (Band 10), (Band 11.), (Band 12)
- Abris einer Geschichte der Religionsparteien, oder gottesdienstlichen Geselschaften, und derselben Streitigkeiten so wol als Spaltungen, ausser und in der Christenheit (History of religious parties). Gebauer, Halle 1755. (online)
