= Friedrich Wilhelm Zachow =

German musician and composer of vocal and keyboard music

- Born: 14 November 1663; Leipzig
- Died: 7 August 1712 (aged 48); Halle
- Occupations: Composer; Organist
- Organizations: Marktkirche Unser Lieben Frauen, Halle

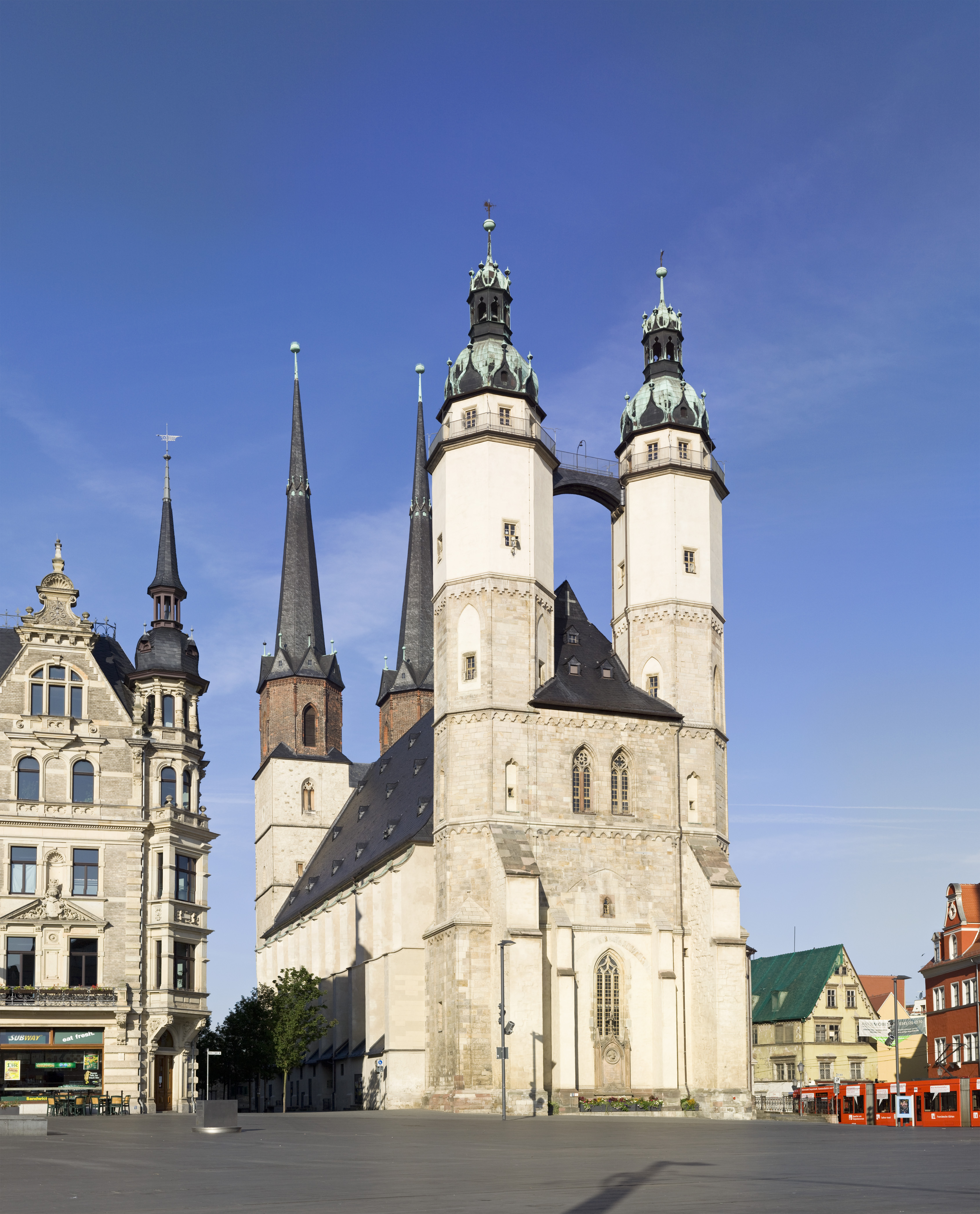
Market Church in Halle (Saale), seen from the Market Square

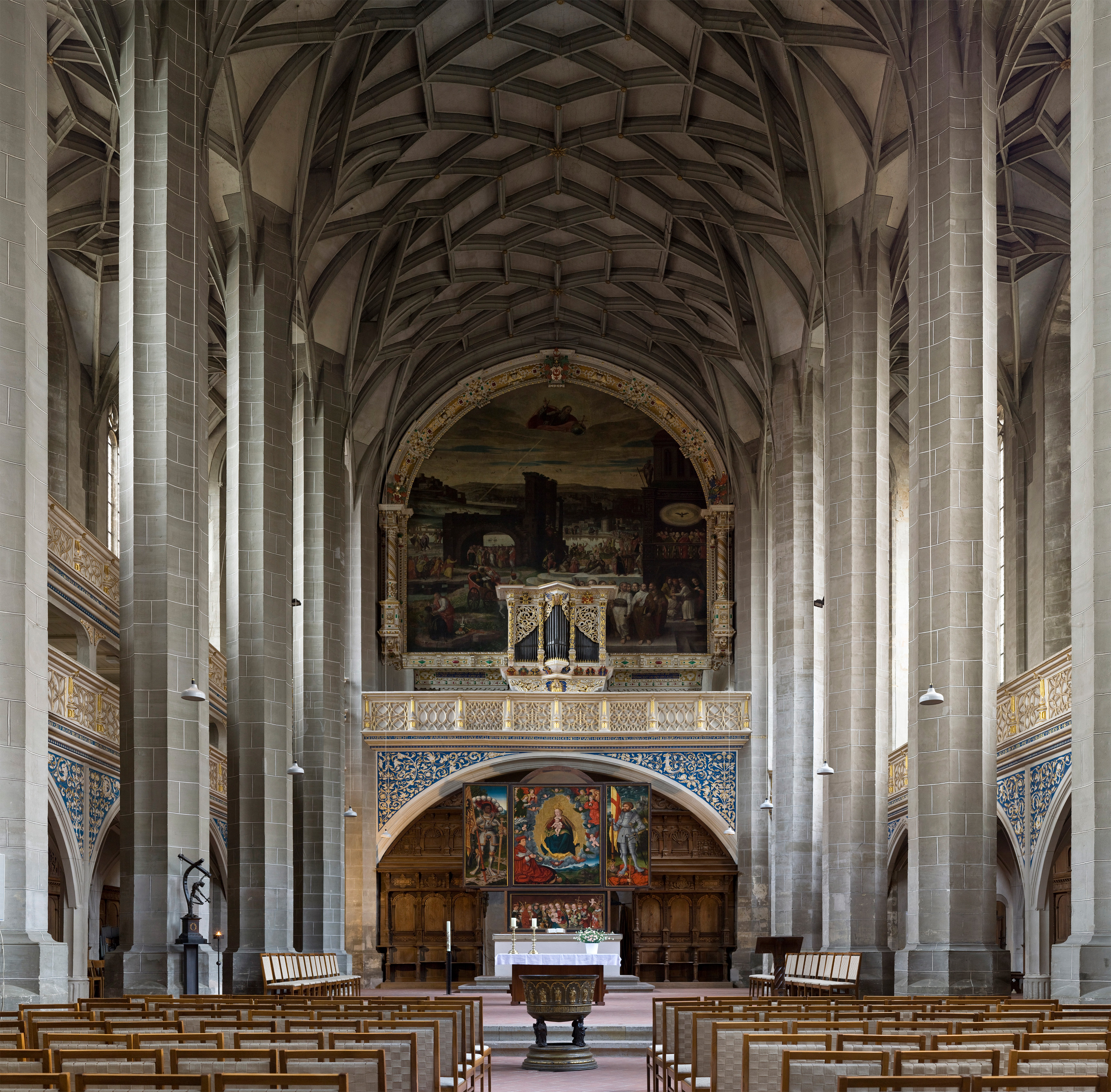
The Reichel organ in the Market Church

Friedrich Wilhelm Zachow or Zachau (14 November 1663 – 7 August 1712) was a German musician and composer of vocal and keyboard music.

== Life ==
Zachow was born in Leipzig. He probably received his training from his father, the piper Heinrich Zachow, one of Leipzig's town musicians in the Alta capella, and maybe from Johann Schelle, a leading German composer, when the family moved to Eilenburg. As Kantor and organist of Halle's Market Church in 1684 he succeeded Samuel Ebart. During his time at Halle he became particularly renowned as a composer of dramatic cantatas. In 1695 he was criticized by the pietists because of his excessive long and elaborate music, that could be only appreciated by cantors and organists. Zachow was influenced by Johann Theile in Merseburg and the poetry of Erdmann Neumeister, pastor in the nearby Weissenfels, and his criticism on pietism.

Zachow was the teacher of Gottfried Kirchhoff, Johann Philipp Krieger and Johann Gotthilf Ziegler, but is best remembered as George Frideric Handel's first music teacher. He taught Handel how to play the violin, organ, harpsichord, and oboe as well as counterpoint. Zachow's teaching was so effective, that in 1702, Handel accepted a position as organist at the former Dom in Halle at age seventeen. It is said that after Zachow died in 1712, Handel became a benefactor to his widow and children in gratitude for his teacher's instruction. In 1713 J.S. Bach was invited as Zachow's successor.

Handel continued to use Zachow's compositions in his own works, not simply quoting, but also in terms of instrumental colour; for example the cantata Herr, wenn ich nur dich habe, which is unique in having a harp solo in the German cantata repertoire, was copied by Handel, taken to London, and may have influenced the instrumentation of Saul and Esther.

Zachow died in Halle at age 48.

== Selected works, editions and recordings ==
- Mass – Missa super chorale Christ lag in Todesbanden (1701)
- Approximately 24 cantatas survive:

Chorus ille coelitum (1698)
Confitebor tibi Domine (1701)
Danksaget dem Vater (1702)
(see also recordings below)

- Keyboard works: Toccata in C major, Präludium in C major, Präludium in F major, Fugue in C major, Two Fugues in G major, Fantasia in D major, Capriccio in d minor, Suite in b minor, several organ chorales
- Trio in F major for Flute, bassoon and Basso continuo
- Trio in D major for 2 Violins and Basso continuo

=== Recordings ===
- Complete Organ Music, Simone Stella - Brilliant Classics - BC 96022
- Christmas cantatas. Meine Seel: erhebt den Herren; Herr, wenn ich nur dich habe; Preiset mit mir den Herren; Lobe den Herrn, meine Seele Constanze Backes, Capella Frisiae & Accademia Amsterdam, dir. Ludger Remy. Quintone.nl 2010
- Easter cantatas. Ich bin die Auferstehung und das Leben. Bei Gott ist mein Heil, meine Ehre. Ach Herr, mich armen Sünder (attributed to Handel but probably by Zachow) Osterdialog Triumph, ihr Christen seid erfreut. Gudrun Sidonie Otto, Margaret Hunter, Christoph Dittmar, Cantus Thuringia, Capella Thuringia, dir. Bernhard Klapprott CPO 2010
- Christmas cantatas. Vom Himmel kam der Engel Schar. Es wird eine Rute aufgehen. Die Herrlichkeit des Herrn. Uns ist ein Kind geboren. Preiset mit mir den Herrn. Miriam Feuersinger, Benjamin Glaubitz et al. Cantus Thuringia, Capella Thuringia, dir. Bernhard Klapprott CPO 2026.
- Suite in B for harpsichord. Carole Cerasi - J.S. Bach and the Möller Manuscript - Metronome Recordings - METCD 1055
