= Antonín Reichenauer =

Czech baroque composer 1694–1730

Antonín Reichenauer (also known as Johann Anton Reichenauer; c. 1694 – 17 March 1730) was a baroque composer from Bohemia.

== Life ==
Reichenauer was born in c. 1694 Prague. Nothing is known about Antonín Reichenauer's childhood and upbringing. The first records are of his post as choirmaster in 1721 at the Dominican church of St. Mary Magdalene in Malá Strana in Prague. He was also associated with the chapel of Count Wenzel Morzin, for whom he regularly composed works. According to some sources, he also worked for Count Franz Joseph of the House of Czernin. In 1730, at the end of his life, he became an organist at the parish church in the southern Bohemian town of Jindřichův Hradec. He died there less than a month after taking office, aged 35 or 36.

== Works ==
Many of Reichenauer's works have survived in archives and libraries in Bohemia, Silesia, Saxony and Hesse. The existence of his works in various collections outside Prague suggests a popularity outside of his homeland. The library of the monastery in Osek lists a total of 40 works of sacred music by Reichenauer from the years 1720–1733.

Reichenauer was known as a prolific composer of church music. His musical output was strongly influenced by the school of Antonio Vivaldi, whom he often mentioned in his works. He was the first Bohemian composer of a pastoral mass (his "Missa Pastoralis" in D major was written in around 1720). A series of concertos for violin, oboe, bassoon, and cello, as well as orchestral overtures and trio sonatas are preserved to this day.

Since the beginning of the 21st century, the works of Reichenauer have begun to appear again in concert programs.

== Bibliography ==
Antonín Reichenauer: Concerto in G per oboe, due violini, viola e basso, [critical edition], edited and commented by Lukáš M. Vytlačil, Fontes Musicae Bohemiae 1, Togga, Prague 2016. 54 pp (score, facsimile and complete parts). (preface with an example)
