= Samuel Ebart =

German composer (1655–1684)

Samuel Ebart (1655–1684) was a German baroque composer.

He was Kantor and organist of Halle's Market Church, and on his death was succeeded by Friedrich Wilhelm Zachow. His best known surviving work is a solo motet Miserere Christe mei, which was among tenor Hugues Cuénod's concert pieces in the 1930s; it has also been recorded by soprano Ruth Ziesak.
