= Jan Josef Ignác Brentner =

Jan Josef Ignác Brentner (German: Johann Joseph Ignaz Brentner, surname also spelled Brenntner, Brendtner; 3 November 1689 – 28 June 1742) was a Czech composer of the Baroque era.

== Biography ==
Jan Josef Ignác Brentner was born into the family of the mayor of the town of Dobřany in the Kingdom of Bohemia. He seems to have preferred his middle name Josef/Joseph. Known information about his life comes mostly from time he spent in Prague, from 1717 to about 1720, where he published four collections of music. Brentner's opuses 1 and 3 are collections of sacred arias for voice, strings, and continuo, Harmonica duodecatomeria ecclesiastica (1716) and Hymnodia divina (1718 or 1719). In addition, Brentner published a collection of six offertories for chorus, strings, and continuo entitled Offertoria solenniora (1717) as his opus 2 and a collection of six chamber concertos, Horae pomeridianae seu Concertus cammerales (1720) as his opus 4. Brentner's patron was Raymond Wilfert, abbot of the Premonstratensian (Norbertine) monastery in Teplá, to whom the Op. 2 was dedicated. Brentner's funeral motets were written specifically for the Brotherhood of St. Nicholas Church in Prague.

Brentner died in his birth town Dobřany under unclear circumstances by drowning in the Radbuza River on 28 June 1742.

Although a great many of Brentner's works are known to be lost, a scattering of manuscript copies survive throughout the Czech lands and a large number of them are located in the Music Archive of the Bendiktinerstift in Göttweig, Austria. Still others have turned up, in modified versions, in Bolivia; no one knows exactly how Brentner's music managed to travel to South America, but most likely a number of his works were taken there by Jesuit missionaries – in this connection the names of Johann Joseph Messner and Johannes Frantze are mentioned.

Registries of lost collections belonging to provincial churches in central Europe bear witness to Brentner's works that are no longer extant.

Brentner's music fuses a simple and direct melodic component with a complex and highly ornamented instrumental accompaniment. Although Brentner has never been a famous name, his music has proved enduring—it was still being performed in Prague and Vienna (Hofkapelle) in the mid-19th century, and they have never stopped playing it in Bolivia.

== Compositions ==
- Harmonica duodecatomeria ecclesiastica op. 1 (Prague 1716)
- Offertoria solenniora op. 2 (Prague 1717)
- Hymnodia divina op. 3 (Prague 1719)
- Horae pomeridianae seu Concertus cammerales sex, op. 4 (Praha 1720)
- Laudes matutinae (= Offertoria solenniora op. 2)

== Recordings ==
- Concertos & Arias [op. 4 a selection from op. 1], Hana Blažíková – soprano, Collegium Marianum, Jana Semerádová, Prague 2009, Supraphon SU 3970-2, (Music from Eighteenth-Century Prague).
- Vesperae cum ordinariis psalmis, [selection from] Hymnodia divina op. 3 (Music of baroque Bohemia). Ensemble Inégal, Pražští barokní sólisté (Gabriela Eibenová, Barbora Sojková – sopranos, Lester Landenoye, Marta Fadljevičová – altos, Jaroslav Březina, Hasan El Dunia – tenors, Tomáš Král, Jaromír Nosek – basses), Adam Viktora. Praha 2008, Nibiru 0148-2211.
- [selection from Motetti pro defunctis, Offertoria solenniora op. 2 and Harmonica duodecatometria ecclesiastica op. 1], Ensemble Inégal (Gabriela Eibenová – soprano, Jaroslav Březina – tenor, Mathias Gerchen – bas, Hasan El Dunia, Martin Prokeš, Marián Krejčík, Helena Zemanová), Adam Viktora, Praha 2003, Nibiru 0144-2211.
- Music from the Missions and La Plata (Bolivian baroque Vol. 2), Florilegium and Arkaendar Bolivia Choir, Channel classics, 2006. Contains Brentner's Gloria et honore from op. 2.
- San Ignacio. L'opéra perdu des missions jésuites de l'Amazonie, anciennes réductions de Chiquitos et Moxos, Bolivie (Musique Baroque à la Royale Audience de Chacras 2), Gabriel Garrido, L'Ensemble Elyma, K617, 1996. Contains Brentner’s Cantemus Domino from op. 2.
