= Lukáš M. Vytlačil =

Czech historian, archivist and flutist

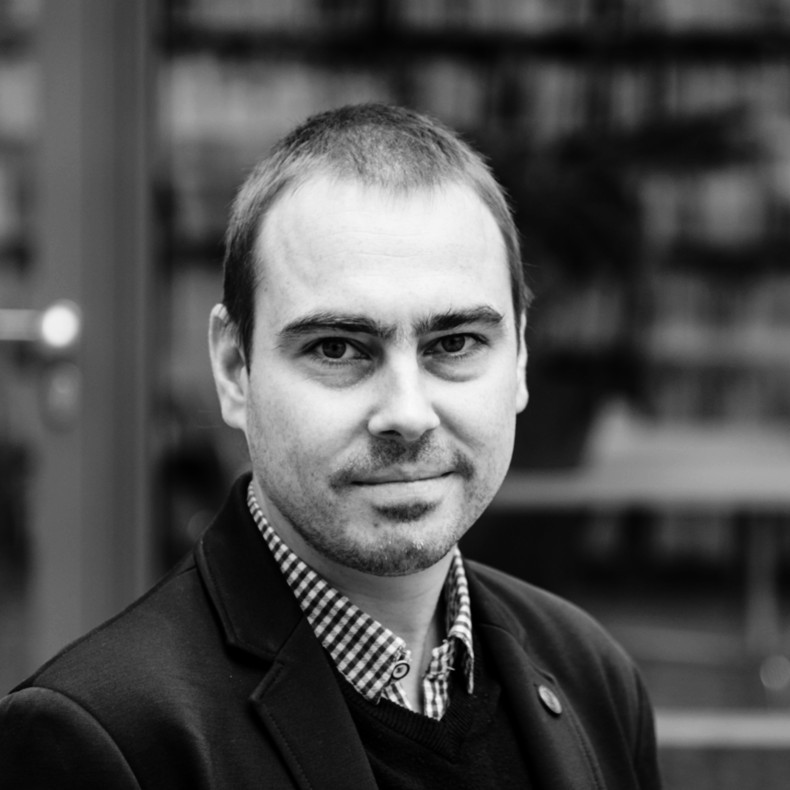
- Born: 23 April 1985 (age 41); Kladno, Czechoslovakia
- Education: Charles University, Prague
- Awards: 2007 – Leoš Janáček Foundation Prize; 2019 – Křesadlo 2018
- Scientific career
- Workplaces: Czech Academy of Sciences

Lukáš M. Vytlačil (Lukáš Michael; born 23 April 1985) is a Czech historian, archivist and flutist. He has been working at the Institute of History of the Czech Academy of Sciences.

== Curriculum vitae ==
After studying at the conservatory in Teplice, where he studied the transverse and recorder and later also conducting with Jan Valta, he continued at Charles University. Here he first graduated in the class of Jana Semerádová in the field of Historical Musical Practice, realized at the Faculty of Education (2011), and then at the Faculty of Arts musicology (2017). Under the leading of Rebecca Stewart, he also studied the interpretation of vocal polyphony and attended a number of interpretation courses with prominent musicians and educators, such as Peter Holtslag, Ashley Solomon, Barthold Kuijken, Jostein Gundersen, Anneke Boeke, Petr Zejfart, Jorge Salgado Correia and others.

In the years 2013–2018, he was a research assistant in the Department of Music History of the Institute of Ethnology of the Czech Academy of Sciences, 2018–2022 in the Biographical Archive of the Institute for Czech Literature of the CAS, and 2022–2024 in the National Heritage Institute. Since 2025, he works at the Institute of History CAS. Since 2021, he is also an archivist in the archive of the National Theater Prague. He is a member of the Czech National Committee of the International Council on Monuments and Sites and the Association of Historians of the Czech Republic. His research focuses mainly on the history of the late Middle Ages and the early modern period, the Reformation, music history and publishing activities. His publishing activity includes several monographs and editions, studies and articles, dictionary entries etc.

In music he devotes himself to the so-called historically informed interpretation as a flauto traverso and recorder player, conductor and vocalist. He is the artistic director of the Ensemble Sporck and also performs with other ensembles, such as Ensemble Inégal, with which he has participated in several recordings, Musica Florea, Capella Regia, etc. Between 2006 and 2008, he was the choirmaster of the children's choir Fontána in Teplice and as a conductor he also collaborated with the North Bohemian Philharmonic Orchestra and the Orchestra of the Youth Forum. From 2005 to 2009 he taught at the Conservatory in Teplice, and from 2014 to 2024 he led the recorder class at the Jan Deyl Conservatory in Prague.

=== Awards ===
- 2007 – Leoš Janáček Foundation Award
- 2019 – "Křesadlo" for the year 2018 by the Hestia Foundation for his charitable work in the Order of Saint Lazarus

== Bibliography (selection) ==
=== Monographies and editions ===
- Hrad a zámek Bečov nad Teplou. With Tomáš Wizovský, Kateřina Nývltová, Jiří Šindelář. Národní památkový ústav, územní odborné pracoviště v Ústí nad Labem, Ústí nad Labem 2025. ISBN 978-80-7480-220-1
- Vilém Blodek: Koncert D dur pro flétnu a orchestr / Concerto in D major for Flute and Orchestra / Konzert D-Dur für Flöte und Orchester. Klavírní výtah / Piano Reduction / Klavierauszug. Bärenreiter, Praha 2025
- Kronika obce Kačice 1932–1939 [Chronicle of the village of Kačice]. Togga, Praha 2019. ISBN 978-80-7476-146-1
- Antonín Reichenauer: Concerto in G per oboe, due violini, viola e basso. [A critical edition]. Fontes Musicae Bohemiae 1. Togga, Praha 2016. ISBN 978-80-7476-108-9
- Jan Olejník: Etudy a písničky pro příčnou flétnu = Etudes and Folt Songs for Flute. Amos Editio, Praha 2015
- Jacques Martin Hotteterre: Zásady hry na příčnou flétnu, zobcovou flétnu a hoboj. [Translation, introduction and notes]. Vyšehrad, Praha 2013. ISBN 978-80-7429-391-7
- Čtyři tvrziště na Slánsku. Hradečno, Humniště, Ostrov a Řisuty [Four fortresses at the Slaný region. Hradečno, Humniště, Ostrov and Řisuty]. Zapomenuté hrady, tvrze a místa 34. Petr Mikota, Plzeň 2006. ISBN 80-86596-70-2
