= Marktkirche Unser Lieben Frauen =

Church in Halle, Germany

Coordinates: 51°28′57.2″N 11°58′5″E

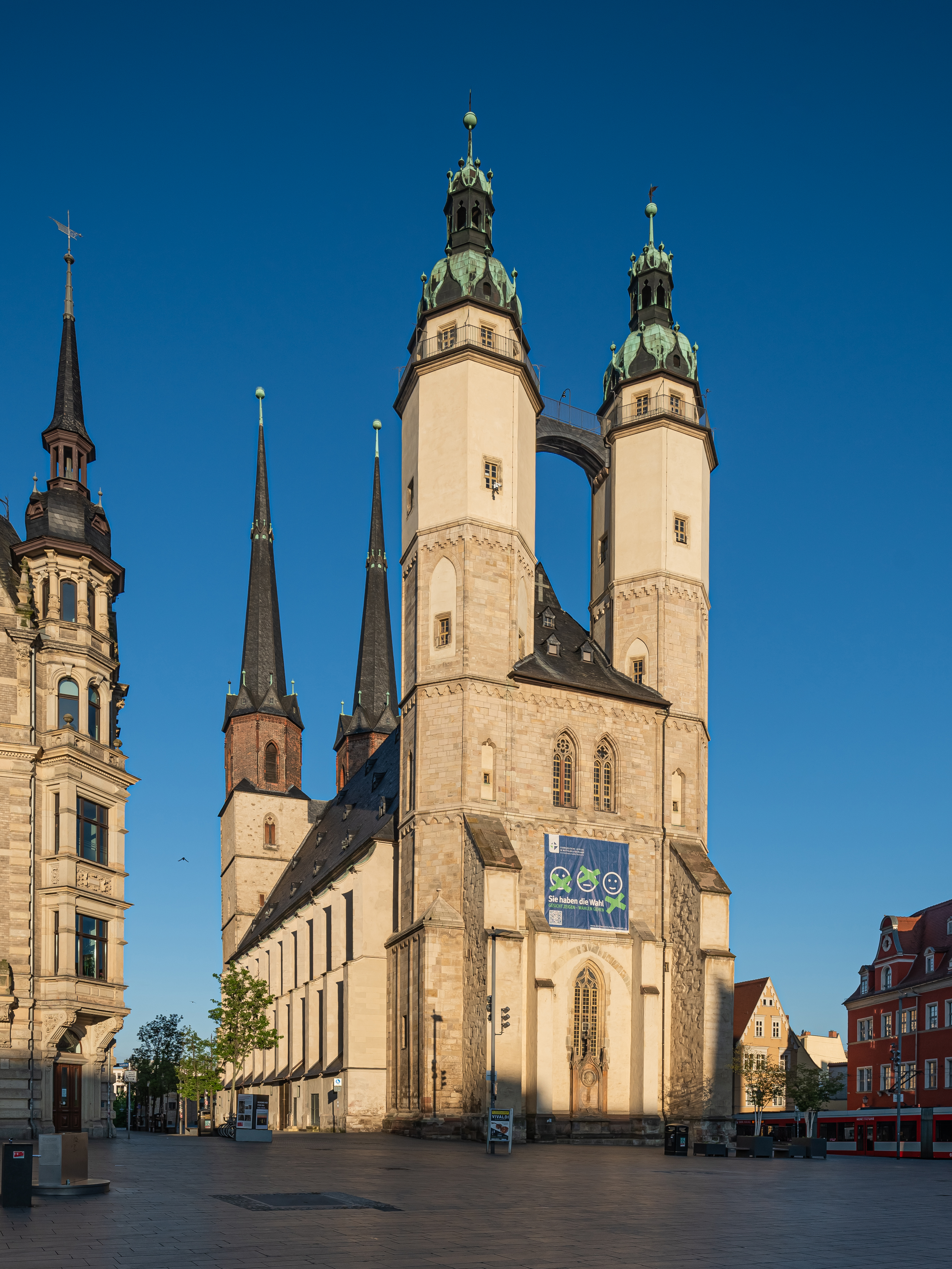
Marktkirche Unser Lieben Frauen in 2024

The Marktkirche Unser Lieben Frauen ("Market Church of Our Dear Lady") is a church in the centre of the city of Halle, Saxony-Anhalt, Germany. It was built between 1529 and 1554 and is the most recent of the city's medieval churches. In German, its official name is shortened to Liebfrauenkirche but it is also referred to as Marienkirche (St. Mary's Church) and the Marktkirche (Market Church).

The church replaced two former churches in the market area, their towers were integrated into the new building. The Market Church is considered one of the most important buildings of the late Gothic period in central Germany. Its four towers, together with the Red Tower, are the landmark of the city, hence its nickname "Stadt der fünf Türme" (City of the Five Towers).

Justus Jonas introduced the Reformation into Halle, and his friend Martin Luther preached in the church. George Frideric Handel was baptized here and received his first organ lessons. Johann Sebastian Bach inspected the new organ, and his son Wilhelm Friedemann Bach was an organist. The beginnings of both pietism and Enlightenment were connected to the church. Little damaged in World War II, the church is today a historic protected monument.

== History ==
The Market Church was built between 1529 and 1554 at the location of two predecessors, St. Gertrude and St. Mary. The Church of St. Gertrude to the west dated from 11th century and was the church of the salt makers in the center of Halle on the Hallmarkt, the salt market. The St. Mary's Church to the east dated from the 12th century and had been the parish church of the merchants and tradesmen of this mining town on the Marktplatz, the market square.

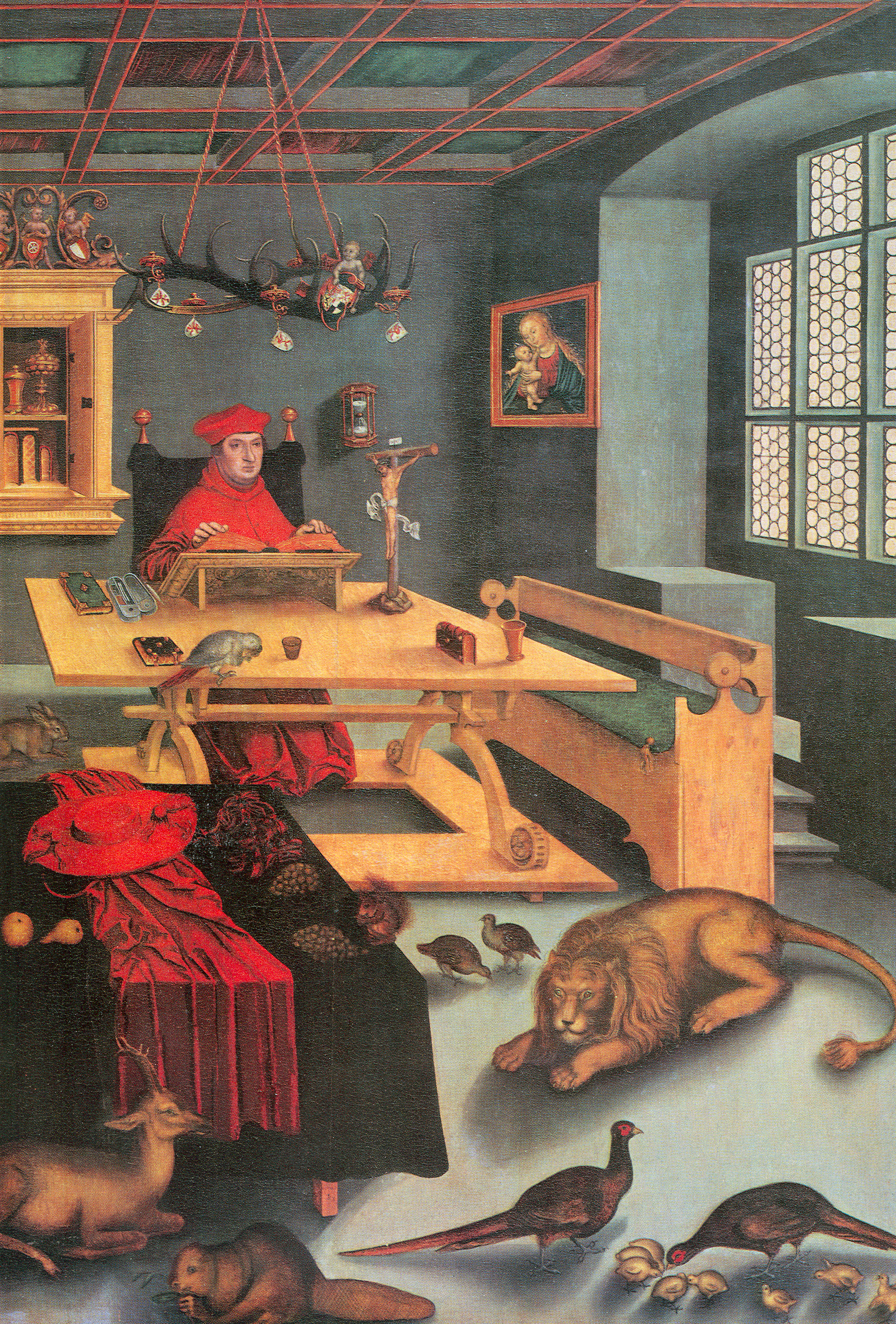
Albert of Brandenburg in his study (1526), by Lucas Cranach the Elder

Cardinal Albrecht of Brandenburg, Archbishop of Magdeburg and Elector of Mainz, needed a prestigious church that met his expectations at a central location in his Residenz town. Albrecht, who feared for his peace of mind in the heaven, had collected more than 8,100 relics and 42 holy skeletons which needed to be stored. These precious treasures known as "Hallesches Heilthum" and indirectly related to the sale of indulgences had triggered the Reformation a few years before. Notably on 31 October 1517 Martin Luther posted his famous 95 Theses, in which he condemned the trade with indulgences and sent a copy to his cardinal Albrecht, who in turn sent it to Pope Leo X. Then the cardinal and the Roman Catholic members of the town council wanted to repress the growing influence of the Reformation by holding far grander masses and services in a new church dedicated solely to Saint Mary. On Whit Monday, 17 May 1529, representatives of the clergy, the city council and church pastors gathered on the market square and decided, after extensive consultation, to demolish the existing parish churches, only keeping their towers, and connect the two (blue) western towers to those on the eastern side by means of a new nave. It was also decided to close the two cemeteries surrounding the churches. A new burial site was chosen – the Martinsberg, a hill outside the town – and the Stadtgottesacker cemetery was laid out. This cemetery with 94 arches, designed by Nickel Hoffman, is a masterpiece of the Renaissance.

=== Construction history ===
From 1529 to 1530 the old nave of St. Gertrude was demolished. What remained were the Blue Towers dating from around 1400, with their spires, which had been added in 1507 and 1513. On the east side the Watchmen's Towers (Hausmanntürme) of St. Mary's, with Late Romanesque bases and Renaissance upper stories, dating from 1551 to 1554, were linked by a bridge for the watchmen, who in case of fire and danger alerted the inhabitants by the ringing of the bells. Today, the watchman's room (Hausmannsstube) can be viewed on certain occasions.

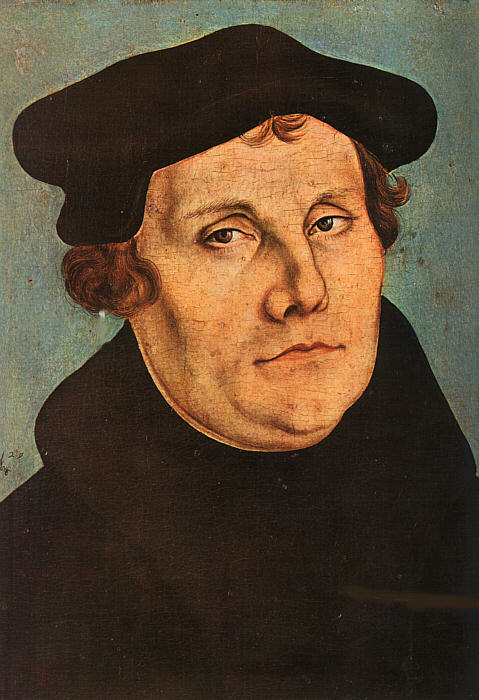
Martin Luther, portrait by Lucas Cranach the Elder, 1529

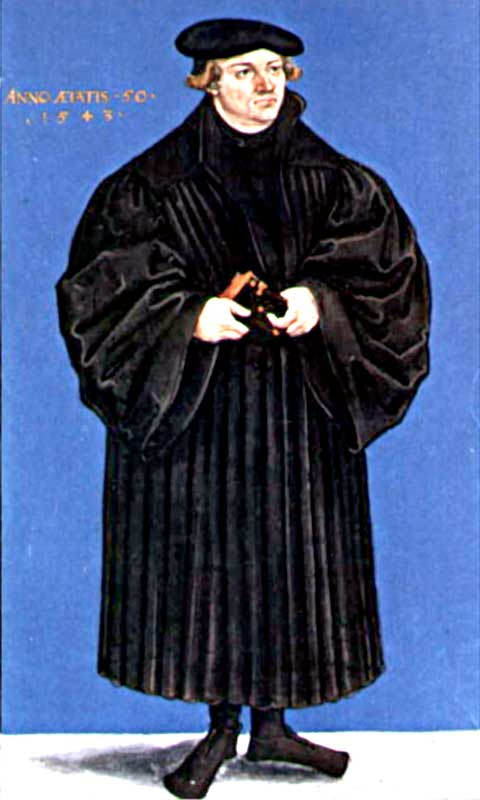
Justus Jonas in the Cranach family register, 1543

The new church built between the two pairs of towers is the last great hall church of the Upper Saxon Gothic style and is one of the outstanding architectural works of its days in Central Germany. It was designed by the town's master builder (Ratsbaumeister), Caspar Krafft. After his death in 1540 his successor, Nickel Hoffmann, took over the construction of the western end of the hall and the matroneum. The church was built in two phases, the first from 1530 to 1539 and, after a short interruption, the second from 1542 to 1554.

=== Subsequent history ===
The Market Church, which had been built to defend against the spread of Reformation sympathies, was the very spot where Justus Jonas officially introduced the Reformation into Halle with his Good Friday address in 1541. The service must have been at least partly conducted in the open air, because at that time construction had only been finished at the eastern end of the nave. Jonas began a successful preaching crusade and attracted so many people the church was overfilled. Cardinal Albert left the town for good, after the estates (Stände) in the city had announced that they would take over his enormous debt mountain at the bank of Jacob Fugger. Halle became Protestant and in 1542 Jonas was appointed as priest to St. Mary's and in 1544 bishop over the city. In 1545 and 1546 Luther preached three times in the church, staying with his friend Jonas during Christmas. In 1546 Luther died and his body lay in repose in Halle during his funeral procession from Eisleben to Wittenberg. In the same year Jonas was banished by Maurice, Elector of Saxony and left the city.

In 1625, during the Thirty Years War, the (converted) Wallenstein invaded the city; the inhabitants paid him almost a million Gulden a year for not housing his soldiers. When Samuel Scheidt lost his job because of Wallenstein, he was appointed in 1628 as musical director over three churches in Halle, including the Market Church.

=== Handel and the Bach family ===
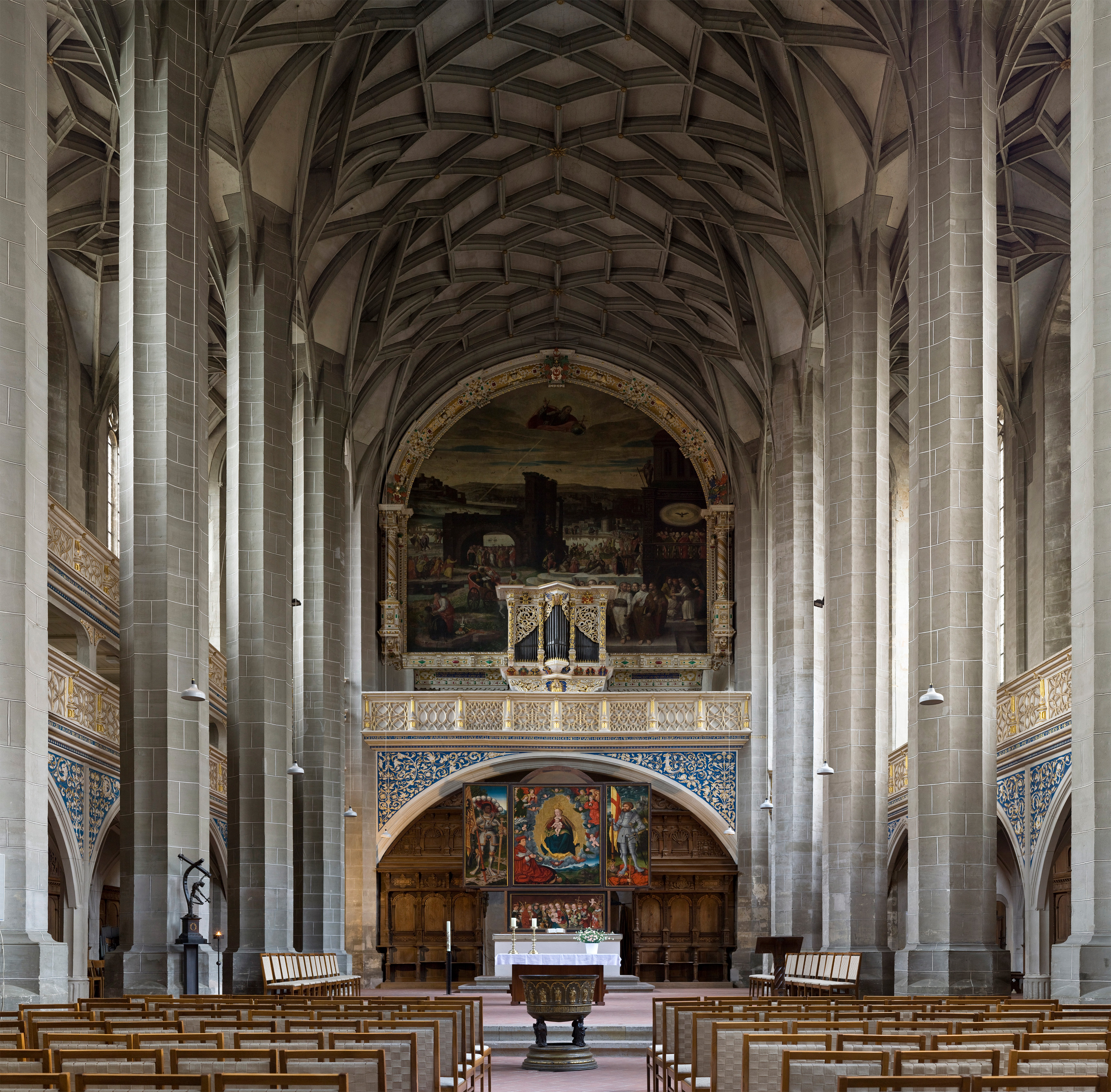
The small organ

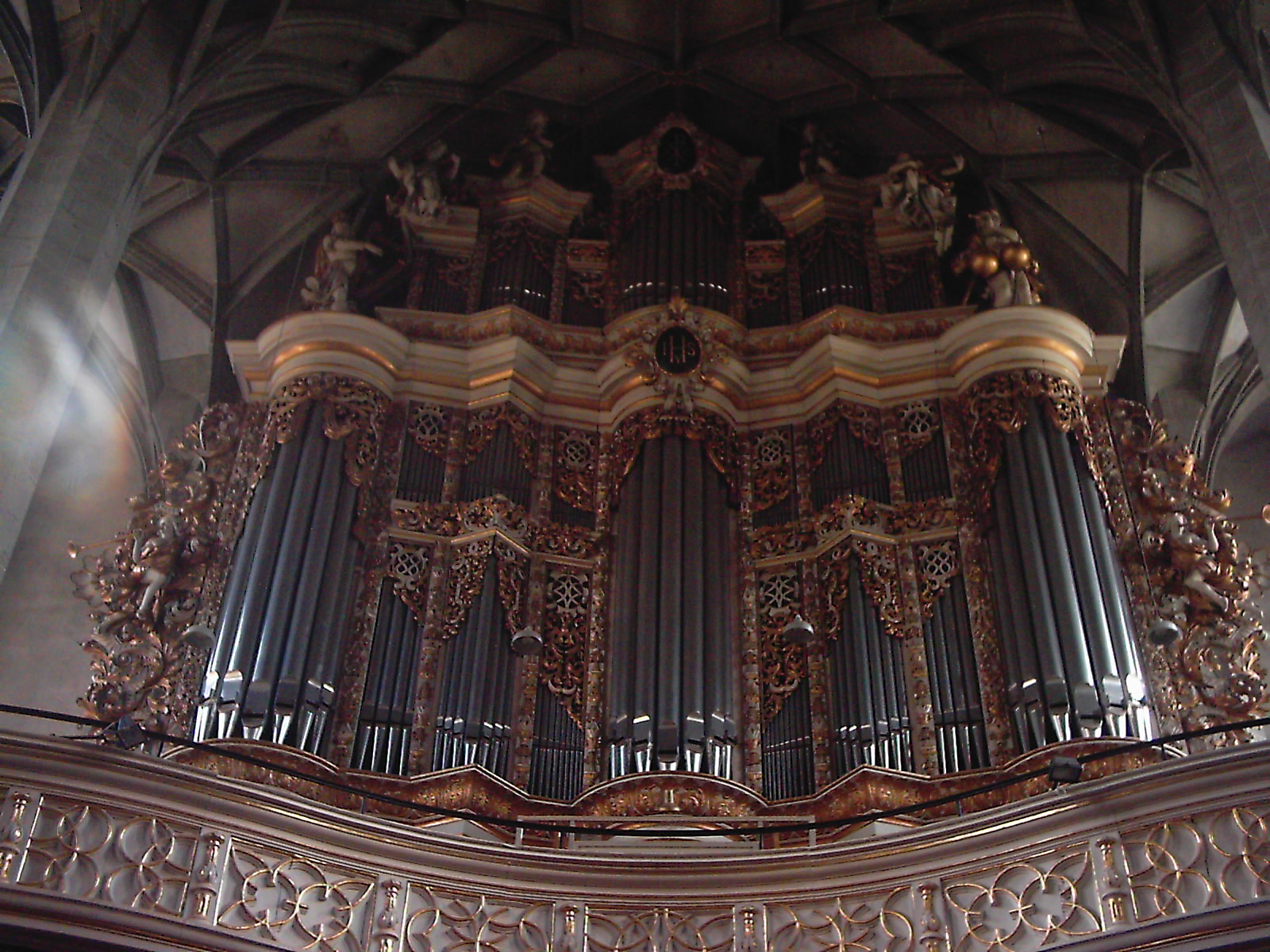
The main organ

On 24 February 1685, Handel was baptized in the Market Church. The small organ above the altar, built between 1663 and 1664, a replacement for an earlier model and not replaced since, is one of the oldest in Central Germany; the young Handel received his first organ lessons from Friedrich Zachau, who was in service since 1684.

In 1713, Johann Sebastian Bach was offered a post when he advised the authorities during a renovation by Christoph Cuntzius of the main organ in the west gallery. Bach turned the job down to stay in Weimar. Johann Kuhnau, Christian Friedrich Rolle and Bach played when it was inaugurated in 1716. The successor of Zachow, Gottfried Kirchhoff, a pupil of Pachelbel, had composed two cantatas for the occasion.

Musicologists debate whether Bach's earliest extant Christmas cantata Christen, ätzet diesen Tag, BWV 63, with two choruses and two duets, but no arias or chorale, on text probably written by the Halle theologian J.M. Heineccius was premiered here in 1713 or in 1715, or if it was performed for the bicentennial of the Reformation in 1717.

From 1746 to 1764, his son Wilhelm Friedemann Bach worked as an organist in the Market Church. In 1749 the Hallensian Bach, as he is sometimes referred to, had a dispute with his Kantor, Johann Gottfried Mittag, "who had misappropriated money due to Bach". In 1753 he made his first documented attempt to find another post, and thereafter made several others. W.F. Bach had at least two pupils, Friedrich Wilhelm Rust and Johann Samuel Petri. In June 1764, Friedemann left the job in Halle without any employment secured elsewhere. In 1768 he re-applied for his old job in Halle, without success. In or around 1770 he moved to Braunschweig and applied as a church organist.

== Pietism vs Early Enlightenment ==
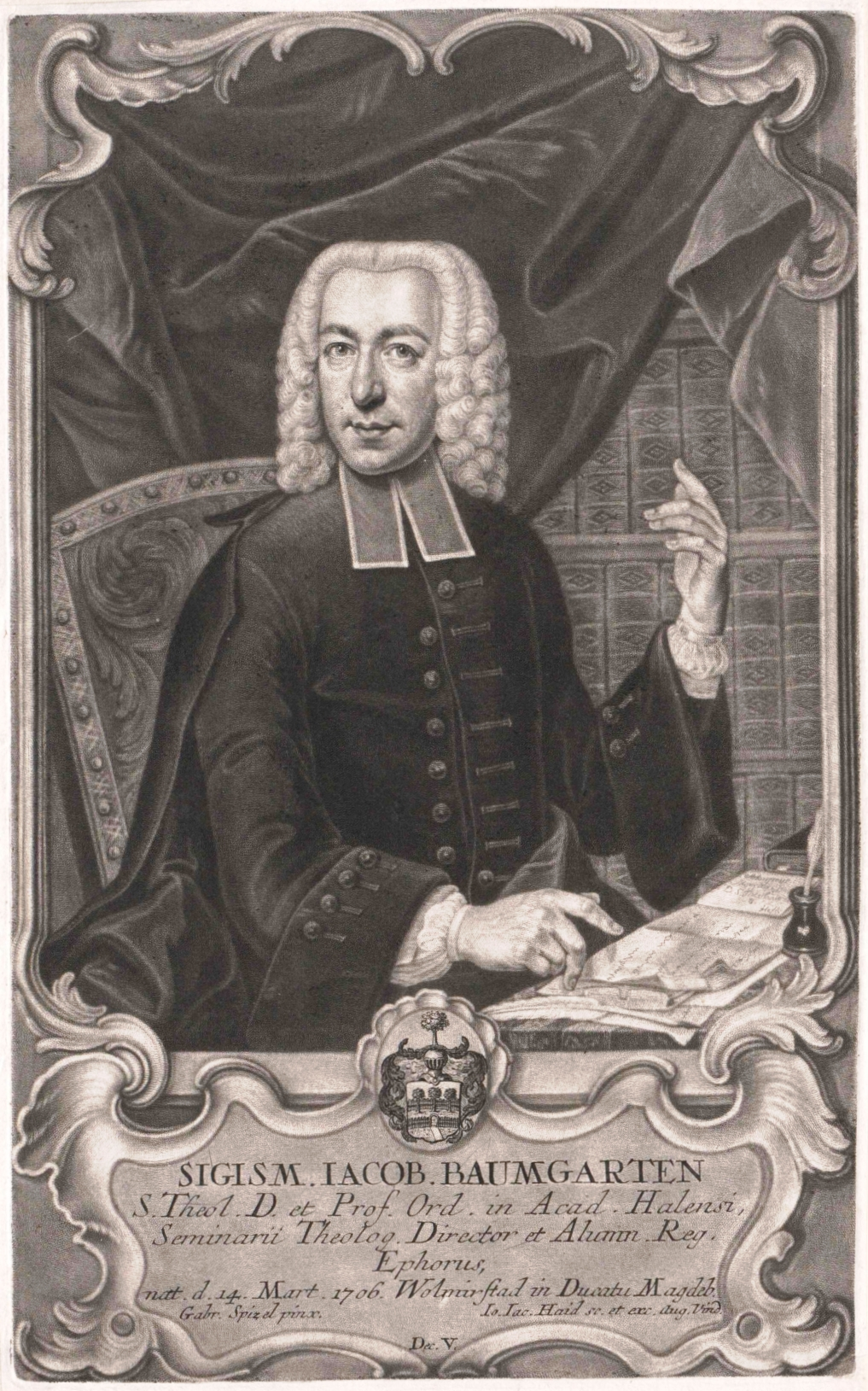
Siegmund Jakob Baumgarten, minister

In 1728, the 22-year-old Siegmund Jakob Baumgarten, a Hallensian Pietist and bibliophile, was appointed as minister of the church. In 1734 he became professor in theology and in 1748 rector of the Halle University. At the end of his life he translated encyclopedic articles or biographies from English into German, for example Samlung von merkwürdigen Lebensbeschreibungen grösten Theils aus der Britannischen Biographie (Collection of remarkable descriptions of lives mostly from Britain biography), published in 1757.

At the end of the 17th century, two important movements started in Halle which influenced many people during the 18th century: pietism and radical Enlightenment. These two movements can not be seen separately and influenced each other, but it came to a debate on grace or virtue between theologians and philosophers of the Friedrich's Universität, which was located next to the Market Church in the former Weigh house.

On 12 July 1723, Christian Wolff, a professor in philosophy and mathematics, held a lecture for students and the magistrates at the end of his term as a rector. His subject was practical Chinese philosophy, and he compared, based on a book by the Belgian missionary François Noël (1651–1729), Moses, Christ and Mohammed with Confucius. According to Voltaire, professor August Hermann Francke had been teaching in an empty classroom but Wolff attracted with his lectures around 1,000 students from all over. In the following up Wolff was accused by Francke of fatalism and atheism. In November he had to leave the city within 48 hours; his successors were Joachim Lange, a pietist, and his son. According to Jonathan I. Israel "the conflict became one of the most significant cultural confrontations of the eighteenth century and perhaps the most important of the Enlightenment in Central Europe and the Baltic countries before the French Revolution."

What happened in Halle should not be seen as an isolated case, but as trendy and fashionable. Around 1720 Chinese porcelain was loaded in enormous quantities to Europe. In the Albrechtsburg the Meissen porcelain manufactory had been started up to copy it and Chinoiserie was popular among artists and buyers. In 1726 Wolff published his Discours, in which he again mentioned the importance of listening to music put on pregnant Chinese women, and had reworded some on Moses. In 1736 a research was started to evaluate the case and in 1740 (or 1743) Wolff was reappointed by the philosopher-king Frederick the Great. It is possible the eminent professor, in between a member of the Royal Society and the Academy of Sciences in Berlin, introduced Wilhelm Friedemann Bach to the Prussian court.

In 1840 and 1841, the layout of the altar area was changed based on plans by Wilhelm August Stapel and Karl Friedrich Schinkel. The historical artist, Julius Hübner painted a new altarpiece of the Sermon on the Mount with the text Schaut die Lilien ("Consider the lilies" or "Look at the lilies").

== After World War II ==
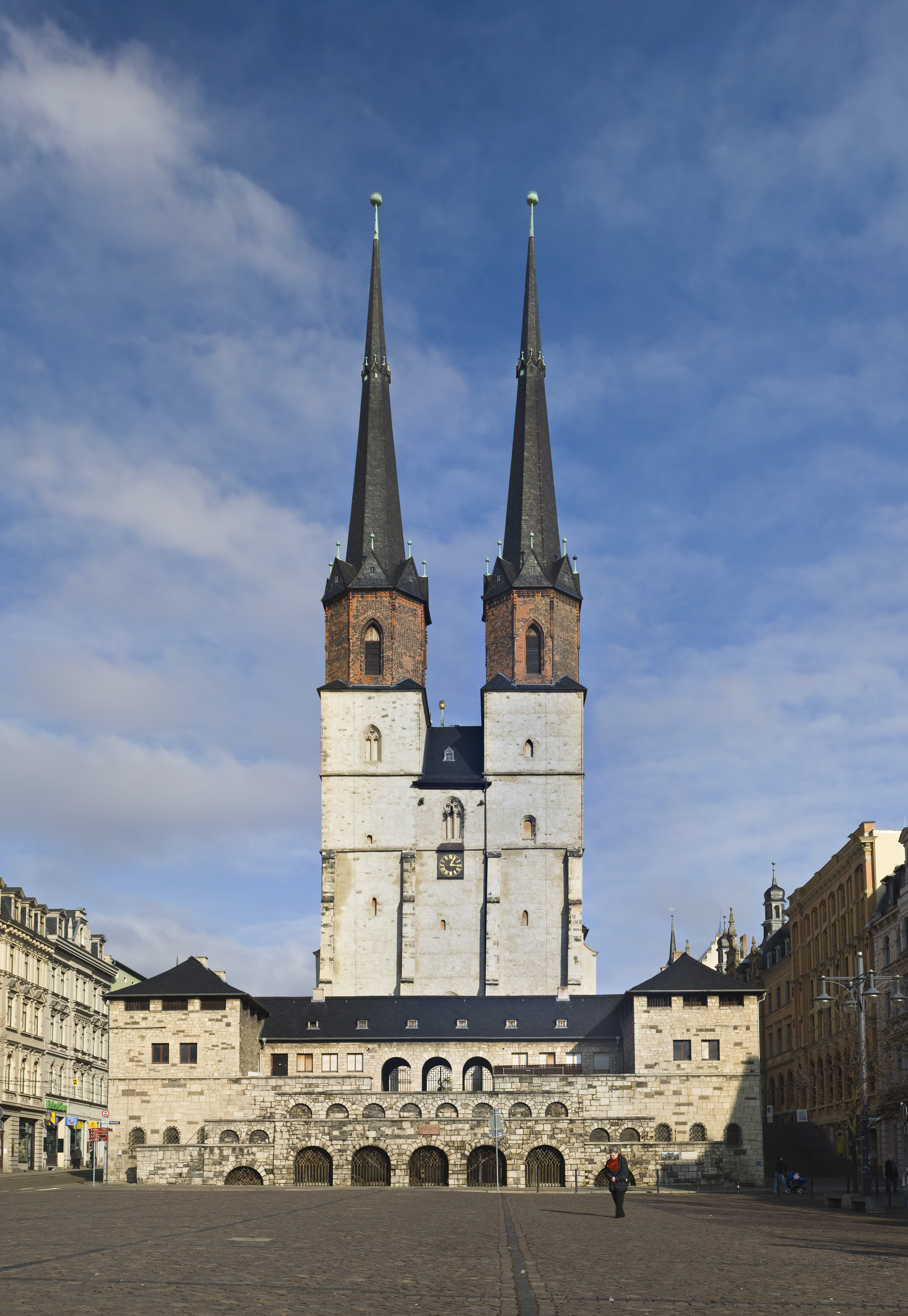
Westside from the Hallmarkt. The fact that the western pair of towers are slightly crooked has its origin in a tectonic fault, called the Halle Marketplace fault.

The Market Church has not undergone any permanent changes to its external and internal appearance over its history. During the air raid on the centre of Halle shortly before the end of the war on 31 March 1945 it was, however, badly damaged. One bomb penetrated between the northern Watchmen's Tower and the nave (Langschiff) and tore one of the two pillars of the northern colonnade away, whereby part of the vaulted ceiling collapsed. That damaged the bronze font by Meister Ludolf. As a result of the artillery bombardment on 16 April 1945 the tracery window on the west front behind the organ was shattered, and the church roof and spires of the Watchmen's Towers damaged. The restoration work lasted from January 1946 to the beginning of 1948. Major repairs had to begin in 1967, when the entire interior and furnishings were badly damaged by a burst district heating pipe, which was part of the church heating system. The subsequent repair in the years from 1968 to 1983 was one of the biggest monument maintenance and restoration projects of the East German period. The work was conducted under the direction of the Institute for the Preservation of Historic Monuments. (Institut für Denkmalpflege). It was decided to restore, as far as possible, its appearance in the 16th century. For example, even the original polyptych was returned to its old spot and Hübner's altarpiece was brought out of the sacristy and displayed behind it.

== St Mary's Library ==
Near the Market Church is St Mary's Library (Marienbibliothek), which is considered to be the oldest community Protestant church library and one of the largest of its kind in Germany, founded in 1552 by Sebastian Boetius, senior pastor of the church. Between 1552–1609 the library's collection was stored in the southern Hausmannsturm (Houseman's tower) of the Marktkirche (Market Church). It was subsequently moved to a dedicated Renaissance-style library in 1609 (and in 1888 to a new building located An der Marienkirche 1). Until the establishment of the Friedrich's Universität in 1694, by August Hermann Francke with the aid of Christian Thomasius and Philipp Jakob Spener – the lectures were not held in Latin, but in German – it was the only public (or non-private) academic library in the city. Students were encouraged to visit this library.

== Museum ==
In memory of the Reformation and Martin Luther, a small Luther Museum was established in the basement of the Blue Towers in May 2006. Amongst the objects on display are the death mask made of him on 19 February 1546 and impressions of his hands.
