= Czech Christmas Mass =

Pastoral mass written by Jakub Jan Ryba

Česká mše vánoční
- Pastoral mass by Jakub Jan Ryba
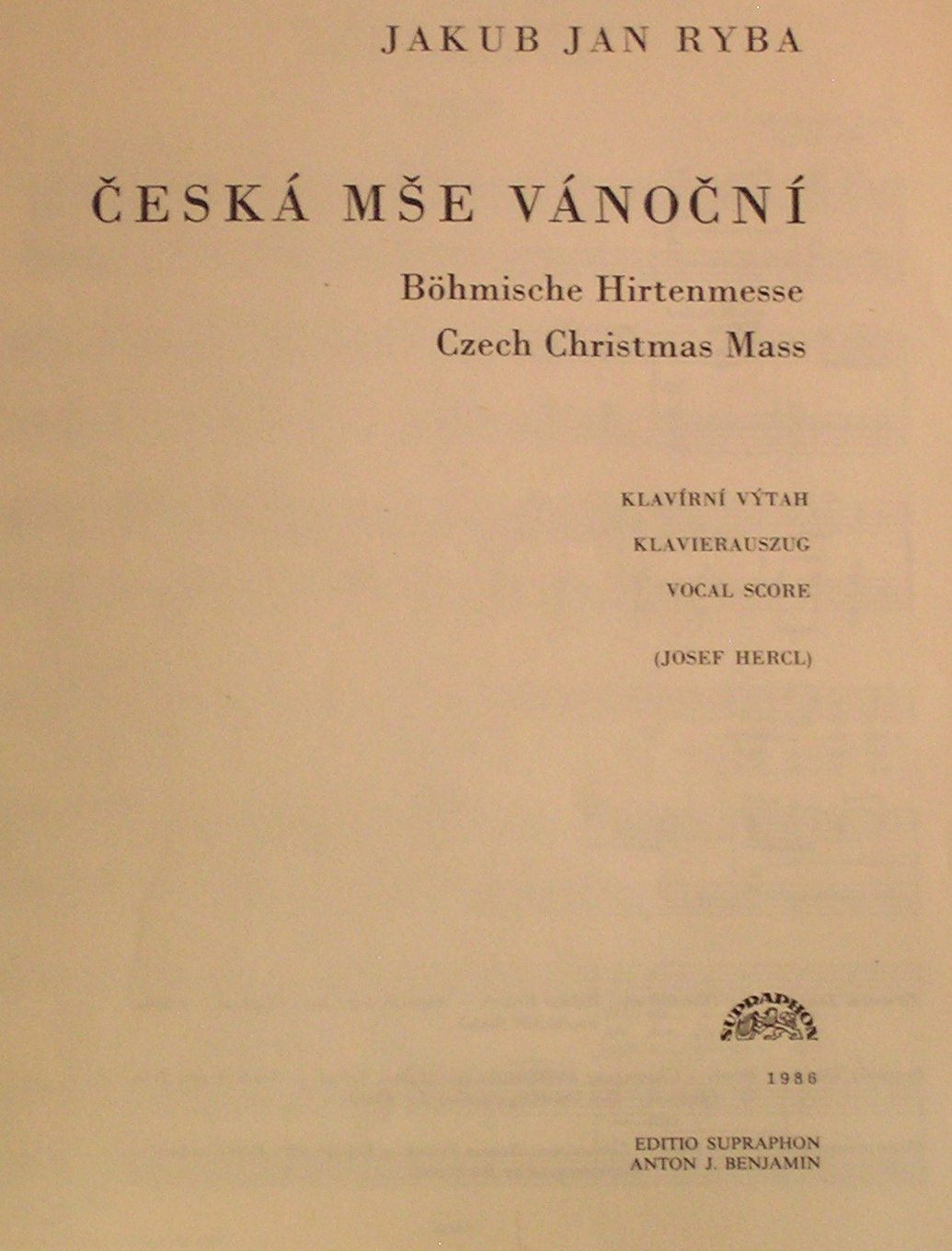
- Title page of a piano reduction
- English: Czech Christmas Mass
- Full title: Missa solemnis Festis Nativitatis D. J. Ch. accommodata in linguam bohemicam musikamque redacta per Jac. Joa. Ryba
- Language: Czech
- Composed: 1796
- Movements: 9
- Scoring: Four soloists; choir; orchestra; organ

Czech Christmas Mass (Czech: Česká mše vánoční; Latin: Missa solemnis Festis Nativitatis D. J. Ch. accommodata in linguam bohemicam musikamque redacta per Jac. Joa. Ryba) is a pastoral mass written by the Czech composer Jakub Jan Ryba in 1796, a mass in name only and thus an anomalous example of its genre (Missa pastoralis, less often Missa pastoritia). Because of its opening words, it is also known as Hail, Master! or Hey, Master! (in Czech: Hej, mistře!). Czech Christmas Mass was composed following the outlines of the Latin Catholic mass (with movements titled Kyrie, Gloria etc.), but containing a narrative based on the theme of the birth of Jesus of Nazareth. Accordingly, the work draws on traditions of Central-European Christmas pastoral music, and dramatizes the nativity through characters representative of the Czech countryside. Its early performance history is little studied, but over time the composition has achieved an extraordinary popularity among Czechs at home and abroad, a veritable musical symbol of the Czech celebration of Christmas.

== Background ==
Ryba composed his most famous work in 1796, a year after he managed to resolve a dispute over his teaching methods with the priest Kašpar Zachar. He wrote the music to a Czech libretto of his own devising; it was his only "mass" composed to a Czech text, although several of his earlier pastoral masses included interpolations with Czech text. Ryba did not identify this mass in his list of compositions created from 1782 to 1798, mentioning rather only "seven pastoral masses, one of them in Czech." The autograph manuscript was lost; today only the title page is preserved intact. Some parts of the composition were performed separately as pastorales (pastorellas) and the text gradually adapted with changes in Czech. Although Ryba created more than 1,000 compositions, his Czech Christmas Mass remains one of the few works by him performed regularly to date.

The music of Ryba's mass along with paintings by Josef Lada appear in a 2007 animated film called Česká mše vánoční (Czech Christmas Mass).

== Structure ==
The original key of the composition was A major, however, it was later transposed and arranged in various ways. Today the transposition in G major (a tone lower) is the most commonly used version. The main form of the composition is called ordinarium and consists of six parts. The mass contains characteristic short melodic motifs inspired by the folk music, supported by colorful rhythms. It is often considered a Christmas cantata, based on pastoral motifs. Because of its folk character and simplicity, it has been excluded from the Catholic liturgy. However, it still remains connected with the celebration of traditional Czech Christmas.

According to Czech mezzo-soprano Magdalena Kožená, it was widely performed in local churches on Christmas Eve when she was young.

The mass consists of nine parts:

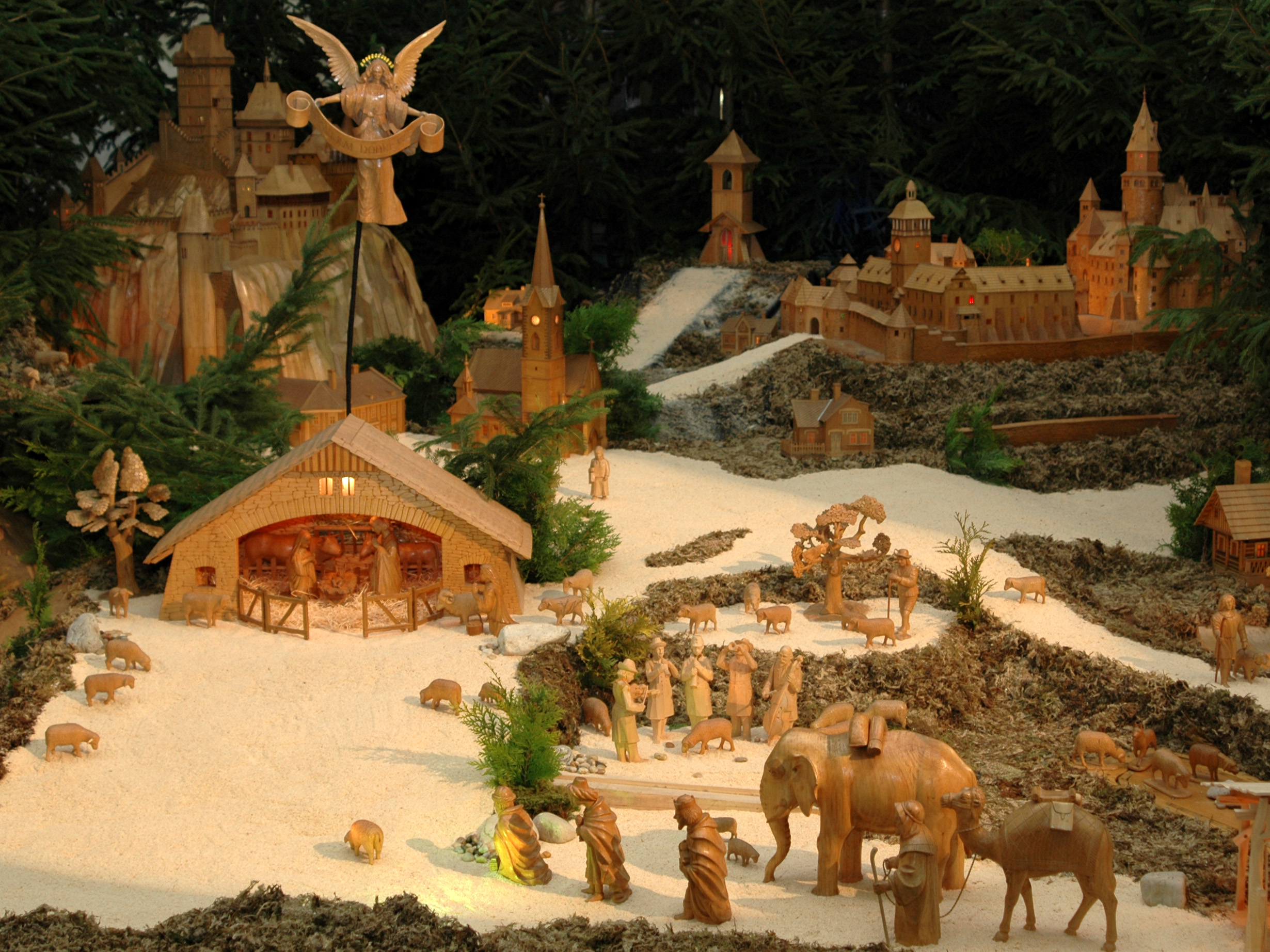
Ryba’s work suggests the picture of a Czech Bethlehem, such as the wooden nativity scene called Mohelnice Bethlehem.

1. Kyrie (full text) – The opening part begins with a well known verse "Hej, mistře, vstaň bystře!" ("Hey Master, get up quickly!"). A young shepherd wakes his master, they both wonder at various unusual phenomena of nature.
2. Gloria (full text) – a hymn to celebrate the birth of Christ
3. Graduale (full text) – Shepherds assemble the people from all the regions and lands. The part ends with an appeal: "K Betlému teď půjdeme, Boha slavit budeme." ("We're going to Bethlehem, to celebrate the God.")
4. Credo (full text) – In the Czech Christmas Mass, Credo describes the preparations for the pilgrimage to Bethlehem.
5. Offertorium (full text) – the gathering over the manger; People offer musical gifts to God and Christ.
6. Sanctus (full text) – the shortest part of the composition, an angelic hymn
7. Benedictus (full text) – This part with a solo soprano in the central role is dedicated to the celebration of the newborn Redeemer.
8. Agnus (full text) – parting with Christ, plea for protection of all people
9. Communio (full text) – The final part ends with a monumental choral hymn celebrating the Holy Trinity.

The original instrumentation of the work was 4 soli, choir, organ, flute, 2 clarinets, 2 horns, clarion (klarina; trumpet), 2 violins, viola, violon-double bass and timpani.

== Published scores ==
- Ryba, Jakub Jan: Česká mše vánoční (Böhmische Hirtenmesse, Czech Christmas Mass) – piano reduction. Prague, Editio Bärenreiter, 2004. M-2601-0325-2.

== Recordings ==
- Jakub Jan Ryba: Czech Christmas Mass; 3 Pastorellas – Magdalena Kožená, Robert Hugo, Capella Regia Musicalis; Deutsche Grammophon Archiv 4778365 (2009).
- Jakub Jan Ryba: Czech Christmas Mass (Česká mše vánoční) – Jaroslava Vymazalová, Marie Mrázová, Beno Blachut, Zdeněk Kroupa, Václav Smetáček conducting the Prague Symphony Orchestra, Josef Veselka and the Czech Philharmonic Chorus; Supraphon SU 3649 (1966).
