= Jakub Jan Ryba =

Czech teacher and composer

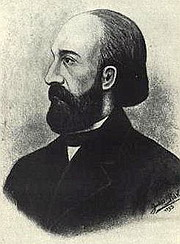
Jakub Jan Ryba

Jakub Šimon Jan Ryba (surname also Poisson, Pesce, Ryballandini, Rybaville; 26 October 1765 – 8 April 1815) was a Czech teacher and composer of classical music. His most famous work is the Czech Christmas Mass ("Hey, Master!"; Česká mše vánoční, "Hej mistře!").

== Life ==
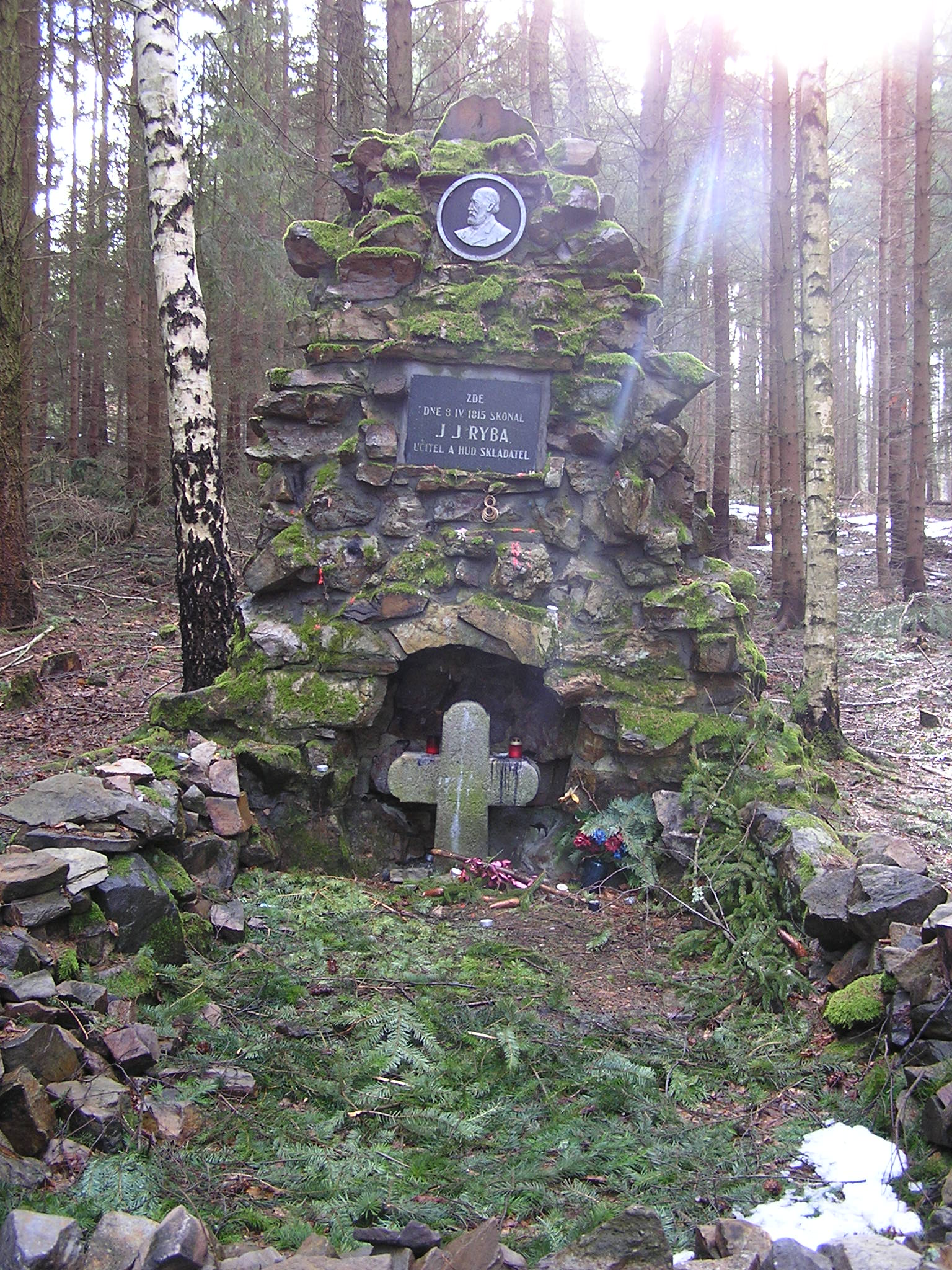
J. J. Ryba's monument near Voltuš

Ryba was born on 26 October 1765 in Přeštice near Plzeň. His father was a schoolteacher, which was a very poorly paid occupation at the time. In 1780 Ryba went to Prague, where he studied at the Piarist gymnasium. His teacher Cassianus Hanel taught him music. Ryba was a very good student and he soon started to compose. He dreamt of being a famous composer. In 1784 his father ordered him to work as a teacher in Nepomuk. Ryba reluctantly obeyed, but he was soon fired. After wandering for a few months, he received a message that his mother had died. After a long illness, he moved to Mníšek pod Brdy. Being popular among local inhabitants for performing music, he was quite happy there, but after some hesitation he accepted a schoolteacher position in Rožmitál pod Třemšínem.

The school prospered under his supervision, but he had constant conflicts with the local pastor and council. His frequent requests for funds for repairs of the school building were usually rejected. In 1796, he wrote his most famous work, Czech Christmas Mass "Hey, Master!" (named by him as Missa solemnis Festis Nativitatis D. J. Ch. accommodata in linguam bohemicum musicam), also as a consequence of a reconciliation with the local pastor. This work continues to be frequently performed at Christmas time in Bohemia.

An insufferable lack of money, the hostility of his superiors and total exhaustion led him to commit suicide at Voltuš near Rožmitál pod Třemšínem. On 8 April 1815, Ryba attended morning mass. Later, he was found in a dense forest with his throat cut with a razor. He had Essay on Peace of Soul by Seneca the Younger, his favourite author, with him. He was buried at a plague cemetery near Rožmitál pod Tremšínem.

His works mainly include many pastorellas and masses, but few compositions beyond the Czech Christmas Mass are performed regularly today.

== Literature ==
- Jiří Berkovec: Jakub Jan Ryba, Prague, 1995, ISBN 80-85787-97-0
- Václav Spěváček: Jakub Jan Ryba, vychovatel našeho lidu [Jan Jakub Ryba, Educator of Our Nation], Prague, 1984
- Jan Němeček: Jakub Jan Ryba: život a dílo [Jan Jakub Ryba, Life and Works], Prague, 1963
- Jan Němeček: Školní deníky Jakuba Jana Ryby [School Diaries by Jakub Jan Ryba], Prague, 1957
- Irena Janáčková: Jakub Jan Ryba o svém hudebním životě [Jakub Jan Ryba About His Life With Music], Prague, 1946. Translation of autobiography Mein musikalischer Lebenslauf (in German) from 1801.
