= David Erler =

German countertenor

- Born: 1981 (age 44–45); Auerbach, Saxony, Germany
- Education: Musikhochschule Leipzig
- Occupations: Countertenor; music editor
- Organization: Breitkopf & Härtel
- Website: daviderler.de

David Erler (born 1981) is a German countertenor, a male classical singer in the alto vocal range, specialising in Baroque music in historically informed performance. He is also a music editor for Breitkopf & Härtel.

== Career ==
Erler was born in Auerbach (Vogtland). He attended the musical gymnasium Clara-Wieck-Gymnasium in Zwickau, and studied at the Musikhochschule Leipzig with Maria Jonas and mainly Marek Rzepka, on a scholarship of the Hanns Seidel Foundation, graduating in 2006. He took masterclasses with Andreas Scholl, Marius van Altena and The King’s Singers.

In the field of historically informed performance, Erler has collaborated as a soloist with conductors such as Manfred Cordes, Laurence Cummings, Philippe Herreweghe, Peter Van Heyghen, Jos van Immerseel, Wolfgang Katschner, Rudolf Lutz, Hermann Max, Gregor Meyer, Peter Neumann, Hans-Christoph Rademann, Ludger Rémy, Gotthold Schwarz, Jos van Veldhoven, Adam Viktora and Roland Wilson. He has appeared as a guest singer with vocal ensembles amarcord, Calmus Ensemble, Singer Pur, Singphoniker and Stimmwerck.

He recorded his first solo album in 2020, choosing rarely performed sacred music composed in Germany in the late 17th century, with L'arpa festante and Rien Voskuilen. A reviewer summarised: "His singing and the way he treats the text do full justice to what this music is about, both musically and spiritually."

He is the chief editor of Johann Kuhnau's complete vocal works with Breitkopf & Härtel. He also published Jan Dismas Zelenka's Requiem (ZWV 46) with the same publishing company.
