= Capella Regia =

Czech early music ensemble

Capella Regia Prague, formerly Capella Regia Musicalis, is a Czech early music ensemble founded in 1992 by Robert Hugo. The name Capella Regia Musicalis was in reference to a famous 1693 Czech collection of sacred music by Václav Karel Holan Rovenský.
