= Václav Karel Holan Rovenský =

Václav Karel Holan Rovenský (1644 – 27 February 1718) was a Czech baroque composer and organist.

== Life and work ==
Holan Rovenský was born in 1644 in Rovensko pod Troskami. He had been organist in Turnov and Rovensko pod Troskami (where he was also cantor) from 1668 and in Dobrovice in 1679–1680. During his tenure at Vyšehrad he may have taken a pilgrimage to Rome and sometime in the early eighteenth century he lived a prayerful and hermit-like existence at Waldstein Castle near Turnov.

His magnum opus is Cappella Regia Musicalis (Prague, 1693), containing 772 pieces, which was almost certainly the fruit of his 12-plus years as a provincial cantor. The publication coincides with his appointment as organist at Vyšehrad in Prague, though he may have been in the city for some time before that. Cappella Regia Musicalis is a massive collection of hymns, sacred and festive songs, and all manner of musical settings of almost all central parts of the Roman Catholic liturgy, all printed primarily in Czech. It is difficult to tell just how much of the collection was composed by Holan himself (though it is clear that many other composers are represented), and some of the songs and other pieces are clearly much older, such as the anonymous fifteenth century Czech settings of the Passion. Curiously, the collection also contains many earlier Protestant and even Hussite songs, making it something of a survey of Czech sacred song to date. Unlike most other Czech hymnals, many pieces in Holan's collection also included basso continuo and even obbligato instruments such as violins, viols, and trumpets. Another curious feature of this rather amazing publication is that no two surviving copies are alike, leading to suspicions that they may have been made-to-order. It would seem that Johann Heinrich Schmelzer was familiar with it, since a (greatly expanded) German-language version of one of the pieces circulated under his name. Sections of Cappella Regia Musicalis were continually copied and reprinted throughout the ensuing centuries and, in some quarters, have been the basis for many Czech hymnals.

Holan Rovenský died on 27 February 1718 in Rovensko pod Troskami.

== Links ==
- Werke von und über Václav Karel Holan Rovenský in the German National Library catalogue
