= List of compositions by Jan Dismas Zelenka =

This list of compositions by Jan Dismas Zelenka was indexed in accordance with Wolfgang Reiche's thematic catalogue "Jan Dismas Zelenka: Thematisch-systematisches Verzeichnis der musikalischen Werke (ZWV)", Dresden, 1985. It includes vocal-instrumental (masses, requiems, oratoria, psalms, hymns, litanies, operatic works, melodrama, processionals, antiphons, arias, motets, short liturgical and spiritual compositions), instrumental and orchestral works (sonatas, sinfonias, concertos, etc.).

== Confirmed works ==
ZWV	Title	Key	Year	Notes
1	Missa Sanctae Caeciliae	G	c. 1711	
2	Missa Judica me	F	1714	
3	Missa Corporis Domini	C	c. 1719	
4	Missa Sancti Spiritus	D	1723	
5	Missa Spei	C	1724	missing
6	Missa Fidei	C	1725	
7	Missa Paschalis	D	1726	
8	Missa Nativitatis Domini	D	1726	
9	Missa Corporis Domini	D	c. 1727	
10	Missa Charitatis	D	1727	
11	Missa Circumcisionis Dei Nostri Jesu Christi	D	1728	
12	Missa Divi Xaverii	D	1729	
13	Missa Gratias agimus tibi	D	1730	
14	Missa Sancti Josephi	D	c. 1731	
15	Missa Eucharistica	D	1733	
16	Missa Purificationis Beatae Virginis Mariae	D	1733	
17	Missa Sanctissimae Trinitatis	a	1736	
18	Missa Votiva	e	1739	
19	Missa Dei Patris	C	1740	
20	Missa Dei Filii	C	c. 1740	
21	Missa Omnium Sanctorum	a	1741	
22	Missa Sancti Blasii	C	attributed, date unknown	
23	Missa	D	attributed, date unknown	
26	Kyrie, Sanctus, Agnus Dei	d	c. 1723	
27	Kyrie	a	1725	
28	Kyrie	d	date unknown	
29	Christe eleison	e	c. 1740	
30	Gloria	F	1724	
31	Credo	d	c. 1728	for Caldara's Missa Providentiae
32	Credo a due chori	F	c. 1724	
33	Credo	g	c. 1725	
34	Sanctus, Agnus	g	c. 1728	
35	Sanctus	a	1725	
36	Sanctus	d	c. 1728	
37	Agnus Dei	C	c. 1723	
38	Agnus Dei	G	1725	
39	Agnus Dei	g		
45	Requiem	c	date unknown	
46	Requiem	D	1733	
47	Invitatorium, Lectiones et Responsoria		1733	
48	Requiem	d	c. 1731	
49	Requiem	F	pre-1730	
50	De Profundis	d	1724	
53	Lamentationes pro hebdomada (6 pieces)	c, F, B, g, A, F	1722	
54	Lamentationes pro hebdomada (3 pieces)	B, F, F	1723	
55	Responsoria pro hebdomada sancta (27 pieces)		c. 1723	
56	Miserere	d	1722	
57	Miserere	c	1738	
58	Immisit Dominus pestilentiam		1709	
59	Attendite et videte		1712	
60	Deus Dux fortissime		1716	
61	Il Serpente di Bronzo (oratorio)		1730	
62	Gesù al Calvario (oratorio)		1735	
63	I penitenti al Sepolchro del Redentore (oratorio)		1736	
66	Dixit Dominus (Psalm 110)	a	c. 1725	SATB, soli & ch.; 2Ob.; 2Vn.; 2Va.; B.c.
67	Dixit Dominus	C	c. 1728	SATB, soli & ch.; 2Ob.; 2Vn.; Va.; B.c.
68	Dixit Dominus	D	1726	SATB, soli & ch.; 2Tpt.; Timp.; 2Ob.; 2Vn.; 2Va.; B.c.
69	Dixit Dominus	F	c. 1728	missing
70	Confitebor tibi Domine	a	c. 1728	SATB, soli & ch.; 2Ob.; 2Vn.; Va.; B.c.
71	Confitebor tibi Domine	c	1729	B, solo; 2Ob.; 2Vn.; Va.; Org.
72	Confitebor tibi Domine	e	1725	SATB, soli & ch.; 2Ob.; 2Vn.; 2Va.; B.c.
73	Confitebor tibi Domine	e	c. 1728	SATB, soli & ch.; 2Ob.; 2Vn.; Va.; B.c.
74	Confitebor tibi Domine	G	c. 1726	missing
75	Beatus vir	a	1725	A, solo; SATB, ch.; 2Ob.; 2Vn.; 2Va.; B.c.
76	Beatus vir	C	1726	SATB, soli & ch.; 2Ob.; 2Vn.; 2Va.; B.c.
77	Beatus vir	d		missing
78	Laudate pueri	A	c. 1726	missing
79	Laudate pueri	a	c. 1728	missing
80	Laudate pueri	a		missing
81	Laudate pueri	D	c. 1729	
82	Laudate pueri	F	c. 1725	
83	In exitu Israel	d	c. 1725	
84	In exitu Israel	g	c. 1728	
85	Credidi	a	c. 1728	
86	Laudate Dominum	F		missing
87	Laudate Dominum	F	c. 1728	
88	Laetatus sum	D	c. 1726	
89	Laetatus sum	D		missing
90	Laetatus sum	A	c. 1730	missing
91	In convertendo	g	c. 1728	
92	Nisi Dominus	a	c. 1726	
93	Nisi Dominus	a		missing
94	Beati omnes	g	c. 1728	
95	De profundis	a	1728	
96	De profundis	c	c. 1727	
97	De profundis	d	c. 1724	
98	Memento Domine David	E	c. 1728	
99	Ecce nunc benedicite	a	c. 1739	
100	Confitibor tibi Domine	B	c. 1728	
101	Domine probasti me	F	c. 1728	
102	Lauda Jerusalem	a	c. 1728	
103	Lauda Jerusalem	d	c. 1728	missing
104	Lauda Jerusalem	F	c. 1727	
106	Magnificat	a		missing
107	Magnificat	C	c. 1727	
108	Magnificat	D	1725	
110	Ave maris stella	d	c. 1726	
111	Creator alme siderum	d	1725	
112	Crudelis Herodes	g	1732	
113	Deus tuorum militum	C	c. 1729	
114	Exesultet orbis gaudiis	D	c. 1730	
115	Jam sol recessit	d	c. 1726	
116	Jesu corona virginum	d	c. 1729	
117	Iste confessor	a	c. 1729	
118	Ut queant laxis	a	c. 1726	
119	Veni Creator Spritus	a	c. 1726	
120	Veni Creator Spritus	C	c. 1729	
123	Alma Redemptoris Mater	A	c. 1727	
124	Alma Redemptoris Mater	a	c. 1725	
125	Alma Redemptoris Mater	a	c. 1729	
126	Alma Redemptoris Mater	D	c. 1730	
127	Alma Redemptoris Mater	d	c. 1728	
128	Ave Regina coelorum (6 pieces)	a, d, C, g, G, a	1737	
129	Regina coeli (3 pieces)	C, a, C	post-1728	
130	Regina coeli	A	1729	
131	Regina coeli	A		missing
132	Regina coeli	C		missing
133	Regina coeli	D	c. 1731	incomplete sketch
134	Regina coeli	F	c. 1726	
135	Salve Regina	a	1730	
136	Salve Regina	a	c. 1727	
137	Salve Regina	a		
138	Salve Regina (2 pieces)	C, D		missing
139	Salve Regina	d	1724	
140	Salve Regina	g	c. 1725	
141	Salve Regina	g		
145	Te Deum	D	c. 1724	
146	Te Deum	D	1731	
147	Litaniae de Venerabili Sacramento	C	1727	
148	Litaniae de Venerabili Sacramento	D	1729	
149	Litaniae Lauretanae	C	1718	
150	Litaniae Lauretanae	G	1725	
151	Litaniae Lauretanae 'Consolatrix afflictorum'	G	1744	
152	Litaniae Lauretanae 'Salus infirmorum'	F	1744	
153	Litaniae Omnium Sanctorum	a	c. 1735	
154	Litaniae Xaverianae	D	1723	
155	Litaniae Xaverianae	c	1727	
156	Litaniae de Sancto Xaverio	F	1729	
157	Sub tuum praesidium (10 pieces)	g, c, d, d, e, F, g, G, d, g	1734	
158	Statio quadruplex pro Processione Theophorica	B	pre-1710	
159	Pange lingua 'pro stationibus Theophoriae'	c		missing parts
161	Angelus Domini descendit (Offertorium)	A	1723	
162	O sponsa amata; Sion salvatorum (2 arias)	D, G	attributed	
163	Asperges me (4 pieces)	F, F, G, G	c. 1724	
164	Barbara dira effera (motet)	F	c. 1733	
165	Chvalte Boha silného (motet)	G		
166	Currite ad aras (Offertorium)	C	1716	
167	Da pacem Domine	B	c. 1740	
168	Gaude laetare (Motet)	A	1731	
169	Haec dies (Hymn)	C	1730	
170	Haec dies (Hymn)	F	c. 1726	
171	O magnum mysterium (Motet)	e	1723	
172	Pro, quos criminis (Hymn)	F	1723	
175	Sub olea pacis: Melodrama de Sancto Wenceslao		1723	
176	Italian Arias			
177	Il Diamante (Serenata)		1737	
178	Crab canons 'Emit amor' (2 pieces)	C	c. 1723	
179	Cantilena circularis 'Vide Domine'	C	1722	
181	Trio or Quartet Sonatas (6 pieces)	F, g, B, g, F, c	c. 1721	
182	Capriccio	D	c. 1717	
183	Capriccio	G	1718	
184	Capriccio	F	c. 1718	
185	Capriccio	A	1718	
186	Concerto à 8 Concertanti	G	1723	
187	Hipocondrie à 7 Concertanti	A	1723	
188	Overture à 7 Concertanti	F	1723	
189	Simphonie à 8 Concertanti	a	1723	
190	Capriccio	G	1729	
191	Canons on the Hexachord (9 pieces)		c. 1721	
203	Lamentationes Ieremiae Prophetae			

== Selection of lost or doubtful works ==
- ZWV 200: Missa, (C)
- ZWV 201: Credo, (D)
- ZWV 202: Sanctus, Agnus, (G), c. 1725
- ZWV 204: Salve Regina, (a), c. 1719
- ZWV 205: Salve Regina, (F)
- ZWV 206: Benedictus Dominus, (g), c. 1723
- ZWV 207: Benedictus sit Deus Pater, (D), c. 1729
- ZWV 208: Graduale Propter veritatem, (F)
- ZWV 209: Sollicitus fossor, (Motet; D), c. 1730
- ZWV 210: Veni Sancte Spiritus, (D), c. 1739
- ZWV 211: Qui nihil sortis felicitis, (Motet; B), 1730
- ZWV 212: Trumpet Fanfares, (6 pieces), c. 1722
- ZWV 213: Mass, (D)
- ZWV 214: Mass, (D)
- ZWV 215: Mass, (g)
- ZWV 216: Credo, (D)
- ZWV 217: Salve Regina duplex, (F)
- ZWV 218: Salve Regina
- ZWV 219: Salve Regina
- ZWV 220: Cantiones sacrae, (18) (Giovanni Palestrina ?), 2nd Motet Book)
- ZWV 221: O sing unto the Lord, (Anthem) (19th century transcription)
- ZWV 230: Agnus Dei, (a) (listed in inventarium)
- ZWV 231: Aria animae poenitentis, (c) (listed in inventarium)
- ZWV 232: Ave Regina, (a) (listed in inventarium)
- ZWV 233: Eja triumphos pangite, (Offertorium; C), pre-1715 ?
- ZWV 234: Gaudia mille, (Motet; C) (listed in inventarium)
- ZWV 236: Iste Confessore, (Hymn; C) (listed in inventarium)
- ZWV 240: Missa Sanctae Conservationis (lost)
- ZWV 241: Missa Theophorica a 2 Cori (listed in inventarium)
- ZWV 242: Missa tranquilli animi
- ZWV 243: Quid statis. De Beata Virgine Maria (listed in inventarium)
- ZWV 244: Tantum ergo, (c)
- ZWV 245: Via laureata, (school drama), 1704 (lost)
- ZWV 247: Requiem, 1724?
- ZWV 248: Missa in honorem B. Alberti Magni, (D)
- ZWV 249: Missa, (D)
