= Boni Pueri =

Czech boys' choir

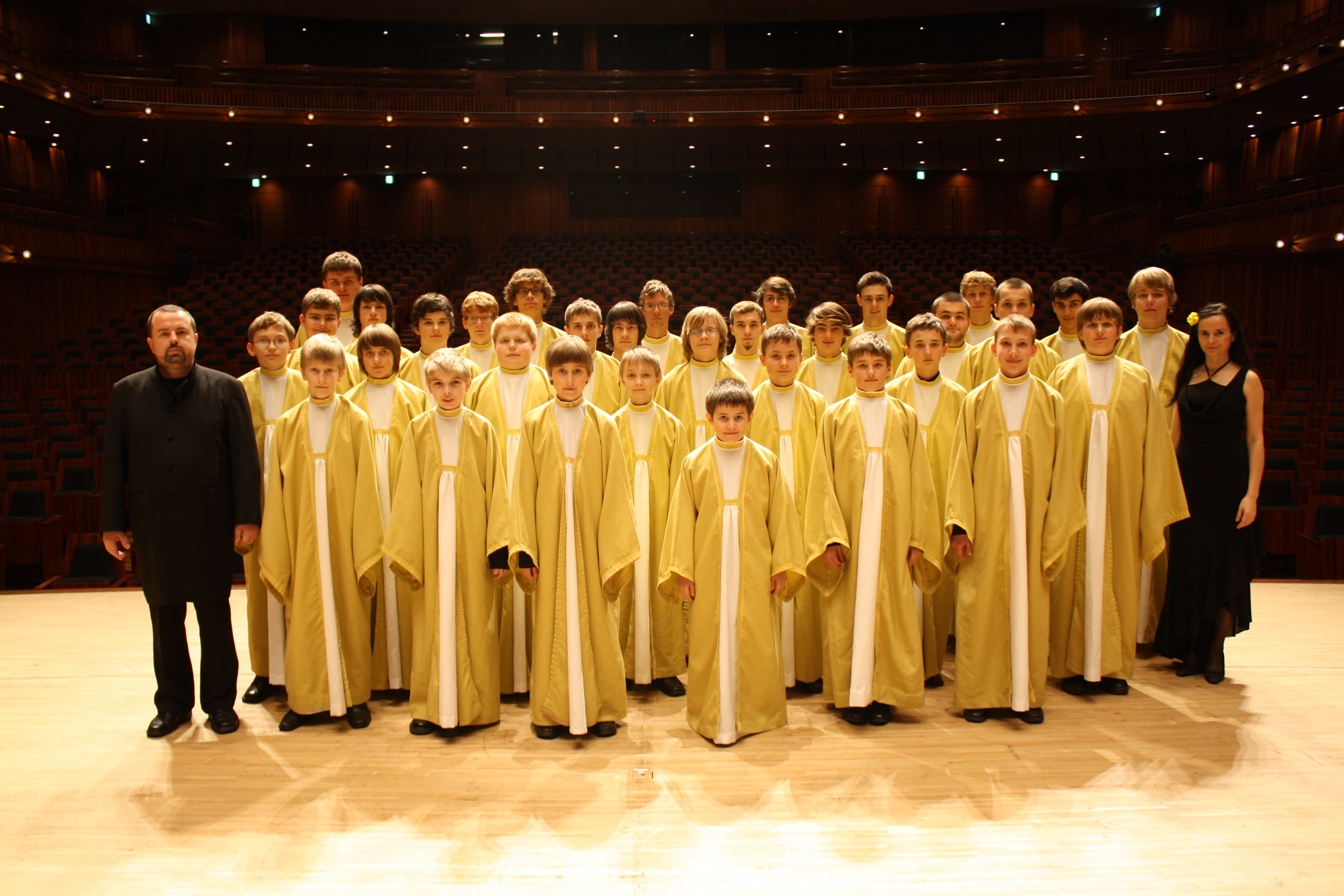
- Boni Pueri

Background information
- Origin: Hradec Králové, Czechoslovakia
- Years active: 1982–present
- Labels: Supraphon; EMI; BMG; ArcoDiva
- Website: bonipueri.cz

Boni Pueri is a Czech boys' choir founded in 1982, which has become one of Europe's most famous musical ensembles.

== Choir ==
The Czech boys' choir Boni Pueri ("Good Boys") has held more than 2,500 concerts in North America, Asia, and Europe, produced thirteen recordings, and been invited to participate in various other recordings with Supraphon, EMI, BMG, and ArcoDiva. In addition, Boni Pueri has been featured on a number of television and radio broadcasts. The choirs are invited to perform regularly with eminent artists, including José Carreras, and with other important ensembles and orchestras around the world.

Boni Pueri is also a private music school with 350 students and since 2006 has been under the patronage of the Czech Ministry of Education. They are a cultural ambassador of the "European Federation of Choirs of the Union".

== Concerts and tours ==
Boni Pueri has been privileged to perform in some of the world's great concert halls including Grace Cathedral in San Francisco, Winspear Centre in Edmonton, Alberta, Canada, the Tokyo Bunka Kaikan, Seoul Arts Centre, Concertgebouw in Amsterdam, De Doelen in Rotterdam, Basilica di S. Maria Maggiore in Bergamo, Italy, Meistersingerhalle in Nuremberg, and the Rudolfinum Dvořák Hall in Prague.

== Festivals ==
The choirs have appeared at numerous international music festivals including The Prague Spring Festival (1994, 1995, 1998, 2004, 2005), Europalia (Brussels 1998), AmericaFest International Festival for Boys' & Men's Choirs (Minneapolis 1998, 2002), and Jeonju International Sori Festival (South Korea 2002). In July 2004, Boni Pueri became the first European organization to host the highly acclaimed World Festival of Singing for Men and Boys and did so again in 2008. Individual members of Boni Pueri are often invited to be soloists in other performances, including The Magic Flute at the Teatro dell'Opera di Roma in 2004.

== Main projects ==
Boni Pueri performs frequently with the Czech Philharmonic Orchestra, including a notable performance of King Roger by Karol Szymanowski in 2007. In 2006, the choirs were invited to open the Orchestra's Choral Concert Series in Dvořák Hall.

Other important projects of recent years have included performances of Bach's St Matthew Passion, the Mozart Requiem, the Fauré Requiem, a theatrical staging of Hans Krása's Terezín children's opera Brundibár, and a premiere recording of music by the baroque composers Johann Caspar Ferdinand Fischer, Pavel Josef Vejvanovský, and Jan Dismas Zelenka. In 2003, Boni Pueri's recording of Zelenka's Sub olea pacis et palma virtutis received the prestigious Cannes Classical Award, and in 2004, their recording of Benjamin Britten's A Ceremony of Carols was named as the Recording of the Month.

== Selected collaborations ==
=== Singers ===
- Christina Johnston
- Edita Adlerová
- Lívia Ághová
- Gabriela Beňačková
- Lucie Bílá
- Markus Brutscher
- José Carreras
- Miroslav Dvorský
- Peter Dvorský
- Markus Forster
- Karel Gott
- Simona Houda-Šaturová
- Noémi Kiss
- Ivan Kusnjer
- Štefan Margita
- Bobby McFerrin
- Eva Urbanová
- Leo Marian Vodička

=== Orchestras and ensembles ===
- Czech Philharmonic Orchestra
- Czech National Symphony Orchestra
- Deutsches Symphonie-Orchester
- Munich Symphony Orchestra
- Musica Florea
- Prague Philharmonia
- Schola Gregoriana Pragensis
- Prague Radio Symphony Orchestra

=== Soloists and musicians ===
- Aleš Bárta – organ
- Jana Boušková – harp
- Václav Hudeček – violin
- Josef Suk – violin
- Pavel Šporcl – violin
- Jaroslav Tůma – organ, harpsichord

=== Conductors ===
- Petr Altrichter
- Vladimir Ashkenazy
- John Axelrod
- Douglas Bostock
- Charles Dutoit
- Jaroslav Krček
- Libor Pešek
- Leoš Svárovský
- Marek Štryncl
- Vladimír Válek

=== Actors ===
- Otakar Brousek Sr.
- Barbora Hrzánová
