= Il Diamante =

Il Diamante (The Diamond), ZWV 177, is a composition from 1737 by Czech baroque composer Jan Dismas Zelenka.

== History ==
The secular vocal piece was performed as a surprise gift from the Electress Maria Josepha for the wedding feast of the Schwabian baroness Joanna von Stein and the Polish magnate prince Jerzy Ignacy Lubomirski.

The libretto was discovered in 20th century. The title refers to the bride's name (Stein) and to the special jewelry given to her by the electress as a wedding gift. The composition was a great opportunity for Zelenka to excel as other Dresden operatic composers (Johann Adolf Hasse, Giovanni Alberto Ristori) were busy at that time. It is composed in Italian operatic style.

== Description ==
Terra offers Juno a gemstone as a guarantee of a marriage (Dresden). She asks Hymen and Cupid for a help, to bless the couple. After the final chorus, Venus' aria reminds us that only she can perfect fiancés' love.

== Parts ==
- Sinfonia (Allegro, adagio, Minuetto)
- Recitativo "Questa che il sol produce": Soprano, Terra
- Aria "Alla madre degli amori": Soprano, Terra
- Recitativo "Del gentile tuo dono": Soprano, Giunone
- Aria "Mira come sue candide piume": Soprano, Giunone
- Recitativo "Prima di scioglier il volo": Soprano+Alto+Soprano, Giunone, Imeneo, Amore
- Aria "Coronato di ghirlande": Alto, Imeneo
- Recitativo "Abitro del destino": Soprano, Amore
- Aria "Così per la foresta": Soprano, Amore
- Recitativo "Fido Imeneo, non più dimora": Soprano, Giunone
- Aria "Veder aspetta": Soprano, Giunone
- Recitativo "Gemma tal che in durezza": Alto+Soprano, Imeneo, Amore
- Aria "Di quegli occhi": Alto, Amore
- Recitativo "Tu che al mondo presiedi": Soprano, Terra
- Aria "Del volto della sposa": Soprano, Terra
- Coro "Godete che lice I"
- Recitativo "Dove amore si festeggia": Soprano, Venere
- Aria "Qui piegate": Soprano, Venere
- Coro "Godete che lice II"

== Recordings ==
- Adam Viktora, Prague Baroque Soloists & Ensemble Inégal. 2009.

== See also ==
- Sub olea pacis et palma virtutis
