= Missa Providentiae =

- Mass by Jan Dismas Zelenka
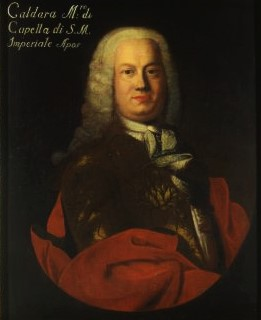
- Antonio Caldara, 18th-century portrait
- Catalogue: ZWV 1
- Text: Mass ordinary
- Language: Latin
- Performed: 22 November 1711
- Scoring: SATB soloists and choir; 2 oboes; bassoon; strings; continuo

Missa Providentiae is a Kyrie–Gloria Mass in D minor composed by Antonio Caldara, which around 1728 was expanded into a Missa tota by Jan Dismas Zelenka: this composer derived a Sanctus and Agnus Dei from Caldara's Kyrie and Gloria, and added a Credo, ZWV 31, of his own hand. Around 1738–1741, Johann Sebastian Bach made a copy of a Sanctus, BWV 239, which was based on the first section of the Gloria of Caldara's Kyrie–Gloria Mass.

The Mass is composed for soprano, alto, tenor and bass soloist singers, and a choir consisting of the four same voice types (SATB). The orchestra consists of strings (two violin parts and one viola part) and basso continuo, to which in some movements two oboes are added. The oboes are silent throughout Zelenka's Credo, and the BWV 239 Sanctus only requires a four-part choir, strings and continuo.

== Caldara's Kyrie and Gloria ==
The Kyrie of Caldara's Missa Providentiae, in D minor, consists of the usual three movements ("Kyrie", "Christe" and "Kyrie II"), in which the singers are only accompanied by strings and continuo. The Gloria is subdivided in 9 sections, in some of which the oboes join the rest of the orchestra.

== Zelenka's Missa tota ==
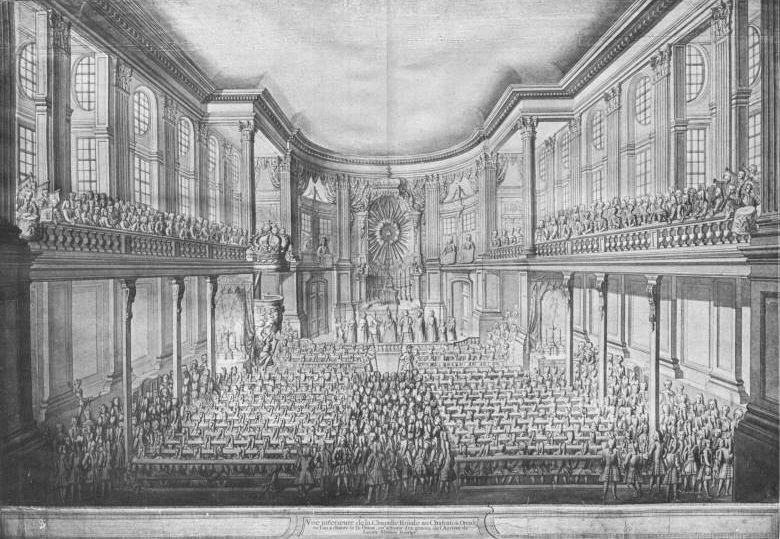
Interior of Dresden's Catholic Hofkirche (in the former Opernhaus am Taschenberg) in 1719.

Zelenka composed and acquired several Kyrie–Gloria Masses for the court at Dresden, where he was employed from the early 1710s. Dresden was the capital of the Electorate of Saxony: Saxony was dominantly Protestant, but the elector, Augustus the Strong, had converted to Catholicism in order to become eligible as king of Poland. Initially, Augustus's Catholicism was a private matter when in Saxony, with a court chapel within the palace building. In 1708, however, the former Opernhaus am Taschenberg, adjacent to the palace, opened as Hofkirche (court church), open to the general public. Kyrie–Gloria Masses were seen as a Protestant practice, and thus the musicians of the Dresden court started to transform these mass compositions into Missae totae.

Between 1725 and 1733 Caldara's Missa Providentiae was converted in such a Missa tota: Zelenka derived the music for the Sanctus and Agnus Dei of the Missa Providentiae from the Kyrie and Gloria composed by Caldara. Sanctus and Agnus Dei each have three sections. Further, around 1728, he added a Credo in four sections, ZWV 31, for SATB soloists and choir, strings and continuo.

== Sanctus in D minor, BWV 239 ==
Around 1738–1741 Bach made a fair copy of a Sanctus for SATB choir, strings and continuo. The Sanctus was adopted as Bach's in the 19th-century Bach-Gesellschaft-Ausgabe, and in the first edition of the Bach-Werke-Verzeichnis (1950), where it got 239 as BWV number. In the second half of the 20th century, its authenticity was doubted in several publications, e.g. in an article by Hans T. David, published in 1961. The 1998 edition of the Bach-Werke-Verzeichnis listed the composition as a doubtful work. In the 2010s the Bach Digital website described BWV 239 as a work derived from the first section of the Gloria of Caldara's Missa Providentiae.

=== Recordings ===
A recording of BWV 239 is for instance included in Apocryphal Bach Masses II, cpo 777561-2, by Wolfgang Helbich conducting the Alsfelder Vokalensemble (recorded 2009, released 2012). A 20th-century ADD recording is included in Bach: Missae Breves, Erato 4509-97236-2, by Michel Corboz conducting the Ensemble Vocal de Lausanne and Orchestre de Chambre de Lausanne. Both recordings take somewhat less than 2 minutes for the Sanctus.

== Sources ==
- Beißwenger, Kirsten (1991). "Bachs Eingriffe in Werke fremder Komponisten: Beobachtungen an den Notenhandschriften aus seiner Bibliothek unter besonderer Berücksichtigung der lateinischen Kirchenmusik" [Bach's editing of works by other composers: observations regarding the musical manuscripts from his library, with a particular focus on Latin church music]. In Schulze, Hans-Joachim; Wolff, Christoph (eds.). Bach-Jahrbuch 1991 [Bach Yearbook 1991]. Bach-Jahrbuch (in German). Vol. 77. Neue Bachgesellschaft. Berlin: Evangelische Verlagsanstalt. pp. 127–158. doi:10.13141/bjb.v1991. ISBN 3-374-01104-7. ISSN 0084-7682.
- David, Hans T. (1961). "A Lesser Secret of J. S. Bach Uncovered". Journal of the American Musicological Society. 14 (2). American Musicological Society. University of California Press: 199–223. doi:10.2307/829757. JSTOR 829757. Archived from the original on 2019-12-21.
- Ermisch, Hubert (1888). Das alte Archivgebäude am Taschenberge in Dresden: Ein Erinnerungsblatt (in German). Dresden: Baensch.
- Stockigt, Janice B. (2013). "Bach's Missa BWV 232^{I} in the context of Catholic Mass settings in Dresden, 1729–1733". In Tomita, Yo; Leaver, Robin A.; Smaczny, Jan (eds.). Exploring Bach's B-minor Mass. Cambridge University Press. pp. 39–53. ISBN 978-1-107-00790-1.
