= Ratměřice =

- Municipality
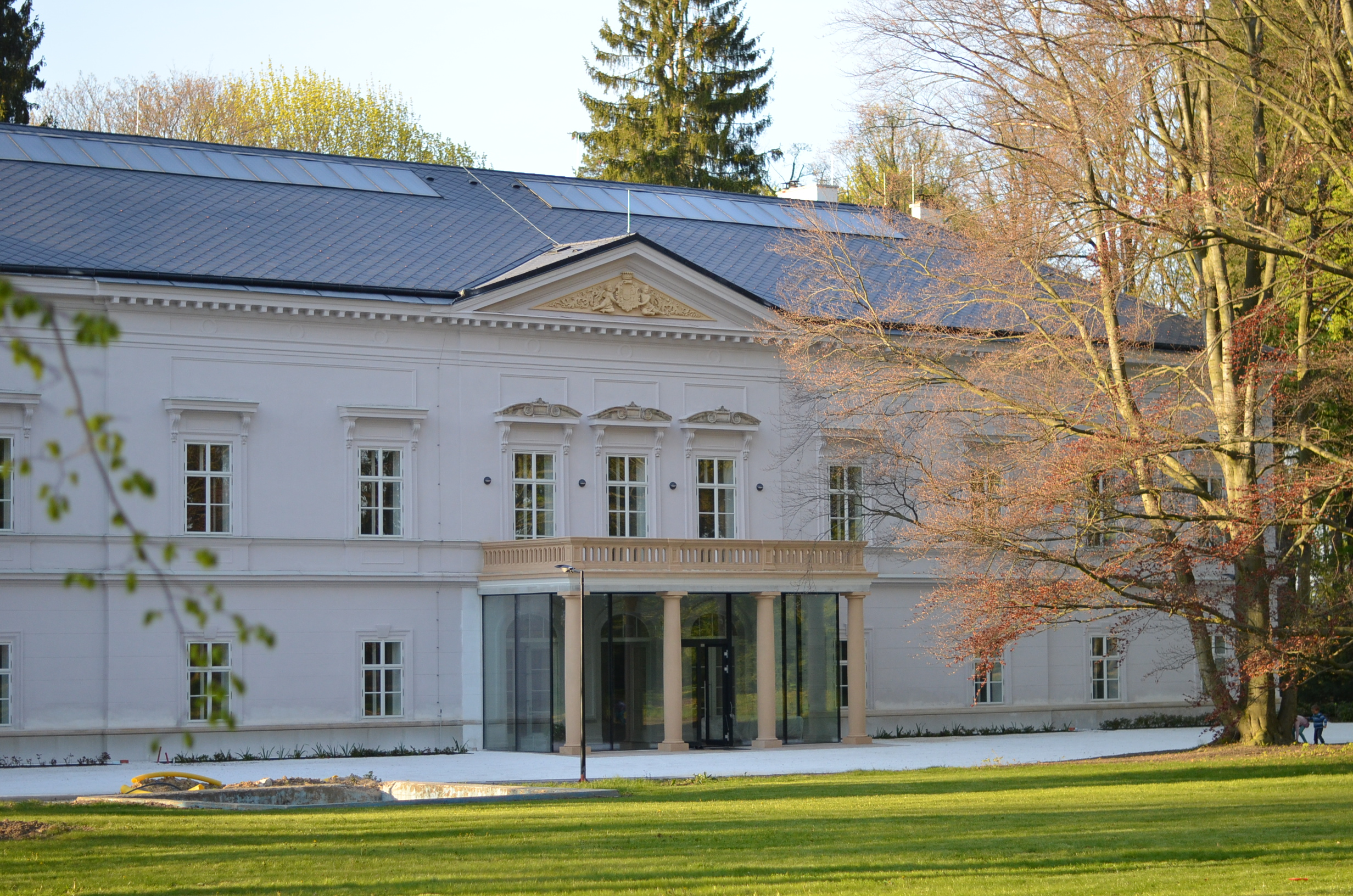
- Ratměřice Castle

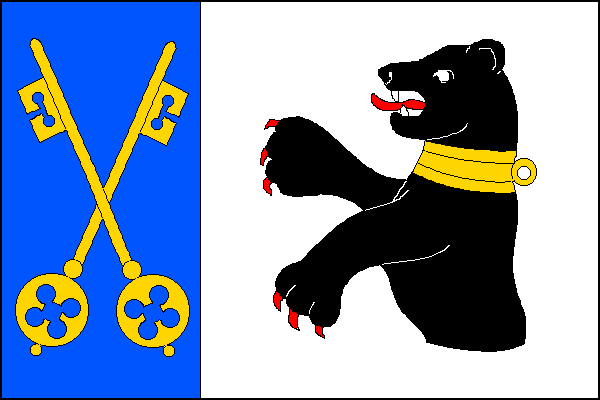
- Flag Coat of arms

- Location in the Czech Republic
- Coordinates: 49°38′36″N 14°45′22″E
- Country: Czech Republic
- Region: Central Bohemian
- District: Benešov
- First mentioned: 1220

Area
  - Total: 9.54 km^{2} (3.68 sq mi)
- Elevation: 498 m (1,634 ft)

Population (2026-01-01)
  - Total: 316
  - Density: 33.1/km^{2} (85.8/sq mi)
- Time zone: UTC+1 (CET)
  - Summer (DST): UTC+2 (CEST)
- Postal code: 257 03
- Website: www.ratmerice.cz

Ratměřice is a municipality and village in Benešov District in the Central Bohemian Region of the Czech Republic. It has about 300 inhabitants.

== Administrative division ==
Ratměřice consists of three municipal parts (in brackets population according to the 2021 census):

- Ratměřice (212)
- Hrzín (17)
- Skrýšov (32)

== Etymology ==
The initial name of Ratměřice was Ratmiřice. The name was derived from the personal name Ratmír, meaning "the village of Ratmír's people".

== Geography ==
Ratměřice is located about 16 kilometres (10 mi) south of Benešov and 46 km (29 mi) southeast of Prague. It lies in the Vlašim Uplands. The highest point is at 575 m (1,886 ft) above sea level.

== History ==
The first written mention of Ratměřice is from 1220. Hrzín and Skrýšov were first mentioned in 1318. In the 14th century, Ratměřice became property of the monastery in Louňovice pod Blaníkem. After the monastery was burned down in 1420 as a result of the Hussite Wars, Ratměřice was acquired by the town of Tábor. Tábor owned it until 1547, when properties of the town were confiscated. Ratměřice was subsequently purchased by Oldřich Skuhrovský of Skuhrov.

From 1622 to 1702, Ratměřice was property of the Talmberk family. In 1645, during the Battle of Jankau of the Thirty Years' War, the village was completely burned down, but was restored when the war ended. The Kořenský of Terešov family held the village from 1702 to 1719. They had built here a castle. Other notable owners of Ratměřice were the families of Sternthal (1751–1830) and Chotek (1830–1898).

== Demographics ==
Historical population

Year	Pop.	±%
1869	718	—
1880	689	−4.0%
1890	687	−0.3%
1900	665	−3.2%
1910	626	−5.9%

Year	Pop.	±%
1921	589	−5.9%
1930	503	−14.6%
1950	395	−21.5%
1961	366	−7.3%
1970	380	+3.8%

Year	Pop.	±%
1980	358	−5.8%
1991	322	−10.1%
2001	301	−6.5%
2011	266	−11.6%
2021	261	−1.9%

Source: Censuses

== Transport ==
There are no railways or major roads passing through the municipality.

== Sights ==
The main landmark is the Church of Saint Gall. Built in the Romanesque style, it was probably founded in the first third of the 13th century. It was modified in the Gothic style. In the 19th century, further modifications were made.

The Ratměřice Castle is a Baroque building from the early 18th century. In the late 19th century, it was rebuilt into its present Neo-Renaissance form. Today the castle is privately owned and serves as a hotel and a restaurant. The castle is surrounded by a park with rare trees. The largest two giant sequoias in the Czech Republic are located here.
