= Hofkirchen =

Hofkirchen is a German language place name, and may refer to:

- Hofkirchen, Bavaria, Germany
- in Austria:
  - Hofkirchen bei Hartberg, in Styria
  - Hofkirchen an der Trattnach, in Upper Austria
  - Hofkirchen im Mühlkreis, in Upper Austria
  - Hofkirchen im Traunkreis, in Upper Austria

== See also ==
- Hofkirche (disambiguation)
