= Pavel Horák =

Pavel Horák may refer to:

- Pavel Horák (choirmaster) (born 1967), Czech choirmaster
- Pavel Horák (handballer) (born 1982), Czech handball player
