= Blaník =

Mountain in the Czech Republic

Velký Blaník
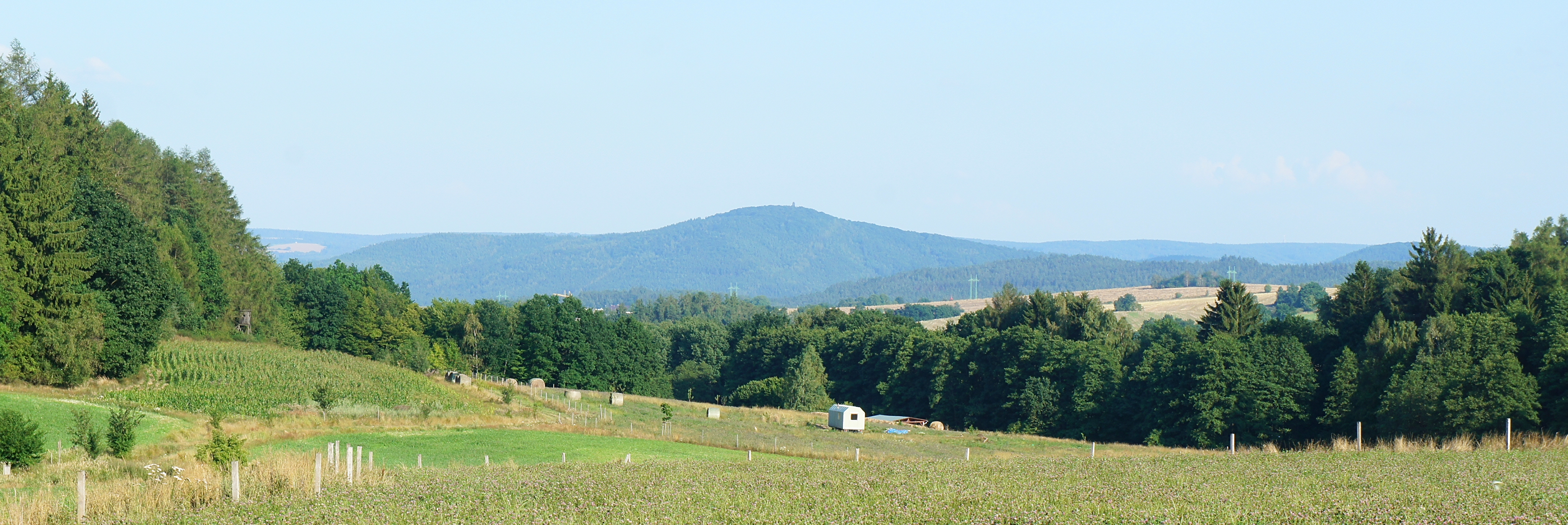

Highest point
- Elevation: 638 m (2,093 ft)
- Prominence: 155 m (509 ft)
- Isolation: 6.7 km (4.2 mi)
- Coordinates: 49°38′32″N 14°52′22″E

Geography
- Location: Louňovice pod Blaníkem, Czech Republic
- Parent range: Vlašim Uplands

Velký Blaník, commonly known as Blaník (Czech pronunciation: [blaɲiːk]) is a mountain in the Czech Republic near Louňovice pod Blaníkem. The mountain and surrounding area is a protected landscape area. The peak is at 638 metres (2,093 ft) above sea level. Next to Velký Blaník (lit. 'great Blaník') is a smaller hill called Malý Blaník ('small Blaník').

The mountain has played an important role in Czech national mythology since the Middle Ages (together with the mountains Říp and Radhošť); therefore, during the era of the Czech National Revival, a stone quarried from Blaník was symbolically placed in the foundations of the newly built National Theatre in Prague.

== Buildings ==
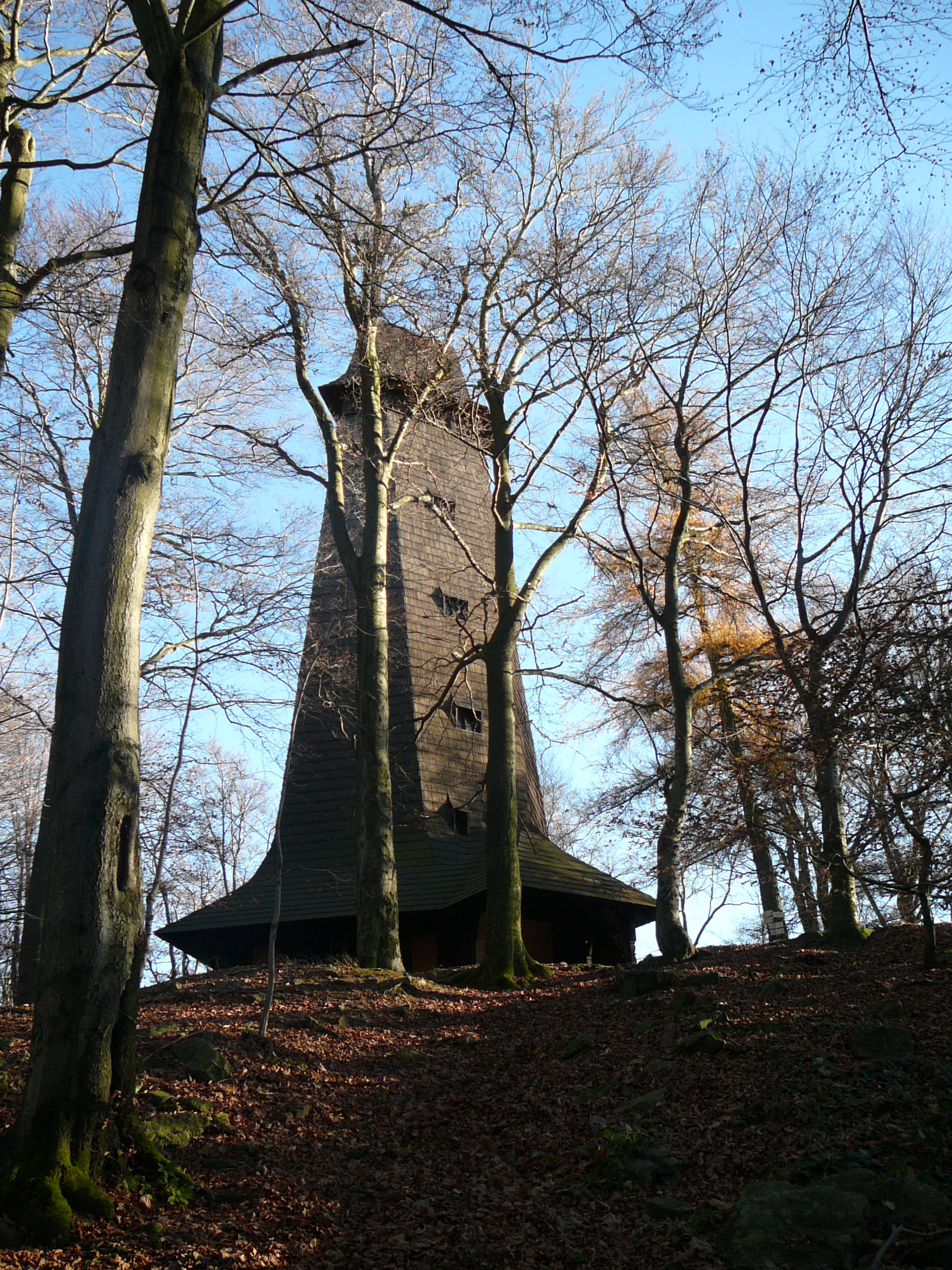
Blaník observation tower

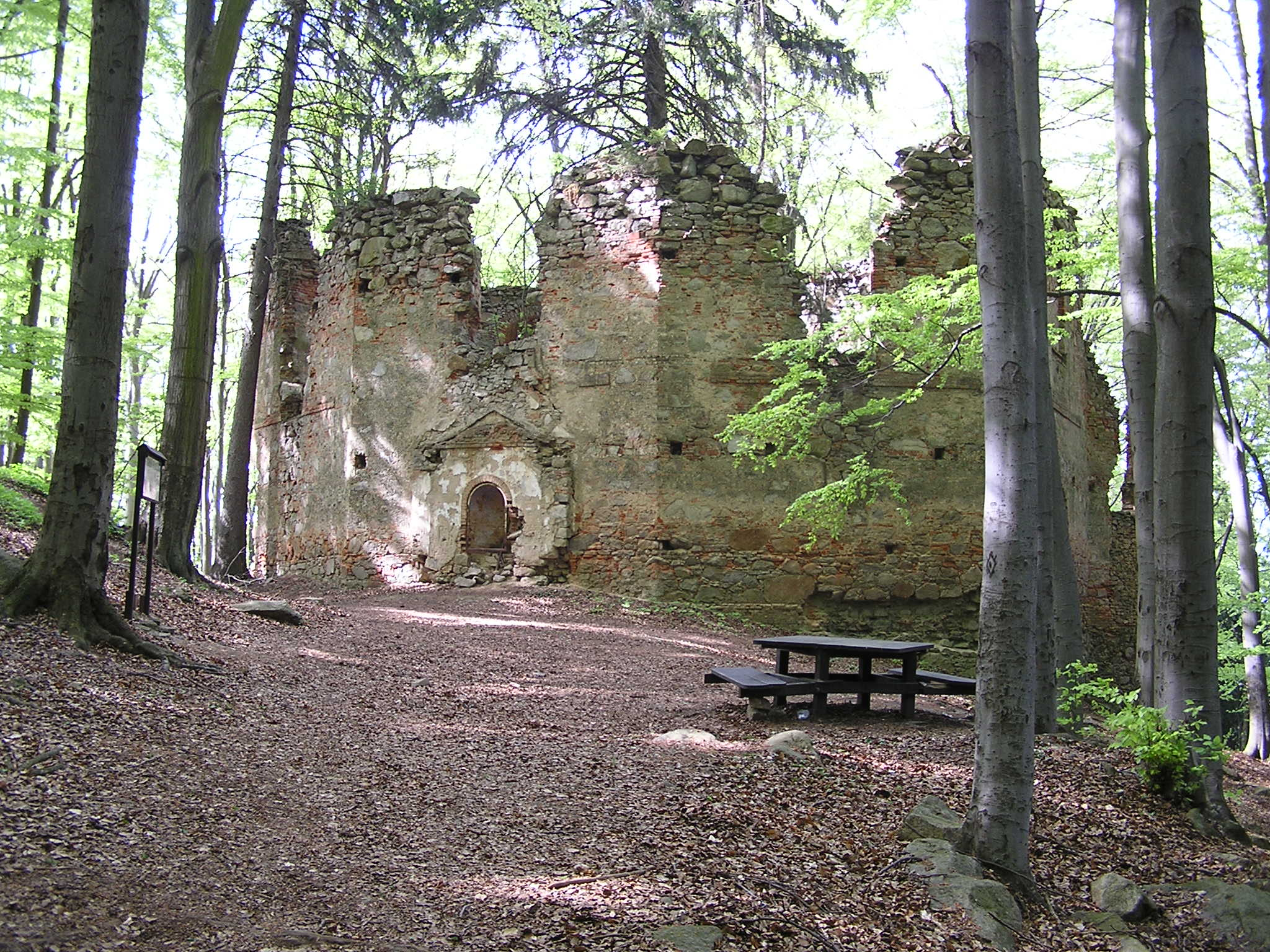
Ruins of the Chapel of St. Mary Magdalene

In the 5th century BC, during the Hallstatt period, a circular hillfort with two rows of massive stone walls was built at the top of Velký Blaník; its remnants are still visible around the summit. Later, a fortress and probably a wooden castle were built there.

At the top of Velký Blaník stands a 30 m tall wooden watchtower from 1941 in the shape of a Hussite tower.

=== Legend ===
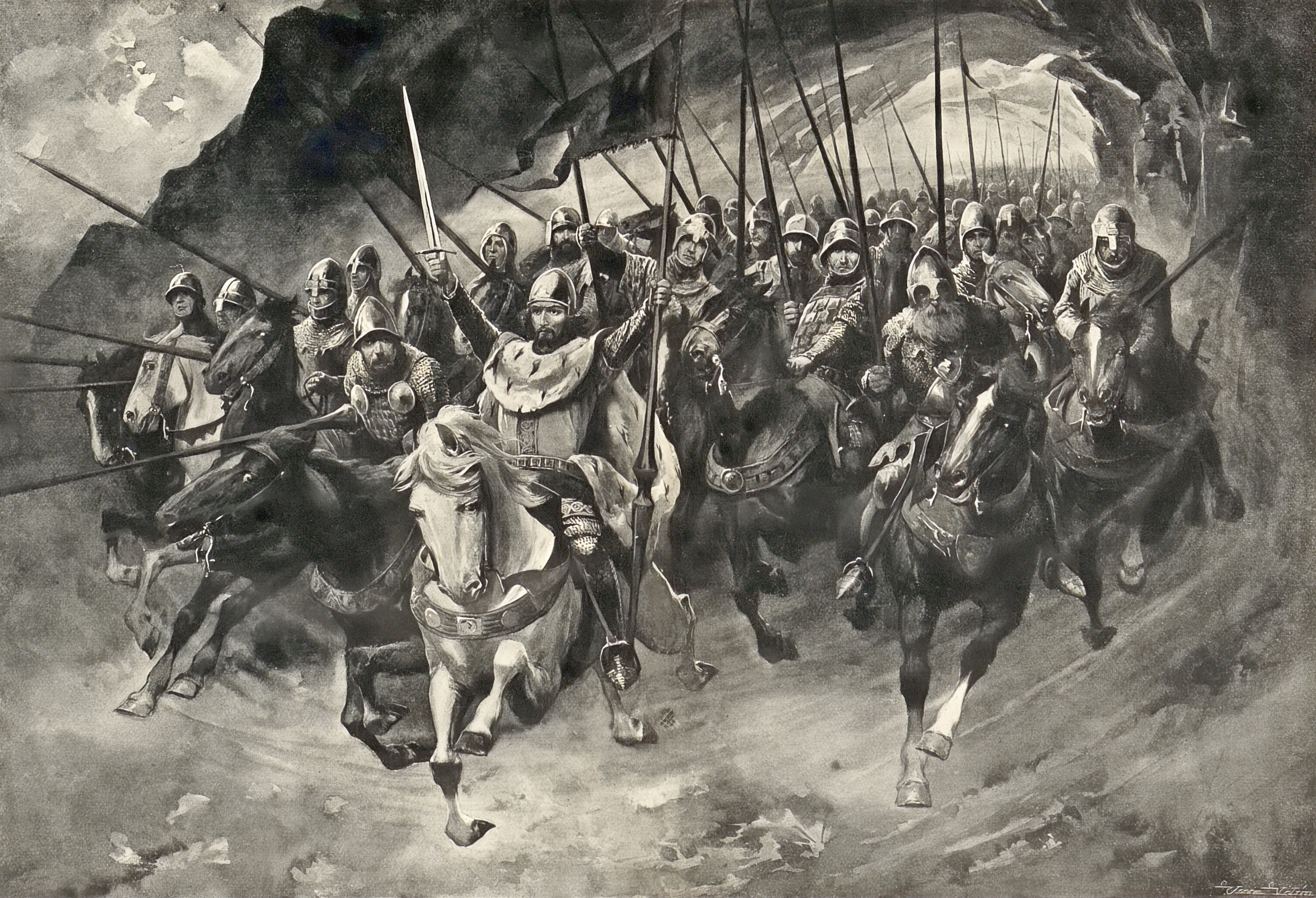
Blaník knights set off from the mountain to save Czech nation (Věnceslav Černý, 1898)

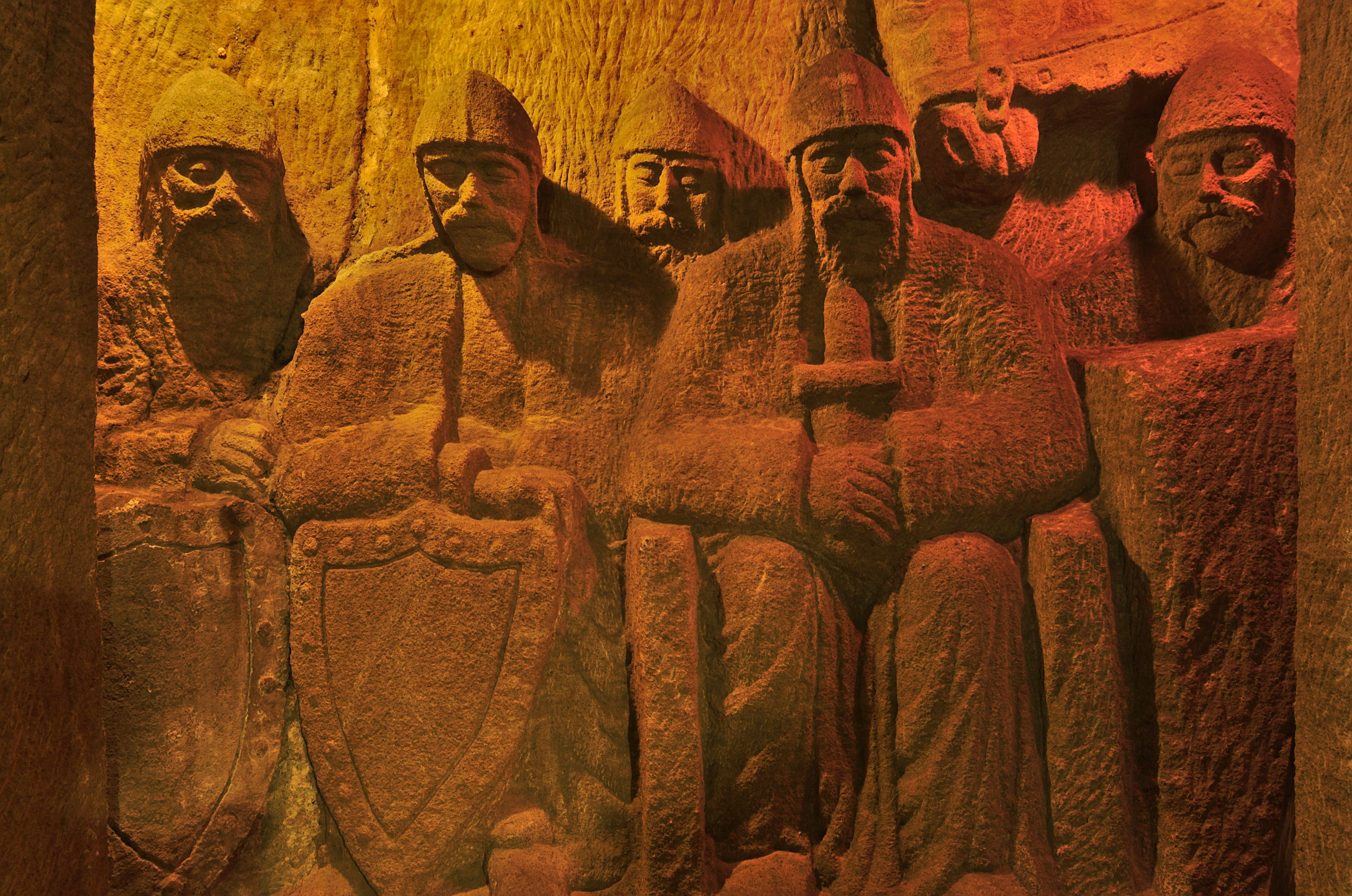
Sleeping Blaník knights. Sandstone figures carved (1928–1931) in a small man-made cave near village Rudka, southern Moravia, by local naive artist Stanislav Rolínek

One of the most popular national legends tells of an army sleeping in the mountain that comes out to help the Czech nation when it is at its worst. The basis of the legend probably arose in the 15th century, when a foreign army was overwhelmingly defeated at the foot of the mountain, near the village of Býkovice. According to the legend, its commander is the patron saint of the country Saint Wenceslaus. It is said that a rock shall open up in the mountain, the knights inside wake up from a deep sleep, and will set off against the enemies. They will defeat them, and peace and tranquility will come back to Bohemia. According to all versions of the legend, a day inside the mountain is as long as a year on the surface.

Since 1989, St. Wenceslaus Celebrations have been regularly held here. From the Velký Blaník Wenceslaus is accompanied by his soldiers and comes on a white horse to Louňovice pod Blaníkem square, where the celebrations are held.

At Rudka (a part of Kunštát) a sandstone man-made cave with carved figures of the Blaník knights is located. It is a popular touristic attraction.

== In popular culture ==
Czech historical novelist Alois Jirásek portrayed the Blaník legend in his Ancient Bohemian Legends.

The last movement of Smetana's symphonic poem Má vlast is called Blaník.

The Czechoslovak-built Let L-13 sailplane is called the Blaník after the mountain, and the Let L-23 is called the Super Blaník.

== See also ==
- King asleep in mountain
