= Missa Sanctissimae Trinitatis =

Mass by Jan Dismas Zelenka

- Mass by Jan Dismas Zelenka
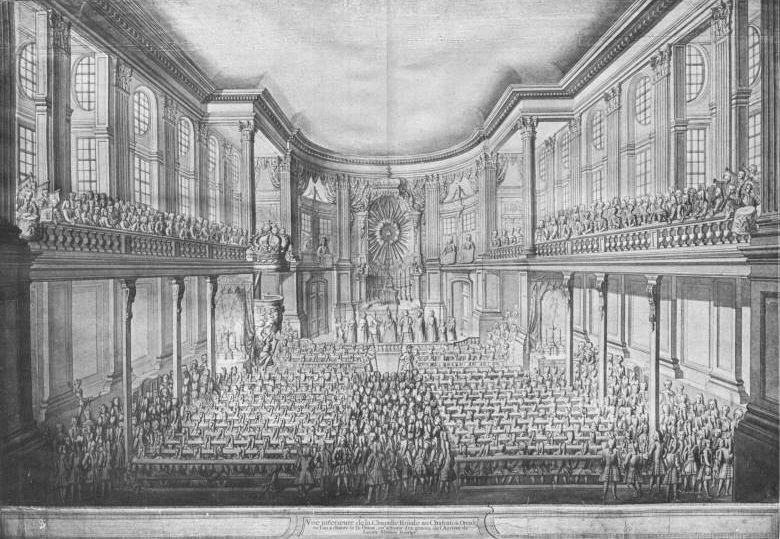
- The Court Chapel in Dresden, where the mass was first performed
- Key: A minor
- Catalogue: ZWV 17
- Text: Mass ordinary
- Language: Latin
- Composed: 1736
- Duration: 60 minutes

Missa Sanctissimae Trinitatis (Mass of the Most Holy Trinity) in A minor, ZWV 17, is a vocal-instrumental sacred work, written by Czech Baroque composer Jan Dismas Zelenka. It was completed in 1736 as the first of five high masses he wrote in the last ten years of his life.

== History ==
Zelenka composed the Missa Santissimae Trinitis for the court in Dresden in 1736. It is a composition of combined sacred style, which not only divides the liturgy text only according to the conventional Kyrie, Gloria, Credo, Sanctus and Agnus Dei, but also into shorter sections. In each of them the instrumental grouping, character and style differ. Old and modern techniques are joined, therefore, not only in the sense of changing the individual movements, but they also penetrate each other within. The complexity of the structure has been compared to works by J. S. Bach, Zelenka's contemporary.

The mass is divided into 19 individual section. The choruses reveal the strong influence of contemporary opera and concerto, and solo arias. The arias (in Part II, alto, in VI and XV, soprano) are much more extensive than other Zelenka's mass arias of the 1720s. They are introduced by virtuoso ritornellos. Orchestral parts are independent and rich with melodiously flowing solo voices. Similarly, the concertante choruses (Parts IV, IX and XI) are represented with modern ritornellos. The orchestra parts in these movements also are independent and often dominate over the simple homophonic chorus. The influence of the concerto structure is revealed in the contrast between solo vocal and choral parts. The opposite pole of the chorus concerto are the massive choral fugues - their dialogue here not only demonstrate the composer's technical mastery, but also illustrate the intellectual depth and significance of the work.

A critical edition of the mass was published by Breitkopf, giving the duration as 60 minutes.

== Orchestration ==
As with Zelenka's other High Mass compositions there are no brasses in the orchestration, which includes only organ, six violins, two viols, cello, double bass, two oboes, bassoon and archlute, expanded by two solo flutes and a chalumeau.

== Structure ==
- Kyrie
  - I Kyrie eleison I (coro)
  - II Christe eleison (aria, alto)
  - III Kyrie eleison II (coro – Fuga)
- Gloria
  - IV Gloria in excelsis Deo (coro e soli SATB)
  - V Qui tollis peccata mundi (coro)
  - VI Quoniam tu solus Sanctus (aria, soprano)
  - VII Cum sancto Spiritu I (coro)
  - VIII Cum sancto Spiritu II (coro – fuga)
- Credo
  - IX Credo in unum Deum (coro e soli SATB)
  - X Et incarnatus est (coro)
  - XI Et resurrexit (coro e solo tenor)
  - XII Et unam sanctam...Ecclesiam (soli - SAT)
  - XIII Et vitam venturi saeculi (coro – fuga)
- Sanctus
  - XIV Sanctus (coro)
  - XV Benedictus (aria, soprano)
  - XVI Osanna in excelsis (coro)
- Agnus Dei

XVII. Agnus Dei I (soli: tenor, bass) XVIII. Agnus Dei II (coro) XIX. Dona nobis pacem (coro – fuga)

== Recordings ==
- Missa Sanctissimae Trinitatis by Musica Florea, CD, Studio Matouš, 1994
- Missa Sanctissimae Trinitatis ZWV 17, Gaude laetare ZWV 168 by Ensemble Inégal, Prague Baroque Soloists (Adam Viktora), CD, Nibiru, 2012
