= Sub olea pacis et palma virtutis =

Opera by Jan Dismas Zelenka

Sub olea pacis et palma virtutis conspicua orbi regia Bohemiae Corona: Melodrama de Sancto Wenceslao (Under the Olive Tree of Peace and the Palm Tree of Virtue the Crown of Bohemia Splendidly Shines Before the Whole World: Melodrama to Saint Wenceslaus), ZWV 175, is an extensive composition, written in 1723 by Czech baroque composer Jan Dismas Zelenka.

== History ==
The opus was composed for the coronation of Charles VI in 1723. The work was commissioned in 1722 by Prague Jesuits who were involved in the grand preparation for the coronation act. The composer came to Prague in 1723 to complete, rehearse and perform his work. It was performed in the presence of the imperial couple at the Jesuit Clementinum in Prague in the afternoon of 12 September 1723, with Zelenka himself as conductor. Besides the eight soloists and musicians of the orchestra, a further 142 persons, including dancers and walk-on actors, were involved in that grandiose performance. Vocal soloists were selected from among native Czechs who attended Jesuit schools. This event was probably the social culmination of Zelenka's career, something he had not been able to achieve during his time in Dresden.

== Description ==
The composition is a monumental allegorical opus, its character between melodrama, oratorio, stage play and contemporary opera, celebrating the memory of the greatest Czech saint and patron of Bohemia, Saint Wenceslas, one of the founders of Czech state, who lived from c. 907 to 935.

The libretto was written by Matouš Zill, a member of the Jesuit order in Prague. The drama begins with a dispute between Prince Václav (Wenceslaus) and the Prince of Kouřim in which Wenceslaus wins not by sword but the mind. The principal characters, who are allocated the majority of the musical numbers are allegorical figures that appear throughout all three acts of the drama. There is not any apparent plot in the play, it being rather a work in praise of religious devoutness and fortitude.

The work opens with an orchestral Sinfonia scored for 3 instrumental groups comprising two trumpets with timpani, a pair of oboes with bassoon and string ensemble with continuo. The Baroque concertante principle is utilised in several numbers in the score, polyphonic writing is featured in two pieces. In many parts, we can find innovative elements, e.g. the use of cello as a solo instrument (in part no. 28), combination of two concertino recorders with a couple of flutes (in part no. 24), solo part of flute (which was still a very young component in the range of Baroque instruments) in aria no. 33 and chorus no. 36, that combines strict fugal with richly scored orchestral music. The ceremonial character of the composition is emphasized by the use of trumpets and timpani in many parts of the work.

== Orchestration ==
All parts of the orchestra were original Baroque instruments. There were used: 17 violins, 7 viols, 5 cellos, 3 double basses, 4 oboes, 3 flutes, 2 bassoons, 2 recorders, 2 trumpets, 1 chalumeau and theorbo, timpani, harpsichord and positive organ. Vocal casting included 2 sopranos, 2 tenors, countertenor, bass and boy's choir. The tradition of Jesuits did not allow the use of female figures in the play. Consequently, soprano and alto parts were taken by students from the lower grades of Jesuits' music school.

== Parts ==
Symphonia

1. Symphonia – Allegro assai

Prolusio

2. Chorus. Allegro (Fortitudo mea)
3. Aria (Tenor). Allegro (Haec coeli)
4. Recitativo (Countertenor, Soprano). (Hem! Quoe ista?)
5. Aria (Soprano). Andante (En! Pietatis adamas)
6. Recitativo (Bass). (Dura certamina)
7. Aria (Bass). Allegro (Huc palmas deferte)
8. Recitativo (Tenor, soprano). (Haec summa gloriae)
9. Aria (Soprano). Allegro (Augusto domus Austriae)

Actus I

10. Aria. Allegro (I, Phoebe, umbras pelle)
11. Recitativo (En, en fidei aemula)
12. Aria. Andante (Huc virtutes festinate)
13. Chorus. Allegro (Eja de sigmentis)
14. Recitativo (Eja pietati)
15. Aria (Jam calle secundo)
16. Ritornello. Piu andante
17. Recitativo (Nunquid non messis tritici est?)
18. Aria (Meto culmos, lego spicas)

Actus II

19. Recitativo (Quicunque glorificaverit me)
20. Aria. Allegro (Angelicae mentes)
21. Chorus Angelorum (En prompti ad mandata)
22. Aria. Adagio (Ave Deus, ave redite)
23. Recitativo (Proh! quae aeris inclementia)
24. Aria. Andante (Veni, lux perennis)
25. Recitativo (Per me reges regnant)
26. Aria. Allegro assai (Exurge providentia)
27. Recitativo (Corona gloriae in manu Domini)
28. Aria. Andante (Huc coeli principes)

Actus III

29. Aria. Allegro (Reviresce, effloresce, pacis olea)
30. Recitativo (Aptate tympana)
31. Aria and Chorus (Vive, regna)
32. Aria. Allegro (Nova gaudia, nova jubila)
33. Aria. Allegro (En duplo sole Czechia)

Epilogus

34. Recitativo (Eja! Eja votivi omnia)
35. Aria. Allegro (Exsurge martis gloria)
36. Chorus. Vivace (Vos oriens adoret)

== Recordings ==
- Jan Dismas Zelenka: Sub olea pacis et palma virtutis, 2-CD set, Supraphon 2001; Cat. No. SU 3520-2 232; won 2003 Cannes Classical Awards

The composition was performed using authentic instruments of the Baroque era, tuned on A=415 Hz (Kirnberger III). The album was recorded in the Rothmayer Hall of Prague Castle on July 15–19, 2000. The total time of the recording is 95 minutes 11 seconds. A complete performance with the spoken dialogue would last approximately 2 hours 40 minutes.

Soloists: Noémi Kiss (soprano), Anna Hlavenková (soprano), Jaroslav Březina ([tenor), Adam Zdunikowsi (tenor), Aleš Procházka (bass), Markus Foerster (countertenor)

Ensembles: Musica Florea, Boni Pueri, Musica Aeterna, Ensemble Philidor

Conductors: Marek Štryncl (principal conductor, Musica Florea), Peter Zajíček (Musica Aeterna), Eric Baude-Delhommais (Ensemble Philidor), Pavel Horák (Boni Pueri choirmaster)

Orchestra members

- Baroque violin I – Peter Zajíček (principal), Zuzana Hrubšová, Petra Csaplárová, Ivana Sovová, Lenka Zelbová, Stanislav Palúch, Eleonora Machová, Veronika Jíchová, Jan Hádek, Jan Marek
- Baroque violin II – Dagmar Valentová (principal), Jiřina Doubravská, Markéta Knittlová, Vladimír Grenerová, Lubica Habartová, Miroslava Kobzová, Jindra Ouředníková, Eduardo García Salas, Vojtěch Fielder
- Baroque viola – Lydie Ladová, František Kuncl, Karol Němčík, Ján Grener, Donate Schack, Kateřina Trnavská, Peter Šesták
- Baroque cello – Olaf Reimers (principal), Peter Királ, Peter Krivda, Pavel Řezáč, Ondřej Michal
- Baroque double bass – Ondřej Štajnochr, Ján Krigovský, Jan Doskočil
- Baroque oboe – Marcel Plavec, Claire Michèle Bez, Marta Neumannová, Guillaume Cuiller
- Baroque bassoon – Juraj Korec, Kryštof Lada
- Baroque recorders – Marek Špelina, Marta Neumannová
- Baroque flutes – Marek Špelina, Martina Bernášková, Václav Kapsa
- Chalumeau – Christian Leitherer
- Baroque trumpet – Jean-François Madeuf, Jerome Prince
- Positive organ / harpsichord – Václav Luks, Iva Štrynclová
- Theorbo – Přemysl Vacek, Juraj Struhárik
- Baroque timpani – Pavel Rehberger
