= Il Serpente di Bronzo =

Il Serpente di Bronzo, ZWV 61 is a sacred cantata composed by the Czech composer Jan Dismas Zelenka (1679–1745).

It was composed in 1730 and was first performed in Dresden. The libretto used is a Biblical story slightly modified by Zelenka. It is sung in Italian and it is untraditional in the fact that God has several passages in the cantata. The story is of the Jewish people travelling from Egypt to the Promised Land.

Three Jews – Azaria, Egla and Namuel are fatigued by having to go on such a long journey and start complaining about their burden. This angers God, who sends one thousand snakes down to plague the blasphemers. Moses begs for forgiveness and is told by God to cast a snake out of bronze, hence the name Il Serpente di Bronzo – serpent of bronze. Anyone who is bitten by a snake and sees the bronze serpent will be saved. The end of the cantata is a repetition of the chorus from the beginning.

== Parts ==
- Azaria – Alto
- Egla – Soprano
- Namuel – Alto
- Mosè – Tenor
- Dio – Bass

== Structure ==
I. Coro
II. Recitativo (Azaria, Namuel)
III. Aria (Namuel)
IV. Recitativo (Egla)
V. Aria (Egla)
VI. Recitativo (Dio)
VII. Aria (Dio)
VIII. Recitativo (Azaria, Eglia, Namuel)
IX. Aria (Azaria)
X. Recitativo (Egla, Namuel)
XI. Aria a due (Egla, Namuel)
XII. Recitativo (Mosè)
XIII. Aria (Mosè)
XIV. Recitativo (Dio)
XV. Recitativo (Egla)
XVI. Arietta con recitativo (Egla, Azaria)
XVII. Aria (Azaria)
XVIII. Recitativo (Mosè)
XIX. Coro
