= Skuhrov (Jablonec nad Nisou District) =

- Municipality
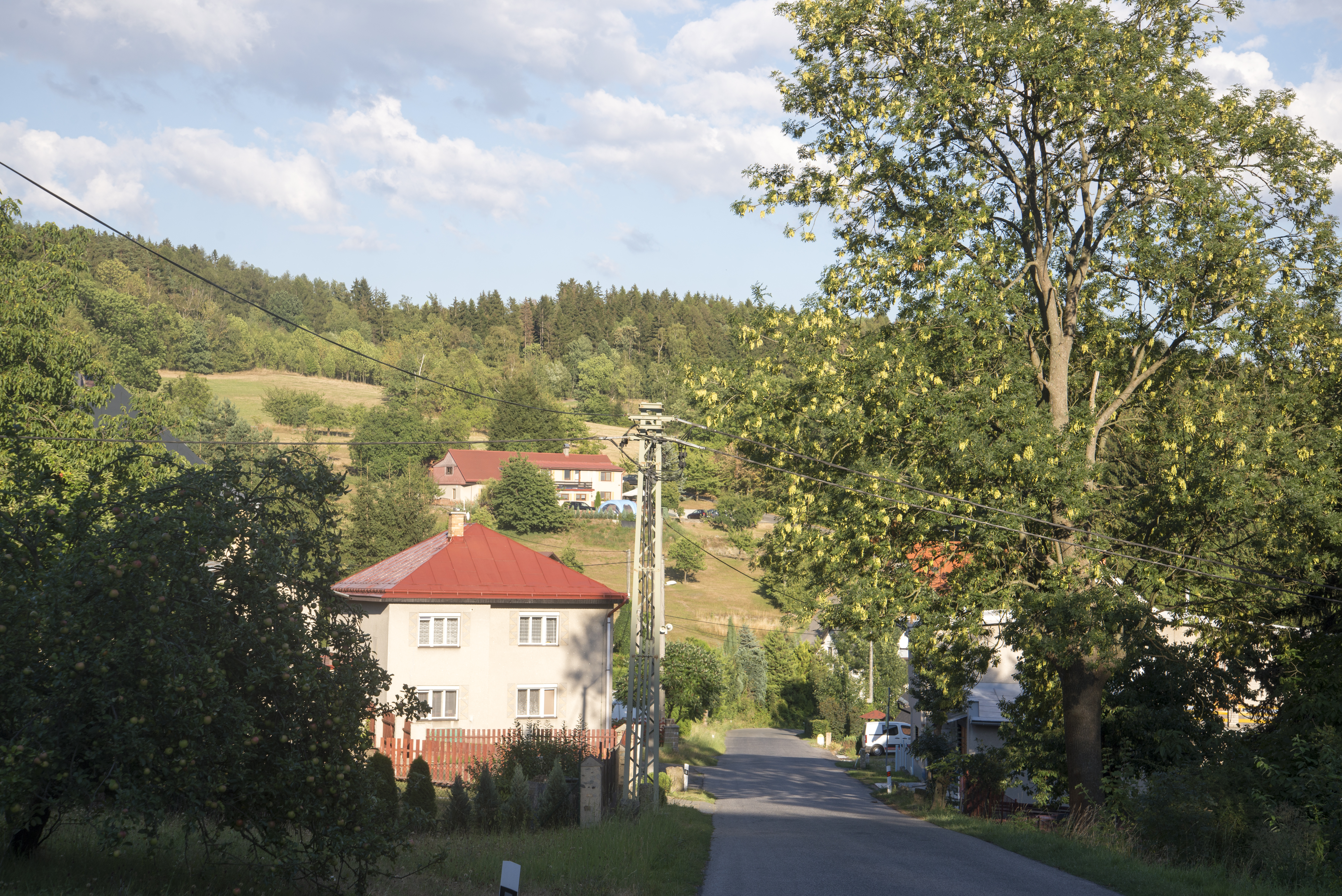
- View of Skuhrov

- Flag Coat of arms

- Location in the Czech Republic
- Coordinates: 50°40′34″N 15°12′48″E
- Country: Czech Republic
- Region: Liberec
- District: Jablonec nad Nisou
- First mentioned: 1543

Area
  - Total: 4.26 km^{2} (1.64 sq mi)
- Elevation: 481 m (1,578 ft)

Population (2026-01-01)
  - Total: 643
  - Density: 151/km^{2} (391/sq mi)
- Time zone: UTC+1 (CET)
  - Summer (DST): UTC+2 (CEST)
- Postal code: 468 34
- Website: www.skuhrov-huntirov.cz

Skuhrov is a municipality and village in Jablonec nad Nisou District in the Liberec Region of the Czech Republic. It has about 600 inhabitants.

== Administrative division ==
Skuhrov consists of five municipal parts (in brackets population according to the 2021 census):

- Skuhrov (215)
- Huntířov (379)

== Demographics ==
Historical population
Year	Pop.	±%
1869	732	—
1880	717	−2.0%
1890	820	+14.4%
1900	1,018	+24.1%
1910	994	−2.4%
1921	909	−8.6%
1930	1,011	+11.2%
1950	676	−33.1%
1961	590	−12.7%
1970	537	−9.0%
1980	554	+3.2%
1991	505	−8.8%
2001	498	−1.4%
2011	513	+3.0%
2021	594	+15.8%
Source: Censuses

== Notable people ==
- Marek Štryncl (born 1974), cellist and conductor
