= Missa Votiva =

The Missa votiva is a mass composed by the Czech Baroque composer Jan Dismas Zelenka in 1739, Dresden. The Missa votiva is about seventy minutes long, and its twenty parts range from forty-five seconds to over seven minutes in length.

Most of the composition is very festive and played with vivacity, the last movement being set to the tune of the first and many of the other arias being in a major key. Zelenka scored this work for a standard Baroque orchestra of strings and woodwinds, with the choral parts sung by a choir featuring several soloists who sing their own arias besides the parts for the whole choir. Even though a mass, the work is regarded as a highly complex musical composition, featuring "polyphonic formality" as well as operatic expression.

== Structure ==
1. Kyrie
2. Christe eleison
3. Kyrie 2
4. Kyrie 3
5. Gloria
6. Gratias agimus tibi
7. Qui tollis
8. Qui sedes
9. Quoniam to solus sanctus
10. Cum Sancto Spiritu 1
11. Cum Sancto Spiritu 2
12. Credo
13. Et incarnatus est
14. Crucifixus
15. Et resurrexit
16. Sanctus
17. Benedictus
18. Osanna in excelsis
19. Agnus Dei
20. Dona nobis pacem
