= Pavel Horák (choirmaster) =

Czech choirmaster (born 1967)

Pavel Horák (born April 23, 1967, in Pardubice) is a Czech choirmaster. He directed Boni Pueri Czech boy's choir alongside Jiří Skopal from 1991, becoming their sole choirmaster in 1996. He has led the ensemble in approximately 500 performances to date, both in the Czech Republic and on numerous foreign tours including those of United States, England, the Benelux countries, Denmark, Germany, Austria and France.
