= Hofkirchen bei Hartberg =

- Former municipality
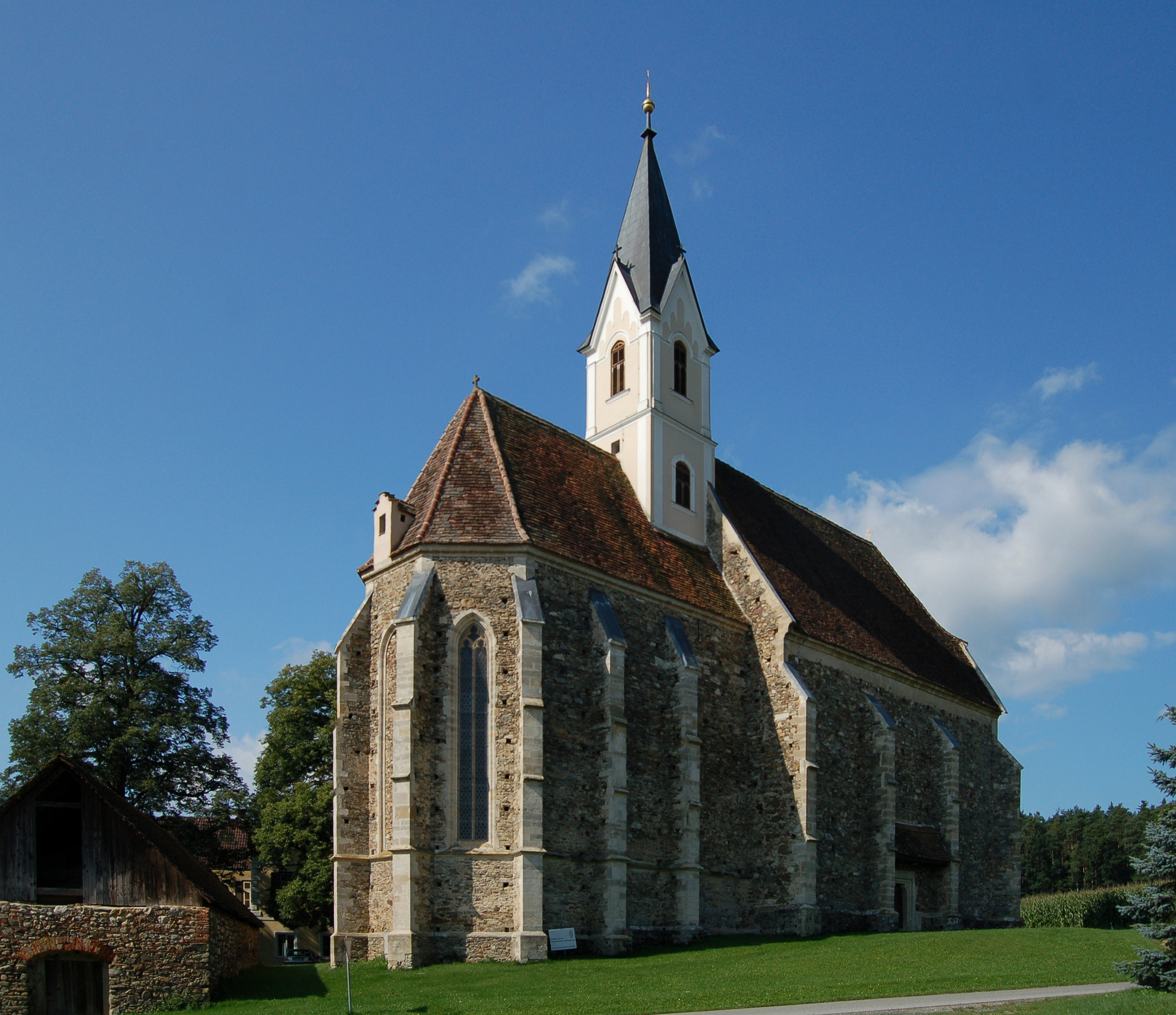
- Sankt Stefan church in Hofkirchen

- Coat of arms

- Location within Austria
- Coordinates: 47°13′48″N 15°52′03″E
- Country: Austria
- State: Styria
- District: Hartberg-Fürstenfeld

Area
  - Total: 6.62 km^{2} (2.56 sq mi)
- Elevation: 422 m (1,385 ft)

Population (1 January 2016)
  - Total: 639
  - Density: 96.5/km^{2} (250/sq mi)
- Time zone: UTC+1 (CET)
  - Summer (DST): UTC+2 (CEST)
- Postal code: 8224
- Area code: 03334
- Vehicle registration: HB
- Website: www.hofkirchen-hartberg.at

Hofkirchen bei Hartberg is a former municipality in the district of Hartberg-Fürstenfeld in Styria, Austria. Since the Styria municipal structural reform of 2015, it is part of the municipality of Kaindorf.
