= Maria Josepha =

Maria Josepha may refer to various princesses and archduchesses:

- Archduchess Maria Josepha of Austria (1687–1703), daughter of Leopold I, Holy Roman Emperor
- Maria Josepha of Austria, Queen of Poland (1699–1757), archduchess of Austria and consort of Augustus III of Poland
- Maria Josepha of Saxony, Dauphine of France (1731–1767), mother of the French kings Louis XVI, Louis XVIII, and Charles X
- Maria Josepha of Bavaria (1739–1767), archduchess of Austria and wife of Joseph II, Holy Roman Emperor
- Archduchess Maria Josepha of Austria (1751–1767), daughter of Francis I, Holy Roman Emperor, and fiancée of Ferdinand IV of Naples and Sicily
- Infanta Maria Josepha of Portugal (1857–1943), daughter of Miguel I of Portugal and wife of Karl Theodor, Duke in Bavaria
- Princess Maria Josepha of Saxony (1867–1944), mother of Emperor Charles I of Austria
- Princess Maria Josepha of Saxony (1928–2018), daughter of Friedrich Christian, Margrave of Meissen

== See also ==
- Maria Josepha Amalia of Saxony (1803–1829), third wife of Ferdinand VII of Spain
- Crown of Queen Maria Josepha, made for her coronation as queen consort of Poland in 1734
