= Hofkirche =

Hofkirche is the German language word for "court church", and may refer to:

== Dresden ==
Catholic

- Former Opernhaus am Taschenberg (Opera theatre at the Taschenberg, opened in 1667), changed to a Catholic Hofkirche, dedicated in 1708
- Dresden Cathedral, built 1739 to 1751, replacing the former as Hofkirche

Lutheran

- Sophienkirche, Protestant Hofkirche from 1737

== Other cities ==
- Allerheiligen-Hofkirche, the All Saints' Court Church, Munich, Germany
- Hofkirche, Innsbruck, Austria
- Hofkirche, Lucerne, Switzerland

== See also ==
- Hofkirchen (disambiguation)
