= Edita Adlerová =

Czech classical mezzo-soprano (born 1971)

- Born: 27 August 1971 (age 54); Pardubice, Czechoslovakia
- Genres: Opera
- Occupation: Singer
- Instrument: Vocals
- Website: editaadlerova.cz

Edita Adlerová (born 27 August 1971) is a Czech classical mezzo-soprano who has been active in operas, concerts, and recitals since the early 1990s. She is the recipient of the Czech Music Fund Award.

== Biography ==
Born in Pardubice, Adlerová studied singing at the Pardubice Conservatoire, earning a degree in vocal performance in 1991. Shortly after she graduated, Adlerová made her professional opera debut at the Plzeň Opera in the title role of Georges Bizet's Carmen. Only nineteen years old at the time, she remains the youngest singer to portray Carmen in Czech opera history. She has since created Carmen and Flamenco, a presentation of the music from Bizet's opera which features flamenco dancers and music arranged for two Spanish guitars and castanets.

While still occasionally appearing in operas, Adlerová has chiefly established herself in the concert repertoire, particularly in performing worked by contemporary Czech composers like Miloš Bok, Marek Kopelent, and Roman Z. Novák. She is also known for her work as an oratorio singer and her performances of pieces by Antonín Dvořák. She has sung in numerous concerts with the Prague Symphony Orchestra, including appearing as a featured soloist in the 1999 concert of Claude Debussy's Le martyre de Saint Sébastien under conductor Serge Baudo. She has also appeared as a soloist with the Prague Philharmonia, the Brno State Philharmonic, the Bohemian Chamber Philharmonic of Pardubice, the Philharmony Hradec Králové, and the Moravian Philharmonic Orchestra among other orchestras. Adlerová has also recorded several different song cycles with the Prague Radio Symphony Orchestra (SOČR) and recorded works for Czech radio and television.

As a chamber musician, Adlerová has appeared in concert with such ensembles as Czech Nonet and Clarinet Factory. She has also given two recitals at the Prague Spring International Music Festival, and appeared in recital at the Smetana's Litomyšl International Opera Festival, the Chișinău Spring Festival in Moldova, and Les Invalides in Paris. She has also given recitals of Jewish music at Prague's Nine Gates Festival.

== Sources ==
- Lidovky.cz
- Edita Adlerová: Carmen z pekárny - idnes.cz
- twovoices.cz - Edita Adlerová a Jana Rychterová
- Jiří Heller: Two voices - Neodolatelné hlasy Edity Adlerové a Jany Rychterové...
