= Missa Sanctae Caeciliae =

Mass by Jan Dismas Zelenka

- Mass by Jan Dismas Zelenka
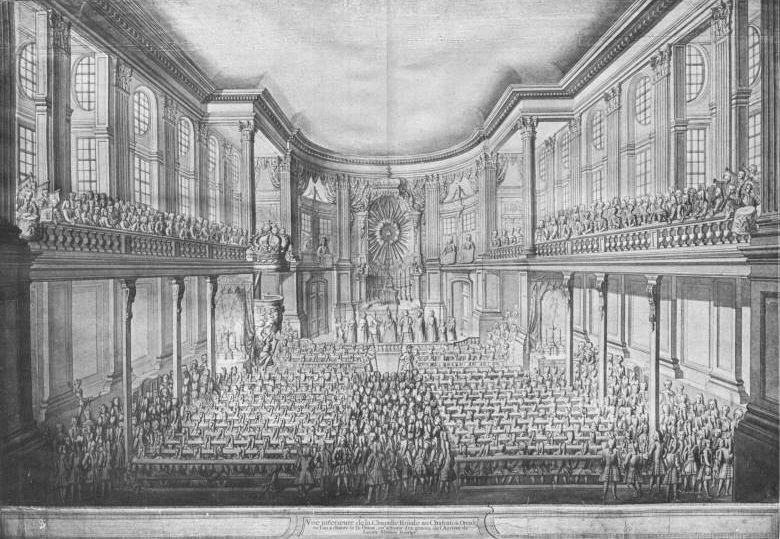
- The Court Chapel in Dresden, where the mass was first performed
- Catalogue: ZWV 1
- Text: Mass ordinary
- Language: Latin
- Performed: 22 November 1711
- Scoring: SATB soloists and choir; 2 oboes; bassoon; strings; continuo

Missa Sanctae Caeciliae (Saint Cecilia Mass) in G major, ZWV 1, is a mass for voices and orchestra by Jan Dismas Zelenka. It was completed in 1711 as his first work for the Dresden court.

== Description ==
Missa Sanctae Caeciliae was the first composition Jan Dismas Zelenka presented after he was employed as a musician at the court in Dresden in 1711. He arrived from Prague in 1710 to serve as a double bass player in the court orchestra, and turned to composing sacred music for the court which had converted to the Catholic Church. The mass, named after Saint Cecilia, the patron saint of music, was first performed at the Catholic Court Chapel on 22 November that year, and repeated there on 12 January 1712, this time in the presence of the Saxon Elector and Polish King, August II. Zelenka revised it several times, and used some parts for other purposes.

The mass was first printed in 2014 by Edition Walhall, edited by Martin Kellhuber for the series of sacred music (Reihe geistlicher Musik) of the Hochschule Regensburg.

== Structure and scoring ==
Zelenka structured the mass in several individual movements, subdividing the parts of the liturgical text especially in the Gloria and the Credo. He scored it for SATB soloists and choir, two oboes, bassoon, strings and continuo. The mass is in G major and takes about 45 minutes to perform.

- Kyrie
- Gloria
  - Gloria in excelsis Deo
  - Laudamus te
  - Gratias agimus tibi
  - Qui tollis
  - Qui tollis, suscipe
  - Quoniam tu solus Sanctus
  - Cum Sancto Spiritu
- Credo
  - Credo in unum Deum
  - Qui propter nos homines
  - Et incarnatus
  - Crucifixus
  - Et resurrexit
  - Et unam, sanctam
  - Et vitam venturi saeculi
- Sanctus
- Benedictus
- Agnus Dei
  - Agnus Dei
  - Dona nobis pacem

In this early work, described as "masterful" ("grande maîtrise") and "glorious", Zelenka used several features that became characteristic for his music, including "jaunty" rhythms, "intense" harmonies, vocal lines in high register and long fugue subjects. Zelenkas set Laudamus and Quoniam from the Gloria for soloists. The solo voices at times "oppose the choir dramatically", and choral fugues of great scope end the extended movements. The music is a precursor of the Viennese mass that flourished in the middle of the 18th century.

== Recordings ==
Missa Sanctae Caeciliae was first recorded in 2021 by Ensemble Inégal and the Prague Baroque Soloists, conducted by Adam Viktora, with soloists Gabriela Eibenová, Kai Wessel, Tobias Hunger, Marián Krejčík and Jaromír Nosek In a series of Zelenka's works by the same performers, which previously contained psalm settings for Vespers and two masses, it was coupled with a Marian offertory hymn, Currite ad aras (Precipitate yourselves to the altars), ZWV 166, probably the first work composed in Vienna, in June 1716. A reviewer noted that the performers rose to the challenges with class.
