= Louňovice pod Blaníkem =

- Market town
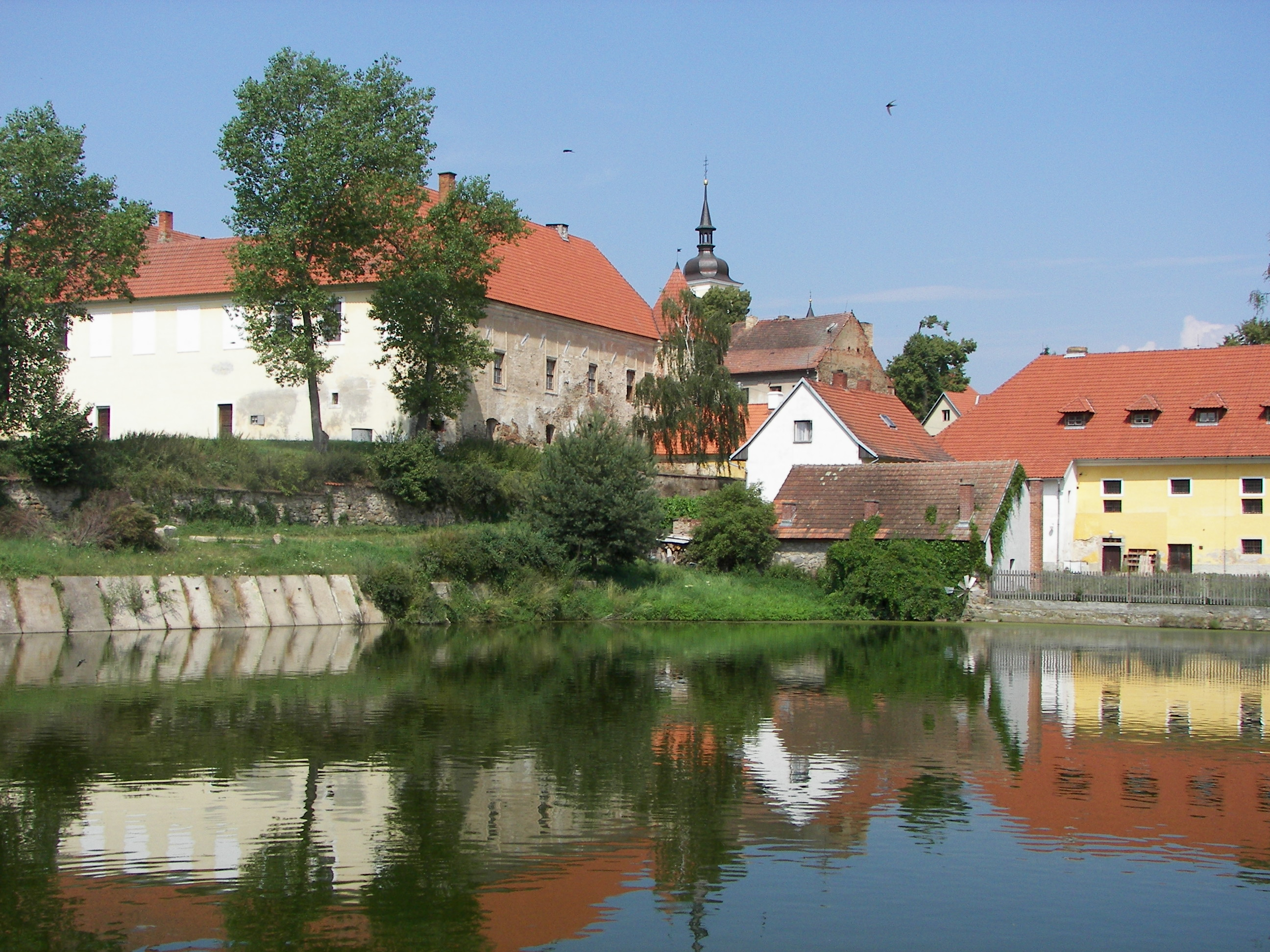
- Louňovice pod Blaníkem Castle

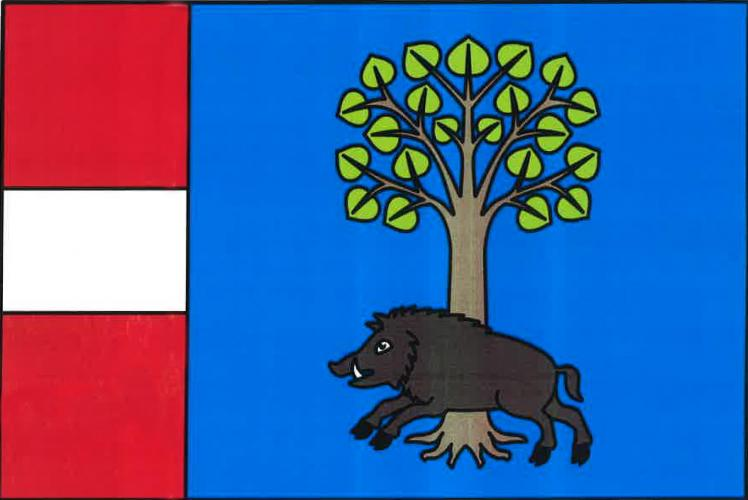
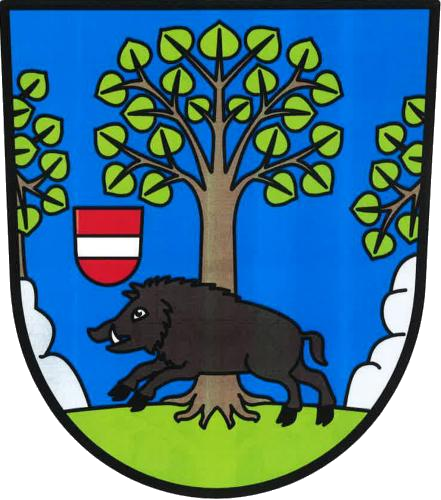
- Flag Coat of arms

- Location in the Czech Republic
- Coordinates: 49°38′14″N 14°50′48″E
- Country: Czech Republic
- Region: Central Bohemian
- District: Benešov
- First mentioned: 1149

Area
  - Total: 17.11 km^{2} (6.61 sq mi)
- Elevation: 400 m (1,300 ft)

Population (2026-01-01)
  - Total: 665
  - Density: 38.9/km^{2} (101/sq mi)
- Time zone: UTC+1 (CET)
  - Summer (DST): UTC+2 (CEST)
- Postal code: 257 06
- Website: www.lounovicepodblanikem.cz

Louňovice pod Blaníkem (Czech pronunciation: [ˈlouɲovɪtsɛ ˈpod blaɲiːkɛm]; German: Launiowitz) is a market town in Benešov District in the Central Bohemian Region of the Czech Republic. It has about 700 inhabitants. It is located on the Blanice River.

== Administrative division ==
Louňovice pod Blaníkem consists of five municipal parts (in brackets population according to the 2021 census):

- Louňovice pod Blaníkem (585)
- Býkovice (38)
- Mrkvová Lhota (16)
- Rejkovice (5)
- Světlá (10)

== Etymology ==
The name Louňovice is derived from the surname Louň, meaning "the village of Louň's people". In the oldest documents, the personal name was written as Lúň and the name of the settlement as Lúňovice. The suffix pod Blaníkem means 'below Blaník'.

== Geography ==
Louňovice pod Blaníkem is located about 20 kilometres (12 mi) southeast of Benešov and 52 km (32 mi) southeast of Prague. It lies in the Vlašim Uplands. The highest point is the mountain of Velký Blaník at 638 m (2,093 ft) above sea level, notable as the object of one of the most popular national legends. The Blanice River flows through the municipal territory. The entire territory lies within the Blaník Protected Landscape Area.

== History ==
The first written mention of Louňovice is from 1149, when there was founded a women's Premonstratensian monastery. In 1420, the monastery was burned down by the Hussites. From 1436 to 1547, Louňovice was property of the town of Tábor. The then-owner of Louňovice Oldřich Skuhrovský had built a Renassaince fortress in the second half of the 16th century. From 1672 until the 20th century, Louňovice was owned by the archbishopric of Prague.

== Demographics ==
Historical population

Year	Pop.	±%
1869	1,257	—
1880	1,213	−3.5%
1890	1,119	−7.7%
1900	1,059	−5.4%
1910	1,089	+2.8%

Year	Pop.	±%
1921	1,090	+0.1%
1930	932	−14.5%
1950	719	−22.9%
1961	714	−0.7%
1970	671	−6.0%

Year	Pop.	±%
1980	643	−4.2%
1991	680	+5.8%
2001	707	+4.0%
2011	643	−9.1%
2021	654	+1.7%

Source: Censuses

== Transport ==
There are no railways or major roads passing through the municipality.

== Sights ==
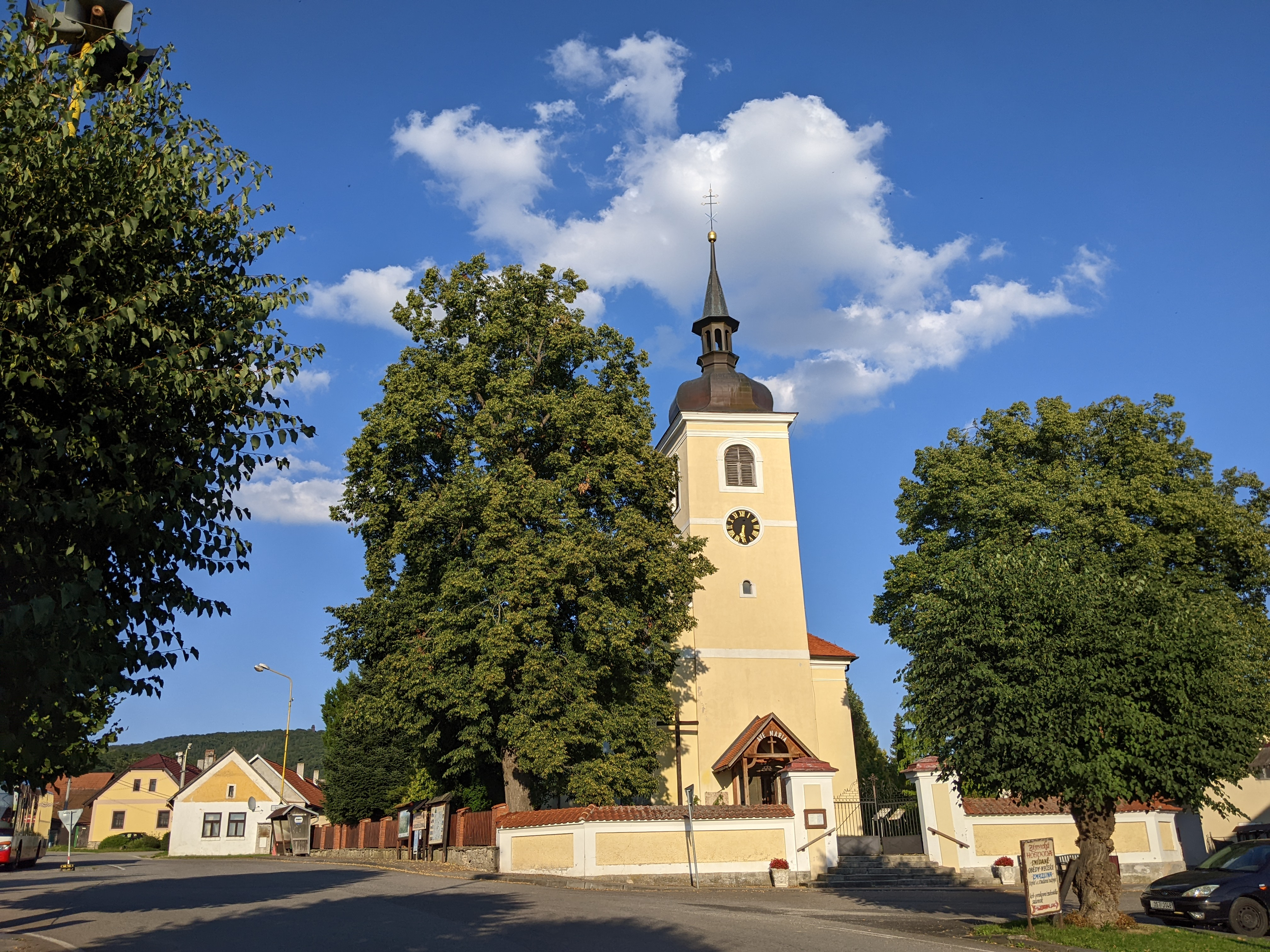
Church of the Assumption of the Virgin Mary

The Louňovice pod Blaníkem Castle is located on the town square. The former fortress was extended into the current castle in 1652. Today it houses the tourist infocentre and a museum.

The second landmark of Louňovice pod Blaníkem is the Church of the Assumption of the Virgin Mary. It is a Baroque building with a Gothic core.

The most popular tourist destination is the mountain Velký Blaník with an observation tower on its top. On the top of Malý Blaník is a ruin of the Chapel of Saint Mary Magdalene.

== Notable people ==
- Jan Dismas Zelenka (1679–1745), Baroque composer and musician
- Petr Borkovec (born 1970), poet, translator and journalist
