= Marek Štryncl =

Czech conductor and cellist (born 1974)

- Born: 1974 (age 50–51); Skuhrov, Liberec, Czechoslovakia
- Genres: Classical
- Occupations: Conductor; cellist; choirmaster; composer
- Instrument: Cello
- Member of: Musica Florea
- Website: marekstryncl.cz

Marek Štryncl (born 1974) is a Czech conductor, cellist, choirmaster, and composer. He is the founder and leader of the Baroque ensemble Musica Florea.

== Biography ==
Marek Štryncl was born in Skuhrov, in the Liberec Region. He studied cello at the Teplice conservatory and the Dresdner Akademie für alte Musik in Dresden, Germany, and conducting at the Academy of Performing Arts in Prague.

He was still a student when he established the Baroque ensemble Musica Florea, in 1992, and the group holds a regular concert series in Prague and in other regions of Czechia. In 1994, Štryncl conducted a recording of Jan Dismas Zelenka's Missa Sanctissimae Trinitatis for Studio Matouš as well as live at the Prague Spring International Music Festival a year later. Also in 1995, he conducted another work by Zelenka, Sub olea pacis et palma virtutis, at the St. Wenceslas Festival in Prague. He has also created a transportable Baroque theatre called Florea Theatrum, and he leads the International Summer School of Early Music in Valtice.

Musica Florea has received a number of awards, among them the highest rating from the French magazine Diapason for Missa Sanctissimae Trinitatis (1994), the music critics' award for best interpretative performance at the 7th Central European Festival of Concert Art in Žilina (1997), and the 1997 Zlatá Harmonie award for best domestic recording of the year, for their work on mezzo-soprano Magdalena Kožená's album Arias, which encompasses arias, cantatas, and oratorios by Johann Sebastian Bach. In 2003, the ensemble won the Cannes Classical Awards for the recording of Sub olea pacis et palma virtutis.
