= Jan Dismas Zelenka =

Czech composer (1679–1745)

- Born: 16 October 1679; Louňovice pod Blaníkem, Bohemia, Holy Roman Empire
- Died: 23 December 1745 (aged 66); Dresden, Holy Roman Empire
- Resting place: Old Catholic Cemetery, Dresden
- Occupations: Composer, Performer, Violonist, Musician
- Era: Baroque

Jan Dismas Zelenka (16 October 1679 – 23 December 1745) was a Czech composer and musician of the Baroque period. His music is admired for its harmonic inventiveness and mastery of counterpoint.

Zelenka was raised in Central Bohemia, educated in Prague and Vienna, and spent his professional life in Dresden. The greatest success during his career was the performance of the extensive composition Sub olea pacis et palma virtutis in the presence of the Emperor Charles VI, shortly after his coronation as king of Bohemia in 1723.

== Life ==
=== Early life ===
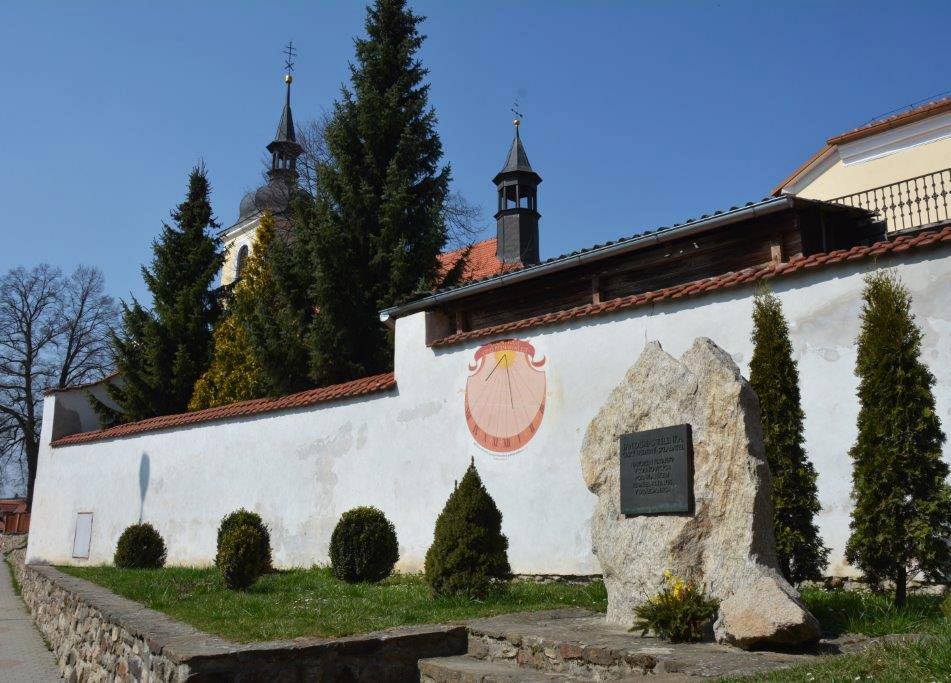
Zelenka's place of birth at Louňovice pod Blaníkem marked by a memorial plaque and a sundial

Zelenka, baptised Jan Lukáš Zelenka, was born in Louňovice pod Blaníkem in Bohemia, a market town southeast of Prague. He was the eldest of eight children born to Marie Magdalena (née Hájek) and Jiří Zelenka. The middle name Dismas is probably his confirmation name. Zelenka's father Jiří was a schoolmaster and organist in Louňovice, and was likely his first music teacher. Nothing more is known with certainty about Zelenka's early years, except that he received his musical training at the Jesuit college Clementinum in Prague and that his instrument was the violone (bass viol). His earliest known work is the school drama Via laureta (ZWV 245), composed in 1704, from which only the libretto has been preserved.

In 1709 in Prague, Zelenka served Baron von Johann Hubert von Hartig before his appointment as a violone player in Dresden's royal orchestra. Baron von Hartig was a well-known connoisseur of music and a skilled musician. He corresponded with many important Italian composers. Baron von Hartig amassed a great music library to which Zelenka would later have access, including notably Antonio Lotti's Missa Sapientiae. Zelenka copied this work from Hartig's collection around 1729, and later, in the 1730s, Johann Sebastian Bach acquired a copy of it from Zelenka's library. George Frideric Handel's copy of the same Mass might also have been acquired through Zelenka. When Johann Hubert died in Prague in 1741, Zelenka dedicated his Litaniae Lauretanae 'Salus infirmorum' (ZWV 152) to his old patron.

=== Dresden Court Orchestra ===
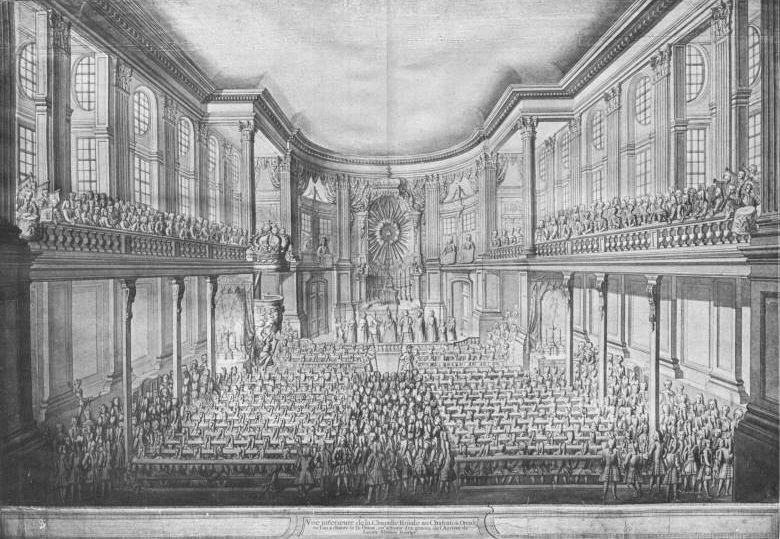
Interior of the Court Chapel

Baron von Hartig may have recommended Zelenka to the Dresden Hofkapelle (court orchestra) as a double bass player. He entered the service of the Dresden court with a salary of 300 thalers in 1710/11. The conditions for music making added impetus to his creativity, particularly with respect to the composition of sacred music for the Catholic court church. His first major work in Dresden was a Mass, the Missa Sanctae Caeciliae (c. 1711). Zelenka's music must have impressed the court, because only a few months after his arrival in Dresden his salary was increased to 350 thalers. This placed him among the most highly paid musicians in the Hofkapelle. Three years later, it was raised to 400 thalers.

In 1716, Zelenka continued his education in Vienna under the Habsburg Imperial Kapellmeister Johann Joseph Fux. It is unlikely that he visited Venice as once thought. A Saxon court document of 1715 records a royal cash advance for a trip to Italy by Zelenka with his fellow musicians and composers Pierre Gabriel Buffardin, Johann Christian Richter and Johann Georg Pisendel. New documents confirming the arrival of the oboist Richter and violinist Pisendel in Italy have now surfaced but neither Zelenka nor Buffardin were travelling with them.

Back in Dresden in 1719, he remained there except for an extended stay in Prague in 1722–3, when he conducted the première of one of his major secular works, Sub olea pacis et palma virtutis conspicua orbi regia Bohemiae Corona (a melodrama about St. Wenceslas), at the time of the coronation of Charles VI. While in Prague he composed some of his highly original instrumental works, as seen in the autograph of the score of Concerto à 8 Concertanti — "Six concerti written in a hurry in Prague in 1723" (ZWV 186, 187, 188, 189).

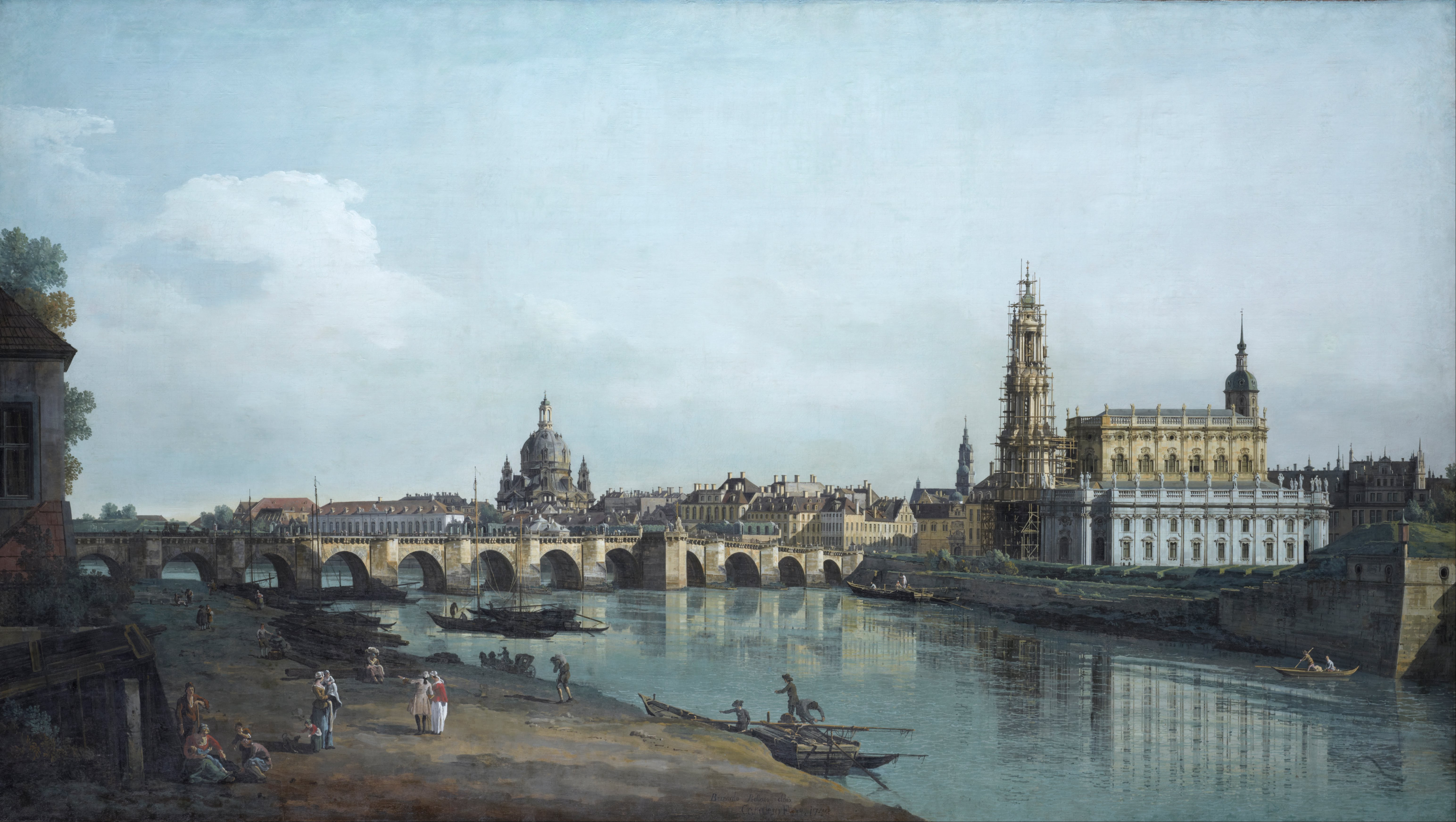
View from the right bank of the Elbe on the mid–18th century Baroque city of Dresden, the seat of the Elector and ruler of Saxony

In the early 1720s, Zelenka composed some works such as the Responsoria pro hebdomada (ZWV 55) and the Lamentations (ZWV 53). His compositions still constitute an important part of the repertoire of the Catholic court church. Following the frequent illnesses of Kapellmeister Johann David Heinichen, Zelenka gradually took over the direction of the sacred music. In January 1726, he began entering his own works and those of others he collected into a register called Inventarium (1726–39), one of the most important documents of Dresden baroque music. In July 1729, Heinichen died and Zelenka became acting Kapellmeister, a position he occupied in an unofficial capacity until 1734. This period is known as the Interregnum, a term coined by Professor Wolfgang Horn.

=== Interregnum ===
The first work that confirms Zelenka's new status is a Sinfonia (ZWV 190, 18 May 1729, previously known as Capriccio), which, as Janice B. Stockigt has established, was performed at a Gala to celebrate the birthday of the Saxon Elector and Polish king, Augustus II the Strong. The official publication Königl. Polnischer und Churfürstl. Sächsischer Hoff- und Staats-Calender (Hof- from 1734), which listed the members and servants of the Dresden court, listed Zelenka as a Contra-Basso & Compositeur in the editions of 1731 and 1732. In 1733, he is listed as a Compositeur only, which suggests that he was no longer playing the double bass. Instead, he most likely directed the music in his capacity as a singer.

The period of the Interregnum gave birth to a number of outlandish theories on Zelenka's position at the Dresden court, and especially around his petitions from October/November 1733 for the Kapellmeister position. The fact is that before the death of Heinichen in 1729, the Dresden court was already actively looking for a well-established opera composer to take Heinichen's place. This was a part of a long-term project to re-establish the Italian opera in Dresden. In 1724, the Dresden court began training five young Italian opera singers with some of the finest vocal teachers in Italy like Nicola Porpora, a great composer in his own right and future teacher of the young Joseph Haydn. In the first week of February 1730, the young singers, the castrato alto Domenico Annibali, the castrato sopranos Giovanni Bindi (also called Porporino), Ventura Rocchetti 'Venturini' and the sister sopranos Maria Rosa Negri and Anna Negri were called to Dresden. There is hardly any coincidence that in the same week, Johann Adolf Hasse was offered the "primo" Kapellmeister position.

Following the arrival of the five young singers in Dresden in April 1730, Zelenka played an important role in their continuing education. After the "compositeur de la musique italienne" Giovanni Alberto Ristori travelled to Moscow in the end of 1730, while Zelenka, as the senior composer at the court, became responsible for supplying secular vocal music for the chamber concerts at the royal palace in Dresden. It is at this point in time when he began to assemble his fascinating collection of Italian opera and cantata scores, which partly still exists in Dresden and are individually numbered in Zelenka's own hand. This suggest that he wrote down a complete inventory of the secular works in his possession, and by referring to the numbers he assigned each work it was possible to reconstruct the now missing inventory. This included a number of arias of Hasse, who arrived in Dresden in July 1731 with his famous wife, Faustina Bordoni-Hasse, the most brilliant female singer of the Baroque era. Shortly after his arrival, Hasse was officially appointed Kapellmeister and retained the position for the next 32 years. After the performances of his opera Cleofide in September 1731, Hasse and Faustina travelled back to Italy, but not before the future arrangements of the Hofkapelle had been decided and later put in motion. Pisendel, one of the greatest violinist of the baroque era, was officially appointed Konzertmeister. Eleven new musicians were hired for the orchestra on 28 November of the same year. On that same day, Zelenka was awarded a handsome salary increase of 37.5%, which brought his wages up to 550 thalers. This might have enabled him to purchase 24 opera arias, one duet, eight secular cantatas and two sacred motets in score from Antonio Vivaldi, which he was then able to use both in the chamber and the church.

=== Court of Augustus III ===
After Augustus II died in Warsaw on 1 February 1733, his son and successor as Saxon Elector Augustus III moved swiftly and signed Hasse and Faustina to an extraordinary contract worth an astonishing 6,000 thalers annually, while their travel expenses were also paid for by the court. At that time, Hasse was already one of the most famous composers in Europe and it was a major coup for the Dresden court to have secured his and Faustina's services. Confirmation of Hasse's position is seen in the libretto to his Siroe which was performed in Bologna in May 1733, where the composer was awarded the title of Maestro di Cappella di S.A. R. l’Elettore di Sassonia. In that same month, Zelenka was also referred to as the elector's "well-born and virtuoso Kapellmeister" in a letter written by the Superior of the Catholic court church in Dresden.

Following the election of Polish king Augustus III in October 1733, servants from all departments of the Dresden court sent in petitions for unpaid salaries or promotions. Zelenka was one of those who petitioned. The impression has often been given in the literature that Zelenka was in direct competition with Hasse for the Kapellmeister position, but this is a misunderstanding. It was very clear to Zelenka at that time that his colleague Hasse was, and would remain, senior Kapellmeister. This led the Dresden court to create the official position of church composer (essentially Vice-Kapellmeister), which Zelenka held from 1734 onwards, along with his student Tobias Buz and, from November 1736 onwards, J. S. Bach, who received a "titular" position.

=== Death ===
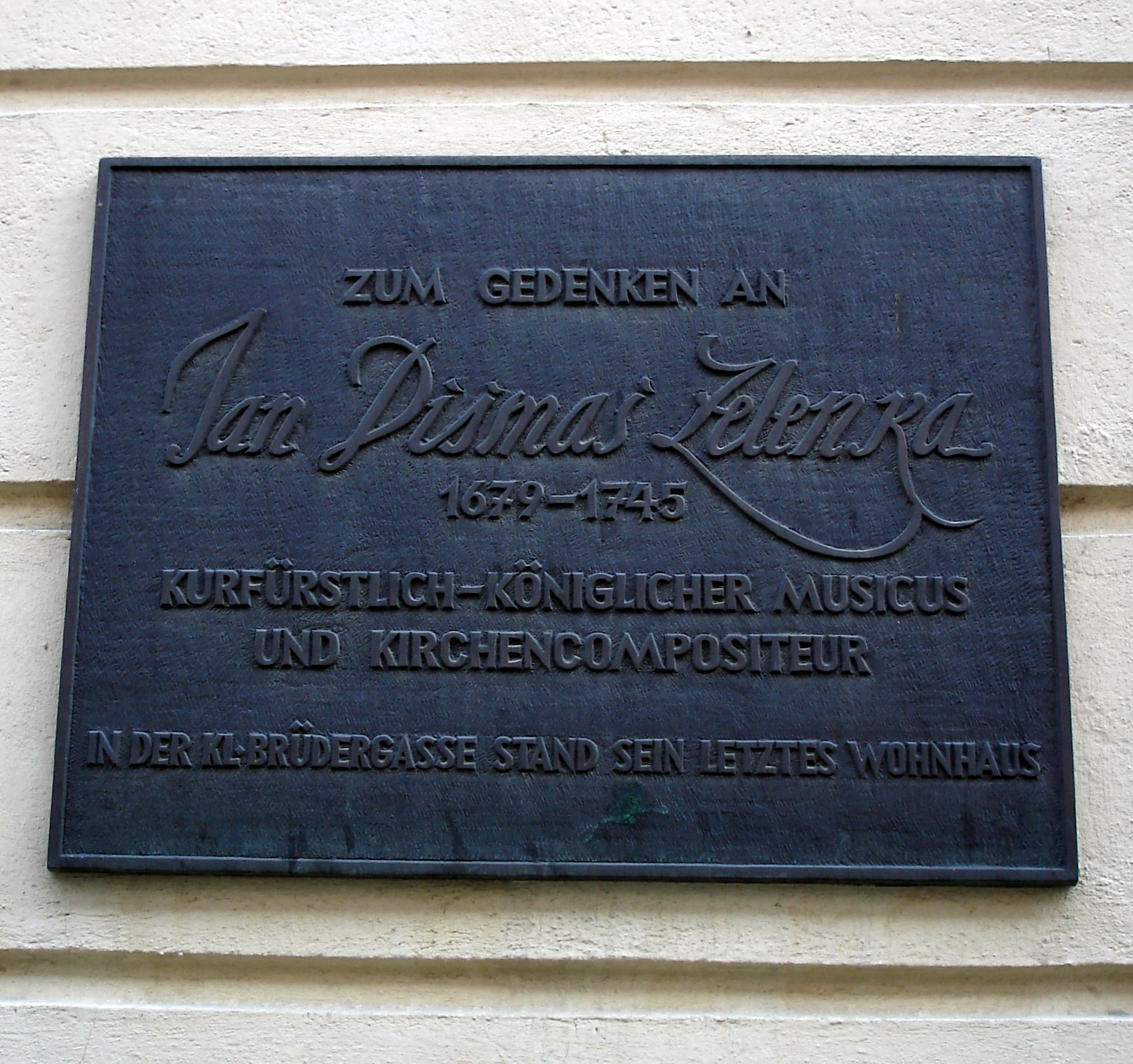
Plaque in the Kleine Brüdergasse in Dresden commemorating Zelenka's last place of residence

On 23 December 1745, Zelenka died in Dresden. He never married and had no children, and Zelenka's compositions and musical estate were purchased from his beneficiaries by the Electress of Saxony and the Queen of Poland Maria Josepha of Austria. After his death, these documents were considered valuable court possessions. Telemann, with Pisendel's assistance, tried unsuccessfully to publish Zelenka's "Responsoria." On 17 April 1756, he wrote that "the complete manuscript will be at the Dresden court, kept under lock and key as something very rare."

== Influence and reception ==
Bach held Zelenka in high esteem, and the two composers knew each other, as evidenced by a letter of 13 January 1775 from his son C.P.E. Bach to the Bach biographer Johann Nikolaus Forkel. Bach was trusted enough by Zelenka for his eldest son Wilhelm Friedemann to copy out the Amen from Zelenka's third Magnificat (ZWV 108) to use in the Leipzig's St. Thomas' Church, where J. S. Bach was cantor for the last two and a half decades of his life. In addition to composing, Zelenka taught throughout his life a number of prominent musicians of his time, like Johann Joachim Quantz (Frederick the Great of Prussia's longtime court flautist and flute teacher) and J. G. Roellig. His close friends included eminent composers such as Georg Philipp Telemann, Johann Georg Pisendel and Sylvius Leopold Weiss.

Despite his posthumous neglect, Zelenka was highly regarded during his own career and was respected by significant composers of the day, such as Telemann, Bach (as aforementioned), and Graupner. His music's innovative counterpoint (such as in the Miserere in D Minor, ZWV 56), clarity, and part-writing (especially in his fugues) earned him the respect of some of the most renowned contrapuntists (composers and performers who practice the art of counterpoint).

Between the years 1716 and 1719, Zelenka studied under the guidance of Johann Joseph Fux (1660–1741), the author of Gradus ad Parnassum in Vienna and accepted Johann Joachim Quantz (1697–1773) as one of his students. Zelenka also met A. Caldara (1671–1736) as well as F.B. Conti (c. 1681–1732) in Vienna, Austria.

== Rediscovery ==
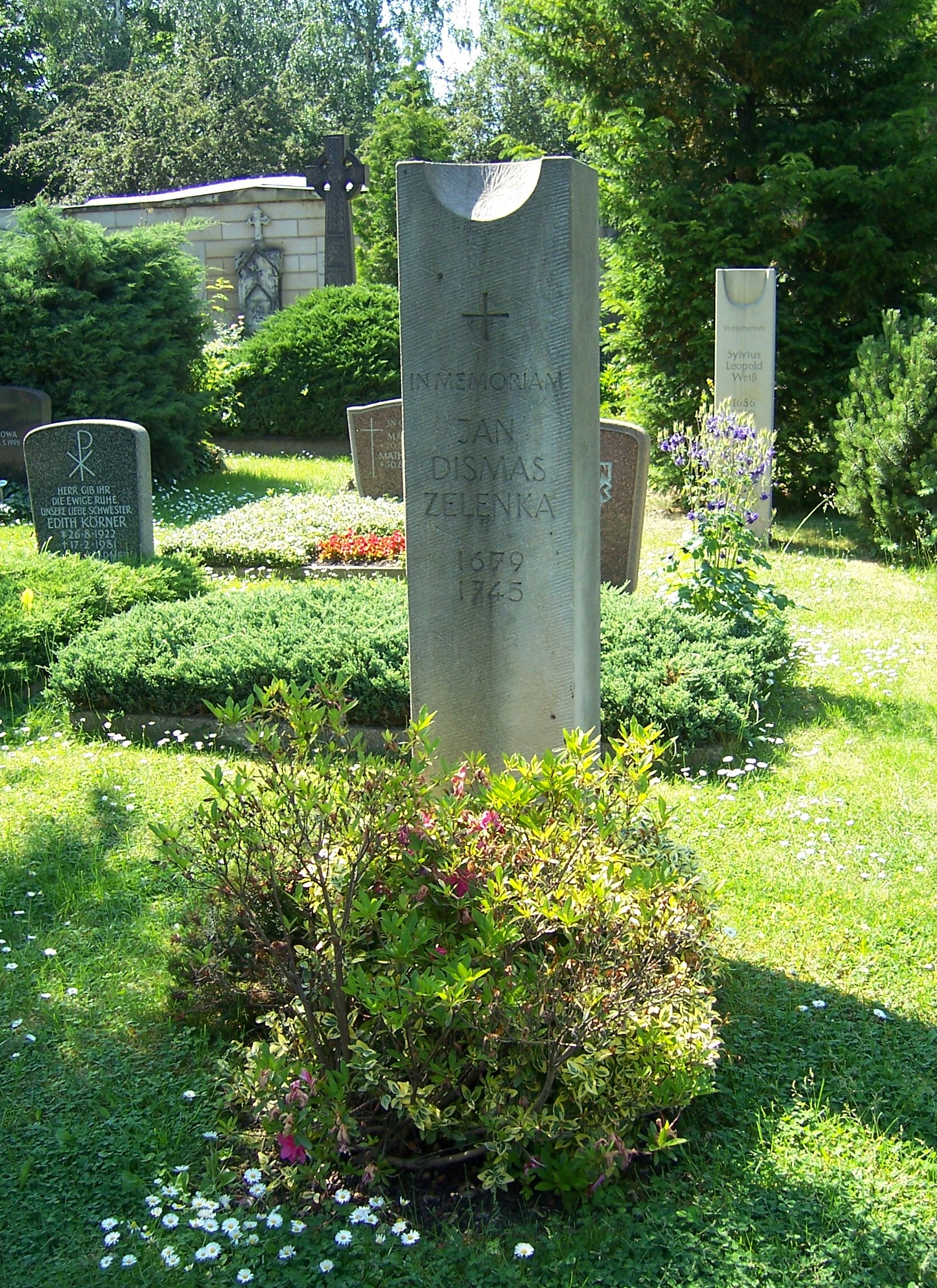
Zelenka memorial site at the Old Catholic Cemetery in Dresden

The rediscovery of Jan Dismas Zelenka's work is attributed to Bedřich Smetana, who rewrote some scores from the archives in Dresden and introduced one of the composer's orchestral suites in Prague's New Town Theatre festivals in 1863.

It was mistakenly assumed that many of Zelenka's autograph scores were destroyed during the firebombing of Dresden in February 1945. However, the scores were not kept in the Katholische Hofkirche but in the basement of the Japanese Palace, north of the river Elbe. Some are certainly missing, but this probably happened gradually – and the lost scores represent only a small proportion of his total works.

Interest in Zelenka's music has grown, especially since the end of the 1950s with the revival of interest in Baroque music.

By the late 1960s and early 1970s all Zelenka's instrumental compositions and selected liturgical music were published in Czechoslovakia. The most important revival was demonstrated by the first presentation of selected compositions by the Czech conductor Milan Munclinger and his ensemble Ars Rediviva. They were three trio sonatas in 1958–60, Sinfonia concertante in 1963 and the exquisite interpretation of "Lamentationes Jeremiae prophetae" with the soloists Karl Berman, Nedda Casei and Theo Altmeyer in 1969. The music of Zelenka has become widely known and available through recordings and sparked the interest of other musicians such as Heinz Holliger and Reinhard Goebel.

More than half of Zelenka's works have now been recorded, mostly in the Czech Republic and Germany. Such recordings include the masses Missa Purificationis, Missa Sanctissimae trinitatis, Missa Votiva, Missa Sancti Josephi, and his secular works "Sub olea pacis" and "Il Diamante", mostly performed by new Czech ensembles using original instruments and interpretational techniques of the Baroque era. The most popular are Musica Florea, Collegium 1704, Ensemble Inégal, and Capella Regia Musicalis.

In honor of Jan Dismas Zelenka, in 1984 the Autumn Music Festival under Blaník was founded and commemorated with the memorial plaque on his house. Since then, performances of Zelenka's music have regularly taken place in and around his birthplace.

Several analyses of the composer's sacred and instrumental compositions (particularly fugues and other counterpoint) have contributed to his popularity, due to the efforts of both musicologists and organizations dedicated to the dissemination of his work. The most analyzed of Zelenka's compositions are his masses, requiems, litanies and other sacred vocal compositions, which have, ever since the revival of his music, experienced a surge in reputation and veneration. According to Susanne Oschmann, "Jan Dismas Zelenka has of late been recognized as one of the most original composers of a musical epoch that was long thought to have been shaped by Bach and Handel", and according to Heinz Holliger, "It seems essential to me, that Zelenka (like Bach) obviously has absorbed the total compositional knowledge of the previous generations, and, by virtue of his most individual personality exposes it to a breaking test, thus setting free a critical element opposing the tradition."

== Works ==
Zelenka's complete compositions are listed in the digitized database of the Petrucci Music Library, as well as on the Discover Zelenka website.

The total number of Zelenka's known and attributed opus-numbered works is 249. The sacred vocal-instrumental music is at the center of his compositions and include over 20 masses, four extensive oratorios and requiems, two Magnificats and Te Deum settings, 13 litanies, many psalms, hymns, and antiphons. Zelenka also wrote a number of purely instrumental works – six trio or quartet sonatas, five capricci, one "Hipocondrie" and other concertos, overtures and symphonies.

The most appreciated of Zelenka's sacred works are his masses, above all his Missa Purificationis (ZWV 16, his last mass to include brass instruments) and his final five pieces (ZWV 17–21), commonly called "High Mass" compositions, written between 1736 and 1741 and considered as Zelenka's compositional peak. The last three were also called "Missae ultimae" (Last Masses).

== Sources ==
- Stockigt, Janice B. (2000), Jan Dismas Zelenka – A Bohemian musician at the court of Dresden, Oxford: Oxford University Press, ISBN 0-19-816622-2
- Smolka, Jaroslav (2006), Jan Dismas Zelenka, Prague: Akademie múzických umění v Praze, ISBN 80-7331-075-9.
