= Mozart and Prague =

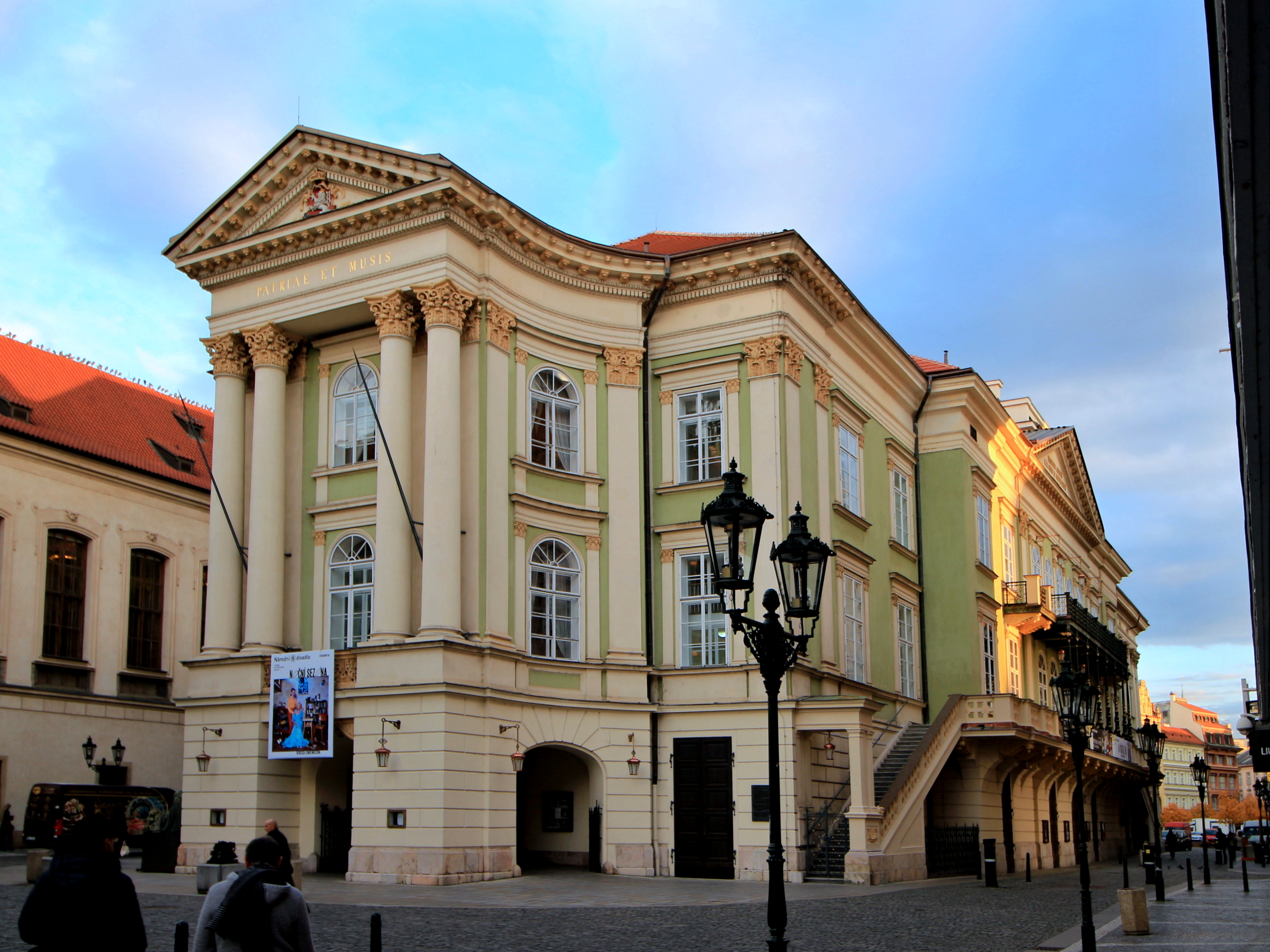
Estates Theatre in Prague, where two of Mozart's operas were premiered, continues as a performance venue today.

Although most of Wolfgang Amadeus Mozart's mature musical career took place in Vienna, he also made several journeys to Prague, a regional capital about 300km to the northwest, for purposes of musical performance. Prague saw first a revival production of Mozart's opera The Marriage of Figaro, later the premieres of Don Giovanni, the Symphony No. 38 ("Prague") and La clemenza di Tito. These works received a warm reception in Prague, leading some authors to suggest a special affection and affinity between Mozart and the music lovers of this city. For instance, Lorenzo Da Ponte, who wrote the libretto for Don Giovanni, wrote:

It is not easy to convey an adequate conception of the enthusiasm of the Bohemians for [Mozart's] music. The pieces which were admired least of all in other countries were regarded by those people as things divine; and, more wonderful still, the great beauties which other nations discovered in the music of that rare genius only after many, many performances, were perfectly appreciated by the Bohemians on the very first evening.

A quotation from Mozart (whose authenticity is difficult to confirm) suggests that he himself felt a special affinity: "Meine Prager verstehen mich" – "My Praguers understand me".

== Background ==
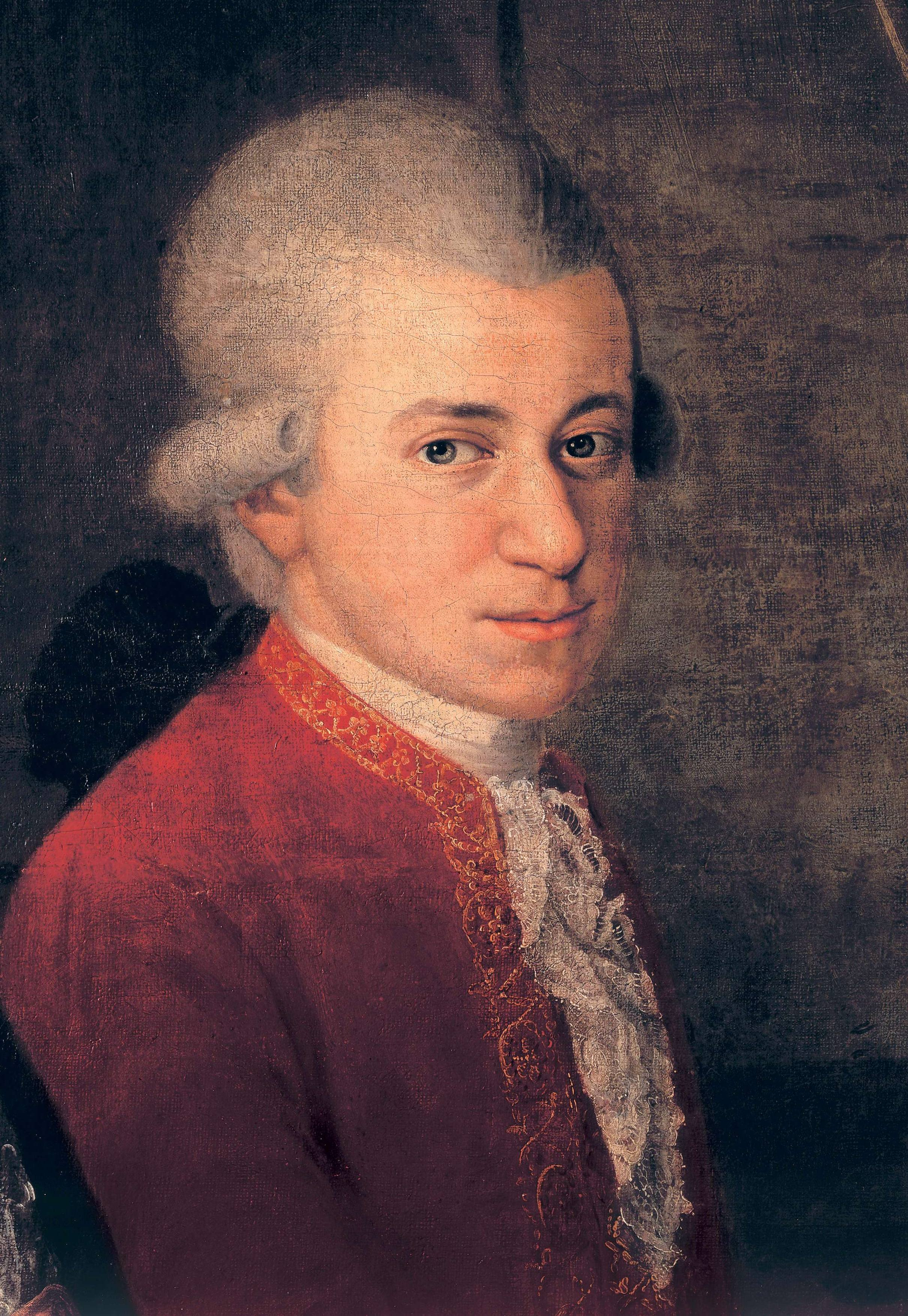
Detail of Wolfgang from the 1780–81 Portrait of the Mozart Family

Daniel E. Freeman describes conditions that made Prague attractive as a musical destination for Mozart in the 1780s. The city had recently recovered from the severe depopulation caused by the departure of the Imperial Habsburg court from Prague in 1612, as well as the dire effects of the Thirty Years' War (1618–1648), whose military conflicts both started and ended in the city. Prague always retained a certain prestige as the capital city of the kingdom of Bohemia, it took over a century for the city to rebuild its cultural institutions in a way worthy of a major European city, usually under the sponsorship of the Bohemian nobles.

The recovery in civic life led to the construction of a magnificent new opera theater, opened in 1783, known at the time as the National Theater (of the kingdom of Bohemia) and built at the expense of a visionary noble, Count Franz Anton von Nostitz-Rieneck of the Nostitz family. It was later purchased by the Estates of Bohemia and was called the Estates Theatre, the name it still bears today. An outstanding conductor, Johann Joseph Strobach, built up the opera orchestra of Prague into a strong ensemble.

Mozart also had good musical friends in the city, the couple Franz Xaver and Josepha Duschek. Josepha had a particularly strong connection with Mozart as a result of frequent visits she made to his native city of Salzburg, where she had relatives (one of her grandfathers was once mayor of Salzburg).

Local interest in Mozart's work was boosted by a highly successful performance in 1783 of his opera Die Entführung aus dem Serail, one of the first operas performed in the Estates Theatre. This performance encouraged the management of the Estates Theatre to mount a production of Le nozze di Figaro late in 1786, even though the opera had had only a mixed success at its premiere in Vienna in May 1786.

== Prague premiere of Figaro ==
Mozart's opera The Marriage of Figaro, which premiered in Vienna, was produced in late 1786 in Prague with tremendous success. The reviewer for the Prague newspaper Oberpostamtzeitung wrote "No piece (so everyone here asserts) has ever caused such a sensation as the Italian opera Die Hochzeit des Figaro, which has already been given several times here with unlimited applause." The orchestra and some affiliated music lovers funded a personal visit by Mozart so he could hear the production.

== Mozart's first visit to Prague and premiere of the "Prague" Symphony ==
Mozart first came to Prague on 11 January 1787 and stayed until the second week of February. He was feted everywhere. On 19 January a concert was organized for his financial benefit at which the "Prague" Symphony was given its first performance. Mozart also improvised a solo on the piano—including variations on the popular aria "Non più andrai" from The Marriage of Figaro. Afterward, Mozart said he "counted this day as one of the happiest of his life." Freeman points out that the level of adulation accorded Mozart on this occasion by the musical public of Prague was unprecedented for any eighteenth-century musician being recognized simultaneously as both a composer and a performer.

The great success of this visit generated a commission from the impresario Pasquale Bondini for another opera, which like The Marriage of Figaro was to have a libretto by Mozart's great collaborator Lorenzo Da Ponte.

== Mozart's second visit to Prague and premiere of Don Giovanni ==
Mozart came to Prague for the second time to help supervise the first performance of his opera Don Giovanni. He arrived on 4 October 1787 and stayed until 12 or 13 November. The premiere of the opera was supposed to have taken place on 15 October, but could not be arranged until 29 October 1787. The work was rapturously received; the Prager Oberpostamtzeitung reported, "Connoisseurs and musicians say that Prague has never heard the like," and "the opera ... is extremely difficult to perform."

== Mozart's third and fourth visits to Prague ==
En route to Berlin in the company of Prince Karl Lichnowsky, Mozart passed through Prague on 10 April 1789 and returned on his way back to Vienna on 31 May 1789 and stayed perhaps a day or two longer. For further details, see Mozart's Berlin journey.

== Mozart's fifth visit and premiere of La clemenza di Tito ==
Mozart wrote La clemenza di Tito for the festivities accompanying Leopold II's Prague coronation as king of Bohemia in September 1791. Mozart obtained this commission after Antonio Salieri had allegedly rejected it. Mozart arrived on 28 August 1791 and left in the third week of September. The opera received its first performance on 6 September 1791. Unlike the first two visits, Mozart was not the center of attention on his last visit. Rather, his activities were much overshadowed by the ceremonies of the Imperial court.

== Commemorations of Mozart's death in Prague ==
Mozart died in Vienna on 5 December 1791. The memorial service given in his honor in Prague (14 December 1791) was attended by thousands and featured a lavish Requiem mass performed by over a hundred musicians who accepted no pay for their efforts. Further commemorations were organized in subsequent years. Mozart had left little money for his family to live on, and his widow Constanze energetically found ways to make a living, including benefit concerts; these began with a concert held in Prague.

== Why did Mozart not stay? ==
After Don Giovanni, Mozart may have had a tentative offer to stay and write another opera for Prague, but he chose to return to Vienna. Maynard Solomon suggested that the reasons were first that Prague lacked the musical talent available in Vienna; in particular, the execution by the musicians of the Don Giovanni premiere was faulty and not up to the standard set in Vienna. In addition, a career like Mozart's depended on the support of the aristocracy, and Prague was only a provincial capital. There was no patron or musical institution in Prague in the late eighteenth century capable of offering satisfactory employment to a composer of Mozart's talents.

Freeman points out that the state of opera production in Prague was precarious throughout the eighteenth century. Indeed, productions of Italian opera in Prague ceased again already in 1789, not to re-appear again until 1791, due to the departure of the impresario Domenico Guardasoni and the death of the impresario Pasquale Bondini.

Another possible reason why Mozart didn't stay is given by Volkmar Braunbehrens, citing Schenk: the death in Vienna in November 1787 of Gluck, whose post in the Imperial musical establishment Mozart sought (and ultimately got, though at a much lower salary); Mozart needed to return home to lobby for the position. Freeman points out that the imperial appointment meant that Mozart would henceforth never live in any city other than Vienna. The prestige of such a position combined with the possibility of further employment and honors from the imperial court would have rendered any opportunities available in Prague unattractive in comparison.

== Prague audience ==
Freeman offers a detailed appraisal of the reasons for the success of Mozart's music in late eighteenth-century Prague The most important consideration is that the citizenry of Prague was likely the most musically literate of any in Europe. This was the result of a system of music education that arose in response to the area's history. Bohemia had participated in the Protestant Reformation, but was forcibly reconverted to Catholicism following the defeat of Bohemia by Austria during the Thirty Years' War. Part of this (successful) effort to reimpose Catholicism was a campaign to foster of Catholic church music. Music education for both boys and girls was offered as a normal part of elementary education throughout the kingdom of Bohemia, with the result that an unusually large proportion of the population was trained to sing or play instruments. The training was never intended to foster professional careers, rather to facilitate participation in religious services, however it did lead to many professional careers. Notably, there was a major emigration of Bohemian musicians (including some of Mozart's own colleagues) due to a surplus of musical talent within the country.

It was a theme of Mozart's career that his audiences found his work too complex and difficult. Freeman's suggestion is that among a population with such widespread musical training, there would have been a greater ability to appreciate new work, such as the Symphony No. 38 or Don Giovanni, that was musically sophisticated.

Mozart also had an unusual interest in composition for wind instruments. Bohemian wind players were famed all over Europe for their skills, thus his mastery of wind composition was much appreciated in Prague. The Prague press specifically attributed the success of the operas Die Entführung aus dem Serail and Le nozze di Figaro partially to their lavish and imaginative treatment of wind instruments. The extravagant writing for winds in the "Prague" Symphony may have been introduced deliberately to please the musical public of Prague.

== Commemorating Mozart in Prague today ==
Many tourists follow his tracks in Prague and visit the Mozart Museum of the reconstructed Villa Bertramka, where the composer stayed with his friends the Duscheks on visits to Prague. Mozart's visits to the Bertramka are actually very scantily documented. No contemporary observer ever reported seeing him there, and Mozart himself never reported staying there in any surviving correspondence from Prague. The best evidence that he stayed there (and only during his second visit to Prague) comes from his son Karl Thomas Mozart in a reminiscence of 1856. Carl Thomas was not present for the incident reported, rather only heard about it from friends of Mozart he met in Prague as a boy in the 1790s.

== Notes ==
=== Sources ===
- Braunbehrens, Volkmar (1990). Mozart in Vienna. New York: Grove Weidenfeld.
- Davenport, Marcia (1932). Mozart. New York: Charles Scribner's Sons – via Internet Archive. 1987 reprint ISBN 978-0-88029-124-8
- Freeman, Daniel E. (2021). Mozart in Prague. Minneapolis: Calumet Editions. ISBN 1950743500.
- Eisen, Cliff; Sadie, Stanley (2001). "Mozart, (Johann Chrysostom) Wolfgang Amadeus". Grove Music Online (8th ed.). Oxford University Press. doi:10.1093/gmo/9781561592630.article.6002278233. ISBN 978-1-56159-263-0. (subscription, Wikilibrary access, or UK public library membership required) (subscription required)
- Solomon, Maynard (1995). Mozart: A life. Harper Perennial. ISBN 0-06-092692-9.
