= Ah, lo previdi =

1777 soprano aria by W. A. Mozart

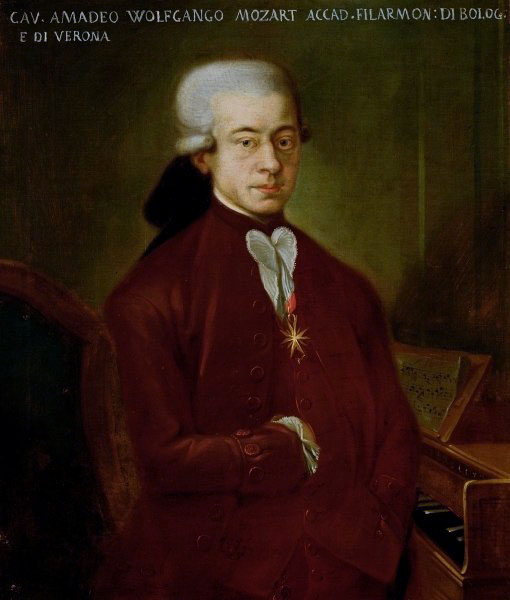
1777 portrait of Mozart

"Ah, lo previdi! ... Ah, t'invola ... Misera! ... Deh, non varcar", K. 272, is a concert aria by Wolfgang Amadeus Mozart for solo soprano and orchestra, one of Mozart's first large-scale operatic concert pieces.

== Description ==
Sung by the character Andromeda, this extensive concert aria takes around twelve to fourteen minutes to perform. Paul Corneilson points out that the piece is "virtually a solo cantata but without the strict divisions between recitative and aria; one emotional state follows close behind another". There are various tempo markings, including Allegro risoluto, Allegro, Andante, Adagio and Andantino, consisting of 323 bars, primarily in the key of C minor. The work calls for two oboes, two horns in E♭ and strings. The final cavatina "Deh, non varcar" features a lyrical accompaniment with the oboe, as Andromeda pleads for Perseus to wait for her in the afterlife.

=== Narrative ===
This operatic version tells of the myth of Andromeda, condemned to be sacrificed to a sea monster. However she is saved by the hero Perseus. She is obliged to marry Eurystheus, heir to the kingdom of Argos, but is in love with Perseus. In this aria Andromeda berates Eurystheus with an emotional fury at the apparent suicide of Perseus. She believes he failed to prevent Perseus's death. Andromeda then reflects to (the absent) Perseus with an intense grief. The recitative and aria ends in a gentle cavatina "Deh, non vacar", with a quiet ending in B-flat major. The passionate writing hints at later roles for operatic sopranos, such as Elektra in Idomeneo, The Queen of the Night in The Magic Flute and Donna Anna in Don Giovanni.

== History ==
Composed in Salzburg in August 1777, the aria was written for Josepha Duschek, for whom Mozart later wrote "Bella mia fiamma, addio", K528 in Prague. Mozart recommended "Ah, lo previdi!" to his beloved Aloysia Weber, writing "I advise you to observe the expression marks—to think carefully of the meaning and the impact of the words—to put yourself in all seriousness into Andromeda's situation and position!—and to imagine that you really are that very person." The aria was published by Breitkopf & Härtel in 1888. The original manuscript is housed in the Berlin State Library.

== Text ==
The text is by Vittorio Amedeo Cigna-Santi, taken from the 1772 opera Andromeda, probably composed by Giovanni Paisiello.

Andromeda
Recitativo
Ah, lo previdi!
Povero Prence, con quel ferro istesso
che me salvò, ti lacerasti il petto.

(ad Eristeo)
Ma tu sì fiero scempio perchè non impedir?
Come, o crudele, d'un misero a pietà
non ti movesti?
Qual tigre, qual tigre ti nodrì?
Dove, dove, dove nascesti?

Aria
Ah, t'invola agl'occhi miei,
alma vile, ingrato cor!
La cagione, oh Dio, tu sei
del mio barbaro, barbaro dolor.
Va, crudele! Va, spietato!
Va, tra le fiere ad abitar.

(Eristeo parte)
Recitativo
Misera! Misera! Invan m'adiro,
e nel suo sangue intanto
nuota già l'idol mio.
Con quell'acciaro, ah Perseo, che facesti?
Mi salvasti poc'anzi, or m'uccidesti.

Col sangue, ahi, la bell'alma,
ecco, già uscì dallo squarciato seno.
Me infelice!
Si oscura il giorno agli occhi miei,
e nel barbaro affanno il cor vien meno.

Ah, non partir, ombra diletta,
io voglio unirmi a te.
Sul grado estremo,
intanto che m'uccide il dolor,
intanto fermati, fermati alquanto!

Cavatina
Deh, non varcar quell'onda,
anima del cor mio.
Di Lete all'altra sponda,
ombra, compagna anch'io
voglio venir, venir con te.

Ah, I foresaw this!
With your sword, unhappy Prince you saved me
but took your own life

(to Eristeo)
Why did you not prevent this terrible deed?
Cruel man, not given to pity
What tiger gave you suck?
Where did you come from?
Be gone from my sight!

Flee from my site
You base spirit, unkind heart!
By heaven
You are the cause of this barbaric suffering
The most cruel and ruthless
Go and live amongst the wildest beasts

(Eristeo exits)

Unhappiness is me!
I rage in vain
My beloved lies in a pool of his own blood
Why, Perseus did you do this?
Darkness falls, my heart grows faint.

With painful blood
This beautiful soul is taken
Unhappy me
The day is darkening before me
With a failing heart of torment

Depart not my beloved!
I will be with you
At the end pause
And I will be with you
While sorrow ends my life

Do not cross that stream
Soul of my own soul
To the furthest shore of Lethe
I will be your companion forever, stay!
Forever I will be with you.
