= Bella mia fiamma, addio =

1787 concert aria by W. A. Mozart

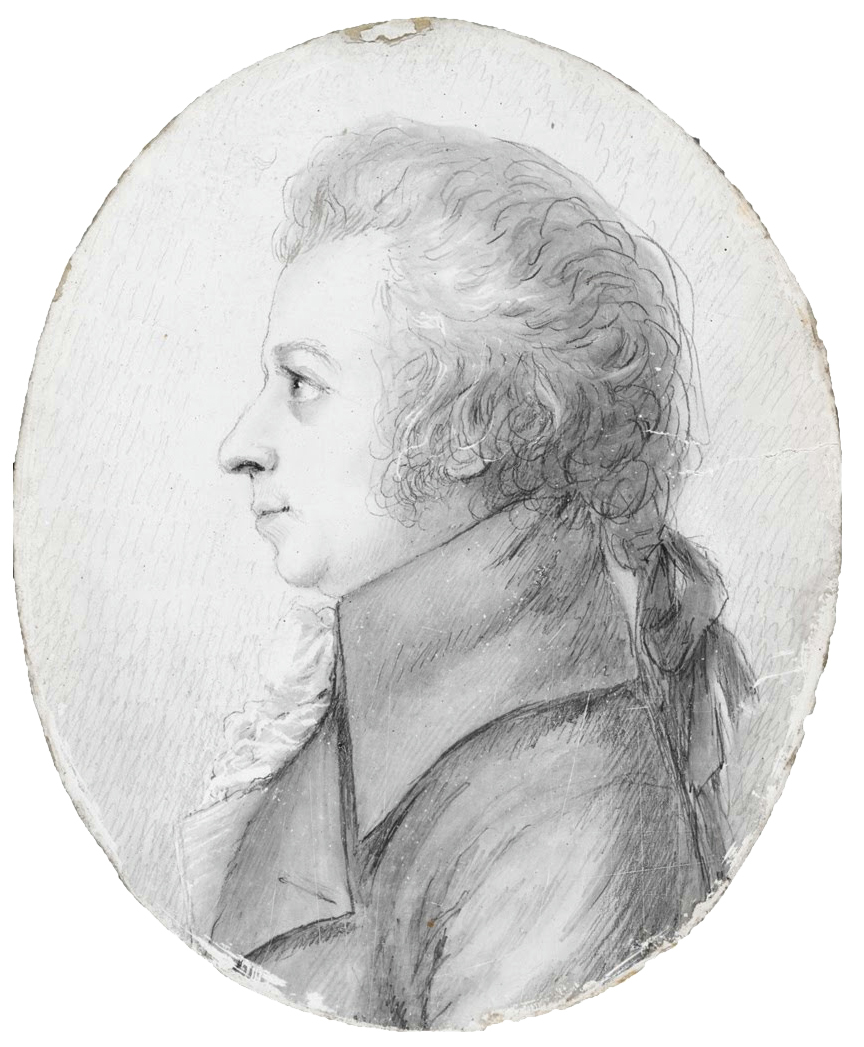
Stock's 1789 miniature of Mozart

"Bella mia fiamma, addio", K. 528, is a concert aria by Wolfgang Amadeus Mozart for solo soprano and orchestra, composed in Prague in 1787. The text of this aria is taken from the 1772 opera Cerere placata, composed by Niccolò Jommelli with text by Michele Sarcone. The aria was published by Breitkopf & Härtel in 1881.

== Description ==
Sung by the character Titano, the aria is marked andante, then allegro, and consists of 196 bars in the key of C major. The vocal range reaches from D_{4} to A_{5} with a tessitura of D_{4} to G_{5}. A typical performance lasts for around ten minutes. The aria contains bravura writing with difficult chromatic passages. The aria part of the work calls for a flute, two oboes, two bassoons, two natural horns in C, and strings. The time signature for the introduction is common time, then for the aria proper 3/4 triple metre.

== History ==
Composed in Prague, dated 3 November 1787, the aria was dedicated to its original singer, Josepha Duschek, for whom Mozart previously wrote the aria "Ah, lo previdi", K. 272, in Salzburg. The composition of this aria was somewhat unusual; the following tale is attributed to Mozart's son Karl Thomas:

Petranka [sic] is well-known as the villa in which Mozart enjoyed staying with his musician friends, the Duscheks, during his visit to Prague, and where he composed several numbers for his Don Juan [Don Giovanni]. On the summit of a hill near the villa stands a pavilion. In it, one day, Frau Duschek slyly imprisoned the great Mozart, after having provided ink, pen, and notepaper, and told him that he was not to regain his freedom until he had written an aria he had promised her to the words bella mia fiamma addio. Mozart submitted himself to the necessary; but to avenge himself for the trick Frau Duschek had played on him, he used various difficult-to-sing passages in the aria, and threatened his despotic friend that he would immediately destroy the aria if she could not succeed in performing it at sight without mistakes.

Librarian Bernard Wilson, commenting on the story, adds: "There seems to be some corroboration of this account in the aria itself. The words Quest' affano, questo passo è terribile per me (mm. 27–34) are set to an awesome tangle of chromatic sequences artfully calculated to test the singer's sense of intonation and powers of interpretation. Apparently Mme. Duschek survived the passo terribile, since the autograph bears her name in Mozart's hand." In 1789, Duschek sang the work along with other arias at concerts given by Mozart in Dresden and Leipzig during his Berlin journey of that year.

== Text ==
Score (15 pages)

Recitativo
Bella mia fiamma, addio!
Non piacque al cielo di renderci felici.
Ecco reciso, prima d'esser compito,
quel purissimo nodo, che strinsero
fra lor gl'animi nostri con il solo voler.
Vivi: Cedi al destin, cedi al dovere.

Della giurata fede la mia morte t'assolve.
A più degno consorte ... O pene!
unita vivi più lieta e più felice vita.
Ricordati di me, ma non mai turbi
d'un felice sposo la rara
rimembranza il tuo riposo.
Regina, io vado ad ubbidirti
Ah, tutto finisca il mio furor col morir mio.
Cerere, Alfeo, diletta sposa, addio!

Aria
(to Proserpina): Resta, o cara, acerba morte
mi separa, Oh Dio ... da te!

(to Cerere): Prendi cura di sua sorte,
consolarla almen procura.

(to Alfeo): Vado ... ahi lasso!
Addio, addio per sempre.

Quest'affanno, questo passo
è terribile per me.
Ah! Dov'è il tempio, dov'è l'ara?

(To Cerere): Vieni, affretta la vendetta!
Questa vita così amara
più soffribile non è!

(To Proserpina): Oh cara, addio per sempre!

Light of my life farewell!
Heaven has not planned for our happiness.
Those pure strands were snapped
before out knot of happiness could be bound
by our spirit in a single will.
Live, and submit to fate and your duty.

My death absolves you from your promises.
United to a better partner (Oh grief!)
You will have a better, happier life.
Remember me,
but do not be disturbed
by thoughts of unhappy former lover.
My Queen, I leave you
and death will end my ravings.
Ceres, Alpheus, beloved heart, goodbye.

Stay my beloved
A cruel death takes me from you, Oh God!

Look after her
Comfort her.

I go, alas, farewell
farewell forever.

This distressing situation
is hard to bear.
Where is the temple, where is the altar?

Come revenge, be quick
This bitter life
Can be borne no longer.

Goodbye forever!
