= František Xaver Dušek =

Czech composer, pianist and harpsichordist (1731–1799)

František Xaver Dušek (German: Franz Xaver Duschek or Dussek); 8 December 1731 – 12 February 1799) was a Czech composer and musician. He was one of the most important harpsichordists and pianists of his time.

== Biography ==
Dušek was born in Chotěborky in the Kingdom of Bohemia (today part of Vilantice, Czech Republic). He was taught the harpsichord in Vienna by Georg Christoph Wagenseil and established himself around 1770 in Prague as a successful keyboard teacher. Wolfgang Amadeus Mozart was probably his guest in his Bertramka villa in Košíře, just outside Prague, although no documentation exists to support claims originating in nineteenth-century literature that he stayed there frequently. Mozart himself never reported staying there and no contemporary witness ever reported seeing him there. The best evidence that he ever stayed there comes from a reminiscence of Mozart's son Karl Thomas Mozart that dates from 1856 and indicates that he was at the Bertramka during his second visit to Prague (during October and November 1787). Karl Thomas was not himself a witness to the incident reported, rather he only heard about it from friends of Mozart whom he met as a child in Prague during the 1790s. Furthermore, there is no documentation to support widespread claims that Mozart completed the operas Don Giovanni and La clemenza di Tito at the Bertramka, or indeed that he even worked on them there. Dušek died in Prague. He was a teacher of Mozart's son Karl Thomas, who became a gifted pianist, although he did not pursue a career in music.

Dušek's wife Josepha Hambacher (1753–1824) had been taught by him and was a famous pianist and soprano. She sang important soprano roles in Mozart operas in early performances, and Mozart's concert aria "Bella mia fiamma" (K. 528) was written for her.

Dušek composed sonatas, variations and concertos for harpsichord and piano and several symphonies and string quartets. Much of his music is in the galant style of the early Classical period.

Dušek is buried at Malá Strana Cemetery in Prague, together with his wife.

== Tributes by other composers ==
The Austrian-Australian composer Eric Gross (1926–2011) wrote three suites for violin and orchestra, named Dussekiana I-III, based on piano pieces of František Xaver Dussek.

== List of compositions ==
Catalogue established by Václav Jan Sýkora.

- S 1: Keyboard Sonata in B♭ major
- S 2: Keyboard Sonata in B♭ major
- S 3: Keyboard Sonata in E♭ major
- S 4: Keyboard Sonata in G major
- S 5: 6 Keyboard Sonatinas
- S 6: Keyboard Sonata in G major
- S 7: Keyboard Sonata in G major
- S 8: Keyboard Sonata in C major
- S 9: Variations for keyboard in C major
- S 10: Andante con menuetto for keyboard in G major
- S 11: Pieces for keyboard
- S 12: Keyboard Sonata in E♭ major
- S 13: Keyboard Sonata in F major
- S 14: Keyboard Sonata in C major
- S 15: Keyboard Sonata in A major
- S 16: Keyboard Sonata in G major
- S 17: Keyboard Sonata in F major
- S 18: Keyboard Sonata in G major
- S 19: Keyboard Sonata in D major
- S 20: Variations for keyboard in G major
- S 21: Variations for keyboard in A major
- S 22: Variations for keyboard in B♭ major
- S 23: Variations for keyboard 4 hands in C major
- S 24: Menuetto for keyboard 4 hands in C major
- S 25: Sonata for keyboard 4 hands in C major
- S 26: Sonata for keyboard 4 hands in E♭ major
- S 27: Sonata for keyboard 4 hands in G major
- S 28: Sonata for keyboard 4 hands in C major
- S 29: Sonata for keyboard 4 hands in C major
- S 30: Sonata for keyboard 4 hands in G major
- S 31: Variations for keyboard 4 hands in E♭ major
- S 32: Keyboard Trio in F major
- S 33: Keyboard Trio in G major
- S 34: Keyboard Trio in D major
- S 35: Keyboard Quintet in G major
- S 36: Keyboard Trio in E♭ major
- S 37: Keyboard Quartet in G major
- S 38: Keyboard Concerto in G major
- S 39: Keyboard Concerto in C major
- S 40: Keyboard Concerto in E♭ major
- S 41: Keyboard Concerto in D major
- S 42: Adagio for keyboard & orchestra in B♭ major
- S 43: Partita for 2 oboes & bassoon in G major
- S 44: Partita for 2 oboes & bassoon in F major
- S 45: Partita for 2 oboes & bassoon in G major
- S 46: Partita for 2 oboes & bassoon in C major
- S 47: Partita for 2 oboes & bassoon in C major
- S 48: Partita for wind quintet in F major
- S 49: Partita for wind quintet in D minor
- S 50: Partita for wind quintet in A major
- S 51: Partita for wind quintet in F major
- S 52: Partita for wind quintet in G major
- S 53: Partita for wind quintet in F major
- S 54: Partita for wind sextet in G major
- S 55: Partita for wind sextet in F major
- S 56: Partita for wind sextet in B♭ major
- S 57: Partita for wind sextet in F major
- S 58: Partita for wind sextet in G major
- S 59: Partita for wind sextet in D major
- S 60: Partita for wind sextet in F major
- S 61: Partita for wind sextet in F major
- S 62: Partita for wind sextet in F major
- S 63: Partita for wind sextet in C major
- S 64: Partita for wind sextet in F major
- S 65: Partita for wind sextet in D major
- S 66: Partita for wind sextet in F major
- S 67: Partita for wind sextet in D major
- S 68: Partita for wind sextet in A major
- S 69: Partita for wind sextet in D major
- S 70: Partita for wind sextet in F major
- S 71: Partita for wind sextet in D major
- S 72: Partita for wind sextet in F major
- S 73: Partita for wind sextet in D major
- S 74: Partita for wind sextet in B♭ major
- S 75: Partita for wind sextet in B♭ major
- S 76: Partita for wind sextet in F major
- S 77: Partita for wind sextet in D major
- S 78: Partita for wind sextet in A major
- S 79: Partita for wind sextet in F major
- S 80: Partita for wind sextet in B♭ major
- S 81: Partita for wind sextet in F major
- S 82: Partita for wind sextet in A major
- S 83: Partita for wind sextet in C major
- S 84: Partita for wind sextet in F major
- S 85: Partita for wind sextet in B♭ major
- S 86: Partita for wind sextet in A major
- S 87: Partita for wind sextet in C major
- S 88: Partita for wind sextet in F major
- S 89: Partita for wind sextet in B♭ major
- S 90: Trio for 2 violins & continuo in C major
- S 91: Trio for 2 violins & continuo in D major
- S 92: Trio for 2 violins & continuo in E♭ major
- S 93: Trio for 2 violins & continuo in B♭ major
- S 94: Trio for 2 violins & continuo in A major
- S 95: Trio for 2 violins & continuo in G major
- S 96: Trio for 2 violins & continuo in A major
- S 97: Trio for 2 violins & continuo in B♭ major
- S 98: Divertimento a 3 in D major
- S 99: Divertimento a 3 in A major
- S 100: Divertimento a 3 in B♭ major
- S 101: Divertimento a 3 in A major
- S 102: Divertimento a 3 in E major
- S 103: Divertimento a 3 in E♭ major
- S 104: Divertimento a 3 in B♭ major
- S 105: Divertimento a 3 in E major
- S 106: Divertimento a 3 in G major
- S 107: Divertimento a 3 in C major
- S 108: Divertimento a 3 in E♭ major
- S 109: Divertimento a 3 in B♭ major
- S 110: Divertimento a 3 in A major
- S 111: Noturno for 2 violins & continuo in A minor
- S 112: Serenata a 3 in A major
- S 113: Divertimento a 4 in A major
- S 114: Divertimento a 4 in E major
- S 115: Divertimento a 4 in B♭ major
- S 116: Divertimento a 4 in B♭ major
- S 117: Divertimento a 4 in C major
- S 118: Divertimento a 4 in A major
- S 119: Divertimento a 4 in B♭ major
- S 120: Divertimento a 4 in A major
- S 121: Divertimento a 4 in A major
- S 122: Divertimento a 4 in A major
- S 123: Divertimento a 4 in C major
- S 124: Divertimento a 4 in A major
- S 125: Divertimento a 4 in E♭ major
- S 126: Quadro in G major
- S 127: Quadro in A major
- S 128: Quadro in E major
- S 129: Quadro in G major
- S 130: Quadro in B♭ major
- S 131: Quadro in B♭ major
- S 132: Quadro in E major
- S 133: Serenata a 4 in C major
- S 134: Serenade in E♭ major
- S 135: Divertimento a 5 in D major
- S 136: Divertimento a 5 in E♭ major
- S 137: Serenade in F major
- S 138: Serenade in D major
- S 139: Symphony in E♭ major (Altner Es 6)
- S 140: Symphony in F major (Altner F 8)
- S 141: Symphony in G major (Altner G 1)
- S 142: Symphony in D major (Altner D 4)
- S 143: Symphony in F major (Altner F 1)
- S 144: Symphony in B♭ major (Altner B 1)
- S 145: Symphony in E major (Altner E 1)
- S 146: Symphony in D major (Altner D 5)
- S 147: Symphony in F major (Altner F 2)
- S 148: Symphony in C major (Altner C 1)
- S 149: Symphony in D major (Altner D 6)
- S 150: Symphony in E♭ major (Altner Es 1)
- S 151: Symphony in G major (Altner G 4)
- S 152: Symphony in F major (Altner F 3)
- S 153: Symphony in D major (Altner D 7)
- S 154: Symphony in D major (Altner D 8)
- S 155: Symphony in D major (Altner D 9)
- S 156: Symphony in B♭ major (Altner B 5)
- S 157: Symphony in E♭ major (Altner Es 2)
- S 158: Symphony in D major (Altner D10)
- S 159: Symphony in F major (Altner F 7)
- S 160: Symphony in G major (Altner G 3)
- S 161: Symphony in A major (Altner A 3)
- S 162: Symphony in E♭ major (Altner Es 5)
- S 163: Symphony in A major (Altner A 1)
- S 164: Symphony in C major (Altner C 2)
- S 165: Symphony in D major (Altner D 2)
- S 166: Symphony in F major (Altner F 6)
- S 167: Symphony in D major (Altner D 1)
- S 168: Symphony in G major (Altner G 2)
- S 169: Symphony in E♭ major (Altner Es 4)
- S 170: Symphony in D major (Altner D11)
- S 171: Symphony in B♭ major (Altner B 3)
- S 172: Symphony in F major (Altner F 4)
- S 173: Symphony in A major (Altner A 2)
- S 174: Symphony in E♭ major (Altner Es 3)
- S 175: Symphony in D major (Altner D 3)
- S 176: Symphony in B♭ major (Altner B 2)
- S 177: Symphony in F major (Altner F 5)
- S 178: Symphony in B♭ major (Altner B 4)
- S 179: 13 Menuets
- S 180: March in D major
- S 181: Kurze Anweisung für das Violoncello (lost)
- S 182: Lieder für Kinder und Kinderfreunde
- S 183: Mass in G major
- S 184: Mass in C major
- S 185: Requiem in E♭ major
- S 186: Pange lingua in C major
- S 187: Cantilena funeralis in B♭ major
- S 188: Missa pastoralis in D major
- S 189: Missa de Nativitate in D major (lost)
- S 190: Pastorella in G major
- S 191: 2 sacred arias for bass
- S 192: Offertorium in C major
- S 193: Pange lingua in D major
- S 194: Te Deum in D major
- S 195: Keyboard Sonata in D major (Antonio Duschek)
- S 196: Violin Concerto in D major (lost) (Benjamin Duschek)
- S 197: Violin Concerto in A major (lost) (Benjamin Duschek)
- S 198: Keyboard Sonata in F major (F.F. Dussek)
- S 199: Serenade in E♭ major (F. Duseck)
- S 200: Moses in Egypten (lost) (Franz Dussek)
- S 201: Sonata for keyboard & violin (lost) (Franz Dussek)
- S 202: Notturno for 3 flutes (lost) (Franz Joseph Dussek)
- S deest: Symphony in A major (Altner A 4) (lost)

== Recordings ==
- Piano Concertos - In D Major / In E Flat Major, Jan Novotný Piano, Pardubice State Chamber Orchestra, dir. Libor Pešek, Supraphon, 1982
- Three Sinfonias, Helios 18, dir. Marie-Louise Oschatz, Naxos 8.555878, 2001
- Concertos For Piano And Orchestra, Prague Chamber Orchestra, dir. Karel Košárek, Etcetera Records - KTC 1369, 2008
- Four Symphonies, Helsinki Baroque Orchestra, dir. Aapo Häkkinen, Naxos – 8.572683, 2012
- F.X. Dušek: Complete Music for Fortepiano, Marius Bartoccini Fortepiano & Harpsichord, Brilliant Classics 95863, 2021

== Bibliography ==
- Freeman, Daniel E. Mozart in Prague. Minneapolis: Calumet Editions, 2021. ISBN 978-1-950743-50-6
