= Symphony No. 38 (Mozart) =

1786 symphony by W. A. Mozart

- Prague
- by W. A. Mozart
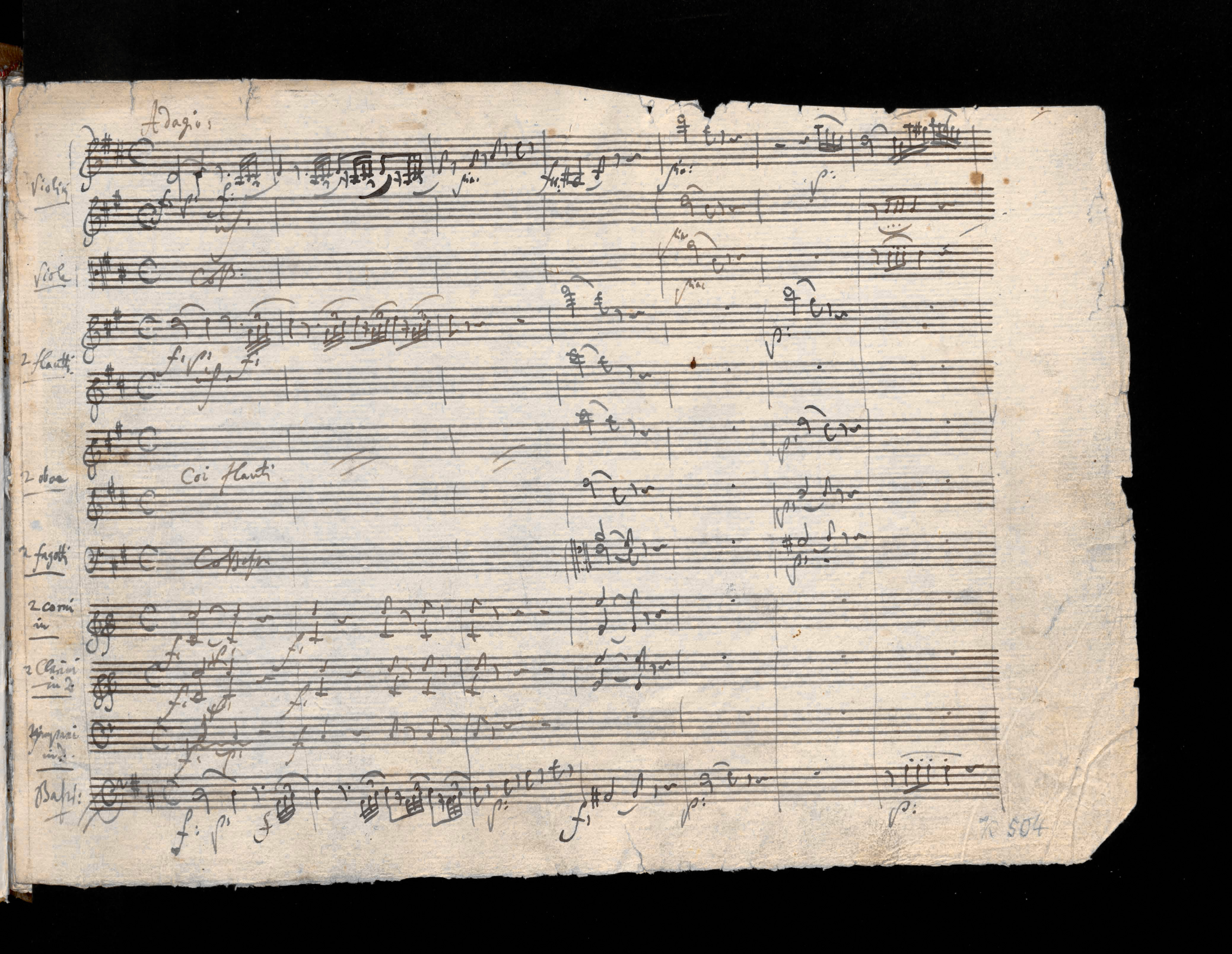
- First page of the autograph manuscript
- Key: D major
- Catalogue: K. 504
- Composed: 1786
- Published: 1800
- Publisher: Johann Anton André
- Movements: 3

Premiere
- Date: 19 January 1787
- Location: Prague
- Conductor: Wolfgang Amadeus Mozart

The Symphony No. 38 in D major, K. 504, was composed by Wolfgang Amadeus Mozart in late 1786. It premiered in Prague on 19 January 1787, during Mozart's first visit to the city. Because it was first performed in Prague, it is often called the Prague Symphony. Mozart's autograph thematic catalogue records 6 December 1786 as the date of completion.

Other works written by Mozart roughly contemporary with this symphony include the Piano Trio in B♭, K. 502 (completed 18 November 1786), the Piano Concerto No. 25, K. 503 (completed 4 December 1786), and the scena and rondò concert aria Ch'io mi scordi di te?, K. 505, for soprano and orchestra (completed 26 December 1786).

== Prague ==
Although Mozart's popularity among the Viennese waxed and waned, he was consistently popular among the Bohemians and had a devoted following in Prague. In spite of the fact that the Symphony No. 38 was first performed in Prague, it is not certain that it was actually written for Prague. Much of the confusion surrounds the chronology of its inception. It is clear that Mozart was invited to Prague on the strength of the reception of his opera Le nozze di Figaro during the 1786–87 winter season of the National Theatre (now called the Estates Theatre) in Prague. It is not known, however, when the run started, possibly in November 1786, possibly in December. No mention of the overwhelming success of Le nozze di Figaro is recorded in the Prague press until December 11, 1786, five days after the symphony was completed. It is certain that the opera's run began before that week, but there is no documentation to confirm when. It is known from a letter of Leopold Mozart written in January 1787 that Mozart was invited to Prague by a group of musicians and patrons. It is possible that this invitation came through long before Le nozze di Figaro was actually performed in Prague, perhaps during the time of rehearsals, when the brilliance of the music would have been recognized already by the musicians playing it. It is also possible that the Prague Symphony was intended to be performed for the Advent instrumental concerts given in Vienna in December 1786 along with the Piano Concerto No. 25, but all that can be established for certain is that it was not performed in Vienna before it was performed in Prague.

The lavish use of wind instruments might offer a clue that the Prague Symphony was fashioned specifically with the Prague public in mind. The wind players of Bohemia were famed throughout Europe, and the Prague press specifically attributed the great success of the operas Die Entführung aus dem Serail and Le nozze di Figaro partially to their skillful deployment of wind instruments. It is also possible that the extensive use of winds in the Prague Symphony was simply the result of experiments with orchestration that Mozart had been cultivating in the orchestral accompaniments for his piano concertos for the previous two years and the new experience he had of writing for winds would have shown up in his symphonies regardless. No matter, the use of wind instruments in the Prague Symphony represents a major advance in Mozart's symphonic technique that was continued and developed in his last symphonies, and also adopted by the London symphonies of Haydn (who himself was a major influence on Mozart), Beethoven, and Schubert. Indeed, it would be difficult to identify any earlier symphony by any composer not of a special type that contains so many passages in which no stringed instruments play at all, only various types of wind ensembles.

== Order of composition of the movements: Tyson's conjecture ==
In his program of identifying the paper types of Mozart autographs, Alan Tyson found that the third movement was actually composed first: its paper matches paper on which Mozart composed Le Nozze di Figaro earlier in 1786, whereas the first two movements were written on paper matching other work from late in the same year. A further fact Tyson noted was that Mozart had made a copy of a trumpet part for his earlier D-major symphony, now called the "Paris Symphony" (see Symphony No. 31 (Mozart)). This copy is also on the late-December paper type. Tyson diffidently connects these facts with the following conjecture: Mozart had intended to take the Paris Symphony with him for performance in Prague, and made a copy of a trumpet part that had gone missing. He then felt he ought to replace the third movement and wrote a new finale for the Paris Symphony (in D major, to match). This ultimately served as the finale of the Prague Symphony -- in the end, Mozart decided it was best to write a completely new symphony for Prague, and composed (using the December paper type) the first and second movements. Tyson also suggests that Mozart wrote no minuet movement because he ran out of time; though see below for a different explanation.

== Form ==
External audio
- Performance of Symphony No. 38 in D major, K. 504 ("Prague") by Otto Klemperer and the Philharmonia Orchestra in 1960, via Internet Archive

The early classical symphonies of the eighteenth century were originally cast in three movements (fast–slow–fast) following their origins in Italian overtures. Then, starting in the 1750s, it was normal in Germany and Austria to include a minuet to create the format fast–slow–minuet–fast. The Prague Symphony has no minuet, however, something that would have been extraordinarily unusual for a symphony written in Vienna in the late 1780s. Mozart himself, who wrote many more symphonies in the old-fashioned fast–slow–fast format than Haydn did (because of his closer connections with Italy), never before wrote a three-movement symphony for Vienna, not even as a child in the 1760s, when three-movement symphonies were still common in many parts of Europe. Daniel E. Freeman has suggested that the three-movement format might have been chosen as a means to appeal to the musical public of Prague. It so happens that the only symphonist from Prague that Mozart ever knew well was Josef Mysliveček, a close associate of the Mozart family between 1770 and 1778. As it happens, almost all of Mysliveček's symphonies are cast in the three-movement pattern favored in Italy, where he mainly worked throughout his adult life. Nonetheless, a definitive explanation for the three-movement format of the Prague Symphony is still lacking.

The Prague Symphony is scored for two flutes, two oboes, two bassoons, two horns, two trumpets, timpani, and strings.

It has three movements, each in sonata form:

1. Adagio – Allegro, 4/4
2. Andante in G major, 6/8
3. Finale (Presto), 2/4

The first movement begins with a slow introduction (Mozart does this in only two other symphonies, No. 36 ["Linz"] and No. 39). Freeman has noted that it is probably the longest and most sophisticated slow introduction written for any major symphony up to that time, perhaps to compensate for the length of the missing minuet in order to help bring the entire work into closer alignment with the customary length of a standard four-movement symphony. The introduction gives way to the main portion of the movement, in which six melodies are developed and recapitulated in a very contrapuntal example of sonata-allegro form. Certain phrases in the first movement bear a resemblance to the overture to Die Zauberflöte. The allegro proper opens in a complicated manner with the "first theme" traded off between the second violins (who start it) and the first violins (who finish it).

The second movement's structure is typical of Mozart symphonies dating from this period, although the music shifts to a minor key in a movement of contrasting moods. It is in the subdominant key of G major.

The third movement is a lively Presto in which the flute plays a prominent role, especially in counterpointing the main melody in the development section. This movement "shows Mozart in an unusual mood, nearer to Beethoven's boisterousness than his fastidious taste normally allowed him to go."

== Notes ==
Sources

- Deutsch, Otto Erich (1965). Mozart: A Documentary Biography. Translated by Eric Blom; Peter Branscombe; Jeremy Noble. Stanford, California: Stanford University Press – via Internet Archive.
- Freeman, Daniel E. (2021). Mozart in Prague. Minneapolis: Calumet Editions. ISBN 978-1-950743-50-6.
