= Jitka Snížková =

Jitka Snížková born Skrhova (1924–1989) was a Czech composer, music educator and musicologist. She studied composition with Alois Haba at the Prague Conservatory and later taught music theory at the same institution. Her creative output includes piano, chamber, orchestral, choral, and vocal compositions. As the President of the Mozart Society, an organization that owned Bertramka, she was pressured into donating the property to the National Committee of Prague in 1986. Bertramka was the villa where Wolfgang Amadeus Mozart stayed while he was in Prague and where he completed his opera Don Giovanni. After Snizkova's sudden death, the Mozart Society contested the donation.

== Compositions ==
For a near complete list of works refer to this database of Czech women composers

== Published research ==
Snizkova also specialized in research in medieval and Renaissance music from Czech archives, and edited several collections of this music including:

- Book of Minuets from Kutná Hora, Kutnohorská knížka menuetů, ed. by Jitka Snížková
