= Aria =

Musical piece for a single voice as part of a larger work

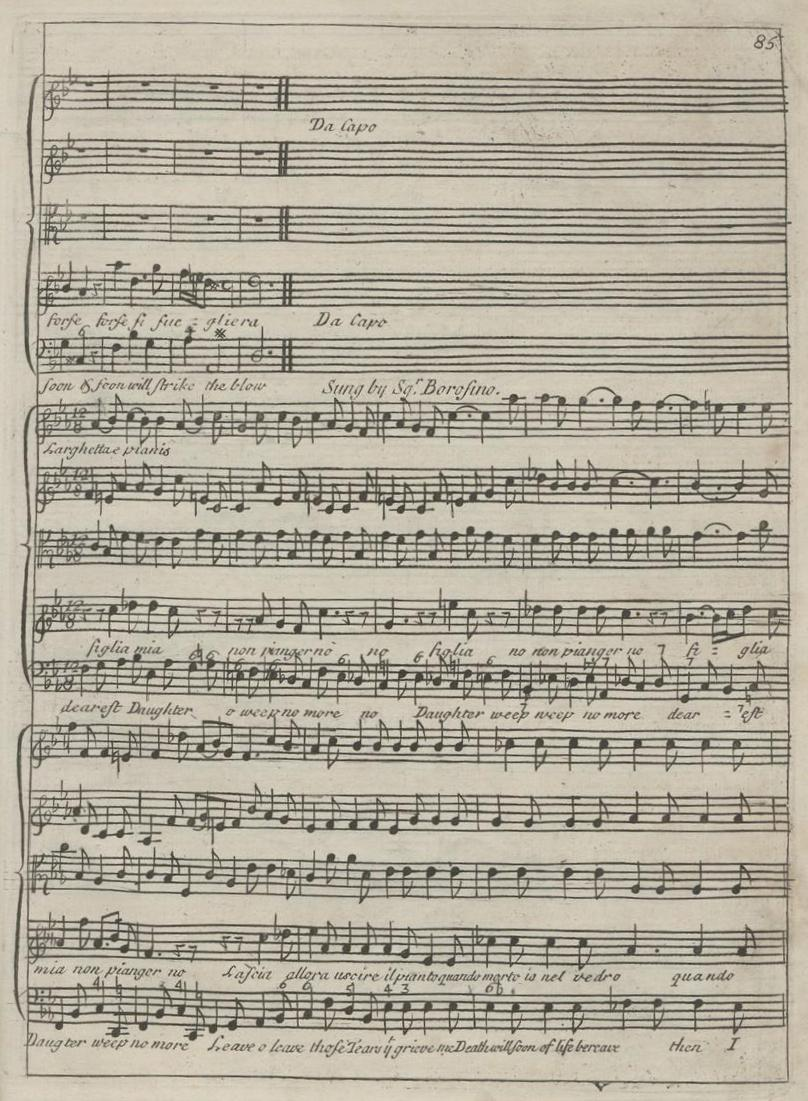
The farewell aria of Sultan Bajazet in Handel's opera Tamerlano (note the da capo instruction). First edition, London, 1719.

In music, an aria (/ˈɑːriə/, Italian: [ˈaːrja]; pl.: arie, Italian: [ˈaːrje]; arias in common usage; diminutive form: arietta, Italian: [aˈrjetta]; pl.: ariette; in English simply air) is a self-contained piece for one voice, with or without instrumental or orchestral accompaniment, normally part of a larger work.

The typical context for arias is opera, but vocal arias also feature in oratorios and cantatas, or they can be stand-alone concert arias. The term was originally used to refer to any expressive melody, usually, but not always, performed by a singer.

== Etymology ==
The Italian term aria, which derives from the Greek ἀήρ and Latin aer (air), first appeared in relation to music in the 14th century when it simply signified a manner or style of singing or playing. By the end of the 16th century, the term 'aria' refers to an instrumental form (cf. Santino Garsi da Parma lute works, ('Aria del Gran Duca'). By the early 16th century, it was in common use as meaning a simple setting of strophic poetry; melodic madrigals, free of complex polyphony, were known as madrigale arioso.

== In opera ==
=== Aria form in late 17th century French and Italian opera ===
In the context of staged works and concert works, arias evolved from simple melodies into structured forms. In such works, the sung, melodic, and structured aria differed from the speech-like (parlando) recitative – the latter tending to carry the story-line, the former used to convey emotional content and serve as an opportunity for singers to display their vocal talent.

By the late 17th century, operatic arias came to be written in one of two forms. Binary form arias were in two sections (A–B); arias in ternary form (A–B–A) were known as da capo arias (literally 'from the head', i.e. with the opening section repeated, often in a highly decorated manner). In the da capo aria, the 'B' episode would typically be in a different key – the dominant or relative major key. Other variants of these forms are found in the French operas of the late 17th century such as those of Jean-Baptiste Lully which dominated the period of the French baroque. Vocal solos in his operas (known of course as the French term, airs) are frequently in extended binary form (ABB') or sometimes in rondeau form (ABACA), (a shape which is analogous to the instrumental rondo).

In the work of Italian composers of the late 17th and early 18th century, the da capo aria came to be include the ritornello (literally, 'little return'), a recurring instrumental episode which featured certain phrases of the aria proper and provided, in early operas, the opportunity for dancing or entries of characters. Da capo aria with ritornelli became a typifying feature of European opera throughout the 18th century and is thought by some writers to be a direct antecedent of sonata form. The ritornelli became essential to the structure of the aria – "while the words determine the character of a melody the ritornello instruments often decided in what terms it shall be presented."

=== The French baroque ariette and air ===
In contrast to its name, the ariette of the French baroque opera, especially in the works of Campra, Rameau and their contemporaries is a fully developed da capo aria much longer than their contemporary airs. The ariette came as an influence of the aria of the Italian opera seria into French music; they have a rich instrumental accompaniment, an instrumental exposition of the theme and virtuosic melodic writing. They are usually placed standalone in divertissements as they do not advance the action, rather they are celebrations of joy or triumph. Conversely, in the operas of Lully and his successors, airs or airs tendres are tiny melodic passages of a few bars, usually in binary form, inserted seamlessly into the recitative.

=== 18th century ===
By the early 18th century, composers such as Alessandro Scarlatti had established the aria form, and especially its da capo version with ritornelli, as the key element of opera seria. "It offered balance and continuity, and yet gave scope for contrast. [...] The very regularity of its conventional features enabled deviations from the normal to be exploited with telling effect." In the early years of the century, arias in the Italian style began to take over in French opera, giving rise eventually to the French genre of ariette, normally in a relatively simple ternary form.

Types of operatic aria became known by a variety of terms according to their character – e.g.aria parlante ('speaking-style', narrative in nature), aria di bravura (typically given to a heroine), aria buffa (aria of a comic type, typically given to a bass or bass-baritone), and so on.

M. F. Robinson describes the standard aria in opera seria in the period 1720 to 1760 as follows:

The first section normally began with an orchestral ritornello after which the singer entered and sang the words of the first stanza in their entirety. By the end of this first vocal paragraph the music, if it were in a major key as it usually was, had modulated to the dominant. The orchestra then played a second ritornello usually shorter than the first. The singer re-entered and sang the same words through a second time. The music of this second paragraph was often slightly more elaborate than that of the first. There were more repeats of words and perhaps more florid vocalisations. The key worked its way back to the tonic for the final vocal cadence after which the orchestra rounded the section off with a final ritornello.

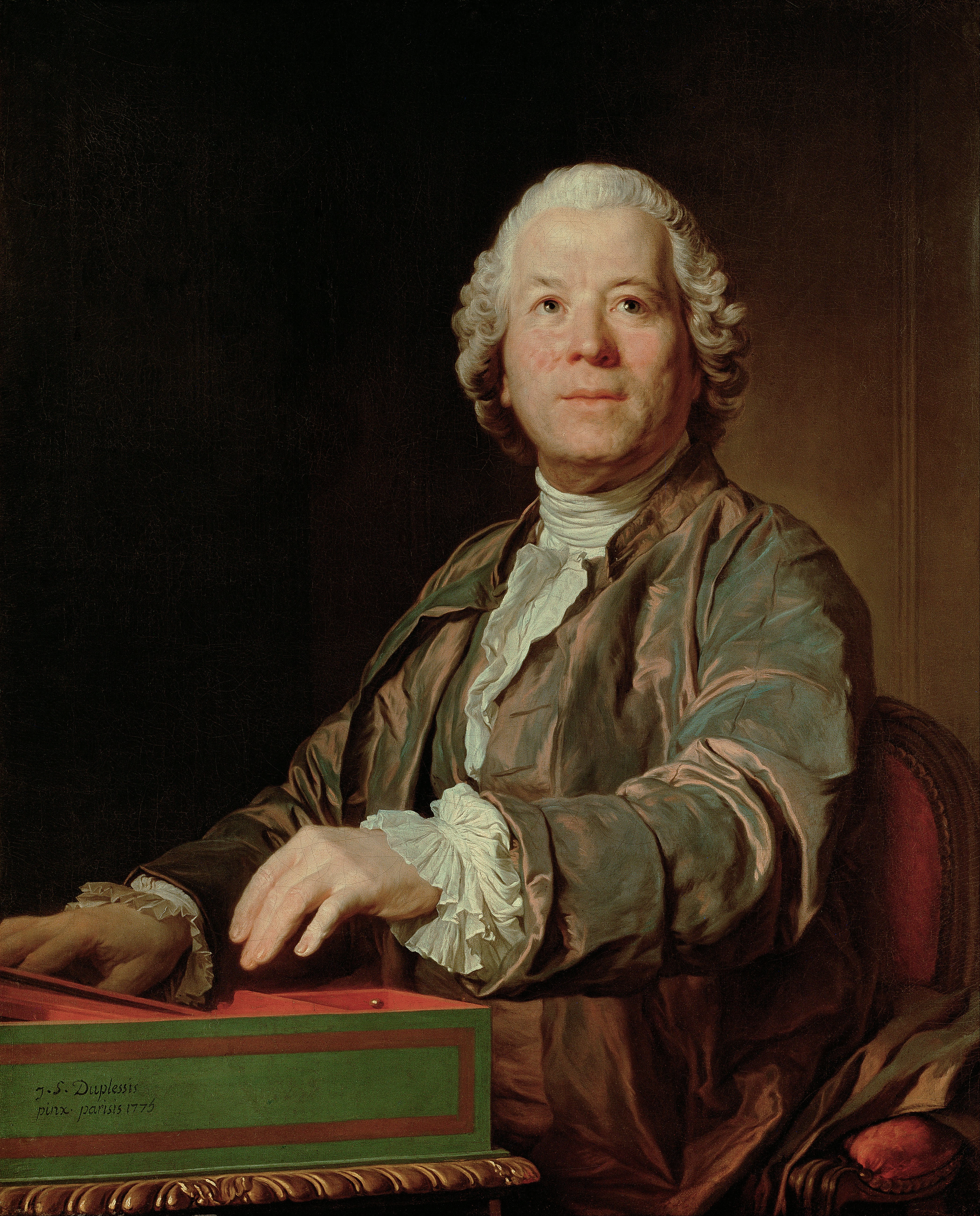
Portrait of Christoph Willibald Gluck by Joseph Duplessis, 1775

The nature and allocation of the arias to the different roles in opera seria was highly formalized. According to the playwright and librettist Carlo Goldoni, in his autobiography,

The three principal personages of the drama ought to sing five arias each; two in the first act, two in the second, and one in the third. The second actress and the second soprano can only have three, and the inferior characters must be satisfied with a single aria each, or two at the most. The author of the words must [...] take care that two pathetic [i.e. melancholy] arias do not succeed one another. He must distribute with the same precaution the bravura arias, the arias of action, the inferior arias, and the minuets and rondeaus. He must, above all things, avoid giving impassioned arias, bravura arias, or rondeaus, to inferior characters.

By contrast, arias in opera buffa (comic opera) were often specific in character to the nature of the character being portrayed (for example the cheeky servant-girl or the irascible elderly suitor or guardian).

By later in the century it was clear that these formats were becoming fossilized. Christoph Willibald Gluck thought that both opera buffa and opera seria had strayed too far from what opera should really be, and seemed unnatural. The jokes of opera buffa were threadbare and the repetition of the same characters made them seem no more than stereotypes. In opera seria the singing was devoted to superficial effects and the content was uninteresting and stale. As in opera buffa, the singers were often masters of the stage and the music, decorating the vocal lines so floridly that audiences could no longer recognise the original melody. Gluck wanted to return opera to its origins, focusing on human drama and passions and making words and music of equal importance. The effects of these Gluckist reforms were seen not only in his own operas but in the later works of Mozart; the arias now become far more expressive of the individual emotions of the characters and are both more firmly anchored in, and advance, the storyline. Richard Wagner was to praise Gluck's innovations in his 1850 essay "Opera and Drama": " The musical composer revolted against the wilfulness of the singer"; rather than "unfold[ing] the purely sensuous contents of the Aria to their highest, rankest, pitch", Gluck sought "to put shackles on Caprice's execution of that Aria, by himself endeavouring to give the tune [...] an expression answering to the underlying Word-text". This attitude was to underlie Wagner's would-be deconstruction of aria in his concept of Gesamtkunstwerk.

=== 19th century ===
Despite the ideals of Gluck, and the trend to organise libretti so that arias had a more organic part in the drama rather than merely interrupting its flow, in the operas of the early 19th century, (for example those of Gioachino Rossini and Gaetano Donizetti), bravura arias remained focal attractions, and they continued to play a major role in grand opera, and in Italian opera through the 19th century.

A favoured form of aria in the first half of the 19th century in Italian opera was the cabaletta, in which a songlike cantabile section is followed by a more animated section, the cabaletta proper, repeated in whole or in part. Typically such arias would be preceded by recitative, the whole sequence being termed a scena. There might also be opportunities for participation by orchestra or chorus. An example is Casta diva from the opera Norma of Vincenzo Bellini.

After around 1850, aria forms in Italian opera began to show more variety – many of the operas of Giuseppe Verdi offer extended narrative arias for leading roles that enable, in their scope, intensification of drama and characterisation. Examples include Rigoletto's condemnation of the court, "Cortigiani, vil razza dannata!" (1851).

Later in the century, the post-1850 operas of Wagner were through-composed, with fewer elements being readily identifiable as self-contained arias; whilst the Italian genre of verismo opera also sought to integrate arioso elements although still allowing some 'show-pieces'.

== Concert arias ==
Concert arias, which are not part of any larger work, (or were sometimes written to replace or insert arias in their own operas or operas of other composers) were written by composers to provide the opportunity for vocal display for concert singers; examples are Ah! perfido, Op. 65, by Beethoven, and a number of concert arias by Mozart, including Conservati fedele.

== Instrumental music ==
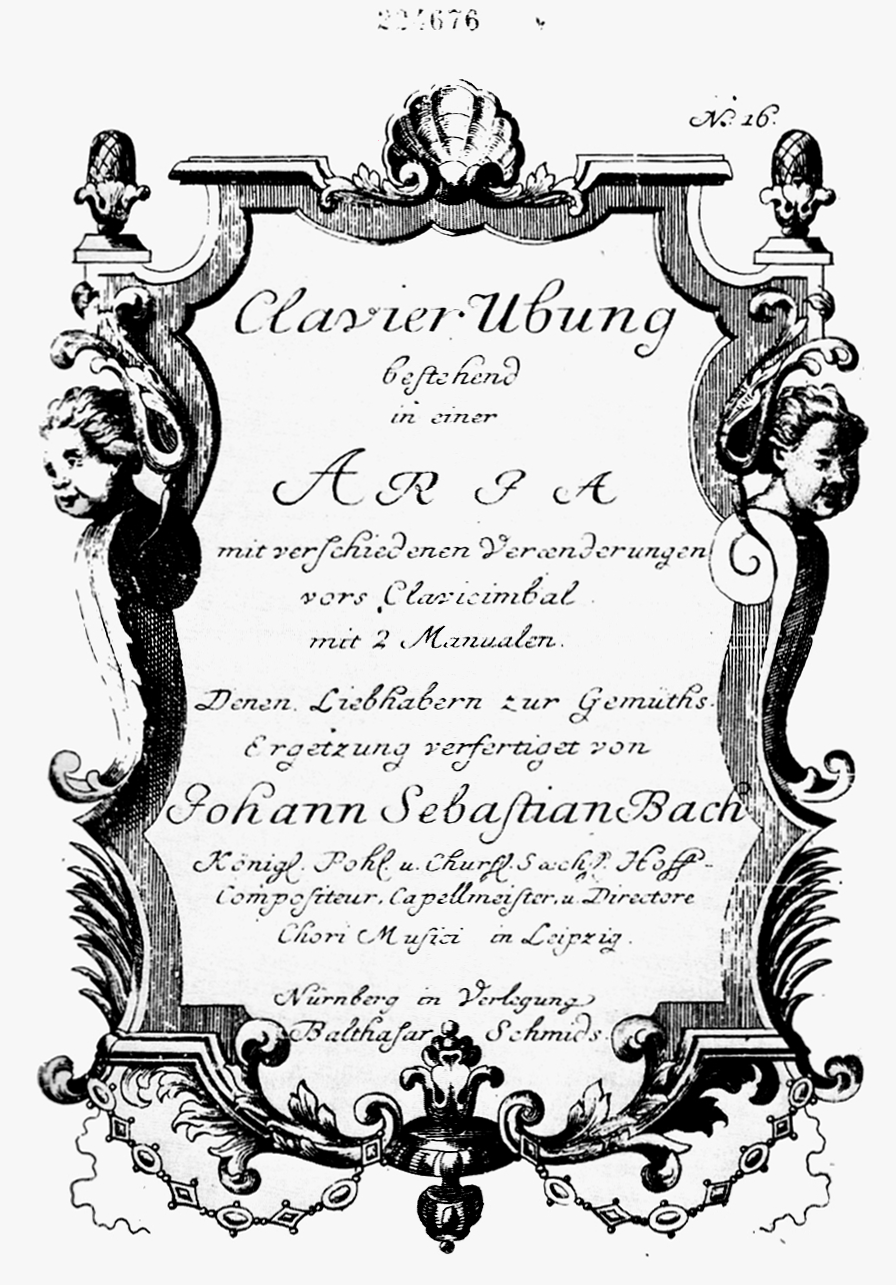
Title page of the Goldberg Variations (first edition, 1741)

The term 'aria' was frequently used in the 17th and 18th centuries for instrumental music modelled on vocal music. For example, J. S. Bach's so-called "Goldberg Variations" were titled at their 1741 publication "Clavier Ubung bestehend in einer ARIA mit verschiedenen Verænderungen" ("Keyboard exercise, consisting of one ARIA with diverse variations.")

The word is sometimes used in contemporary music as a title for instrumental pieces, e.g. Robin Holloway's 1980 'aria' for chamber ensemble or Harrison Birtwistle's brass band piece, "Grimethorpe Aria" (1973).

== See also ==
- See Category:Arias
