= Mozart's Berlin journey =

1789 journey of Wolfgang Amadeus Mozart

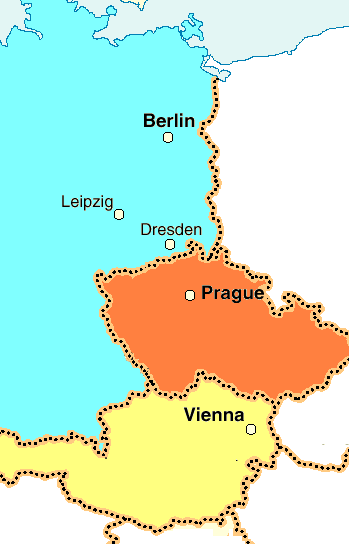
The cities of Vienna, Prague, Dresden, and Berlin lie on a roughly north-south axis, in the present-day nations of Austria (tan), the Czech Republic (orange) and Germany (light blue); Leipzig falls somewhat to the west of this axis. Distances: Vienna-Prague, 251 km; Prague-Dresden, 118 km; Dresden-Leipzig, 102 km; Leipzig-Berlin, 153 km.

One of the longest adulthood journeys of Wolfgang Amadeus Mozart was a visit, beginning in spring 1789, to a series of cities lying northward of his adopted home in Vienna: Prague, Leipzig, Dresden, and Berlin.

== Departure ==
The journey took place during a difficult period of Mozart's career when he was no longer earning much money from concerts, and his income from the composition of operas had not made up the difference. He was borrowing money, for example from his friend Michael Puchberg, and the financial situation was very worrisome.

Mozart's passage to Berlin was free of charge: he accompanied his aristocratic patron and fellow Mason Prince Karl Lichnowsky, (a patron of both Mozart and Beethoven) who had his own reasons for visiting Berlin and had offered Mozart a ride.

Mozart and Lichnowsky departed Vienna on the morning of 8 April 1789. They reached Prague on 10 April. In a letter written that day to his wife Constanze, Mozart reported the good news that oboist Friedrich Ramm, traveling from Berlin, told him that Friedrich Wilhelm II, King of Prussia, was eagerly awaiting him in Potsdam. The King was a great potential source of concert income and commissions for new works. Mozart also reported to Constanze that he had worked out an agreement with Domenico Guardasoni, the director of the Italian opera in Prague, for a new opera for a fee of 250 ducats (ca. 1,000 florins).

== Itinerary cities ==
=== Dresden ===
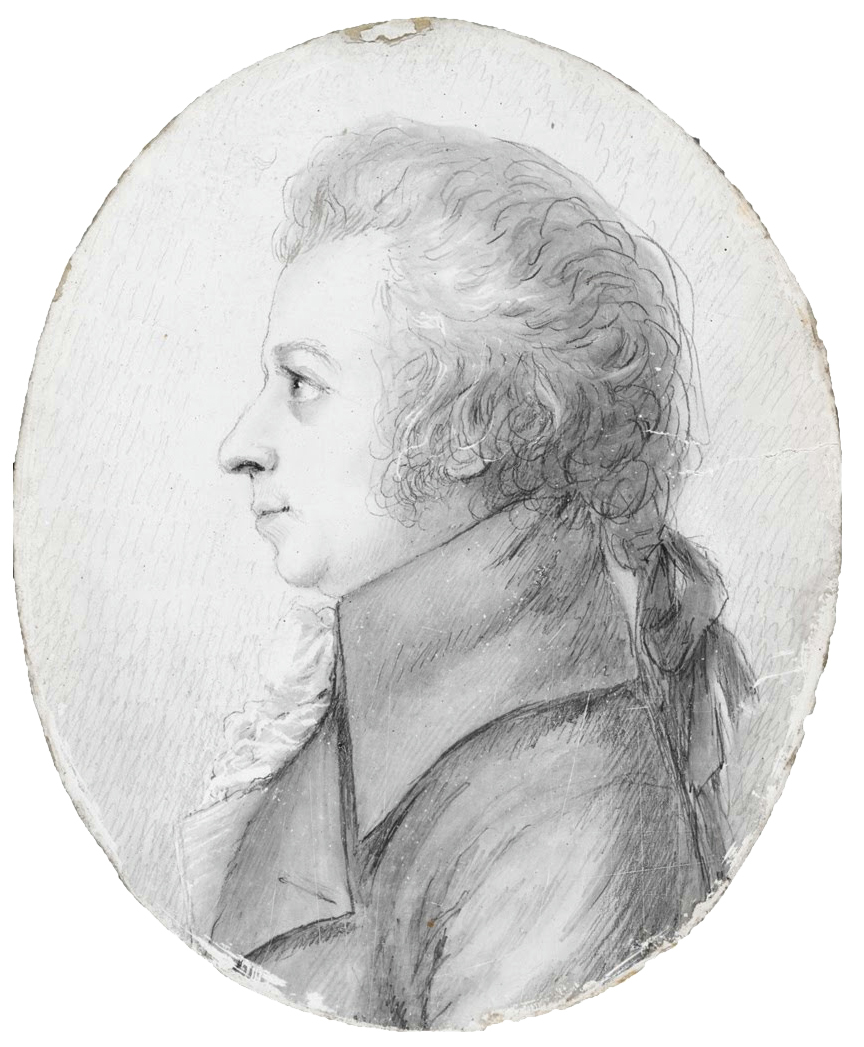
Mozart as portrayed by Dora Stock during his visit to Dresden

They arrived in Dresden on 12 April, and lodged at the "Hôtel de Pologne". This hotel was the scene of a concert performed the next day; according to Deutsch, "Mozart performed quartets with the organist Anton Teyber and the cellist Anton Kraft; they also played the String trio, K. 563." At the same concert, Mozart accompanied his friend Josepha Duschek who also travelled to Dresden from her home in Prague. Duschek sang arias from The Marriage of Figaro and Don Giovanni. In a letter to his wife, Mozart writes that they arranged a quartet at the hotel, which they performed in the chapel. "Wir hatten bei uns a l'hotel de Boulogne ein quartett arrangirt. - wir machten es in der Kappelle mit Antoine Tayber..."

The following day, Mozart performed for Elector Friedrich August III of Saxony and his wife Amalie; his collaborators included the nine-year-old cellist Nikolaus Kraft and Duschek. Mozart played the newly written Coronation Concerto K. 537, and was on the next day awarded a snuff-box with 100 ducats.

The following day (15 April), Mozart had lunch with the Russian ambassador, Prince Alexander Belovselsky-Beloserky, and then conducted a trial of skill, first on organ, then on the piano, against organist Johann Wilhelm Hässler.

On either 16 or 17 April Mozart paid a visit to the consistorial councillor Christian Gottfried Körner, a friend of Friedrich Schiller. Körner's sister-in-law Dora Stock was a talented artist and took the occasion to sketch a portrait of Mozart, shown here, in silverpoint on ivory board. This may have been the last portrait of the composer to be produced.

=== Leipzig ===
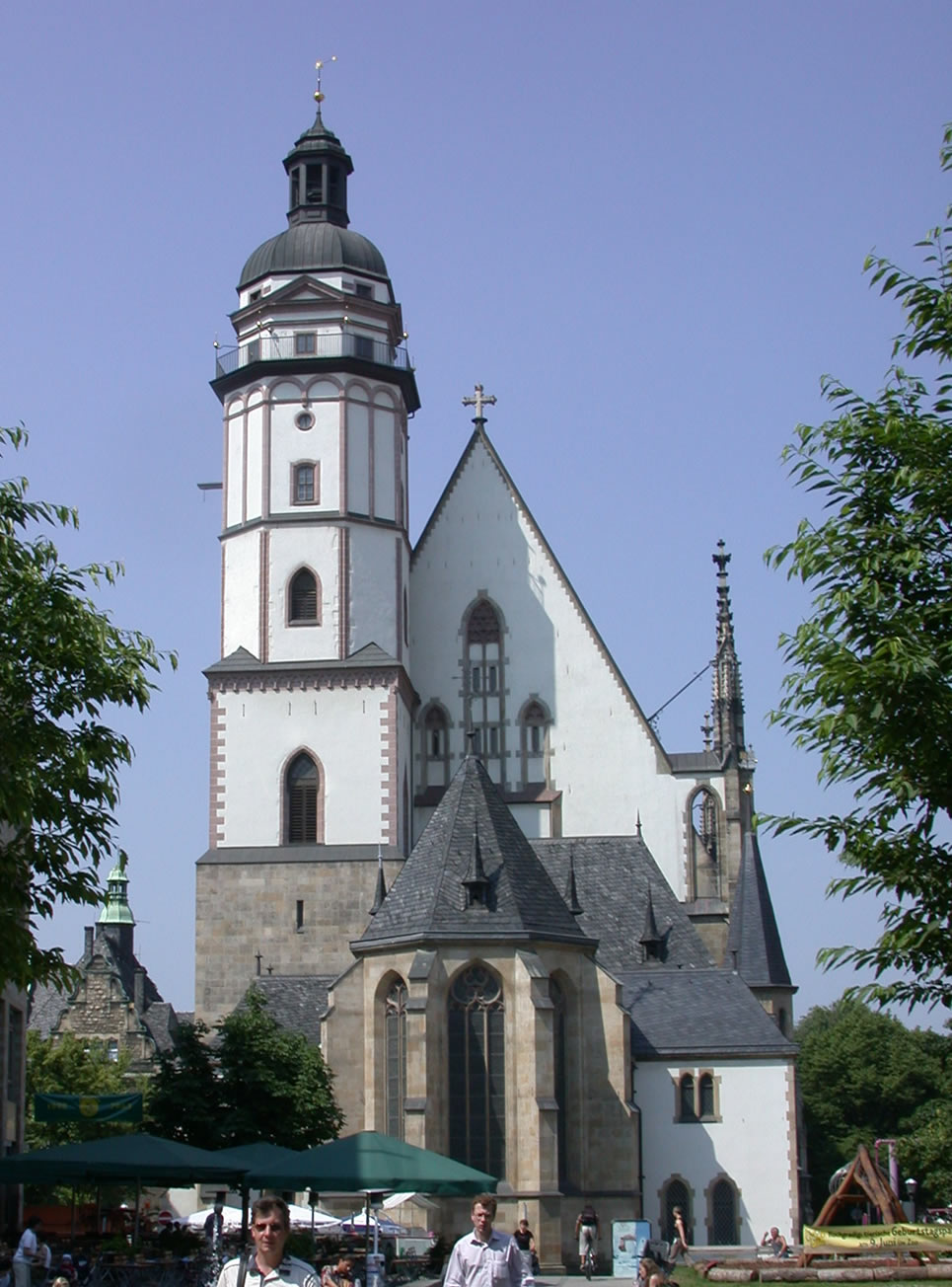
Thomaskirche in Leipzig

On 18 April Lichnowsky and Mozart departed for Leipzig, where they arrived two days later. Mozart spent three days here. He visited the famous Thomaskirche, where Johann Sebastian Bach had served as music director several decades earlier. Mozart had become a great admirer of Bach's music during his early years in Vienna, thanks to the influence of Gottfried van Swieten. Mozart improvised on the organ of the Thomaskirche. Cantor Friedrich Doles, who had been a pupil of Bach, and organist Karl Friedrich Görner, the son of Johann Gottlieb Görner, manipulated the stops of the organ for him. Probably on this occasion, the choir of the Thomasschule performed Bach's motet 'Singet dem Herrn ein neues Lied, BWV 225, and Mozart took advantage of the occasion to copy the composition out of all choirparts.

=== Berlin ===
On 23 April, Mozart traveled from Leipzig to Potsdam, near Berlin, where King Friedrich Wilhelm of Prussia maintained his principal residence and arrived on 25 April. As noted above, Mozart had told his wife that the King was anxiously awaiting him; if so, the arrival was a disappointment as the following court document indicated:

One named Mozart (who at his ingress declared himself to be a Capellmeister from Vienna) reports here that he was brought hither in the company of Prince Lichnowsky, that he desired to lay his talents before Your Sovereign Majesty's feet and awaited the command whether he may hope that Your Sovereign Majesty will receive him.

Reading this, the King scribbled in the margin "Directeur du Port", meaning that Mozart should be referred to Jean-Pierre Duport, the director of the royal chamber music. According to Deutsch, Mozart was "not on good terms" with Duport. Attempting (in Solomon's view) to "curry favor", he composed (29 April) a set of nine piano variations on a minuet by Duport, K. 573. No royal audience was granted at this time, and indeed, there is no solid evidence that Mozart even remained in Potsdam.

=== Leipzig again ===
On 8 May, Mozart briefly returned to Leipzig, where on 12 May he gave a concert at the Gewandhaus. The concert program consisted entirely of Mozart's music: the piano concerti K. 456 and K. 503, two scenas for soprano (K. 505, K. 528) performed by Josepha Duschek, the fantasy for piano solo K. 475, and two unidentified symphonies. Following a custom of the time, the first of the symphonies was split, the first two movements being played at the opening of the concert and the second two before the intermission.

The concert, organized on short notice, apparently was not well attended. Mozart writes back home, that "from the point of view of applause and glory this concert was absolutely magnificent but the profits were wretchedly meager" (letter, 16 May 1789).

Prince Lichnowsky, who had been traveling with Mozart up to this time, left Leipzig in mid-May, and Mozart's subsequent travels were on his own.

Mozart lingered in Leipzig until 17 May, partly due to his wish (reported in a letter to Constanze) to remain in the company of a group of friends also visiting the city (Johann Leopold Neumann, Frau Neumann, and Josepha Duschek). His departure was also delayed, he told Constanze, by a dearth of horses available for traveling.

=== Return to Berlin and home ===
Mozart then returned to Berlin, arriving on 19 May. In his letters to Constanze, on this second stay in Berlin he performed before the King and Queen at the royal palace (26 May), reporting his receipt of an award of 100 Friedrichs d'or (around 800 florins) and commissions from the King for six string quartets and a set of six easy piano sonatas for Princess Friederieke.

The night Mozart arrived in Berlin, he apparently attended a performance of his own opera Die Entführung aus dem Serail. Local newspapers apparently did not report his presence, but it was recorded much later (1856) in the posthumously published memoirs of a distinguished figure of German literature, Ludwig Tieck (1773-1853). Tieck was not quite 16 at the time; he refers to himself in the third person.

Ludwig's regard for Mozart was to be rewarded in a surprising way. One evening in 1789, entering the dimly-lit and still empty theatre long before the beginning of the performance, as was his wont, he caught sight of a man in the orchestra pit whom he did not know. He was small, rapid of movement, restless, and with a stupid expression on his face: an unprepossessing figure in a grey overcoat. He was going from one music-desk to the next and seemed to be looking carefully through the music on them. Ludwig at once entered on a conversation. They spoke of the orchestra, the theatre, the opera, the public's taste. He expressed his views openly, but spoke of Mozart's operas with the deepest admiration. "So you often hear Mozart's operas and are fond of them?" the stranger asked, "that is very good of you, young man." They continued their conversation for some time, the auditorium slowly filled, and finally the stranger was called away by someone on the stage. His words had strangely moved Ludwig; he made enquiries. It was Mozart himself, the great master, who had spoken with him and expressed his appreciation to him.

Mozart left Berlin on 28 May, traveled via Dresden to Prague, where he stayed from 31 May to 2 June, and finally arrived home in Vienna at midday on 4 June.

After the journey, it emerged that Mozart had incurred a financial debt to Lichnowsky, perhaps during the journey itself. The amount of the debt was 1415 florins, for which the Prince successfully sued Mozart in October 1791, not long before the composer's death.

== Solomon's hypothesis of infidelity ==
The trip was the first that Mozart took following his marriage to Constanze in 1782 during which his wife did not accompany him. Mozart wrote frequently to Constanze in the early stages of the trip, but the loss of many letters makes it uncertain whether he continued this regular correspondence. Maynard Solomon, in his 1995 Mozart biography, argues that Mozart was being unfaithful to his wife, pursuing an affair with Duschek, whose own itinerary through Germany (she lived in Prague) frequently intersected Mozart's. The basis of his claim is that too many letters went missing for it to be an accident, as well as the details of the timing of Mozart and Duschek's journeys.

Solomon's hypothesis has not received the assent of other scholars; see for instance the work of musicologist Bruce Alan Brown, rejecting it.
