= Ah! perfido =

Concert aria by Ludwig van Beethoven

- Concert aria by Ludwig van Beethoven
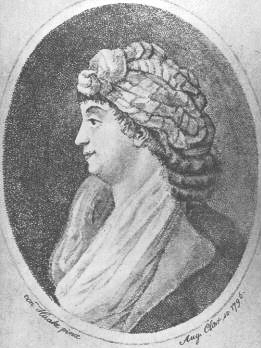
- Josepha Duschek in 1796, when she was the first soloist of the concert aria
- English: Ah! Deceiver
- Key: C major/E-flat major
- Opus: 65
- Text: Pietro Metastasio; anonymous
- Language: Italian
- Performed: 21 November 1796: Leipzig
- Scoring: soprano and orchestra

"Ah! perfido" (Ah! Deceiver), Op. 65, is a concert aria for soprano and orchestra by Ludwig van Beethoven. The dramatic scena begins with a recitative in C major, taken from Pietro Metastasio's Achille in Sciro. The aria "Per pietà, non dirmi addio" (For pity's sake, do not bid me farewell) is set in the key of E-flat major, and its lyricist is anonymous. A performance takes about 14 minutes.

== History ==
The work was first performed on 21 November 1796 in the theatre at the Ranstädter Tor in Leipzig, with soprano Josepha Duschek as the soloist. The singer, a friend of Mozart in Prague, advertised it as "an Italian scena written by Beethoven for Mad. Duschek", possibly to raise interest rather than a statement about a dedication. The only extant manuscript by a copyist has a dedication to "Signora Comtessa di Clari", Countess Josephine of Clary-Aldringen.

Another notable performance occurred in 1808 as part of a benefit concert for the composer on 22 December which also featured the premieres of his fifth and sixth symphonies, an excerpt of his Mass in C major, among others. The singer was the 17-year old Josephine Schultz-Killitschky who stepped in on short notice after others cancelled. A sister-in-law of the violinist Ignaz Schuppanzigh, she possibly performed, to mixed reaction, from the manuscript which shows changes made by Beethoven. This version differs from the first edition, which causes a problem for editors as both versions are authorized by Beethoven.

The work was first published in Leipzig in 1805 by the Bureau de Musique Hoffmeister & Kühnel of Franz Anton Hoffmeister and Ambrosius Kühnel, without an Opus number, like many early works by Beethoven. In 1819, Hofmeister in Leipzig printed it and assigned number 46. The number 65, which Beethoven had for unknown reasons not used, was assigned to the piece in 1819 by Artaria in Vienna, when Beethoven's Piano Sonata Op. 106 was published with a works list. In chronological order, a number in the range 5 to 10 would be justified. Breitkopf & Härtel printed the work in 1862 as part of Ludwig van Beethovens Werke, a publication of his complete works.

== Text ==
Ah! perfido, spergiuro,
barbaro traditor, tu parti?
e son questi gl'ultimi tuoi congedi?
ove s'intese tirannia più crudel?
Va, scelerato! va, pur fuggi da me,
l'ira de' Numi non fuggirai!
Se v'è giustizia in Ciel, se v'è pietà,
congiureranno a gara tutti a punirti!
Ombra seguace! presente, ovunque vai,
vedrò le mie vendette;
io già le godo immaginando;
i fulmini ti veggo già balenar d'intorno.
Ah no! ah no! fermate, vindici Dei!
risparmiate quel cor, ferite il mio!
s'ei non è più qual era son'io qual fui,
per lui vivea, voglio morir per lui!

Per pietà, non dirmi addio,
di te priva che farò?
tu lo sai, bell'idol mio!
io d'affanno morirò.

Ah crudel! tu vuoi ch'io mora!
tu non hai pietà di me?
perchè rendi a chi t'adora
così barbara mercè?
Dite voi, se in tanto affanno
non son degna di pietà?

Ah! Faithless one, perjured,
barbarous betrayer, do you leave?
And are these your last farewells?
Who ever suffered such cruel tyranny?
Go, wicked man! Go, run from me,
The wrath of the Gods you shall not escape!
If there is justice in Heaven, if there is mercy,
They will join together to punish you!
Pursuing shade, present wherever you go,
I shall see my vengeance;
I already enjoy it in my mind;
I see already lightning flashing about you.
Ah no, ah no, stop, Gods of vengeance!
Spare that heart, strike mine!
Though he has changed, I am what I was,
Through him I lived, I would die for him!

For pity, do not bid me farewell,
What shall I do without you?
You know, fair beloved,
I shall die troubled.

Ah, cruel one, you would that I die!
Have you no pity for me?
Why do you treat one who adores you
With such barbarous reward?
Tell me if in such trouble
Am I not worthy of pity?
