= Concert aria =

Music genre

A concert aria is normally an aria or operatic scene (scena) composed for singer and orchestra, written specifically for performance in concert rather than as part of an opera. Concert arias have often been composed for particular singers, the composer always bearing that singer's voice and skill in mind when composing the work.

The term also refers to insertion arias for operas, that is those that were written as additions to the score after its initial completion or as possible substitutions for other arias. These are sometimes performed in concerts because they are no longer required for their original purpose, though they were not, strictly speaking, composed for performance in concert.

The concert arias of Wolfgang Amadeus Mozart most frequently performed today, but there are many examples by other composers, such as:

- "Son qual nave ch'agitata" by Riccardo Broschi (written for the famous castrato Farinelli)
- "Ermina" by Juan Arriaga
- "Ah! perfido" by Ludwig van Beethoven
- "Der Wein" for soprano and orchestra by Alban Berg
- "Scena di Berenice" by Joseph Haydn
- "Infelice!" by Felix Mendelssohn

== Mozart concert arias ==
Among the more well-known of Mozart's concert arias are:

- "Popoli di Tessaglia!", K. 316, for soprano, with its two famous G_{6} notes (i.e., the G above high C - according to the Guinness Book of Records, the highest musical note ever scored for the human voice) that come shortly before the end. This aria was composed in order to be inserted into Gluck's opera Alceste, and also specifically to showcase the superlative vocal skills of Mozart's sister-in-law, Aloysia Weber, who was only 18 at the time. Sopranos who are able to cope with the aria's demands have been few and far between, and the aria is usually omitted from performances of Alceste. It has been therefore redesignated a concert aria, to be presented in concerts by such rare singers as are able to deliver its fiendishly difficult coloratura.
- "Nehmt meinen Dank, ihr holden Gönner!", K. 383, for soprano.
- "Ch'io mi scordi di te?", K. 505, written for Nancy Storace
- "Vorrei spiegarvi, oh Dio!", K. 418, written for Aloysia Weber
- "Bella mia fiamma", K. 528, written for Josepha Duschek
- "Per questa bella mano", K. 612, for bass, double bass obbligato, and orchestra
