= Bertramka =

House museum in the Czech Republic

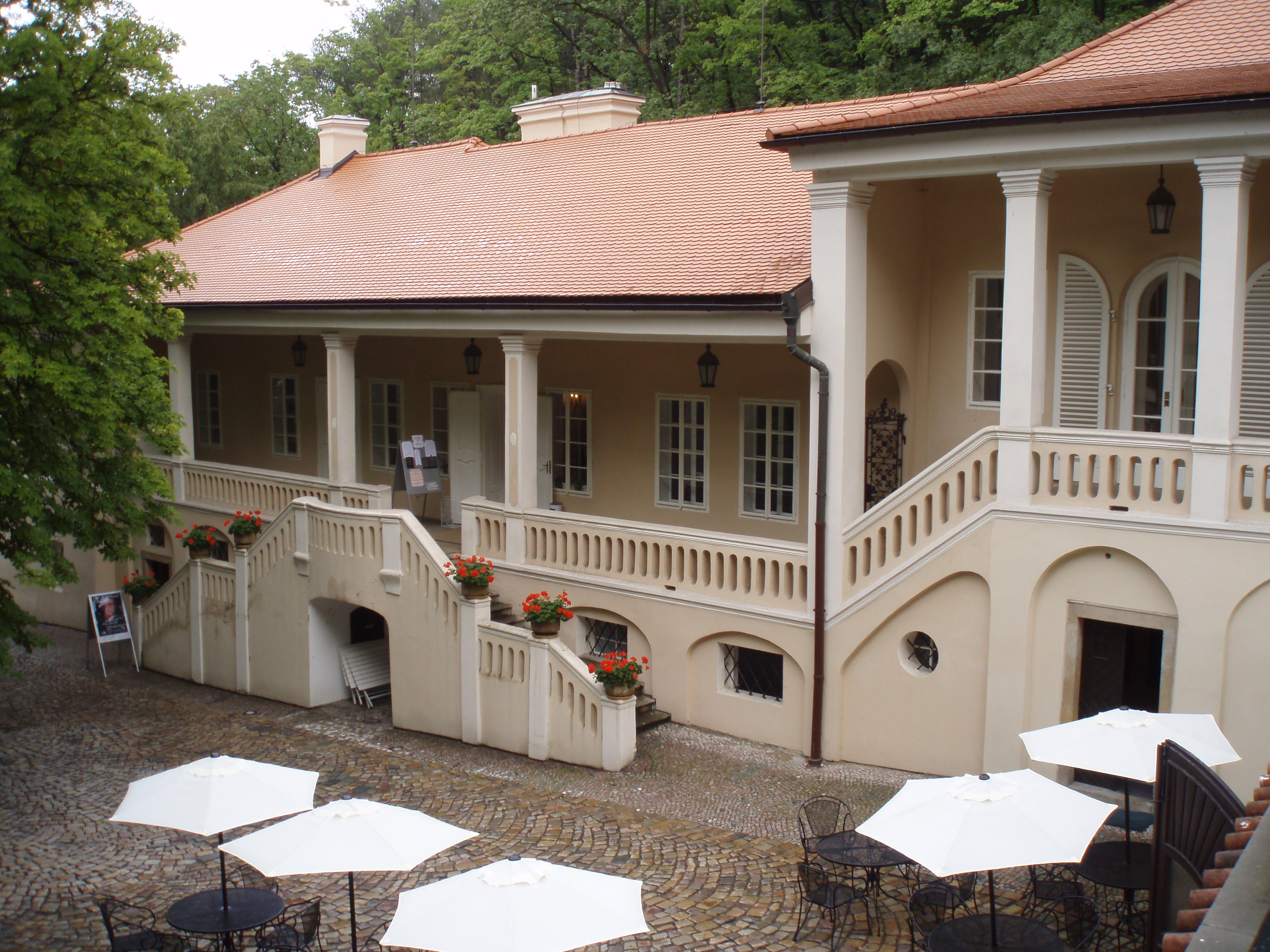
- Bertramka, which Mozart likely visited during his second visit to Prague in October and November 1787

- Location within Prague

General information
- Location: Smíchov, Prague
- Coordinates: 50°4′13.1″N 14°23′42.3″E

Website
- bertramka.eu

Bertramka (Czech: Muzeum W.A. Mozarta a manželů Duškových) is a villa in Prague where Mozart was a frequent guest. Bertramka is now a museum dedicated to the memory of Mozart and to the former owners and Mozart’s hosts: Mr and Mrs Dušek.

Bertramka is situated about a mile from the city centre. In the late 18th century it would still have been well outside the walls of the city, beneath the vineyards on the slopes of Černý vrch (Black Hill). Today the villa with its grounds still maintains tranquillity.

== History of Bertramka ==
It is not known who built Bertramka. The estate had belonged to a Carthusian monastery for several centuries. The present villa was constructed around 1700 and consists of a large home with two-winged staircase and several outbuildings, all surrounded, as now, by a wall. It had been customary for the wealthy inhabitants of Prague to build grand houses for their relaxation not far from the city. These were often combined with agricultural activities. The grounds of Bertramka were certainly used for farming as well as vine culture. It produced fruit, wheat, milk, poultry and vegetables. The villa appears to have got its name around the mid-18th century from Franziska and Franz von Bertram.

Bertramka was purchased by František Dušek and his wife Josefa Dušková in 1784 and for 15 years it was a meeting place for many great artists and noble aristocrats who gathered at soirées and social gatherings. Concerts were held weekly during the summer months. Those taking part included Leopold Koželuch (aka Johann Anton Koželuch), Franz Niemetschek and Johann Nepomuk Hummel. It is highly likely that the adventurer Giacomo Casanova stayed there.

Following František’s death the property changed hands several times until, in 1838 it was purchased by Lambert Popelka who was a great admirer of Mozart. He contacted Mozart's son Karl Thomas Mozart in 1856 and had a bust of Mozart put in the garden. In 1887 he organized a memorial gathering, at which Antonín Dvořák was present, to celebrate the 100th anniversary of the first performance of Don Giovanni. Popelka stipulated in his will that the two rooms that had been occupied by Mozart should never be inhabited and would be preserved as a shrine to Mozart’s memory. Bertramka remained in the hands of the Popelka family until 1918. After more changing of hands it received a state grant in 1929 and became part of the Mozart Society in the Czech Republic. Reconstruction took place gradually and in 1956 an exhibition was established in time for the bicentenary of the composer’s birth.

== The Dušek family ==
Josefa Dušková was an extremely fine singer, highly regarded in Prague as well as outside the area. She was not only an outstanding musical talent, but also a gifted and warm-hearted host who entertained many famous people at her home. She married František Dušek in 1776. She had been having piano lessons from him for six years. František Dušek (who spelt his name in German "Duschek") was a highly regarded musician, and her marriage to him gave Josefa social status beyond that which would have been possible through her stage performances alone. She had great taste in art and sculpture and often entertained famous painters.

František died in 1799 and his death gradually led to financial hardship for Josefa. She sold Bertramka and gradually moved to smaller and smaller apartments, although she continued to sing occasionally, dying in relative poverty in 1824.

== Mozart and Bertramka ==
Mozart visited Prague five times in all: three times for prolonged visits and, in between these, twice on passing through. He first came to Prague in January 1787 for a performance of Le nozze di Figaro . Despite this opera having been a huge success at its first performance in Vienna in April 1786 the Viennese were already tiring of Mozart and turning their attention to other composers such as Antonio Salieri. Mozart was caught up in a many intrigues and was desperate for money. This is why he came to Prague with his new opera. It caused a sensation and the Prague audiences were always to remain faithful to Mozart.

The Mozarts had arrived in Prague on 11 January 1787. His name was already well-known in Prague. Even the customs officer on duty at the New Gate asked, on examining Mozart’s passport, whether he was the composer of Figaro. On this occasion Josefa and František Dušek, who had met Mozart in Salzburg, were abroad and therefore unable to host him.

Figaro was such a success that the opera manager, Pasquale Bondini, commissioned a new opera from him. This was to be Don Giovanni. He returned to Prague with his new opera in the autumn, probably in late September. He had lodgings in the town, at “Zu den drei goldenen Löwen”, another property of Dušek. Today there is a plaque on the wall which reads “V tomto domě bydlel Mozart v roce 1787” (“In this house lived Mozart in the year 1787”). Here and in Bertramka he worked on finishing the composition of the opera. The tranquillity of Betramka as well as the skittles in the garden provided him with the necessary relaxation. According to Georg Nikolaus von Nissen he would stand up when it was his turn to play, and no sooner had he taken his throw than he would sit down and carry on working at his score. The story of how the overture was written at the very last moment is well-known, though we cannot be sure whether this happened in Bertramka or in his town lodgings. It was performed on 29 October in the Estates Theatre and received an ovation. Mozart was to live on the success of this production for the rest of his days, although it never solved his financial problems.

Mozart very probably stayed at Bertramka during his third prolonged visit to Prague in the summer of 1791 when the city was celebrating the coronation of Leopold Joseph II as king of Bohemia. Mozart’s La clemenza di Tito was part of the celebrations, although neither he nor the opera were even mentioned by name in the official coronation brochure. Mozart on this occasion was writing for the court officials. However, once the Prague masses heard the opera they showered it with praise.

Mozart wrote two or three arias for Josefa. He had written Bella mia fiamma for her in 1787. In 1791 he also wrote the aria Io ti lascio, o cara, addio, quite possibly again for her. Another aria Non piu di fiori was written for her, and she frequently included it in her concerts.

After Mozart's death the Dušeks showed much kindness to Mozart's two surviving sons. Karl Thomas Mozart spent five years in Prague and in Bertramka.

== Museum ==
=== Initial opening ===
The exhibition was opened in 1956. It contained memorabilia relating to Mozart’s visit to Bertramka and Prague. There were two keyboard instruments on which Mozart would have played, and even a lock of his hair. Some original wall-paintings had been preserved. There is a bust of the composer in the garden.

During the summer months there were regular concerts which were a major attraction. Some of these were given in the garden, weather permitting, or they were in the Sala Terrena which seated an audience of about 70, and overlooks the rear terrace and garden.

The museum was open daily throughout the year.

=== Closure ===
In 1986, the then President of the Mozart Society, Jitka Snížková, was pressured into donating the villa to the state.

After her sudden death, the donation was contested, and the museum was closed on November 1, 2009.

=== Reopening ===
After 14 years of legal battle with the city hall of Prague 5, represented by highly controversial mayor Milan Jančík and with influential private society Comenius run by former communist secret police agent Karel Muzikář which rented Bertramka, the courts ruled in favour of Mozart's Society and ordered the restitution of the property. On 26/11/2009, Prague 5 and Comenius ransacked the villa and returned it to Mozart's Society. With a help from numerous people and most notably fellow Mozart's Societies from abroad, Bertramka opened again on July 6, 2010, for a daily operation from 10 am to 6 pm.
