= Domenico Guardasoni =

Italian opera singer

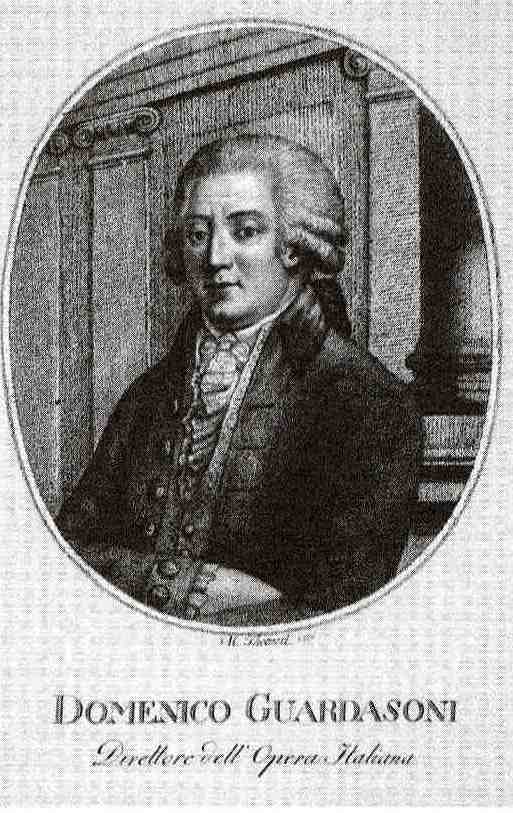
Domenico Guardasoni

Domenico Guardasoni (c. 1731 – 14 June 1806) was an Italian tenor singer, opera producer and impresario.

Guardasoni was born at Modena, Duchy of Modena and Reggio. Singing in Giuseppe Bustelli's touring opera company, he later became its director. He also presented operas by Mozart, such as the 1787 première of Don Giovanni, and it was Guardasoni who commissioned La clemenza di Tito in 1791 for the Italian opera and National Theatre in Prague, of which he was director. He died in Vienna.

== Sources ==
- Freeman, Daniel E. Mozart in Prague (2021). ISBN 978-1-950743-50-6.
- "Domenico Guardasoni." The Concise Grove Dictionary of Music. Oxford University Press, Inc., 1994. Answers.com 22 Jan. 2009.
