= Josepha Duschek =

Czech soprano

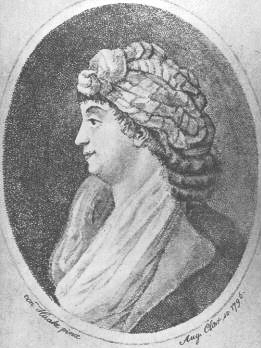
Portrait of Josepha Duschek dated 1796

Josepha Duschek (née Hambacher) (1754–1824) was an outstanding soprano of the Classical era. She was a friend of Wolfgang Amadeus Mozart, who wrote a few works for her to sing.

Her name is most often given in its German version as above. In Czech her name was Josefína Dušková or (with Germanized spelling) Josepha Duschkova.

== Life ==
She was born Josepha Hambacher in Prague, then a provincial capital of the Habsburg monarchy, on 6 March 1754, and lived in Prague all of her life. Her father was a prosperous apothecary, Anton Adalbert Hambacher (also "Hampacher") and her mother was Maria Domenica Colomba, who came from Salzburg. Her father’s pharmacy was in the house called "Zum weissen Einhorn" ("The White Unicorn"). Built in the Baroque style, it was situated in the Old Town Square where the pharmaceutical business flourished until the 20th century.

In her youth Josepha studied music with František Xaver Dušek, whom she married on 21 October 1776. Josefa’s husband already had an international reputation as a music teacher. He was a welcome guest in the music salons and he and his wife became well-known hosts at their home, Villa Bertramka. It is not known whether the couple performed together as musicians, but they hosted frequent musical gatherings at which many famous people were present.

Josepha and her husband had three children Albert, Anton and Maria. As a singing trio, the children toured throughout Europe and met personalities like Mozart, Beethoven and Schubert.

Josepha had earlier been the lover of the art patron Count Christian Philipp Clam-Gallas, and it was said that she continued to profit long afterwards from the relationship as the Count provided her with an annuity of 900 Gulden and even contributed to the purchase of the Villa Bertramka.

Her career as a singer was long and successful; she gave concerts in many different cities, including Prague, Vienna, Salzburg, Dresden, Weimar, Leipzig, Warsaw and Berlin.

The singer and her husband were also close with the composer Ludwig van Beethoven. While Beethoven was in Prague in 1796, he wrote his concert aria Ah! perfido, Op. 65, for this talented singer. She was not able to sing the piece at its debut because of a conflicting engagement, but she did perform the piece in both Prague and later in Leipzig. The debut was performed by the Countess Josephine Clary, to whom Beethoven later dedicated the piece.

Duschek never accepted a permanent engagement, but always remained a freelance singer.

After her husband’s death in 1799 she retired from public life. She sold Bertramka, and lived in increasingly smaller apartments in Prague. By the time of her death in 1824 she had become impoverished. She is buried at the Malostranský Cemetery in Prague.

== Duschek and Mozart ==
Duschek met Mozart in 1777 when she visited Salzburg, where her mother was from and she had relatives. At that time Mozart composed for her the recitative and aria "Ah, lo previdi," K. 272.

Mozart accompanied her at a private concert before the Viennese court in 1786, shortly after the success of his opera The Marriage of Figaro.

While Duschek was on friendly terms with the Mozart family at this time, Leopold was critical of her singing, writing to his daughter on 21 April 1786: 'How did Madame Duschek sing? I have to say it! She shrieked an aria by Naumann, quite astonishingly, with exaggerated expression as before but even more annoyingly.'

In 1787, The Marriage of Figaro was mounted in a Prague production. A number of Prague music lovers invited Mozart to come to Prague and hear the production; the Grove Dictionary suggested that Duschek and her husband František were among them.

Later that year Mozart returned to Prague in order to complete and then produce his next opera, Don Giovanni. At this time, he stayed with the Duscheks in their summer house, a villa called Bertramka, at Smíchov in Prague. Mozart may also have stayed there while completing his opera La clemenza di Tito in September 1791.

=== The composition of "Bella mia fiamma, addio" ===
During the 1787 visit, Mozart wrote the concert aria "Bella mia fiamma, addio," K. 528 (it is dated 3 November 1787). The composition of this aria was somewhat unusual; the following tale is attributed to Mozart's son Karl Thomas:

Petranka [sic] is well-known as the villa in which Mozart enjoyed staying with his musician friends, the Duscheks, during his visit to Prague, and where he composed several numbers for his "Don Juan" [Don Giovanni]. On the summit of a hill near the villa stands a pavilion. In it, one day, Frau Duschek slyly imprisoned the great Mozart, after having provided ink, pen, and notepaper, and told him that he was not to regain his freedom until he had written an aria he had promised her to the words bella mia fiamma addio. Mozart submitted himself to the necessary; but to avenge himself for the trick Frau Duschek had played on him, he used various difficult-to-sing passages in the aria, and threatened his despotic friend that he would immediately destroy the aria if she could not succeed in performing it at sight without mistakes.

Bernard Wilson, commenting on the story, adds: "There seems to be some corroboration of this account in the aria itself. The words Quest' affano, questo passo è terribile per me (mm. 27–34) are set to an awesome tangle of chromatic sequences artfully calculated to test the singer's sense of intonation and powers of interpretation. Apparently Mme. Duschek survived the passo terribile, since the autograph bears her name in Mozart's hand.

In 1789 Duschek sang the work along with other arias at concerts given by Mozart in Dresden and Leipzig, during his German tour of that year.

=== Were Mozart and Duschek lovers? ===
Maynard Solomon has suggested that Mozart and Duschek were lovers. This is dubious; see Mozart's Berlin journey.

== Assessment ==
Duschek's voice was praised for its range and flexibility. Her admirers used to call her "a Bohemian Gabrielli" after the famous Italian coloratura singer Caterina Gabrielli. The Grove Dictionary assesses her singing thus: "She was appreciated for the sonority, range and flexibility of her voice, for her musicianship, and superb execution of both bravura arias and recitatives."
